= List of King's Lynn Town F.C. seasons =

King's Lynn Town Football Club is a football club based in King's Lynn, Norfolk, England. Nicknamed 'The Linnets', they are currently members of the National League North and play at the Walks. They were founded in 2010 as a phoenix club of King's Lynn F.C., which were wound up a year earlier.

== Key ==
Key to league record

- Level = Level of the league in the current league system
- Pld = Games played
- W = Games won
- D = Games drawn
- L = Games lost
- GF = Goals for
- GA = Goals against
- GD = Goals difference
- Pts = Points
- Position = Position in the final league table
- Top scorer and number of goals scored shown in bold when he was also top scorer for the division.

Key to cup records

- Res = Final reached round
- Rec = Final club record in the form of wins-draws-losses
- PR = Preliminary round
- QR1 (2, etc.) = Qualifying Cup rounds
- G = Group stage
- R1 (2, etc.) = Proper Cup rounds
- QF = Quarter-finalists
- SF = Semi-finalists
- F = Finalists
- A(QF,SF,F) = Area quarter-, semi-, finalists
- W = Winners

== Seasons ==
Year	League														Cup competitions					Manager
Year	Division	Lvl	Pld	W	D	L	GF	GA	GD	Pts	Position	Leading league scorer		Average attendance	FA Cup		FA Trophy		Norfolk Senior Cup	Manager
Year	Division	Lvl	Pld	W	D	L	GF	GA	GD	Pts	Position	Name	Goals	Average attendance	Res	Rec	Res	Rec	Norfolk Senior Cup	Manager
Club formed after King's Lynn folded in December 2009.
2010–11	**United Counties League Premier Division**	9	40	33	4	3	135	39	+96	103	2nd of 21				– (Note: Ineligible for competition as a new club.)		FA Vase SF	8-0-2	F	Gary Setchell
2011–12	**United Counties League Premier Division**	9	40	34	4	2	122	32	+90	106	2nd of 21				QR4	5–0–1	FA Vase R2	0-0-1		Gary Setchell
2012–13	**Northern Premier League Division One South**	8	42	28	8	6	86	46	+40	92	1st of 22			667	QR1	1–1–1	R3	5–0–1		Gary Setchell
2013–14	**Northern Premier League**; **Premier Division**	7	46	20	8	18	76	77	-1	68	11th of 24			607	QR1	0–0–1	QR1	0–0–1	SF	Gary Setchell
2014–15	**Northern Premier League**; **Premier Division**	7	46	14	10	22	60	81	-21	52	18th of 24			509	**QR4**	3–0–1	QR3	2–1–1	QF	Gary Setchell
2015–16	**Southern Football League**; **Premier Division**	7	46	21	7	18	58	54	+4	70	9th of 24			488	QR3	2–0–1	QR2	1–1–1	SF	Gary Setchell
2016–17	**Southern Football League**; **Premier Division**	7	46	14	18	14	60	69	-9	60	13th of 24			544	QR3	2–0–1	R1	3–0–1	W	Gary Setchell
2017–18	**Southern Football League**; **Premier Division**	7	46	30	10	6	99	39	+60	100	2nd of 24			780	QR2	1–0–1	QR1	0–0–1	QF	Gary Setchell; Ian Culverhouse
2017–18	**Southern Football League**; **Premier Division**	7	Lost in the play-off final												QR2	1–0–1	QR1	0–0–1	QF	Gary Setchell; Ian Culverhouse
2018–19	**Southern Football League**; **Premier Division Central**	7	42	23	11	8	80	41	+39	80	2nd of 22	Adam Marriott	24	712	QR3	2–1–1	QR1	0–1–1		Simon Clark; Ian Culverhouse
2018–19	**Southern Football League**; **Premier Division Central**	7	Promoted after winning the play-off												QR3	2–1–1	QR1	0–1–1		Simon Clark; Ian Culverhouse
2019–20	**National League**; **North**	6	32	19	7	6	63	39	+24	64	1st of 22	Adam Marriott	28	1,417	QR4	2–1–1	R2	1–2–1		Ian Culverhouse
2019–20	**National League**; **North**	6	The regular season was cut short due to COVID-19, final league positions decided by points-per-game												QR4	2–1–1	R2	1–2–1		Ian Culverhouse
2020–21	**National**; **League**	5	42	7	10	25	50	98	-48	31	21st of 23	Michael Gash; Kairo Mitchell	7	– (Note: Most of the games were played behind the closed doors.)	R2	1–0–1	R4	1–1–0		Ian Culverhouse
2021–22	**National**; **League**	5	44	8	10	26	47	79	-32	34	21st of 23	Gold Omotayo	10	1,177	R1	1–0–1	R4	1–1–0		Ian Culverhouse; Tommy Widdrington
2022–23	**National League**; **North**	6	46	27	12	7	84	43	+41	84	2nd of 24	Gold Omotayo	21	1,216	R2	4–1–1	R2	0–1–0		Tommy Widdrington; Mark Hughes
2022–23	**National League**; **North**	6	Lost in the play-off semi-final.												R2	4–1–1	R2	0–1–0		Tommy Widdrington; Mark Hughes
2023–24	**National League**; **North**	6	46	13	16	17	54	66	-12	55	18th of 24	Jonny Margetts	9	952	QR2	0–1–1	R2	0–0–1		Mark Hughes; Adam Lakeland
2024–25	**National League**; **North**	6	46	23	10	13	52	45	+7	79	6th of 24	Gold Omotayo; Jonny Margetts	10	1,112	QR4	1–2–1	R2	0–0–1		Adam Lakeland
2024–25	**National League**; **North**	6	Lost in the play-off quarterfinal.												QR4	1–2–1	R2	0–0–1		Adam Lakeland
