= 2009–10 Northern Premier League =

The 2009–10 season was the 42nd season for the Northern Premier League Premier Division, and the third season for the Northern Premier League Division One North and South.

For Sponsorship reasons, the leagues were more formally known as the Unibond Premier, Unibond 1st Division North and Unibond 1st Division South

This was the last season that the three Northern Premier League divisions were sponsored by Henkel Unibond, ending a record 17 seasons relationship.

The final allocations of teams following the 2008–09 season was released on 29 May 2009. With the restructuring of the national league system complete, all three divisions of the Northern Premier League had their full complement of twenty-two teams until the withdrawal of Newcastle Blue Star (see below).

== Premier Division ==
Northern Premier League Premier Division
- Season: 2009–10
- Champions: Guiseley
- Promoted: Guiseley; Boston United
- Relegated: Durham City
- Matches: 383
- Goals: 1,280 (3.34 per match)

The Premier Division featured seven new clubs:

- Burscough, relegated from the Conference North
- Hucknall Town, relegated from the Conference North
- King's Lynn, demoted under stadium quality rules from the Conference North
- Durham City, promoted from NPL Division One North
- Newcastle Blue Star, promoted via play-offs from NPL Division One North
- Retford United, promoted from NPL Division One South
- Stocksbridge Park Steels, promoted via play-offs from NPL Division One South

=== League table ===
Pos	Team	Pld	W	D	L	GF	GA	GD	Pts	Promotion or relegation
1	Guiseley (C, P)	38	25	4	9	73	41	+32	79	Promotion to Conference North
2	Bradford Park Avenue	38	24	6	8	94	51	+43	78	Qualification for Playoffs
3	Boston United (P)	38	23	8	7	90	34	+56	77	Qualification for Playoffs
4	North Ferriby United	38	22	9	7	70	38	+32	75	Qualification for Playoffs
5	Kendal Town	38	21	8	9	75	47	+28	71	Qualification for Playoffs
6	Retford United	38	18	11	9	73	46	+27	65	
7	Matlock Town	38	17	9	12	72	49	+23	60	
8	Buxton	38	16	12	10	66	43	+23	60	
9	Marine	38	17	6	15	60	55	+5	57	
10	Nantwich Town	38	16	6	16	64	69	−5	54	
11	Stocksbridge Park Steels	38	15	7	16	80	68	+12	52	
12	Ashton United	38	15	6	17	48	63	−15	51	
13	F.C. United of Manchester	38	13	8	17	62	65	−3	47	
14	Whitby Town	38	12	10	16	56	62	−6	46	
15	Frickley Athletic	38	12	9	17	50	66	−16	45	
16	Burscough	38	13	5	20	55	65	−10	44	
17	Hucknall Town	38	12	8	18	65	81	−16	44	
18	Worksop Town	38	7	9	22	45	68	−23	30	
19	Ossett Town	38	6	7	25	46	92	−46	25 (Note: Ossett Town was reprieved from relegation.)	
20	Durham City (R)	38	2	0	36	27	168	−141	0 (Note: Durham City deducted 6 points for fielding a player under a false name whilst suspended for another club.)	Relegation to NPL Division One North
21	King's Lynn	0	0	0	0	0	0	0	0 (Note: King's Lynn folded on 9 December 2009 and their record (P18 W8 D6 L4 GF49 GA24 Pts30) was expunged on 21 December 2009. And Reform as King's Lynn Town in United Counties League Premier Division.)	Club folded, record expunged. And Reform as King's Lynn Town in UCL Premier Division.
22	Newcastle Blue Star	0	0	0	0	0	0	0	0 (Note: Newcastle Blue Star resigned from the league prior to the season's start.)	Resigned, club folded

Updated to match(es) played on 17 May 2010. Source: Unibond League
Rules for classification: 1) points; 2) goal difference; 3) number of goals scored.
(C) Champions; (P) Promoted; (R) Relegated

=== Results ===
Home \ Away	ASH	BOS	BPA	BUR	BUX	DUR	FCU	FRK	GUI	HUC	KEN	MAR	MAT	NAN	NFU	OST	RET	STO	WTB	WKS
Ashton United		0–2	3–2	1–1	1–2	1–0	2–2	1–3	3–2	1–2	2–3	0–2	0–2	3–2	0–1	2–0	1–0	0–1	2–2	2–1
Boston United	3–0		0–1	3–3	2–1	10–0	4–1	4–2	2–1	2–2	0–0	2–1	1–1	5–0	3–1	7–0	0–1	3–2	0–0	2–0
Bradford Park Avenue	0–1	2–2		1–3	0–0	7–1	3–2	3–1	2–4	2–0	3–2	2–0	5–2	3–2	1–2	4–2	0–1	2–0	1–0	1–0
Burscough	1–2	3–1	0–2		0–1	8–0	1–0	1–0	0–4	2–0	3–0	1–2	0–2	1–0	0–1	5–1	0–4	0–1	2–2	3–0
Buxton	2–0	0–1	1–1	2–2		6–2	3–0	4–1	3–1	2–0	1–2	2–2	1–1	0–0	1–1	2–2	0–2	3–1	0–2	1–0
Durham City	0–1	1–4	0–7	2–3	0–7		1–2	2–3	2–3	0–2	0–7	1–5	0–4	0–2	0–2	1–2	1–4	1–5	4–3	0–5
F.C. United of Manchester	2–3	1–2	1–5	2–0	0–1	1–2		0–0	1–2	2–0	1–4	3–0	1–0	4–0	3–3	2–1	2–4	4–3	1–1	2–0
Frickley Athletic	1–2	0–1	2–2	1–0	1–0	3–1	0–2		1–2	4–2	0–0	0–1	1–0	2–0	2–1	1–1	1–2	1–0	1–1	1–1
Guiseley	2–0	1–3	2–1	2–1	3–1	2–0	2–0	0–0		3–0	1–0	0–2	2–0	1–0	2–3	1–1	1–1	3–1	3–1	1–2
Hucknall Town	1–2	1–4	0–5	5–2	3–1	7–1	2–3	2–2	0–1		4–2	0–0	2–2	1–1	1–4	3–0	1–4	4–3	2–0	3–1
Kendal Town	0–0	1–0	1–1	3–2	0–2	5–0	1–0	3–1	2–1	3–1		4–1	1–1	1–2	2–0	2–2	2–1	1–1	2–0	4–1
Marine	3–4	0–0	1–3	2–1	1–1	7–2	1–1	2–0	0–1	2–1	4–3		2–1	0–2	1–3	2–0	1–2	2–1	2–0	1–1
Matlock Town	5–0	1–0	1–3	1–0	1–1	6–0	4–3	2–2	2–1	5–1	3–0	3–0		1–3	0–1	0–1	0–1	2–2	3–1	4–3
Nantwich Town	2–0	0–4	0–1	1–1	0–3	6–1	1–6	3–1	0–2	4–1	2–3	3–2	2–1		4–2	2–0	2–3	2–2	3–2	3–2
North Ferriby United	4–0	0–0	4–2	1–0	1–1	7–0	1–0	5–1	1–1	2–2	0–2	0–1	2–0	5–3		3–1	0–0	1–0	0–2	1–0
Ossett Town	0–3	0–5	4–6	1–2	3–1	3–0	1–2	4–1	1–4	2–2	3–2	1–4	0–1	0–1	0–1		1–2	2–4	1–3	0–2
Retford United	3–2	1–2	1–1	6–1	1–2	6–1	1–1	3–5	0–2	1–2	1–1	0–1	1–1	0–0	1–1	2–2		1–1	5–0	2–1
Stocksbridge Park Steels	2–1	2–1	2–3	4–1	3–1	6–0	1–1	4–1	2–4	2–3	0–2	4–2	3–4	5–3	1–1	3–1	1–2		2–0	2–2
Whitby Town	1–1	2–0	2–3	4–0	1–5	2–0	2–2	3–1	1–2	3–1	2–3	1–0	2–2	0–3	0–2	1–1	2–0	2–1		1–1
Worksop Town	1–1	1–5	1–3	0–1	1–1	4–0	3–1	1–2	1–3	1–1	0–1	1–0	0–3	0–0	0–2	3–1	3–3	1–2	0–4	

Updated to match(es) played on 24 April 2010. Source: Northern Premier Division results grid
Legend: Blue = home team win; Yellow = draw; Red = away team win.

==== Play-offs ====
Semifinals
2	Bradford Park Avenue	2
5	Kendal Town	1
3	Boston United	2
4	North Ferriby United	1

Final
2	Bradford Park Avenue	1
3	Boston United	2*

* After extra time

=== Stadia and locations ===
Locations of the 2009–10 Northern Premier League teams

Team	Stadium	Capacity
F.C. United of Manchester	Gigg Lane (Bury ground share)	11,840
Newcastle Blue Star	Kingston Park	10,200
Boston United	York Street	6,643
King's Lynn	The Walks	5,733
Buxton	The Silverlands	5,200
Bradford Park Avenue	Horsfall Stadium	5,000
Hucknall Town	Watnall Road	5,000
Ashton United	Hurst Cross	4,500
Nantwich Town	The Weaver Stadium	3,500
Stocksbridge Park Steels	Look Local Stadium	3,500
Whitby Town	Turnbull Ground	3,500
Worksop Town	New Manor Ground (Ilkeston ground share)	3,500
Burscough	Victoria Park	3,054
Durham City	The Arnott Stadium	3,000
Guiseley	Nethermoor Park	3,000
Marine	The Arriva Stadium	2,800
North Ferriby United	Grange Lane	2,700
Kendal Town	Lakeland Radio Stadium	2,400
Matlock Town	Causeway Lane	2,214
Frickley Athletic	Westfield Lane	2,087
Ossett Town	Ingfield	2,000
Retford United	Cannon Park	2,000

== Division One North ==
Northern Premier League Division One North
- Season: 2009–10
- Champions: FC Halifax Town
- Promoted: FC Halifax Town; Colwyn Bay
- Relegated: Rossendale United
- Matches: 463
- Goals: 1,503 (3.25 per match)

The Division One North featured three new clubs:

- AFC Fylde, promoted as champions from the NWCFL Premier Division
- Leigh Genesis, relegated from the NPL Premier Division
- Prescot Cables, relegated from the NPL Premier Division

=== League table ===
Pos	Team	Pld	W	D	L	GF	GA	GD	Pts	Promotion or relegation
1	FC Halifax Town (C, P)	42	30	10	2	108	38	+70	100	Promotion to NPL Premier Division
2	Lancaster City	42	31	3	8	95	45	+50	96	Qualification for Playoffs
3	Curzon Ashton	42	23	12	7	93	50	+43	75 (Note: Curzon Ashton deducted six points; three for fielding an ineligible player and three for a financial irregularity. Initially Curzon Ashton were docked ten points for the financial irregularity, with five points suspended, but on appeal this was reduced to six points with three suspended.)	Qualification for Playoffs
4	Colwyn Bay (P)	42	23	6	13	77	57	+20	75	Qualification for Playoffs
5	Skelmersdale United	42	22	8	12	80	56	+24	74	Qualification for Playoffs
6	Leigh Genesis	42	21	8	13	81	51	+30	71	
7	Mossley	42	18	11	13	73	67	+6	65	
8	Clitheroe	42	18	8	16	72	66	+6	62	
9	Warrington Town	42	18	6	18	65	69	−4	60	
10	Radcliffe Borough	42	17	6	19	65	78	−13	57	
11	Salford City	42	16	8	18	63	74	−11	56	
12	Trafford	42	15	8	19	79	73	+6	53	
13	AFC Fylde	42	15	8	19	67	79	−12	53	
14	Bamber Bridge	42	14	10	18	58	67	−9	52	
15	Prescot Cables	42	13	11	18	51	68	−17	50	
16	Chorley	42	13	10	19	56	76	−20	49	
17	Harrogate Railway Athletic	42	15	7	20	58	79	−21	49 (Note: Harrogate Railway Athletic deducted three points for fielding an ineligible player.)	
18	Wakefield	42	12	12	18	49	58	−9	48	
19	Woodley Sports	42	10	15	17	53	67	−14	45	
20	Garforth Town	42	11	7	24	64	94	−30	40	
21	Ossett Albion	42	7	7	28	52	91	−39	28 (Note: Ossett Albion was reprieved from relegation.)	
22	Rossendale United (R)	42	6	7	29	38	94	−56	25	Relegation to NWCFL Premier Division

Updated to match(es) played on 17 May 2010. Source: Unibond League
Rules for classification: 1) points; 2) goal difference; 3) number of goals scored.
(C) Champions; (P) Promoted; (R) Relegated

=== Results ===
Home \ Away	FYL	BAM	CHO	CLT	COL	CZA	GAR	HAL	HRA	LNC	LEG	MOS	OSA	PRC	RAD	ROS	SLC	SKU	TRA	WAK	WAR	WDL
AFC Fylde		1–1	2–1	0–3	5–2	0–0	3–1	2–2	2–2	1–2	2–1	0–0	2–0	0–3	1–1	1–0	0–1	0–4	0–3	2–3	1–2	2–1
Bamber Bridge	2–4		2–1	1–0	1–2	1–1	3–1	0–2	4–0	2–1	3–1	1–2	1–1	0–0	0–1	0–0	4–3	1–4	3–2	0–1	1–0	2–2
Chorley	3–2	1–1		2–2	1–2	2–5	3–1	3–3	1–1	1–2	1–5	3–2	3–2	1–1	1–0	0–0	3–2	0–4	4–2	0–0	1–2	0–0
Clitheroe	7–1	3–0	2–3		2–1	4–4	2–1	1–2	4–2	1–3	1–2	0–0	2–1	1–2	2–1	2–1	2–0	1–1	1–4	2–1	2–1	1–0
Colwyn Bay	1–2	1–0	3–1	0–0		0–1	3–1	0–3	2–0	0–2	1–0	3–1	4–2	3–1	1–4	4–0	3–2	1–2	2–2	1–1	2–3	1–0
Curzon Ashton	3–1	0–0	5–0	4–1	1–1		6–2	0–5	2–0	0–0	2–1	2–3	1–1	2–1	5–1	1–0	5–1	1–1	5–1	4–0	1–2	2–2
Garforth Town	3–2	3–3	1–1	2–2	2–4	1–3		3–4	1–4	2–3	0–5	0–1	4–3	0–5	4–2	2–1	0–1	1–3	1–1	0–3	5–3	1–1
FC Halifax Town	3–0	4–1	1–0	2–2	3–0	1–0	1–0		3–0	4–0	3–1	4–2	5–0	3–0	2–1	2–0	6–1	1–1	2–0	1–1	4–1	2–1
Harrogate Railway Athletic	2–1	3–1	0–2	2–3	1–3	2–0	2–1	1–2		3–1	2–1	0–3	1–0	0–3	2–2	2–0	0–1	0–1	3–2	0–1	2–1	3–1
Lancaster City	2–0	3–1	3–0	2–1	1–1	1–1	0–3	0–1	3–0		2–0	2–1	4–2	5–0	4–0	4–0	4–1	4–2	2–1	3–1	4–1	7–1
Leigh Genesis	4–1	0–3	0–2	2–0	3–1	0–0	2–1	1–1	5–1	0–2		1–1	1–0	6–0	1–2	4–3	2–1	0–1	2–0	2–0	3–2	2–0
Mossley	4–2	1–0	2–2	4–2	1–4	1–4	5–2	3–3	3–2	0–2	1–1		2–1	1–1	1–0	4–1	0–1	1–1	2–0	1–1	5–0	2–0
Ossett Albion	0–2	0–1	2–1	1–5	0–2	2–4	2–1	2–4	0–1	1–4	2–4	2–0		2–2	4–2	1–1	2–4	1–3	1–3	0–1	1–1	0–0
Prescot Cables	1–2	0–2	1–0	2–0	0–1	0–1	3–2	1–0	2–2	0–2	0–4	0–0	2–1		3–3	2–2	1–3	2–1	1–1	3–1	1–2	1–1
Radcliffe Borough	1–1	4–2	1–0	0–2	0–7	1–3	0–2	3–2	2–4	0–1	2–1	0–1	1–0	1–2		3–2	1–3	2–1	4–2	3–1	0–2	2–1
Rossendale United	2–1	2–2	1–2	2–0	1–4	3–1	0–2	0–3	0–2	2–4	1–3	1–2	0–2	1–0	1–3		1–1	0–2	1–8	1–0	1–3	1–2
Salford City	3–1	1–2	3–0	1–1	2–1	0–3	0–0	0–3	1–1	1–2	3–3	4–1	1–2	0–2	1–2	0–2		2–0	2–1	1–1	1–1	3–1
Skelmersdale United	1–4	3–1	2–0	3–1	0–1	2–2	1–3	2–2	4–3	1–2	0–2	5–2	1–1	2–0	0–4	2–1	3–1		4–0	1–2	2–1	2–2
Trafford	2–2	3–2	3–1	0–2	1–2	2–3	0–2	0–3	0–0	2–0	0–2	3–3	5–2	3–0	1–1	5–0	5–1	0–1		1–1	1–2	2–0
Wakefield	1–3	0–1	1–4	2–0	1–1	0–3	1–1	1–1	6–0	2–0	2–2	2–3	2–1	1–1	0–0	2–0	0–1	1–2	1–2		1–2	1–0
Warrington Town	1–4	1–1	2–0	0–1	0–1	3–1	2–0	1–3	3–1	0–1	0–0	2–0	2–1	3–0	1–2	5–1	1–3	1–4	0–2	1–0		1–1
Woodley Sports	0–4	3–1	0–1	3–1	3–0	0–0	0–1	2–2	1–1	2–1	1–1	2–1	1–3	2–1	3–2	1–1	1–1	1–0	2–3	3–1	3–3	

Updated to match(es) played on 24 April 2010. Source: Northern Premier League First Division North results grid
Legend: Blue = home team win; Yellow = draw; Red = away team win.

=== Play-offs ===
Semifinals
2	Lancaster City	2
5	Skelmersdale United	0
3	Curzon Ashton	1
4	Colwyn Bay	2

Final
2	Lancaster City	0
4	Colwyn Bay	1

== Division One South ==
Northern Premier League Division One South
- Season: 2009–10
- Champions: Mickleover Sports
- Promoted: Mickleover Sports; Chasetown
- Relegated: Willenhall Town
- Matches: 463
- Goals: 1,459 (3.15 per match)

The Division One South featured five new clubs:

- Witton Albion, relegated from the NPL Premier Division
- Cammell Laird, demoted under stadium quality rules from the NPL Premier Division
- Chasetown, transferred from the Southern League Division One Midlands
- Mickleover Sports, promoted as champions from the Northern Counties East League Premier Division
- Market Drayton, promoted as champions from the Midland Football Alliance

=== League table ===
Pos	Team	Pld	W	D	L	GF	GA	GD	Pts	Promotion or relegation
1	Mickleover Sports (C, P)	42	28	5	9	93	51	+42	89	Promotion to NPL Premier Division
2	Chasetown (P)	42	24	10	8	78	42	+36	82	Qualification for Playoffs
3	Glapwell	42	23	12	7	73	42	+31	81	Qualification for Playoffs
4	Kidsgrove Athletic	42	22	12	8	93	50	+43	78	Qualification for Playoffs
5	Sheffield	42	21	10	11	75	51	+24	73	Qualification for Playoffs
6	Belper Town	42	21	8	13	83	55	+28	71	
7	Witton Albion	42	20	7	15	76	53	+23	67	Transferred to the NPL Division One North
8	Leek Town	42	18	13	11	68	61	+7	67	
9	Carlton Town	42	19	9	14	74	68	+6	66	
10	Stamford	42	18	10	14	77	54	+23	64	
11	Grantham Town	42	17	11	14	62	56	+6	62	
12	Rushall Olympic	42	16	11	15	68	61	+7	59	
13	Market Drayton Town	42	16	5	21	71	81	−10	53	
14	Loughborough Dynamo	42	15	8	19	70	80	−10	53	
15	Brigg Town	42	15	7	20	60	77	−17	52	
16	Cammell Laird	42	13	11	18	51	66	−15	50	Transferred to the NPL Division One North
17	Shepshed Dynamo	42	10	18	14	44	55	−11	48	
18	Goole	42	12	10	20	70	84	−14	46	
19	Lincoln United	42	13	5	24	57	67	−10	44	
20	Quorn	42	9	13	20	55	78	−23	40	
21	Spalding United	42	5	5	32	33	111	−78	20 (Note: Spalding United was reprieved from relegation.)	
22	Willenhall Town (R)	42	5	4	33	21	109	−88	9 (Note: Willenhall Town deducted 10 points for entering administration)	Relegation to Midland Alliance

Updated to match(es) played on 17 May 2010. Source: Unibond League
Rules for classification: 1) points; 2) goal difference; 3) number of goals scored.
(C) Champions; (P) Promoted; (R) Relegated

=== Results ===
Home \ Away	BLP	BRG	CAM	CAR	CHA	GLP	GOO	GRN	KID	LEE	LIN	LOU	MAR	MIC	QON	RSO	SHE	SPD	SPA	STM	WIL	WTN
Belper Town		2–0	3–0	2–0	0–2	1–1	2–2	1–1	3–2	1–1	0–1	7–1	4–1	1–0	2–1	1–3	2–2	1–1	4–0	3–3	3–0	3–2
Brigg Town	3–0		1–0	2–4	0–1	2–4	1–3	1–1	1–3	2–3	2–1	4–2	1–5	0–1	2–2	2–2	0–2	1–1	1–1	3–2	5–0	1–0
Cammell Laird	1–3	3–1		1–1	0–2	0–0	2–2	1–1	0–2	2–0	2–1	3–3	3–0	1–2	1–0	3–2	2–0	1–1	0–1	0–2	1–0	1–1
Carlton Town	2–4	1–2	3–0		0–2	0–1	2–0	0–3	1–1	5–2	4–3	3–3	5–3	2–3	1–0	1–0	2–0	2–1	3–1	1–1	0–2	4–1
Chasetown	0–1	3–0	2–1	1–1		2–1	4–3	1–1	1–1	1–0	2–2	1–1	0–2	2–1	6–2	1–2	3–1	1–1	4–0	0–0	2–0	1–0
Glapwell	2–1	3–2	4–1	3–2	1–0		3–0	0–2	1–1	2–1	2–0	3–1	1–3	0–0	0–0	2–0	1–1	1–0	2–0	1–0	1–0	1–1
Goole	1–2	2–3	0–1	1–1	0–5	2–2		1–2	3–4	0–2	2–1	4–1	3–0	1–4	2–0	4–0	2–2	4–1	4–0	1–1	4–1	0–1
Grantham Town	4–2	3–4	4–0	0–1	1–3	1–1	1–3		0–4	0–1	1–0	0–2	2–0	3–1	1–1	2–2	0–2	1–0	2–0	1–2	4–1	0–1
Kidsgrove Athletic	2–1	3–1	4–2	0–2	1–3	0–1	2–1	2–2		5–2	3–0	1–0	3–3	2–2	2–1	2–1	1–1	2–0	5–0	2–0	7–0	0–1
Leek Town	2–1	5–1	4–2	3–1	1–3	2–2	1–1	0–1	2–1		2–2	3–3	1–1	3–2	2–2	1–1	2–2	1–1	1–0	1–0	5–1	1–1
Lincoln United	1–2	2–0	0–2	2–0	0–1	1–4	1–2	0–2	3–3	0–1		1–2	2–0	0–2	4–0	2–1	0–1	3–1	4–0	1–2	3–1	0–1
Loughborough Dynamo	2–1	1–1	2–0	0–3	2–2	1–4	3–1	1–2	1–4	0–2	1–0		0–1	3–1	3–3	1–0	3–2	2–3	5–3	2–1	5–0	2–4
Market Drayton Town	2–1	3–0	0–3	1–2	1–0	2–1	1–2	1–5	1–3	0–2	1–2	0–2		1–3	4–2	1–2	1–5	2–1	6–0	3–1	7–1	2–1
Mickleover Sports	2–1	2–1	1–1	4–0	3–0	3–0	3–2	4–1	1–0	2–0	2–0	3–2	1–0		2–1	3–2	4–2	2–1	4–0	1–1	3–3	2–1
Quorn	1–3	1–2	2–2	3–3	1–1	3–1	3–1	2–1	1–1	2–0	4–2	2–1	1–1	0–3		1–2	1–0	1–1	2–2	0–1	0–2	1–4
Rushall Olympic	0–3	0–0	2–2	4–1	4–2	2–1	5–0	2–2	1–1	2–2	1–4	2–1	4–0	3–1	1–0		1–1	0–1	3–0	1–2	3–2	0–1
Sheffield	2–6	0–1	3–1	5–1	2–0	0–0	3–0	1–1	0–3	1–2	2–0	1–0	3–1	4–2	2–0	1–1		4–1	3–1	0–0	1–0	1–0
Shepshed Dynamo	1–1	1–0	2–0	0–0	0–0	1–1	3–3	2–0	1–1	1–1	1–1	1–0	0–0	0–4	1–2	2–0	0–4		4–0	1–1	0–0	2–1
Spalding United	1–0	0–2	0–1	2–2	1–7	0–2	1–1	0–1	0–2	3–0	1–2	0–2	3–4	0–5	3–0	1–1	1–3	2–3		1–3	2–0	1–6
Stamford	2–1	1–2	3–0	1–3	2–0	1–2	2–2	4–0	3–3	2–0	4–1	2–1	1–1	3–1	3–1	1–2	0–1	2–1	3–1		9–0	4–1
Willenhall Town	0–2	0–2	0–3	0–1	0–1	1–7	1–0	0–1	0–3	1–2	0–0	0–1	0–3	1–2	0–3	0–2	0–3	0–0	1–0	1–0		0–3
Witton Albion	0–1	3–0	1–1	0–3	1–2	1–3	6–0	1–1	2–1	0–1	2–4	1–1	4–2	2–1	2–2	2–1	3–0	2–0	3–0	3–1	5–1	

Updated to match(es) played on 24 April 2010. Source: Northern Premier League First Division South results grid
Legend: Blue = home team win; Yellow = draw; Red = away team win.

=== Play-offs ===
Semifinals
2	Chasetown	3
5	Sheffield	2
3	Glapwell	1
4	Kidsgrove Athletic	0

Final
2	Chasetown	1
3	Glapwell	0

== Resignations and their effects ==
On 20 June 2009, three days following the league's AGM which confirmed the 2009–10 allocation, Newcastle Blue Star resigned from the league. As division placements had been confirmed be then, no replacement team could be entered and the Premier Division was reduced to twenty-one teams for the season.

On 9 December 2009, King's Lynn were officially wound up by the High Court in London over debts and an overdue tax bill, and they will play no further games in the season. The League released a table on 21 December with King's Lynn's playing record expunged from it, and leaving the Premier Division with twenty clubs and only two relegation spots. Then, in March 2010 Chester City F.C. and Farsley Celtic A.F.C. were removed from the Conference National and Conference North respectively.

Promotion from the First Divisions to the Premier Division took place as planned. Relegation from the First Divisions to the county level was reduced from the planned two per division to one. Relegation from the Premier Division was reduced from two to one on account of developments in the Conference. The final decision on relegations were made during the close season by the FA's National League System Committee which left this method completely redundant as Chester City, Farsley Celtic (now Farsley A.F.C.), King's Lynn, Grays Athletic (lost their ground), Merthyr Tydfil (expelled), VCD Athletic (ground grade fail) and Rothwell Town (resigned) were all demoted to Level 8.

== Cup results ==
Challenge Cup: Teams from all 3 divisions.

- Boston United 2–0 Retford United

President's Cup: Teams from lower 2 divisions.

- Belper Town 3–1 Stamford

Chairman's Cup: Between Champions of NPL Division One North and NPL Division One South.

- Halifax 2–2 Mickleover, Mickleover win 3–1 on Pens

== Peter Swales Shield ==
2010 Peter Swales Shield
Guiseley	Mickleover Sports
1	1
- Guiseley won 5–3 on penalties
- Date: 1 May 2010
- Venue: Nethermoor Park, Guiseley
- Referee: C Grundy
- Attendance: 259

The Peter Swales Shield has changed format several times, and the 2010 version saw the champions of the 2009–10 NPL Premier Division, Guiseley, play against the winners of the 2010 NPL Chairman's Cup, North Ferriby United. It was decided before the match that no extra time would be played and would go straight to penalties after regulation. Guiseley won the game 5–3 on penalties after a 1–1 draw after 90 minutes.

1 May 2010	Guiseley (2009–10 NPL Premier Division Winners)	1–1 (5–3 p)	Mickleover Sports (2010 Chairman's Cup Winners)	Nethermoor Park, Guiseley
15:00	Johnson 52'	Guiseley Report; Mickleover Sports Report	Martin 31'	Attendance: 259; Referee: C Grundy
	Penalties
	Fitzgerald (penalty scored); Rudd (penalty scored); Johnson (penalty scored); Burton (penalty scored); Ainge (penalty scored)		(penalty missed) Martin (penalty scored) (penalty scored) (penalty scored)
