= United League (football) =

English association football league

The United League was an association football league in England that existed from 1896 to 1902, and then again from 1905 to 1909.

The league was formed in 1896 to provide clubs in southern and central England with additional midweek matches. Over the years, clubs frequently joined and left the league. By 1899, significant departures left the league struggling, leading to its dissolution in 1902. It was revived in 1905 but ultimately ceased operations again in 1909.

== Champions ==
- 1896–97 - Millwall Athletic
- 1897–98 - Luton Town
- 1898–99 - Millwall Athletic
- 1899–1900 - Wellingborough
- 1900–01 - Rothwell Town Swifts
- 1901–02 - Irthlingborough Town
- Not contested between 1902 and 1905
- 1905–06 - Watford
- 1906–07 - Crystal Palace
- 1907–08 - Brentford
- 1908–09 - New Brompton

== Tables ==
=== 1896–97 ===
Pos	Team	Pld	W	D	L	GF	GA	GD	Pts
1	Millwall Athletic	14	11	1	2	43	22	+21	23
2	Luton Town	14	10	1	3	52	16	+36	21
3	Woolwich Arsenal	14	6	3	5	28	34	−6	15
4	Loughborough	14	6	1	7	29	31	−2	13
5	Rushden Town	14	6	1	7	25	42	−17	13
6	Kettering	14	4	4	6	23	24	−1	12
7	Wellingborough	14	3	3	8	17	39	−22	9
8	Tottenham Hotspur	14	1	4	9	25	34	−9	6

=== 1897–98 ===
Pos	Club	P	W	D	L	F	A	Pts
1	Luton Town	16	13	2	1	49	11	28
2	Tottenham Hotspur	16	8	5	3	40	27	21
3	Woolwich Arsenal	16	8	5	3	35	24	21
4	Kettering	16	9	1	6	28	24	19
5	Rushden Town	16	7	1	8	24	26	15
6	Southampton	16	6	3	7	23	28	13 (Note: Southampton were deducted two points.)
7	Millwall Athletic	16	4	4	8	27	27	12
8	Wellingborough	16	3	3	10	17	42	9
9	Loughborough	16	1	2	13	8	42	4

=== 1898–99 ===
Pos	Club	P	W	D	L	F	A	Pts
1	Millwall Athletic	20	14	3	3	42	19	31
2	Southampton	20	12	1	7	53	32	25
3	Woolwich Arsenal	20	10	4	6	40	30	24
4	Tottenham Hotspur	20	11	2	7	36	25	24
5	Bristol City	20	11	0	9	43	31	22
6	Reading	20	8	5	7	36	25	21
7	Brighton United	20	10	1	9	41	42	21
8	Wellingborough	20	7	1	12	32	40	15
9	Kettering	20	8	1	11	25	38	15 (Note: Kettering Town were deducted two points.)
10	Rushden Town	20	6	1	13	26	45	13
11	Luton Town	20	2	3	15	24	71	7

=== 1899–1900 ===
Pos	Club	P	W	D	L	F	A	Pts
1	Wellingborough	12	8	2	2	35	12	18
2	Northampton Town	12	7	3	2	43	16	17
3	Rushden Town	12	8	1	3	33	20	17
4	Kettering	12	8	0	4	30	11	16
5	Rothwell Town Swifts	12	4	0	8	25	34	8
6	Finedon Revellers	12	3	1	8	13	41	7
7	Desborough Unity	12	3	1	8	13	41	7

=== 1900–01 ===
Pos	Club	P	W	D	L	F	A	Pts
1	Rothwell Town Swifts	12	10	0	2	36	11	20
2	Luton Town	12	7	4	1	30	18	18
3	Kettering	12	6	3	3	23	18	15
4	Wellingborough	12	6	0	6	24	28	12
5	Northampton Town	12	2	4	6	16	27	8
6	Rushden Town	12	2	3	7	16	24	7
7	Finedon Revellers	12	0	4	8	10	29	4

=== 1901–02 ===
Table incomplete.

Pos	Club	P	W	D	L	F	A	Pts
1	Irthlingborough Town	8	4	3	1	9	5	11
2	Rothwell Town Swifts	9	4	2	3	13	13	10
3	Kettering	9	3	3	3	11	7	9
4	Rushden Town	8	2	3	3	13	14	7
5	Wellingborough	8	1	4	3	11	15	6
6	Finedon Revellers	4	1	1	2	4	7	3

=== 1905–06 ===
Pos	Club	P	W	D	L	F	A	Pts
1	Watford	18	13	4	1	49	15	30
2	Crystal Palace	18	13	1	4	51	21	27
3	Leyton	18	8	4	6	33	21	20
4	Luton Town	18	7	4	7	47	27	18
5	Clapton Orient Reserves	18	5	8	5	24	27	18
6	Swindon Town	18	7	3	8	33	29	17
7	Brighton & Hove Albion	18	6	4	8	28	28	16
8	New Brompton	18	7	2	9	26	27	16
9	Grays United	18	4	2	12	21	64	10
10	Southern United	18	3	2	13	21	64	8

=== 1906–07 ===
Pos	Club	P	W	D	L	F	A	Pts
1	Crystal Palace	14	8	5	1	39	20	21
2	Brighton & Hove Albion	14	6	6	2	33	26	18
3	Luton Town	14	8	1	5	23	27	17
4	Norwich City	14	6	4	4	34	22	16
5	Hastings & St Leonards	14	6	2	6	27	24	14
6	Leyton	14	3	4	7	24	27	10
7	New Brompton	14	3	3	8	24	35	9
8	Watford	14	3	1	10	15	38	7

=== 1907–08 ===
Pos	Club	P	W	D	L	F	A	Pts
1	Brentford	8	6	1	1	19	8	13
2	Southend United	8	3	2	3	16	16	8
3	New Brompton	8	2	3	3	10	11	7
4	Croydon Common	8	3	1	4	9	18	7
5	Hastings & St Leonards United	8	1	3	4	13	14	5

=== 1908–09 ===
==== Northern Section ====
Pos	Club	P	W	D	L	F	A	Pts
1	Rotherham Town	12	8	1	3	39	15	17
2	Lincoln City	12	7	2	3	32	18	16
3	Norwich City	12	7	2	3	33	20	16
4	Walsall	12	5	2	5	23	25	12
5	Coventry City	12	5	1	6	27	31	11
6	Peterborough City	12	4	1	7	18	34	9
7	Grantham Avenue	12	1	1	10	12	41	3

==== Southern Section ====
Pos	Club	P	W	D	L	F	A	Pts
1	New Brompton	8	5	1	2	27	14	11
2	Hastings & St Leonards United	8	4	1	3	13	12	9
3	Croydon Common	8	4	0	4	13	17	8
4	Southend United	8	2	3	3	15	18	7
5	Brentford	8	2	1	5	13	20	5

==== Final ====
Rotherham Town	1–4	New Brompton
