= Harborough Town F.C. =

Association football club in England

Coordinates: 52.4654°N 0.9180°W

Harborough Town
- Full name: Harborough Town Football Club
- Nickname: The Bees
- Founded: 1975
- Ground: Bowden Park, Market Harborough
- Chairman: Pete Dougan
- Manager: Mitch Austin
- League: National League North
- 2025–26: Southern League Premier Division Central, 1st of 22 (promoted)
- Website: harboroughtownfc.org
Home colours	Away colours

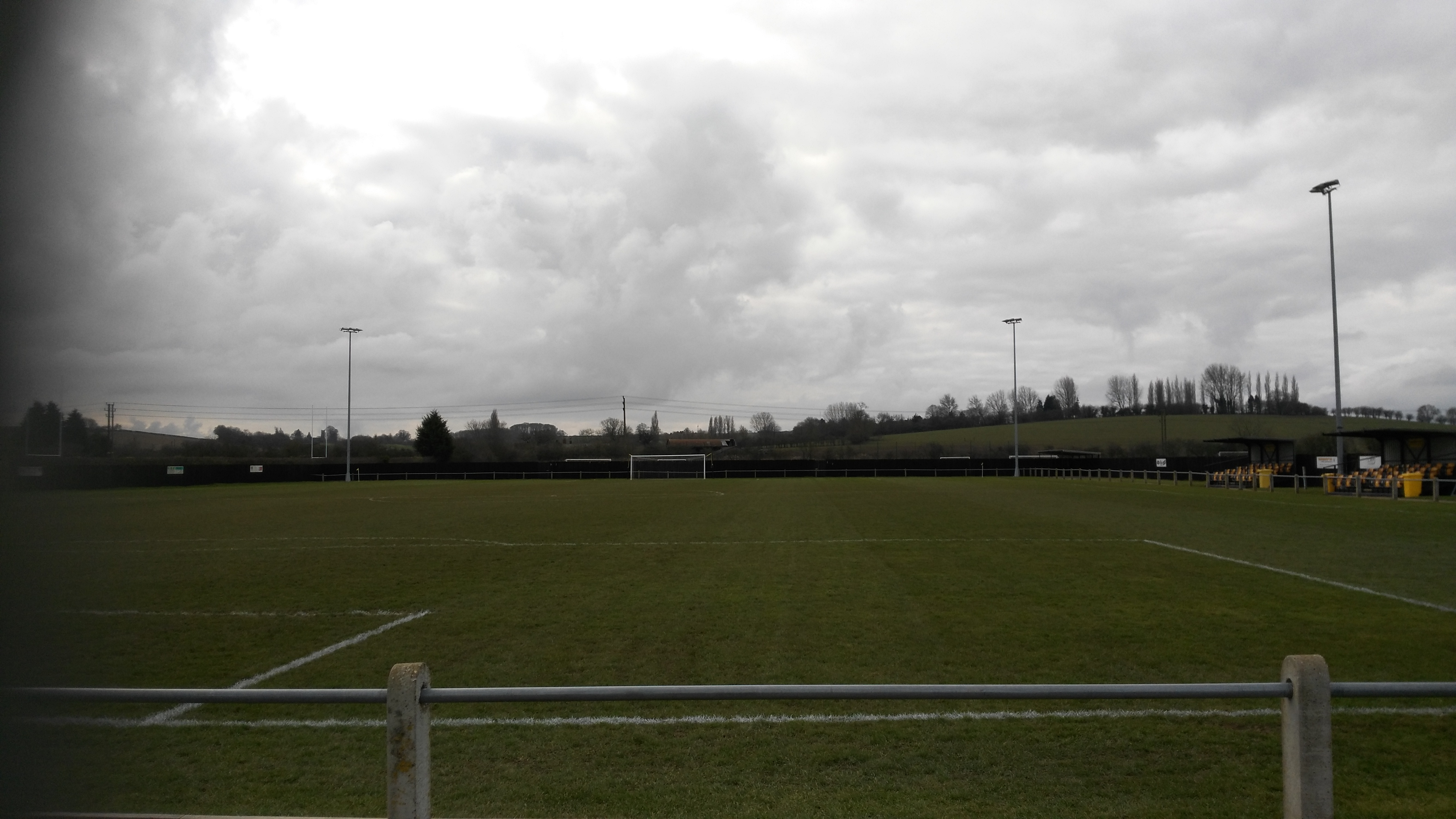
Bowden Park

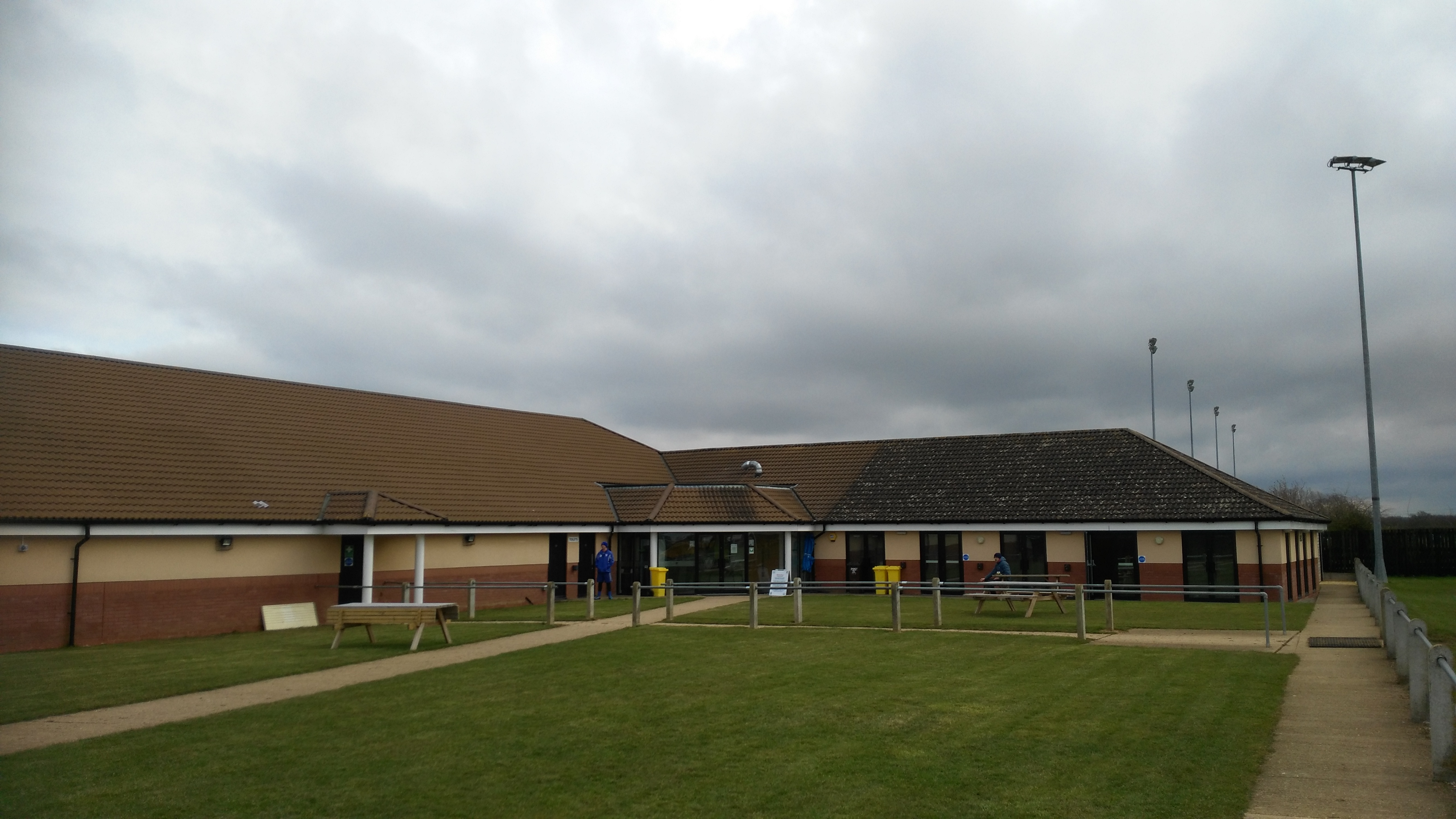
Clubhouse end and clubhouse

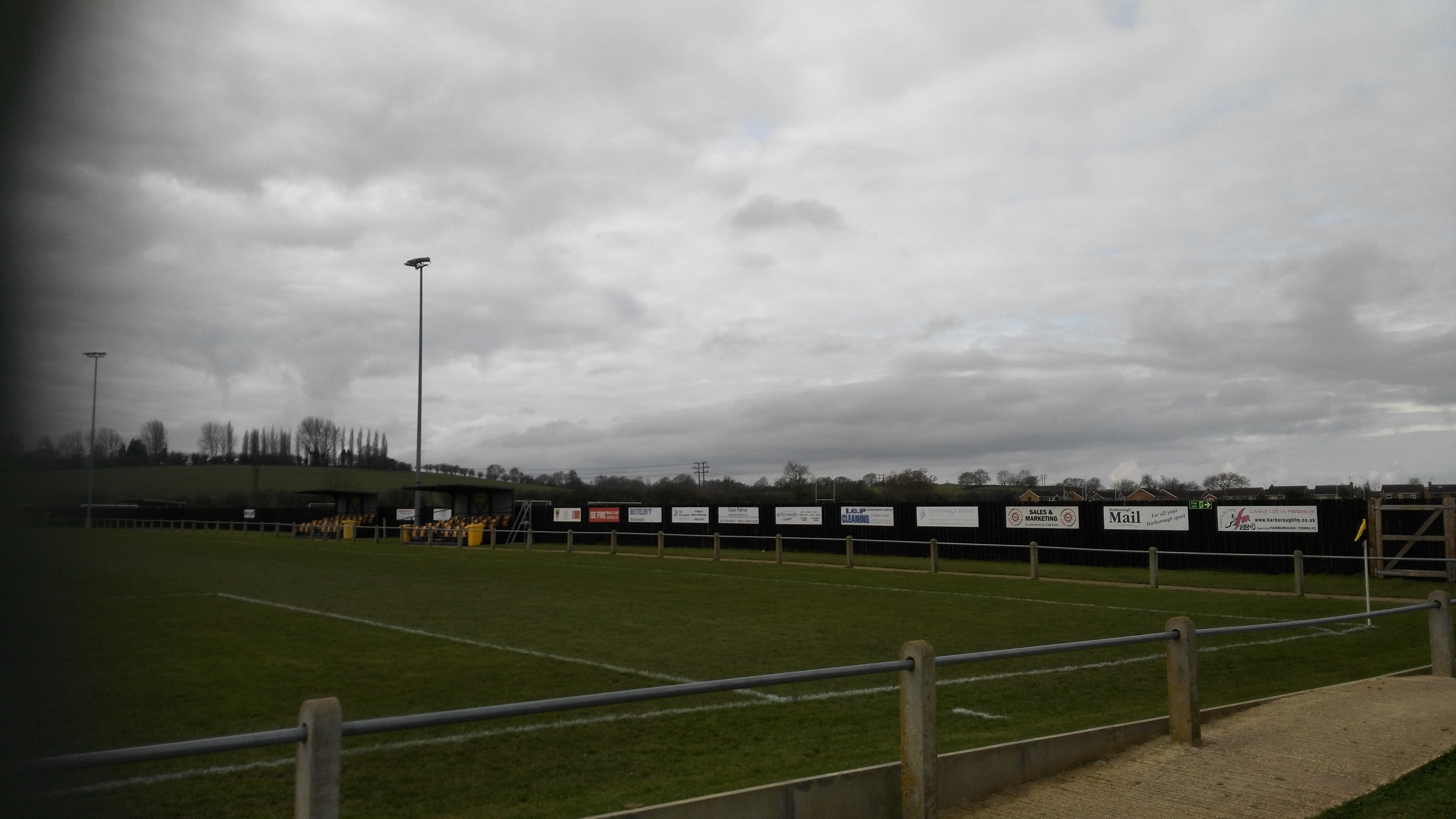
Main stand side

Harborough Town Football Club is a football club based in Market Harborough, Leicestershire, England. They are currently members of the National League North and play at Bowden Park.

== History ==
The club was established in 1975 as a youth team under the name Harborough Town Juniors, with the modern club formed by a merger with adult team Spencer United in 2008. Spencer United joined Division Five of the Leicester & District Mutual League in 1976. They were Division Five champions in 1977–78 and were promoted to Division Two. A third-place finish the following season saw them promoted to Division One. Although the club were relegated back to Division Two three seasons later, they were Division Two runners-up in 1987–88 and promoted to the Premier Division. In 1996 they joined Division One of the Northamptonshire Combination.

Spencer United were Northamptonshire Combination Division One champions in 1997–98, earning promotion to the Premier Division. In 2002 the club were renamed Harborough Spencer United. They were relegated back to Division One after finishing bottom of the Premier Division in 2004–05, and were subsequently renamed Harborough Town Spencers in 2006. During the 2007–08 season, the club were amalgamated into Harborough Town, adopting their name. They ended the season as Division One runners-up, earning promotion to the Premier Division.

In 2009–10 Harborough were Premier Division champions, earning promotion to Division One of the United Counties League. Although they finished bottom of Division One in their first season in the league, the club were Division One runners-up in 2011–12 and were promoted to the Premier Division. In 2021–22 they were Premier Division South champions, earning promotion to Division One Midlands of the Northern Premier League. The 2023–24 season saw the club finish third in Division One Midlands, qualifying for the promotion play-offs. After beating Hinckley Leicester Road on penalties in the semi-finals, they defeated Anstey Nomads 2–0 in the final to earn promotion to the Premier Division Central of the Southern League.

In 2024–25 Harborough qualified for the first round of the FA Cup for the first time. After defeating Tonbridge Angels 4–1 in the first round, they were beaten 5–3 by Reading after extra time in the second round. They went on to finish fifth in the Premier Division Central, before losing to Kettering Town on penalties in the play-off semi-finals. The following season saw them win the Premier Division Central title, earning promotion to the National League North.

== Ground ==
The club play at Bowden Park. In 2024 the club was granted planning permission to expand the ground, including a new 154-seater stand.

== Current squad ==
As of 3 August 2026

Note: Flags indicate national team as defined under FIFA eligibility rules; some limited exceptions apply. Players may hold more than one non-FIFA nationality.

No.	Pos.	Nation	Player
1	GK	ENG	Elliott Taylor
2	DF	ENG	George Carline
3	DF	ENG	Eliot Putman
4	MF	ENG	Josh Walsh
5	DF	ENG	Rory McAuley
6	DF	ENG	Alex Morris
7	MF	ENG	Devon Kelly-Evans
8	MF	ENG	Connor Kennedy
9	FW	ENG	Riley O'Sullivan
10	MF	ENG	Sam Osborne
11	FW	ENG	Dempsey Arlott-John
13	GK	ENG	Mitchell Kahan
14	DF	BER	Jutorre Burgess

No.	Pos.	Nation	Player
16	DF	ENG	Paul Malone
17	FW	ENG	Terell Pennant
18	FW	ENG	Danny Newton
19	DF	ENG	Liam Dolman
20	DF	ENG	Silvio Bello
22	FW	ENG	Lovell Edwards
23	MF	ENG	Rob Morgan
24	MF	ENG	Archie O'Donnell
27	FW	COD	Britt Assombalonga
28	MF	ITA	Prince Mancinelli
30	FW	ENG	Callum Powell
31	GK	ENG	Jake Laban
33	GK	ENG	Alex Fisher

== Honours ==
- Southern League
  - Premier Division Central champions 2025–26
- United Counties League
  - Premier Division South champions 2021–22
- Northamptonshire Combination
  - Premier Division champions 2009–10
- Leicester & District Mutual League
  - Division Five champions 1977–78

== Records ==
- Best FA Cup performance: Second round, 2024–25
- Best FA Trophy performance: Third round, 2025–26
- Best FA Vase performance: Fourth round, 2021–22
- Record attendance: 1,726 vs Carlisle United, FA Trophy third round, 13 December 2025

== See also ==
- Harborough Town F.C. players
