= 2010–11 United Counties League =

Season of an English association football league

The 2010–11 United Counties League season was the 104th in the history of the United Counties League, a football competition in England.

== Premier Division ==
United Counties League Premier Division
- Season: 2010–11
- Champions: St. Neots Town
- Promoted: St. Neots Town
- Relegated: Raunds Town; Rothwell Corinthians
- Matches: 420
- Goals: 1,535 (3.65 per match)

The Premier Division featured 18 clubs which competed in the division last season, along with three new clubs:

- Irchester United, promoted from Division One
- King's Lynn Town, new club formed after King's Lynn folded
- Peterborough Northern Star, promoted from Division One

=== League table ===
Pos	Team	Pld	W	D	L	GF	GA	GD	Pts	Promotion or relegation
1	St. Neots Town	40	33	6	1	160	33	+127	105	Promoted to the Southern Football League
2	King's Lynn Town	40	33	4	3	135	39	+96	103	
3	Newport Pagnell Town	40	27	7	6	113	50	+63	88	
4	Long Buckby	40	24	7	9	84	42	+42	79	
5	Wellingborough Town	40	22	7	11	83	59	+24	73	
6	Peterborough Northern Star	40	21	7	12	75	46	+29	70	
7	Boston Town	40	21	3	16	76	65	+11	66	
8	Stewarts & Lloyds Corby	40	19	8	13	71	49	+22	65	
9	Blackstones	40	16	13	11	70	59	+11	61	
10	Irchester United	40	19	3	18	74	72	+2	60	
11	St Ives Town	40	16	8	16	60	64	−4	56	
12	Daventry United	40	18	1	21	76	81	−5	55	
13	Northampton Spencer	40	15	9	16	56	68	−12	54	
14	Deeping Rangers	40	14	3	23	74	94	−20	45	
15	Cogenhoe United	40	10	11	19	70	95	−25	41	
16	Yaxley	40	9	10	21	37	80	−43	37	
17	Holbeach United	40	10	6	24	54	90	−36	36	
18	Sleaford Town	40	9	8	23	40	87	−47	35	
19	Desborough Town	40	9	7	24	51	95	−44	34	
20	Raunds Town	40	5	2	33	45	126	−81	17	Relegated to Division One
21	Rothwell Corinthians	40	2	6	32	31	141	−110	12	Relegated to Division One

Source: fchd
Rules for classification: 1) points; 2) goal difference; 3) number of goals scored.

== Division One ==
United Counties League Division One
- Season: 2010–11
- Champions: Kempston Rovers
- Promoted: Kempston Rovers; Thrapston Town
- Matches: 272
- Goals: 955 (3.51 per match)

Division One featured 14 clubs which competed in the division last season, along with three new clubs:

- Bourne Town, demoted from the Premier Division
- Harborough Town, joined from the Northamptonshire Combination League
- Rothwell Town, resigned from the Southern Football League

=== League table ===
Pos	Team	Pld	W	D	L	GF	GA	GD	Pts	Promotion
1	Kempston Rovers	32	23	4	5	104	23	+81	73	Promoted to the Premier Division
2	Thrapston Town	32	22	3	7	86	35	+51	69	Promoted to the Premier Division
3	Bugbrooke St Michaels	32	21	2	9	81	48	+33	65	
4	Olney Town	32	15	5	12	58	51	+7	50	
5	Huntingdon Town	32	15	4	13	45	49	−4	49	
6	Eynesbury Rovers	32	14	5	13	58	55	+3	47	
7	Rothwell Town	32	13	8	11	56	53	+3	47	
8	Burton Park Wanderers	32	13	7	12	63	51	+12	46	
9	Northampton Sileby Rangers	32	12	5	15	51	60	−9	41	
10	Rushden & Higham United	32	11	6	15	40	64	−24	39	
11	Wootton Blue Cross	32	10	7	15	46	58	−12	37	
12	Bourne Town	32	11	4	17	41	63	−22	37	
13	Wellingborough Whitworth	32	9	9	14	51	62	−11	36	
14	Northampton ON Chenecks	32	11	3	18	45	75	−30	36	
15	Potton United	32	11	2	19	49	83	−34	35	
16	Buckingham Town	32	10	4	18	50	70	−20	34	
17	Harborough Town	32	9	6	17	31	55	−24	33	

Source: fchd
Rules for classification: 1) points; 2) goal difference; 3) number of goals scored.
