= Rory Watson =

English footballer (born 1996)

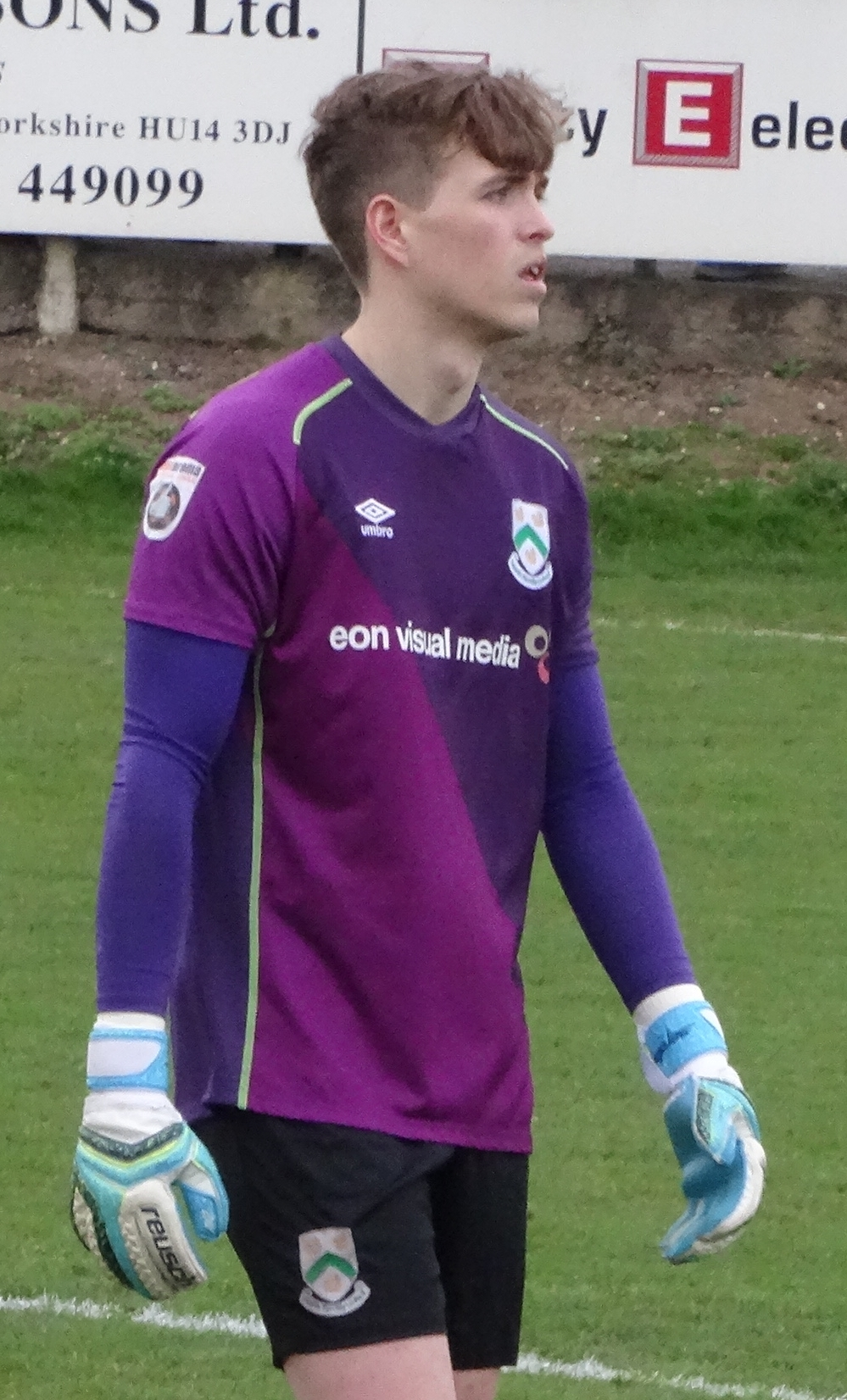
- Watson playing for North Ferriby United in 2017

Personal information
- Full name: Rory Watson
- Date of birth: 5 February 1996 (age 30)
- Place of birth: York, England
- Height: 6 ft 3 in (1.90 m)
- Position: Goalkeeper

Team information
- Current team: Harrogate Town
- Number: 30

Youth career
- 200?–2009: Leeds United
- 2009–2014: Hull City

Senior career*
Years	Team	Apps	(Gls)
2014–2017	Hull City	0	(0)
2015	→ Gainsborough Trinity (loan)	14	(0)
2015	→ Scunthorpe United (loan)	0	(0)
2016–2017	→ North Ferriby United (loan)	31	(0)
2017–2022	Scunthorpe United	85	(0)
2017	→ North Ferriby United (loan)	9	(0)
2022–2023	Wrexham	0	(0)
2023	Doncaster Rovers	0	(0)
2023–2026	York City	14	(0)
2025	→ Scunthorpe United (loan)	9	(0)
2026	→ Darlington (loan)	17	(0)
2026–	Harrogate Town	0	(0)
- * Club domestic league appearances and goals as of 18:30, 10 May 2026

Rory Watson (born 5 February 1996) is an English professional footballer who plays as goalkeeper for National League club Harrogate Town

Watson played youth football with Leeds United and Hull City, signing a professional contract with the latter in June 2014. He had loan spells with Gainsborough Trinity, Scunthorpe United and North Ferriby United before signing for Scunthorpe permanently in January 2017.

== Early life ==
Watson was born in York and was raised in the nearby village of Bishopthorpe. He attended Tadcaster Grammar School.

== Career ==
=== Early career ===
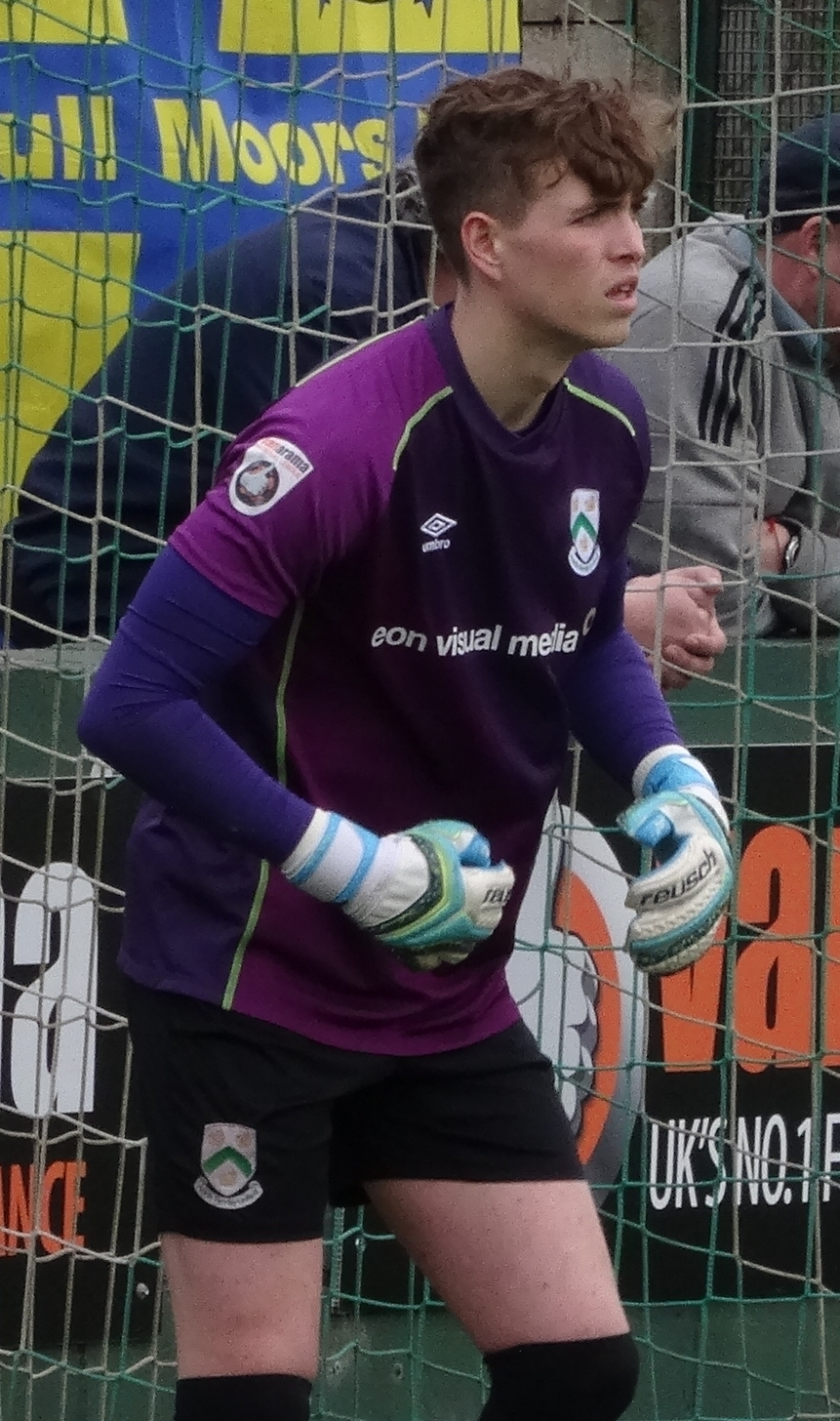
Watson playing for North Ferriby United in 2017

Watson was signed by Leeds United on schoolboy terms at the age of 10 after impressing scouts while playing for junior team Bishopthorpe White Rose. He was released in 2009 as he was deemed to not be tall enough, before joining Hull City at under-13 level. He agreed a two-year scholarship with Hull in February 2012.

Watson signed a professional contract with Hull in June 2014. His first involvement with the first team came on 25 October 2014 as an unused substitute in a 0–0 draw away to Liverpool in the Premier League. Watson joined Conference North club Gainsborough Trinity on a 6 February 2015 on a one-month loan. He made his debut when starting a 2–1 away defeat to Leamington in the league on 14 February 2015. The loan was extended until the end of the 2014–15 season, after Watson had been named man of the match in two of his four appearances. Watson finished the loan with 14 appearances as Gainsborough ranked in 17th place in the table.

He joined League One club Scunthorpe United on 10 August 2015 on a 28-day emergency loan, as cover for the suspended Luke Daniels. He did not play and was an unused substitute in three matches. On 1 July 2016, he joined newly promoted National League club North Ferriby United on loan for the 2016–17 season. He made his debut on 6 August 2016 in a 0–0 draw at home to Braintree Town, which was North Ferriby's first match at National Level.

=== Scunthorpe United ===
He was recalled from his loan ahead of permanent transfer to Scunthorpe United on a free transfer. He signed for the club on 31 January 2017 on a three-and-a-half-year contract and was immediately loaned back to North Ferriby for the rest of the season. Watson was recalled by Scunthorpe on 30 March 2017, having been an ever-present in the North Ferriby team in 2016–17 with 42 appearances. He was an unused substitute for Scunthorpe's eight remaining fixtures in 2016–17, a season that culminated in a 3–2 aggregate defeat to Millwall in the League One play-offs.

Watson started 2017–18 as backup to first-choice goalkeeper Matt Gilks, with his first-team appearances limited to the EFL Trophy. His debut for Scunthorpe had come in this competition, when starting in a 3–1 home win over Sunderland U21 on 29 August 2017. He helped Scunthorpe to the second round, when they were beaten 2–1 at home by Leicester City U21 on 5 December 2017. After Gilks picked up a calf injury, Watson made his league debut for Scunthorpe by starting a 1–1 draw away to Portsmouth on 13 January 2018. He remained in goal for three more matches before Gilks returned for a match against Fleetwood Town on 3 February 2018. Watson was next called upon as a 61st-minute substitute in the first leg of Scunthorpe's play-off semi-final against Rotherham United on 12 May 2018 after Gilks picked up an injury and conceded once as Scunthorpe drew 2–2. Watson started in the second leg four days later, which Scunthorpe lost 2–0 and were therefore eliminated 4–2 on aggregate.

Watson was released by Scunthorpe at the end of the 2021–22 season. He made 101 appearances in all competitions for the club.

=== Wrexham ===
On 4 August 2022, Watson signed for Wrexham as short-term cover following a pre-season injury to goalkeeper Christian Dibble. After being named as a substitute for the first four games of the season, he signed a contract until January 2023, and then extended his contract to the end of the 2022-23 season.

=== Doncaster Rovers ===
On 8 August 2023, Watson signed for Doncaster Rovers on an initial 1-month contract as cover for the injured Louis Jones.

=== York City ===
Watson joined York City on a season-long contract on 24 August 2023.

On 19 July 2025, Watson returned to National League side Scunthorpe United on a season-long loan deal. On 31 October, he was recalled from his loan. He was loaned back out again on 28 January 2026 to National League North club Darlington

On 11 May 2026, York announced it was releasing him.

== Career statistics ==
As of end of 2024–25 season

Appearances and goals by club, season and competition
Club	Season	League			FA Cup		EFL Cup		Other		Total	
Club	Season	Division	Apps	Goals	Apps	Goals	Apps	Goals	Apps	Goals	Apps	Goals
Hull City	2014–15	Premier League	0	0	0	0	0	0	—		0	0
Hull City	2015–16	Championship	0	0	0	0	0	0	0	0	0	0
Hull City	Total		0	0	0	0	0	0	0	0	0	0
Gainsborough Trinity (loan)	2014–15	Conference North	14	0	—		—		—		14	0
Scunthorpe United (loan)	2015–16	League One	0	0	—		0	0	—		0	0
North Ferriby United (loan)	2016–17	National League	40	0	1	0	—		1 (Note: Appearance in FA Trophy)	0	42	0
Scunthorpe United	2016–17	League One	0	0	—		—		0	0	0	0
Scunthorpe United	2017–18	League One	4	0	0	0	0	0	6 (Note: Four appearances in EFL Trophy, two in League One play-offs)	0	10	0
Scunthorpe United	2018–19	League One	5	0	0	0	1	0	0	0	6	0
Scunthorpe United	2019–20	League Two	23	0	0	0	1	0	2 (Note: Appearances in EFL Trophy)	0	26	0
Scunthorpe United	2020–21	League Two	12	0	0	0	1	0	2 (Note: Appearances in EFL Trophy)	0	15	0
Scunthorpe United	2021–22	League Two	41	0	1	0	1	0	2	0	45	0
Scunthorpe United	Total		38	0	0	0	3	0	9	0	50	0
York City	2023–24	National League	7	0	0	0	—		0	0	7	0
York City	2024–25	National League	7	0	0	0	—		0	0	7	0
York City	Total		14	0	0	0	0	0	0	0	14	0
Career total			106	0	1	0	3	0	10	0	120	0
