= Jonny Margetts =

English footballer (born 1993)

Personal information
- Full name: Jonathon Gary Margetts
- Date of birth: 28 September 1993 (age 33)
- Place of birth: Doncaster, England
- Height: 1.75 m (5 ft 9 in)
- Position: Forward

Youth career
- –2012: Hull City

Senior career*
Years	Team	Apps	(Gls)
2012–2015	Hull City	0	(0)
2014	→ Gainsborough Trinity (loan)	13	(10)
2014	→ Harrogate Town (loan)	6	(2)
2014	→ Gainsborough Trinity (loan)	7	(2)
2015	→ Cambridge United (loan)	1	(0)
2015–2016	Tranmere Rovers	10	(2)
2015–2016	→ Stockport County (loan)	6	(4)
2016	→ Altrincham (loan)	6	(2)
2016	→ Southport (loan)	3	(2)
2016	Lincoln City	7	(5)
2016–2018	Scunthorpe United	2	(0)
2017	→ Lincoln City (loan)	3	(0)
2018–2019	Boston United	6	(0)
2018–2019	→ Gainsborough Trinity (loan)		
2019	→ Matlock Town (loan)	6	(2)
2019	Tadcaster Albion		
2019–2021	Frickley Athletic	29	(26)
2021–2022	Belper Town	20	(17)
2022–2023	Stamford	52	(46)
2023–2024	Matlock Town	21	(22)
2024–2025	King's Lynn Town	48	(19)
2025–2026	Gainsborough Trinity	9	(5)
2026	Matlock Town	0	(0)
- * Club domestic league appearances and goals

Jonathon Gary Margetts (born 28 September 1993) is an English former professional footballer who played as a forward.

Having started his career with Hull City he failed to make a first team appearance, but over a two-year period he notably spent brief spells playing in the Football League for Cambridge United, Tranmere Rovers, Lincoln City and Scunthorpe United. He has since fallen out of contention in the professional game where he has played at Non-League level for Gainsborough Trinity, Harrogate Town, Stockport County, Altrincham, Southport, Boston United, Matlock Town, Tadcaster Albion and Frickley Athletic.

== Career ==
=== Hull City ===
Born in Doncaster, South Yorkshire, Margetts was a Hull City youth graduate. In July 2012, he progressed through the youth ranks into the first team and signed his first professional contract. On 27 February 2014, he joined Gainsborough Trinity in a one-month loan deal.

Margetts scored 10 goals in only 13 league appearances for Gainsborough, including a hat-trick in a 6–0 home win over Oxford City on 12 April. He returned to Hull in the summer, but was loaned to Harrogate Town on 18 August.

On 23 December 2014, Margetts returned to Gainsborough, also on a loan deal. On 13 March 2015, he joined Cambridge United on loan until the end of the season. Margetts made his professional debut on the following day, coming on as a second-half substitute in a 1–1 League Two home draw against Stevenage.

=== Tranmere Rovers ===
Following a successful pre-season trial and scoring five goals in three games, Margetts signed a one-year deal with National League club Tranmere Rovers. He joined National League North club Stockport County on loan on 27 November 2015, where he scored four goals from seven appearances. He joined National League side Altrincham on a one-month loan on 23 January 2016. On 22 March 2016, Margetts joined National League team Southport on loan for the rest of the 2015–16 season.

=== Lincoln City ===
On 14 July 2016, Margetts joined National League club Lincoln City on a one-year contract, following a successful trial.

=== Scunthorpe United ===
After scoring five goals in seven matches for Lincoln, Margetts signed for League One club Scunthorpe United on 31 August 2016 on a two-year contract for an undisclosed fee. He scored his first goal for Scunthorpe on his debut in an EFL Trophy tie against Shrewsbury Town on 4 October 2016. A loan move to Crewe Alexandra fell through in early February 2017. On 1 March 2017, Margetts rejoined Lincoln City on loan until the end of 2016–17.

=== Boston United ===
On 2 July 2018 Margetts joined Boston United.

On 23 October 2018 he returned to Gainsborough Trinity on loan for three months. He returned to Boston United in mid January 2019, but was loaned out again on 30 January, this time to Matlock Town for one month. In the beginning of March 2019, Margetts joined the same club on loan once again, this time until the end of the season.

=== Frickley Athletic ===
After a short spell at Tadcaster Albion, Margetts joined Frickley Athletic in September 2019. He was made club captain in July 2020.

In May 2021, Margetts announced that he was leaving the club.

=== Return to Matlock Town ===
In May 2023, Margetts returned to Northern Premier League club Matlock Town following a prolific title-winning season with Stamford.

=== King's Lynn Town ===
On 19 January 2024, he left Matlock Town, after an impressive season, and joined National League North side King's Lynn Town. He started the next day against Hereford in a league match that ended 2-2.

=== Return to Gainsborough Trinity ===
On 16 May 2025, Margetts returned to Northern Premier League Premier Division side Gainsborough Trinity.

=== Return to Matlock Town and retirement ===
Margetts returned to Matlock Town in time for the 2026–27 season but was forced to retire from playing after suffering a reaction following knee surgery.

== Career statistics ==
As of match played 6 Oct 2025

Appearances and goals by club, season and competition
Club	Season	League			FA Cup		League Cup		Other		Total	
Club	Season	Division	Apps	Goals	Apps	Goals	Apps	Goals	Apps	Goals	Apps	Goals
Hull City	2013–14	Premier League	0	0	0	0	0	0	—		0	0
Hull City	2014–15	Premier League	0	0	—		0	0	0	0	0	0
Hull City	Total		0	0	0	0	0	0	0	0	0	0
Gainsborough Trinity (loan)	2013–14	Conference North	13	10	—		—		—		13	10
Harrogate Town (loan)	2014–15	Conference North	6	2	—		—		—		6	2
Gainsborough Trinity (loan)	2014–15	Conference North	7	2	—		—		—		7	2
Cambridge United (loan)	2014–15	League Two	1	0	—		—		—		1	0
Tranmere Rovers	2015–16	National League	10	2	1	0	—		—		11	2
Stockport County (loan)	2015–16	National League North	6	4	—		—		1 (Note: Appearance in FA Trophy)	0	7	4
Altrincham (loan)	2015–16	National League	6	2	—		—		—		6	2
Southport (loan)	2015–16	National League	3	2	—		—		—		3	2
Lincoln City	2016–17	National League	7	5	—		—		—		7	5
Scunthorpe United	2016–17	League One	2	0	0	0	—		3 (Note: Appearances in EFL Trophy)	1	5	1
Lincoln City (loan)	2016–17	National League	3	0	1	0	—		0	0	4	0
Gainsborough Trinity F.C.	2025–26	Northern Premier League	9	5	3	3	—		1	1	13	9
Career total			73	34	5	3	0	0	5	2	83	39
