= Josh Morris (footballer, born 1991) =

English footballer

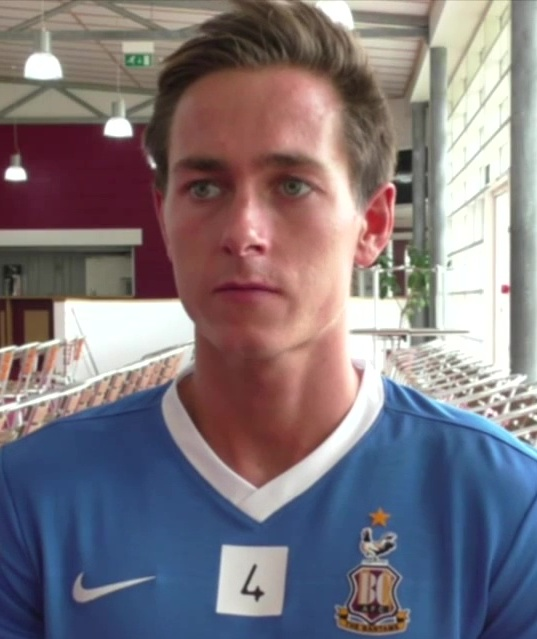
- Morris in 2015

Personal information
- Full name: Joshua Francis Morris
- Date of birth: 30 September 1991 (age 35)
- Place of birth: Preston, England
- Height: 5 ft 11 in (1.80 m)
- Position: Midfielder

Youth career
- –2010: Blackburn Rovers

Senior career*
Years	Team	Apps	(Gls)
2010–2015	Blackburn Rovers	20	(0)
2012	→ Yeovil Town (loan)	5	(0)
2012	→ Rotherham United (loan)	5	(0)
2013	→ Carlisle United (loan)	6	(0)
2014	→ Fleetwood Town (loan)	14	(2)
2014–2015	→ Fleetwood Town (loan)	45	(8)
2015–2016	Bradford City	13	(1)
2016–2019	Scunthorpe United	107	(35)
2019–2021	Fleetwood Town	57	(7)
2021–2022	Salford City	21	(1)
2022–2023	Motherwell	9	(0)

International career
2011	England U20	3	(0)
- * Club domestic league appearances and goals as of 11:34, 31 May 2023 (UTC)

Joshua Francis Morris (born 30 September 1991) is an English professional footballer who plays as a midfielder.

Beginning his career in the Premier League with Blackburn Rovers, Morris experienced loan spells with Football League teams Yeovil Town, Rotherham United, Carlisle United, and multiple stints with Fleetwood Town, before departing for Bradford City in 2015.

After a year, he moved to Scunthorpe United where he would play over 100 games and was named in the PFA League One Team of the Year for 2016–17, having scored 19 goals. In 2019 he rejoined Fleetwood, and left after a two-year spell. After one year with Salford City, Morris signed for Scottish club Motherwell in July 2022.

Internationally, Morris represented England U20 in 2011, and featured in that year's FIFA U20 World Cup.

== Club career ==
=== Blackburn Rovers ===
Born in Preston, England, Morris joined Blackburn Rovers when he was thirteen. On 15 September 2010, Morris signed a two-year deal until the summer 2012 with an option of a further year at Ewood Park. A product of Rovers youth system, he made his first league appearance in the 7–1 defeat by Manchester United on 27 November, supplying the assist for Rovers' goal. Morris went on to make four appearances for the club in the 2010–11 season.

His first appearance in the 2011–12 season was as a substitute in Blackburn's 3–2 victory against Manchester United. With his contract due to expire at the end of the season, on 22 February 2012, Morris signed a new 2 1/2-year deal at the club. With Blackburn already relegated, Morris made another appearance in the last game of the season, coming on as a substitute for Mauro Formica, in a 2–1 loss against Chelsea.

In the 2012–13 season, Morris spent the first half of the season being at the reserve and was loaned out to Rotherham United. Morris made his first appearance for Blackburn Rovers, where he came on as a substitute for Rubén Rochina in the 80th minute, in a 1–1 draw against Wolves on 11 January 2013. Towards the end of the 2012–13 season, Morris became a regular starter as a left-back following defensive crisis and went on to make seven starts.

In the 2013–14 season, Morris made his first Blackburn Rovers appearance, coming on as a substitute for Jason Lowe in the 74th minute, in a 5–2 win over Barnsley on 24 August 2013. By the first half of the season, Morris went on to make four appearances for the club. Following his return from Carlisle United, Morris was an un-used substitute for five matches, as well as, playing in the reserve once.

==== Loan spells ====
On 22 March 2012, Morris signed for League One club Yeovil Town on loan until the end of the 2011–12 season. Morris made his Yeovil two days later, playing as a left-midfielder in a 1–0 loss against Hartlepool United. Morris made five appearances for the club despite suffering an illness that saw him miss three matches before returning to his parent club.

Morris signed for Rotherham United on loan on 25 October 2012, until January with the potential for an extension of until the end of the season. Morris made his debut the next day, playing as a left-back in a 1–0 win over Plymouth Argyle. However, Morris suffered a knock, which put an end to his loan spell at Rotherham having made five appearances for the club.

On 28 November 2013, Morris joined League One club Carlisle United on loan until 1 January 2014. Morris made his Carlisle debut two days later, coming on as a substitute for Matty Robson in the 55th minute, in a 3–1 loss against Swindon Town. Morris made his final appearance for the club, in a 2–1 loss against Crewe Alexandra before returning to his parent club.

==== Fleetwood Town loans ====
On 25 February 2014, Morris joined League Two club Fleetwood Town on a one-month loan. On the same day he made his Fleetwood debut, coming on as a substitute for Mark Roberts in the 64th minute in a 4–0 loss against Plymouth. After making seven appearances, it was announced on 27 March 2014, Morris agreed to stay with Fleetwood until the end of the 2013–14 season. Morris then scored two goals in two matches against Cheltenham Town and Wycombe Wanderers. His performances in April saw Morris being awarded for Sky Bet League 2 Player of the Month for April. Morris was also involved in three matches in the play-offs, including the final, where he started, as Fleetwood won 1–0 against Burton Albion on 26 May, which won promotion to League One. Following this, Morris made his return to his parent club, with manager Gary Bowyer considered using Morris next season.

On 10 July 2014, it was announced that Morris would be joining Fleetwood on loan again until January 2015. Upon joining the club for the second time, Morris expressed his delight to make a return to the club. Morris was given number 12 shirt ahead of the new season. Morris' first appearance in his second spell at Fleetwood came in the opening game of the season, in 2–1 win over Crewe. It took until 20 September for him to score his first goal of the season and providing an assist for Jamie Proctor, in a 3–3 draw against Bristol City. Morris scored three goals in two consecutive matches between 28 December 2014 and 3 January 2015 against Rochdale and scoring a double against Swindon.

Five days after scoring a brace, it was announced on 8 January that Morris would again return to Fleetwood on loan until the end of the 2014–15 season. Morris then scored three goals in three consecutive appearances in March, against Scunthorpe United, Sheffield United and Rochdale. In the last game of the season, Morris scored his eighth goal of the season, in a 2–1 win over Port Vale. Morris made forty-five appearances and scored eight times. Following this, Morris returned to his parent club.

=== Bradford City ===
With his contract at Blackburn Rovers at the end of the 2014–15 season, On 1 July 2015, Morris signed for Bradford City on a three-year deal. Upon joining the club, Morris was given number fourteen shirt.

Morris scored four minutes into his debut for the club against Swindon Town on the opening day of the season, but a second-half hat-trick from Nathan Byrne eventually condemned Bradford to a 4–1 defeat.

=== Scunthorpe United ===
He signed for Scunthorpe United on a free transfer on 15 June 2016, signing a three-year contract. He scored on his debut in a 3–1 win over Bristol Rovers on 6 August. He scored the first hat-trick of his career in a 4–1 victory over Walsall on 27 September.

He was released by Scunthorpe at the end of the 2018–19 season.

=== Return to Fleetwood Town ===
Morris re-joined Fleetwood Town on a two-year deal following his release from Scunthorpe.

=== Salford City ===
On 22 June 2021, it was announced that Morris has signed a two-year contract with League Two side Salford City, where he reunited with former Blackburn manager Gary Bowyer. On 10 August, Morris scored his first two goals in a 3–3 draw against Championship team Derby County in the first round of the EFL Cup, before converting his penalty in the resulting shootout which Salford lost 5–3. His first league goal came on 4 September, scoring the equaliser shortly before half-time before Salford lost 2–1 to his former team Carlisle. Morris left Salford by mutual termination of his contract on 11 July 2022.

=== Motherwell ===
On 11 July 2022, Motherwell announced the signing of Morris to a two-year contract. On 31 May 2023, Motherwell announced that Morris had been released from his contract early.

== International career ==
In February 2011, Morris was called up by England U20 and made his England U20 debut against France U20 on 9 February 2011. Morris was called up by FIFA U-20 World Cup in July 2011 and went on to make two appearances.

== Controversies ==
On 4 May 2019, Morris was involved in a controversial incident described as "the most unsporting goal in Home Park history". During an EFL League One fixture between Plymouth Argyle and Scunthorpe United, Plymouth goalkeeper Matt Macey attempted to throw the ball out of play so he could receive treatment for a suspected broken ankle. However, Morris ran to retrieve the ball to keep it in play and subsequently chipped the injured keeper to equalise. Described as an "appalling lack of sportsmanship", and condemned by Scunthorpe chairman Peter Swann, Scunthorpe refused to allow Plymouth to score a conciliatory goal. Plymouth won the match, but the result saw both teams relegated to the fourth tier. Following the match, Swann stated he was "very disappointed" with both Morris and the senior players involved and apologised "wholeheartedly" to everyone who had witnessed the event.

== Career statistics ==
As of match played 9 November 2022

Appearances and goals by club, season and competition
Club!	Season	League			National Cup (Note: Includes FA Cup)		League Cup (Note: Includes League Cup, Scottish League Cup)		Other		Total	
Club!	Season	Division	Apps	Goals	Apps	Goals	Apps	Goals	Apps	Goals	Apps	Goals
Blackburn Rovers	2010–11	Premier League	4	0	1	0	0	0	—		5	0
Blackburn Rovers	2011–12	Premier League	2	0	0	0	0	0	—		2	0
Blackburn Rovers	2012–13	Championship	10	0	—		0	0	—		10	0
Blackburn Rovers	2013–14	Championship	4	0	0	0	1	0	—		5	0
Blackburn Rovers	2014–15	Championship	0	0	—		—		—		0	0
Blackburn Rovers	Total		20	0	1	0	1	0	—		22	0
Yeovil Town (loan)	2011–12	League One	5	0	—		—		—		5	0
Rotherham United (loan)	2012–13	League Two	5	0	1	0	—		—		6	0
Carlisle United (loan)	2013–14	League One	6	0	—		—		—		6	0
Fleetwood Town (loan)	2013–14	League Two	14	2	—		—		3 (Note: Appearances in League Two play-offs)	0	17	2
Fleetwood Town (loan)	2014–15	League One	45	8	0	0	1	0	1 (Note: Appearance in Football League Trophy)	0	47	8
Fleetwood Town (loan)	Total		59	10	0	0	1	0	4	0	64	10
Bradford City	2015–16	League One	13	1	2	0	1	0	0	0	16	1
Scunthorpe United	2016–17	League One	44	19	1	0	2	1	5 (Note: Three appearances in EFL Trophy, two appearances in League One play-offs)	0	52	20
Scunthorpe United	2017–18	League One	44	11	2	0	2	0	3 (Note: One appearance and one goal in EFL Trophy, two appearances in League One play-offs)	1	51	12
Scunthorpe United	2018–19	League One	19	5	1	0	1	0	1 (Note: Appearance(s) in EFL Trophy)	0	22	5
Scunthorpe United	Total		107	35	4	0	5	1	9	1	125	37
Fleetwood Town	2019–20	League One	33	7	3	1	1	0	4 (Note: Four appearances and two goals in EFL Trophy, two appearances in League One play-offs)	2	43	10
Fleetwood Town	2020–21	League One	24	0	1	0	3	3	2	0	31	2
Fleetwood Town	Total		57	7	4	1	4	2	9	2	74	12
Salford City	2021–22	League Two	21	1	2	0	1	2	0	0	24	3
Motherwell	2022–23	Scottish Premiership	9	0	0	0	1	0	2 (Note: Appearances in UEFA Europa Conference League)	0	12	0
Career total			302	54	14	1	14	5	24	3	354	63

== Honours ==
Fleetwood Town

- Football League Two play-offs: 2014

Individual

- EFL Team of the Season: 2016–17
- PFA Team of the Year: 2016–17 League One
