= 2016–17 Scunthorpe United F.C. season =

Scunthorpe United
2016–17 season
- Chairman: Peter Swann
- Manager: Graham Alexander
- Stadium: Glanford Park
- League One: 3rd
- FA Cup: First round (eliminated by Charlton Athletic)
- League Cup: Second round (eliminated by Bristol City)
- Football League Trophy: Third round (eliminated by Oxford United)
- Top goalscorer: League: Josh Morris (19); All: Josh Morris (20)
Home colours	Away colours

The 2016–17 season was Scunthorpe United's 118th season in their existence and their third consecutive season in League One. Along with competing in League One, the club also participated in the FA Cup, League Cup and JP Trophy. The season covers the period from 1 July 2016 to 30 June 2017.

== Competitions ==
=== Pre-season friendlies ===
8 July 2016	Stamford	0–3	Scunthorpe United	Stamford
19:00		Report	Holmes 12', 45'; Madden 56'	Stadium: Zeeco Stadium

23 July 2016	Scunthorpe United	0–2	Hull City	Scunthorpe
15:00		Report	Maloney 24'; Hernández 65'	Stadium: Glanford Park; Attendance: 2,085

26 July 2016	Scunthorpe United	2–1	Rotherham United	Scunthorpe
19:30	van Veen 16'; Morris 86'	Report	Wood 23'	Stadium: Glanford Park; Attendance: 1,466

=== League One ===
==== League table ====
Pos	Team	Pld	W	D	L	GF	GA	GD	Pts	Promotion, qualification or relegation
1	Sheffield United (C, P)	46	30	10	6	92	47	+45	100	Promotion to the EFL Championship
2	Bolton Wanderers (P)	46	25	11	10	68	36	+32	86	Promotion to the EFL Championship
3	Scunthorpe United	46	24	10	12	80	54	+26	82	Qualification for the League One play-offs (Note: Four teams play for one spot and promotion to the EFL Championship.)
4	Fleetwood Town	46	23	13	10	64	43	+21	82	Qualification for the League One play-offs
5	Bradford City	46	20	19	7	62	43	+19	79	Qualification for the League One play-offs

Source: BBC Sport
Rules for classification: 1) Points; 2) Goal difference; 3) Number of goals scored
(C) Champions; (P) Promoted

==== Matches ====
6 August 2016 1	Scunthorpe United	3–1	Bristol Rovers	Scunthorpe
15:00 BST	van Veen 66'; Morris 81'; Clarke (yellow card) 87'; Wootton 90+6'	Report	Clarke (yellow card) 11'; Taylor 31'; Lockyer (yellow card) 40'	Stadium: Glanford Park; Attendance: 4,636

13 August 2016 2	Fleetwood Town	2–2	Scunthorpe United	Fleetwood
15:00 BST	Jónsson 37'; Ball 51'; Kip (yellow card) 82'	Report	Hopper 63' van Veen 67' (yellow card) 80'	Stadium: Highbury Stadium; Attendance: 2,509 (486 away)

16 August 2016 3	AFC Wimbledon	1–2	Scunthorpe United	Norbiton
19:45 BST	Barnett (yellow card) 39'; Charles 61'	Report	Hopper 23'; Morris 41' (pen.) van Veen (yellow card) 54'	Stadium: Kingsmeadow; Attendance: 4,163 (372 away)

20 August 2016 4	Scunthorpe United	5–0	Gillingham	Scunthorpe
15:00 BST	van Veen 5'; Morris 20', 59' (pen.); Clarke 45+2'; Hopper 82'	Report	(yellow card) 64' Emmanuel-Thomas	Stadium: Glanford Park; Attendance: 3,718; Referee: David Webb

27 August 2016 5	Port Vale	3–1	Scunthorpe United	Burslem
15:00 BST	Thomas (yellow card) 19'; Forrester 33'; Jones 49', 84'	Report	Clarke (yellow card) 23' (yellow-red card) 55'; Morris 45+2'; Townsend (yellow card) 58'	Stadium: Vale Park; Attendance: 4,557 (373 away)

10 September 2016 6	Scunthorpe United	4–0	Southend United	Scunthorpe
15:00 BST	Madden 36' van Veen 41'; Morris 57'; Smallwood 87'			Stadium: Glanford Park; Attendance: 3,723; Referee: John Brookes

17 September 2016 7	Shrewsbury Town	0–1	Scunthorpe United	Shrewsbury
15:00 BST	Deegan (yellow card) 32'; Whalley (yellow card) 45+1'; McGivern (yellow card) 57'; Grimmer (yellow card) 89'; Dodds (yellow card) 90+3'	BBC Report	Clarke (yellow card) 36'; Mirfin 45+5'	Stadium: Greenhous Meadow; Attendance: 4,878 (409 away); Referee: John Busby

20 September 2016 8	Scunthorpe United	0–0	Charlton Athletic	Scunthorpe
19:45 BST		BBC Report		Stadium: Glanford Park; Attendance: 3,801; Referee: Chris Sarginson

24 September 2016 9	Scunthorpe United	2–2	Sheffield United	Scunthorpe
15:00 BST	Clarke (yellow card) 33' van Veen (yellow card) 44'; Morris 55'; Wallace (yellow card) 62'; Holmes 82'; Mirfin (yellow card) 85'	BBC Report	(yellow card) 14' Ebanks-Landell; 34' (red card) 69' Basham; (yellow card) 42' Done; 85' (pen.) Sharp	Stadium: Glanford Park; Attendance: 6,243; Referee: Darren Deadman

27 September 2016 10	Walsall	1–4	Scunthorpe United	Walsall
19:45 BST	Kinsella (yellow card) 10'; Oztumer 45'; Makris (yellow card) 90+2'	Report	11' (pen.), 13', 82' Morris; 47' Bishop	Stadium: The Banks's Stadium; Attendance: 3,970; Referee: Michael Salisbury

1 October 2016 11	Bury	1–2	Scunthorpe United	Bury
15:00 BST	Soares (yellow card) 35' (goal) 58'; Mellis (yellow card) 41'; Kay (yellow card) 80'; Etuhu (yellow card) 90+1'	Report	Wiseman 42'; Wallace (yellow card) 45+2'; Morris 65' van Veen (yellow card) 80'	Stadium: Gigg Lane; Attendance: 5,355; Referee: David Webb

8 October 2016 12	Scunthorpe United	1–1	Northampton Town	Scunthorpe
15:00 BST	Morris 44'; Dawson (yellow card) 47'; Bishop (yellow card) 70'	Report	Diamond (yellow card) 45+1'; Taylor (red card) 59'; McCourt 74'	Stadium: Glanford Park; Attendance: 4,714; Referee: Darren Handley

15 October 2016 13	Scunthorpe United	2–1	Milton Keynes Dons	Scunthorpe
15:00 BST	Holmes (yellow card) 22'; Madden 65', 81'; Bishop (yellow card) 75'	Report	37' Agard; (yellow card) 54' Bowditch; (yellow card) 58' Reeves; (yellow card) 70' Walsh; (yellow card) 75' Carruthers; (yellow card) 79' Downing; (yellow card) 88' Lewington; (yellow card) 90+2' Maynard	Stadium: Glanford Park; Attendance: 4,238; Referee: Mark Haywood

18 October 2016 14	Oldham Athletic	2–0	Scunthorpe United	Oldham
19:45 BST	Ladapo 42'; Erwin 45+1'; Dummigan (yellow card) 87'	Report	Bishop (yellow card) 45+2'; Morris (yellow card) 90+5'	Stadium: Boundary Park; Attendance: 2,911; Referee: Darren England

22 October 2016 15	Chesterfield	0–3	Scunthorpe United	Chesterfield
15:00 BST	Anderson (yellow card) 83'	Report	Morris 49' van Veen 60'; Dawson (yellow card) 79'; Mantom 85'	Stadium: Proact Stadium; Attendance: 6,328; Referee: Oliver Langford

29 October 2016 16	Scunthorpe United	4–1	Swindon Town	Scunthorpe
15:00 BST	Madden 15', 45+1'; Holmes 21' van Veen 43'; Bishop (yellow card) 49'; Dawson (yellow card) 79'	Report	52', (yellow card) 77' Thompson; (yellow card) 58' Furlong; (yellow card) 90+2' Stewart	Stadium: Glanford Park; Attendance: 4,262; Referee: Seb Stockbridge

12 November 2016 17	Coventry City	0–1	Scunthorpe United	Coventry
15:00 GMT	Turnbull (yellow card) 68'; Rúben Lameiras (yellow card) 90+2'	Report	Morris 55'; Holmes (yellow card) 60'; Goode (yellow card) 66'	Stadium: Ricoh Arena; Attendance: 9,737; Referee: Jonathan Moss

19 November 2016 18	Scunthorpe United	1–0	Oldham Athletic	Scunthorpe
15:00 GMT	van Veen (yellow card) 38'; Wiseman 80'	Report	Green (yellow card) 58' (yellow-red card) 65'; Banks (yellow card) 67'; Ripley (yellow card) 79'; Fané (yellow card) 90+3'	Stadium: Glanford Park; Attendance: 4,323; Referee: Graham Salisbury

22 November 2016 19	Peterborough United	0–2	Scunthorpe United	Peterborough
19:45 GMT	Baldwin (yellow card) 23'; Coulthirst (yellow card) 45+1'; Edwards (yellow card) 67'	Report	van Veen 21' (yellow card) 24'; Goode (yellow card) 72'; Bishop 83'	Stadium: ABAX Stadium; Attendance: 5,222; Referee: Charles Breakspear

26 November 2016 20	Scunthorpe United	1–1	Oxford United	Scunthorpe
15:00 GMT	Holmes 35'; Townsend (yellow card) 89'	Report	Ledson (yellow card) 36'; Dunkley (yellow card) 40'; Edwards 47'; Hall (yellow card) 56'	Stadium: Glanford Park; Attendance: 4,338; Referee: Michael Salisbury

10 December 2016 21	Rochdale	3–2	Scunthorpe United	Rochdale
15:00 GMT	Thompson 41'; Rathbone 53'; Andrew 75'; Henderson (yellow card) 90+1'	Report	Bishop (yellow card) 17' (goal) 84'; Hopper 80'	Stadium: Crown Oil Arena; Attendance: 3,445; Referee: Ben Toner

17 December 2016 22	Scunthorpe United	3–0	Millwall	Scunthorpe
15:00 GMT	Madden (yellow card) 2' (goal) 36', 67'; Adelakun 45'; Wallace (yellow card) 46'	Report	Romeo (yellow card) 22'; Martin (yellow card) 36'; Hutchinson (yellow card) 61'; Thompson (yellow card) 76'; Williams (yellow card) 86'	Stadium: Glanford Park; Attendance: 4,355; Referee: Roger East

26 December 2016 23	Bradford City	0–0	Scunthorpe United	Bradford
15:00 GMT	Vincelot (yellow card) 35'; Hanson (yellow card) 56'	Report	Madden (yellow card) 23'; Bishop (yellow card) 55'	Stadium: The Coral Windows Stadium; Attendance: 21,874; Referee: Darren Handley

31 December 2016 24	Bolton Wanderers	2–1	Scunthorpe United	Bolton
15:00 GMT	Vela 17'; Spearing (yellow card) 61'; Beevers (yellow card) 69'; Taylor (yellow card) 78'; Henry 90+4'	Report	Dawson (yellow card) 45'; Bishop 62'; Clarke (yellow card) 80'; Mantom (yellow card) 90' van Veen (yellow card) 90+7'	Stadium: Macron Stadium; Attendance: 17,062; Referee: Andrew Madley

2 January 2017 25	Scunthorpe United	1–1	Peterborough United	Scunthorpe
15:00 GMT	Morris 45+1'	Report	Tafazolli (yellow card) 13'; Maddison (yellow card) 42'; Hughes (yellow card) 45+1'; Goode 83' (o.g.)	Stadium: Glanford Park; Attendance: 4,855; Referee: Andy Haines

7 January 2017 26	Scunthorpe United	3–2	Bury	Scunthorpe
15:00 GMT	Toffolo 8'; Dawson 19'; Wallace (yellow card) 33'; Morris 44'	Report	Miller 41'; Pope (yellow card) 45+2'; Etuhu 67'	Stadium: Glanford Park; Attendance: 5,173; Referee: Eddie Ilderton

14 January 2017 27	Northampton Town	1–2	Scunthorpe United	Northampton
15:00 GMT	Richards (yellow card) 33'; Revell 42' (yellow card) 88'; O'Toole (yellow card) 61'	Report	van Veen 21' (yellow card) 61'; Mantom (yellow card) 25'; Dawson (yellow card) 59'; Morris 83'; Holmes (yellow card) 83'	Stadium: Sixfields Stadium; Attendance: 5,649; Referee: Graham Horwood

28 January 2017 28	Scunthorpe United	3–2	Port Vale	Scunthorpe
15:00 GMT	Morris 49' (pen.); Toney 62'; Hopper 71'	Report	Guy (yellow card) 12'; Walker 38'; Hooper 59'	Stadium: Glanford Park; Attendance: 4,442; Referee: Darren England

4 February 2017 29	Southend United	3–1	Scunthorpe United	Southend-on-Sea
15:00 GMT	Fortuné 39'; Timlin (yellow card) 57'; Wordsworth (yellow card) 71'; Cox 76'; Leonard 81' (yellow card) 85'	Report	Wallace 5' (yellow card) 8'; Holmes (yellow card) 41'; Dawson (yellow card) 45+1'; Bishop (red card) 85'; Toney (yellow card) 90+3'	Stadium: Roots Hall; Attendance: 7,346; Referee: Robert Madley

11 February 2017 30	Scunthorpe United	0–1	Shrewsbury Town	Scunthorpe
15:00 GMT	Wallace (yellow card) 68'	Report	Nsiala (yellow card) 40'; Ladapo 69'	Stadium: Glanford Park; Attendance: 4,367; Referee: Brett Huxtable

14 February 2017 31	Scunthorpe United	0–0	Walsall	Scunthorpe
19:45 GMT	Ness (yellow card) 18'	Report	Chambers (yellow card) 27'; McCarthy (yellow card) 64'; Edwards (yellow card) 67'	Stadium: Glanford Park; Attendance: 3,168; Referee: Graham Salisbury

18 February 2017 32	Sheffield United	1–1	Scunthorpe United	Sheffield
15:00 GMT	Sharp 49' (yellow card) 87'; Coutts (yellow card) 58'; Duffy (yellow card) 77'; Fleck (yellow card) 90+7'	Report	Toffolo (yellow card) 10' (yellow-red card) 51' van Veen (yellow card) 35'; Madden 47'; Bishop (yellow card) 59'; Dawson (yellow card) 88'	Stadium: Bramall Lane; Attendance: 27,980; Referee: Mike Jones

25 February 2017 33	Bristol Rovers	1–1	Scunthorpe United	Bristol
15:00 GMT	Clarke 39'	Report	Sutton (yellow card) 10'; Lockyer 73' (o.g.)	Stadium: Memorial Stadium; Attendance: 8,784; Referee: Darren Deadman

28 February 2017 34	Scunthorpe United	1–2	AFC Wimbledon	Scunthorpe
19:45 GMT	Mirfin (yellow card) 7'; Morris 74'	Report	Barcham (yellow card) 37'; Taylor (yellow card) 57'; Parrett 60' (yellow card) 73'; Poleon 69'; Soares (yellow card) 85'	Stadium: Glanford Park; Attendance: 3,368; Referee: Sebastian Stockbridge

4 March 2017 35	Scunthorpe United	0–2	Fleetwood Town	Scunthorpe
15:00 GMT	Morris (yellow card) 11'; Madden (yellow card) 64'; Dawson (yellow card) 64'	Report	Cole (yellow card) 29' (goal) 41'; Grant 90'	Stadium: Glanford Park; Attendance: 5,541; Referee: Peter Bankes

7 March 2017 36	Charlton Athletic	2–1	Scunthorpe United	Charlton, London
19:45 GMT	Jackson 33'; Holmes (yellow card) 58'; Byrne (yellow card) 82'; Ulvestad (yellow card) 85'; Watt 90' (pen.) (yellow card) 90+1'; Chicksen (yellow card) 90+2'	Report	van Veen 75'	Stadium: The Valley; Attendance: 9,088; Referee: Dean Whitestone

11 March 2017 37	Gillingham	3–2	Scunthorpe United	Gillingham
15:00 GMT	Ehmer (yellow card) 26'; Herd (yellow card) 34'; Wright 77' (pen.), 82' (pen.), 86' (pen.) (yellow card) 86'; Byrne (yellow card) 90+3'	Report	Madden 4' (yellow card) 50' van Veen (yellow card) 70'; Toffolo 73' (yellow card) 85'; Clarke (yellow card) 88'; Toney (yellow card) 89'	Stadium: Priestfield Stadium; Attendance: 6,851; Referee: Robert Lewis

14 March 2017 38	Scunthorpe United	2–1	Rochdale	Scunthorpe
19:45 GMT	Mirfin (yellow card) 17'; Toffolo (yellow card) 24'; Clarke (yellow card) 45+3'; Madden 54'; Crooks 90+3'	Report	Rafferty (yellow card) 32'; Henderson 41' (yellow card) 84'; Camps (yellow card) 85'	Stadium: Glanford Park; Attendance: 3,225; Referee: David Webb

18 March 2017 39	Oxford United	2–1	Scunthorpe United	Oxford
15:00 GMT	Lundstram 52'; Nelson 90+1'	Report	Madden 12'	Stadium: Kassam Stadium; Attendance: 7,652; Referee: Tim Robinson

26 March 2017 40	Scunthorpe United	3–2	Bradford City	Scunthorpe
12:30 GMT	Toney 3', 47'; Crooks 82' (yellow card) 90+3'	Report	Toner 14'; Jones 16'; McMahon (yellow card) 34'; Clarke (yellow card) 42'	Stadium: Glanford Park; Attendance: 5,247; Referee: Darren Deadman

1 April 2017 41	Millwall	3–1	Scunthorpe United	Bermondsey, London
15:00 GMT	Williams 3' (pen.); Ferguson 57'; Morison (yellow card) 62'; O'Brien 68'; Worrall (yellow card) 90+3'	Report	Sutton (yellow card) 86'; Crooks 90+4'	Stadium: The Den; Attendance: 9,789; Referee: Nigel Miller

8 April 2017 42	Scunthorpe United	1–0	Bolton Wanderers	Scunthorpe
15:00 BST	Mirfin 11'; Crooks (yellow card) 33'; Bishop (yellow card) 64'; Wallace (yellow card) 80'	Report	Vela (yellow card) 33'	Stadium: Glanford Park; Attendance: 6,149; Referee: David Webb

14 April 2017 43	Milton Keynes Dons	0–1	Scunthorpe United	Milton Keynes
15:00 BST		Report	Toney 29'	Stadium: stadium:mk Attendance: 9,274; Referee: Graham Horwood

17 April 2017 44	Scunthorpe United	3–1	Chesterfield	Scunthorpe
15:00 BST	McGinn 21' (o.g.); Toney 37', 73'; Wiseman (yellow card) 83'	Report	Anderson 90+2'	Stadium: Glanford Park; Attendance: 4,636; Referee: Darren Drysdale

22 April 2017 45	Swindon Town	1–2	Scunthorpe United	Swindon
15:00 BST	Branco (yellow card) 41'; Ince 85'	Report	Wallace 5'; Toney (yellow card) 45+1'; Mantom 71'	Stadium: County Ground; Attendance: 7,579; Referee: Nick Kinseley

30 April 2017 46	Scunthorpe United	3–1	Coventry City	Scunthorpe
12:00 BST	van Veen 52'; Bishop 84'; Townsend (yellow card) 88'; Adelakun 89'	Report	Camwell (yellow card) 35'; Gadzhev 36'	Stadium: Glanford Park; Referee: Richard Clark

==== Play-offs ====
4 May 2017 Semi-final first leg	Millwall	0–0	Scunthorpe United	Bermondsey, London
19:45 BST	Morison (yellow card) 42'; Ferguson (yellow card) 69'; Craig (yellow card) 87'	Report	Toney (yellow card) 24'; Wallace (yellow card) 64'	Stadium: The Den; Referee: Andrew Madley

7 May 2017 Semi-final second leg	Scunthorpe United	2–3 (2–3 agg.)	Millwall	Scunthorpe
18:30 BST	Toney 19'; Dawson (yellow card) 35' (goal) 81'; Ness (yellow card) 51'; Bishop (yellow card) 88'	Report	Abdou (yellow card) 39'; Williams (yellow card) 41'; Morison 45', 58'; Gregory 52'	Stadium: Glanford Park; Referee: Chris Kavanagh

=== FA Cup ===
5 November 2016 First round	Charlton Athletic	3–1	Scunthorpe United	Charlton, London
15:00 GMT	Bauer (yellow card) 12'; Lookman 34', 83'; Jackson 40'	Report	Hopper 52' van Veen (yellow card) 72'; Townsend (yellow card) 80'; Williams (yellow card) 90'	Stadium: The Valley; Attendance: 4,123; Referee: Chris Sarginson

=== EFL Cup ===
9 August 2016 First round	Scunthorpe United	2–0 (a.e.t.)	Notts County	Scunthorpe
19:45 BST	van Veen 100', 115'	Report		Stadium: Glanford Park; Attendance: 2,158

23 August 2016 Second round	Scunthorpe United	1–2	Bristol City	Scunthorpe
19:45 BST	Morris 60' (pen.); Dawson (yellow card) 72' van Veen (yellow card) 96'	Report	35' Reid; (yellow card) 65' Golbourne; 97' Abraham	Stadium: Glanford Park; Attendance: 2,397; Referee: Ross Joyce

=== EFL Trophy ===
Pos	Div	Team	Pld	W	PW	PL	L	GF	GA	GD	Pts	Qualification
1	L1	Scunthorpe United	3	3	0	0	0	6	1	+5	9	Advance to Round 2
2	L2	Cambridge United	3	2	0	0	1	3	3	0	6	Advance to Round 2
3	L1	Shrewsbury Town	3	1	0	0	2	3	3	0	3	
4	ACA	Middlesbrough U21	3	0	0	0	3	2	7	−5	0	

Source: Sky Sports

30 August 2016 Group Stage Game 1	Scunthorpe United	2–1	Middlesbrough U23	Scunthorpe
19:45 BST	Wallace 63'; Adelakun 73'		Elsdon (yellow card) 55'; Cooke 72'	Stadium: Glanford Park

4 October 2016 Group Stage Game 2	Scunthorpe United	2–0	Shrewsbury Town	Scunthorpe
19:45 BST	Lancashire 10' (o.g.); Margetts 56'	Report	Sarcevic (yellow card) 29'; Toney (yellow card) 61'	Stadium: Glanford Park; Attendance: 1,316; Referee: Nigel Miller

8 November 2016 Group Stage Game 3	Cambridge United	0–2	Scunthorpe United	Cambridge
19:45 GMT	Elito (yellow card) 68'	Report	Williams 36'; Adelakun 90+1'	Stadium: The R Costings Abbey Stadium; Attendance: 666; Referee: Darren Deadman

6 December 2016 Round 2	Scunthorpe United	1–1 (5–3 p)	Morecambe	Scunthorpe
19:45 GMT	Mantom 3'	Report	Edwards (yellow card) 35' (goal) 53'	Stadium: Glanford Park; Attendance: 987; Referee: Darren Drysdale
	Penalties
	Morris (penalty scored); Madden (penalty scored) van Veen (penalty scored); Mantom (penalty scored); Williams (penalty scored)		Murphy (penalty missed); Rose (penalty scored); Molyneux (penalty scored); Mullin (penalty scored)

10 January 2017 Third round	Oxford United	4–1	Scunthorpe United	Oxford
19:45 GMT	Johnson 19'; Hemmings 23', 50' (pen.), 90+3'; Skarz (yellow card) 43'	Report	Williams 11' (pen.); Clarke (yellow card) 36'; Sutton (yellow card) 49'	Stadium: The Kassam Stadium; Attendance: 1,383; Referee: Gavin Ward

== Squad ==
No.	Name	Pos.	Nat.	Place of Birth	Age	Apps	Goals	Signed from	Date Signed	Fee	Contract
Goalkeepers
1	Luke Daniels	GK	(England)	Bolton	38	109	0	West Bromwich Albion	22 January 2015	Undisclosed	2017
13	Joe Anyon	GK	(England)	Lytham St Annes	39	19	0	Shrewsbury Town	25 January 2015	Free	2017
Defenders
2	Scott Wiseman	RB	(Gibraltar) (England)	Kingston upon Hull	41	53	2	Preston North End	1 July 2015	Free	2017
3	Scott Laird	LB	(England)	Taunton	38	39	2	Preston North End	10 June 2015	Free	2017
5	Murray Wallace	CB	(Scotland)	Glasgow	33	86	3	Huddersfield Town	2 January 2016	Free	2019
6	David Mirfin	CB	(England)	Sheffield	41	254	11	Watford	31 July 2012	Free	2017
15	Harry Toffolo	LB	(England)	Welwyn Garden City	31	24	2	Norwich City	31 August 2016	Loan	2017
20	Charlie Goode	CB	(England)	Watford	31	40	2	Hendon	10 June 2015	Free	2017
22	Conor Townsend	LB	(England)	Hessle	33	54	1	Hull City	6 January 2016	Free	2018
33	Jordan Clarke	RB	(England)	Coventry	34	87	3	Coventry City	10 January 2015	Undisclosed	2017
Midfielders
8	Stephen Dawson	LM	(Republic of Ireland)	Dublin	40	70	1	Rochdale	1 July 2015	Free	2017
11	Josh Morris	LM	(England)	Preston	35	47	20	Bradford City	1 July 2016	Free	2019
12	Neal Bishop	CM	(England)	Stockton-on-Tees	45	132	10	Blackpool	19 June 2014	Free	2017
16	Hakeeb Adelakun	LW	(England)	Hackney	30	120	14	Academy	1 July 2012	Trainee	2018
17	Sam Mantom	CM	(England)	Stourbridge	34	30	2	Walsall	1 July 2016	Free	2019
19	Duane Holmes	LM	(United States)	Columbus	32	36	3	Huddersfield Town	7 July 2016	Free	2018
26	Jamie Ness	CM	(Scotland)	Irvine	35	44	0	Stoke City	10 July 2015	Free	2017
30	Matt Crooks	DM	(England)	Leeds	32	12	3	Rangers	12 January 2017	Loan	2017
Forwards
7	Luke Williams	SS	(England)	Middlesbrough	33	49	8	Middlesbrough	2 July 2015	Undisclosed	2018
9	Paddy Madden	CF	(Republic of Ireland)	Dublin	36	164	56	Yeovil Town	10 January 2014	£300,000	2018
10	Kevin van Veen	CF/RW	(Netherlands)	Eindhoven	35	84	15	FC Oss	30 January 2015	Undisclosed	2018
14	Tom Hopper	CF	(England)	Boston	32	94	18	Leicester City	26 June 2015	Free	2017
21	Jonny Margetts	CF	(England)	Doncaster	33	4	1	Lincoln City	31 August 2016	Undisclosed	Undisclosed
24	Ivan Toney	CF	(England)	Northampton	30	14	6	Newcastle United	12 January 2017	Loan	2017
28	Craig Davies	CF	(Wales) (England)	Burton upon Trent	40	17	0	Wigan Athletic	7 January 2017	Undisclosed	2017
On Loan
29	Kyle Wootton	CF	(England)	Epworth	30	41	5	Academy	1 August 2014	Trainee	2017

=== Statistics ===
As of 31 March 2017

No.	Pos	Nat	Player	Total		League One		FA Cup		EFL Cup		EFL Trophy	
No.	Pos	Nat	Player	Apps	Goals	Apps	Goals	Apps	Goals	Apps	Goals	Apps	Goals
1	GK	(England) ENG	Luke Daniels	42	0	39+0	0	1+0	0	2+0	0	0+0	0
2	DF	(Gibraltar) GIB	Scott Wiseman	24	2	16+7	2	1+0	0	0+0	0	0+0	0
5	DF	(Scotland) SCO	Murray Wallace	51	1	44+0	0	1+0	0	2+0	0	4+0	1
6	DF	(England) ENG	David Mirfin	33	2	31+1	2	0+0	0	1+0	0	0+0	0
7	FW	(England) ENG	Luke Williams	11	1	1+6	0	0+1	0	1+0	0	2+0	1
8	MF	(Republic of Ireland) IRL	Stephen Dawson	46	1	40+2	1	1+0	0	2+0	0	1+0	0
9	FW	(Republic of Ireland) IRL	Paddy Madden	36	11	26+6	11	1+0	0	0+0	0	3+0	0
10	FW	(Netherlands) NED	Kevin van Veen	39	11	24+8	9	1+0	0	2+0	2	2+2	0
11	MF	(England) ENG	Josh Morris	47	20	42+0	19	1+0	0	1+1	1	1+1	0
12	MF	(England) ENG	Neal Bishop	42	4	34+6	4	0+0	0	1+0	0	0+1	0
13	GK	(England) ENG	Joe Anyon	9	0	4+1	0	0+0	0	0+0	0	4+0	0
14	FW	(England) ENG	Tom Hopper	35	6	21+9	5	0+1	1	1+0	0	3+0	0
15	DF	(England) ENG	Harry Toffolo	21	1	20+1	1	0+0	0	0+0	0	0+0	0
16	MF	(England) ENG	Hakeeb Adelakun	22	3	7+9	1	0+0	0	1+1	0	3+1	2
17	MF	(England) ENG	Sam Mantom	30	1	9+15	1	0+1	0	0+1	0	4+0	0
18	MF	(England) ENG	Richard Smallwood	19	1	6+10	1	1+0	0	0+0	0	1+1	0
19	MF	(United States) USA	Duane Holmes	37	3	28+4	3	1+0	0	1+1	0	2+0	0
20	DF	(England) ENG	Charlie Goode	26	0	13+7	0	1+0	0	1+0	0	4+0	0
21	FW	(England) ENG	Jonny Margetts	4	1	0+2	0	0+0	0	0+0	0	0+2	1
22	DF	(England) ENG	Conor Townsend	28	0	22+0	0	1+0	0	2+0	0	3+0	0
24	FW	(England) ENG	Ivan Toney	14	6	8+6	6	0+0	0	0+0	0	0+0	0
26	MF	(Scotland) SCO	Jamie Ness	14	0	8+3	0	0+0	0	1+0	0	2+0	0
28	FW	(Wales) WAL	Craig Davies	17	0	3+14	0	0+0	0	0+0	0	0+0	0
30	MF	(England) ENG	Matt Crooks	12	3	8+4	3	0+0	0	0+0	0	0+0	0
31	MF	(England) ENG	Levi Sutton	9	0	6+1	0	0+0	0	0+0	0	1+1	0
33	DF	(England) ENG	Jordan Clarke	24	1	19+0	1	0+0	0	2+0	0	3+0	0
34	DF	(England) ENG	Lewis Butroid	1	0	0+0	0	0+0	0	0+0	0	1+0	0
Player(s) currently out on loan:
3	DF	(England) ENG	Scott Laird	1	0	0+1	0	0+0	0	0+0	0	0+0	0
29	FW	(England) ENG	Kyle Wootton	5	1	0+2	1	0+0	0	1+1	0	0+1	0

=== Goals record ===
As of 17 April 2017

Rank	No.	Nat.	Po.	Name	League One	FA Cup	EFL Cup	EFL Trophy	Total
1	11	(England)	LM	Josh Morris	19	0	1	0	20
2	9	(Republic of Ireland)	CF	Paddy Madden	11	0	0	0	11
2	10	(Netherlands)	CF	Kevin van Veen	9	0	2	0	11
4	14	(England)	CF	Tom Hopper	5	1	0	0	6
4	24	(England)	CF	Ivan Toney	6	0	0	0	6
6	12	(England)	CM	Neal Bishop	4	0	0	0	4
7	16	(England)	LW	Hakeeb Adelakun	1	0	0	2	3
7	19	(United States)	CM	Duane Holmes	3	0	0	0	3
7	30	(England)	DM	Matt Crooks	3	0	0	0	3
10	2	(Gibraltar)	RB	Scott Wiseman	2	0	0	0	2
10	5	(Scotland)	CB	Murray Wallace	1	0	0	1	2
10	6	(England)	CB	David Mirfin	2	0	0	0	2
10	15	(England)	LB	Harry Toffolo	2	0	0	0	2
10	17	(England)	CM	Sam Mantom	1	0	0	1	2
15	7	(England)	SS	Luke Williams	0	0	0	1	1
15	8	(England)	LM	Stephen Dawson	1	0	0	0	1
15	~~18~~	(England)	CM	Richard Smallwood	1	0	0	0	1
15	21	(England)	CF	Jonny Margetts	0	0	0	1	1
15	29	(England)	CF	Kyle Wootton	1	0	0	0	1
15	33	(England)	RB	Jordan Clarke	1	0	0	0	1
15	Own Goals				2	0	0	1	3
Total					74	1	3	7	85

=== Disciplinary record ===
As of 31 March 2017

Rank	No.	Nat.	Po.	Name	League One			FA Cup			EFL Cup			EFL Trophy			Total		
Rank	No.	Nat.	Po.	Name	Yellow card	(yellow card) (yellow-red card)	Red card	Yellow card	(yellow card) (yellow-red card)	Red card	Yellow card	(yellow card) (yellow-red card)	Red card	Yellow card	(yellow card) (yellow-red card)	Red card	Yellow card	(yellow card) (yellow-red card)	Red card
1	10	(Netherlands)	CF	Kevin van Veen	10	0	0	1	0	0	1	0	0	0	0	0	12	0	0
2	12	(England)	CM	Neal Bishop	9	0	1	0	0	0	0	0	0	0	0	0	9	0	1
3	8	(Republic of Ireland)	LM	Stephen Dawson	8	0	0	0	0	0	1	0	0	0	0	0	9	0	0
4	5	(Scotland)	CB	Murray Wallace	7	0	0	0	0	0	0	0	0	0	0	0	7	0	0
4	33	(England)	RB	Jordan Clarke	6	1	0	0	0	0	0	0	0	0	0	0	6	1	0
6	6	(England)	CB	David Mirfin	4	0	0	0	0	0	0	0	0	0	0	0	4	0	0
6	9	(Republic of Ireland)	CF	Paddy Madden	4	0	0	0	0	0	0	0	0	0	0	0	4	0	0
6	15	(England)	LB	Harry Toffolo	3	1	0	0	0	0	0	0	0	0	0	0	3	1	0
6	19	(United States)	LM	Duane Holmes	4	0	0	0	0	0	0	0	0	0	0	0	4	0	0
10	11	(England)	LM	Josh Morris	3	0	0	0	0	0	0	0	0	0	0	0	3	0	0
10	22	(England)	LB	Conor Townsend	2	0	0	1	0	0	0	0	0	0	0	0	3	0	0
12	17	(England)	CM	Sam Mantom	2	0	0	0	0	0	0	0	0	0	0	0	2	0	0
12	20	(England)	CB	Charlie Goode	2	0	0	0	0	0	0	0	0	0	0	0	2	0	0
12	24	(England)	CF	Ivan Toney	2	0	0	0	0	0	0	0	0	0	0	0	2	0	0
12	31	(England)	RM	Levi Sutton	2	0	0	0	0	0	0	0	0	0	0	0	2	0	0
16	2	(Gibraltar)	RB	Scott Wiseman	1	0	0	0	0	0	0	0	0	0	0	0	1	0	0
16	7	(England)	SS	Luke Williams	0	0	0	1	0	0	0	0	0	0	0	0	1	0	0
16	26	(Scotland)	CM	Jamie Ness	1	0	0	0	0	0	0	0	0	0	0	0	1	0	0
16	30	(England)	DM	Matt Crooks	1	0	0	0	0	0	0	0	0	0	0	0	1	0	0
Total					70	2	1	3	0	0	2	0	0	0	0	0	75	2	1

== Transfers ==
=== Transfers in ===
Date from	Position	Nationality	Name	From	Fee	Ref.
1 July 2016	CM	(England)	Sam Mantom	Walsall	Free transfer	
1 July 2016	LM	(England)	Josh Morris	Bradford City	Free transfer	
6 July 2016	CM	(United States)	Duane Holmes	Huddersfield Town	Free transfer	
31 August 2016	CF	(England)	Jonny Margetts	Lincoln City	Undisclosed	
7 January 2017	CF	(Wales)	Craig Davies	Wigan Athletic	Undisclosed	
31 January 2017	GK	(England)	Rory Watson	Hull City	Free transfer	

=== Transfers out ===
Date from	Position	Nationality	Name	To	Fee	Ref.
1 July 2016	CB	(England)	Andrew Boyce	Grimsby Town (Note: Following Boyce's release, he signed for Grimsby Town.)	Released	
1 July 2016	CB	(Republic of Ireland)	Niall Canavan	Rochdale (Note: Following Canavan's release, he signed for Rochdale.)	Released	
1 July 2016	CM	(England)	Sean McAllister	Grimsby Town (Note: Following McAllister's release, he signed for Grimsby Town.)	Released	
1 July 2016	LW	(England)	Gary McSheffrey	Doncaster Rovers (Note: Following McSheffrey's release, he signed for Doncaster Rovers.)	Released	
31 January 2017	DM	(England)	Jack King	Stevenage	Free transfer	

=== Loans in ===
Date from	Position	Nationality	Name	From	Date until	Ref.
31 August 2016	LB	(England)	Harry Toffolo	Norwich City	3 January 2017	
31 August 2016	CM	(England)	Richard Smallwood	Rotherham United	3 January 2017	
7 January 2017	LB	(England)	Harry Toffolo	Norwich City	End of Season	
12 January 2017	DM	(England)	Matt Crooks	Rangers	End of Season	
12 January 2017	CF	(England)	Ivan Toney	Newcastle United	End of Season	

=== Loans out ===
Date from	Position	Nationality	Name	To	Date until	Ref.
1 July 2016	AM	(England)	Dominic Vose	Grimsby Town	End of Season	
30 August 2016	DM	(England)	Jack King	Stevenage	3 January 2017	
31 August 2016	LB	(England)	Scott Laird	Walsall	3 January 2017	
20 September 2016	CF	(England)	Noel Burdett	Frickley Athletic	1 December 2016	
30 September 2016	CF	(England)	Kyle Wootton	North Ferriby United	24 January 2017	
25 November 2016	MF	(England)	Levi Sutton	North Ferriby United	23 December 2016	
2 December 2016	CF	(England)	Noel Burdett	Gainsborough Trinity	End of Season	
12 January 2017	LB	(England)	Scott Laird	Walsall	End of Season	
25 January 2017	CF	(England)	Kyle Wootton	Cheltenham Town	End of Season	
27 January 2017	SS	(England)	Luke Williams	Northampton Town	End of Season	
31 January 2017	CF	(England)	Jonny Margetts	Crewe Alexandra	3 February 2017	(Note: On 3 February 2017, Jonny Margetts' loan was terminated due to FIFA's rules and regulations.)
31 January 2017	GK	(England)	Rory Watson	North Ferriby United	End of Season	
