= Dan Martin (footballer, born 1986) =

English footballer

Personal information
- Full name: Daniel Ashley Martin
- Date of birth: 24 September 1986 (age 40)
- Place of birth: Derby, England
- Position: Defender

Youth career
- Derby County

Senior career*
Years	Team	Apps	(Gls)
2004–2005	Derby County	0	(0)
2005–2007	Notts County	51	(8)
2007–2008	Mansfield Town	26	(0)
2008	Tamworth	0	(0)
2008–2012	Mickleover Sports		
2012	Coalville Town		(Stockbrook Colts Bobcats. Shield Winners 2024/25)
–2015	Mickleover Royals		
2015–2016	Rocester		

International career^{‡}
2001–2002	England U16	7	(1)
2003–2004	England U17	4	(0)
- England U18
	Wales U21	10	

Managerial career
- 2016–2018: Rocester
- 2018: Heanor Town
- * Club domestic league appearances and goals as of 01:30, 28 June 2008 (UTC) ‡ National team caps and goals as of 01:30, 28 June 2008 (UTC)

Daniel Ashley Martin (born 24 September 1986) is a former professional footballer. Martin made over 75 appearances in the Football League between 2005 and 2008, and played for England and Wales at youth level.

== Career ==
Martin began his career as a trainee with Derby County in July 2002, having graduated from Derby's academy and captained Derby's Under-18 team to the quarter-finals of FA Youth Cup. He joined Notts County on a free transfer in July 2005, where he made 51 appearances, scoring eight goals, in two seasons. Martin was one of six players released by manager Steve Thompson at the end of the 2006–07 season, after which he signed for fellow League Two side Mansfield Town in June 2007. Martin was released by Mansfield at the end of the 2007–08 season after the club were relegated to the Football Conference, and joined Tamworth in June 2008 but left the club shortly afterwards. Martin then signed for Northern Counties East Football League Premier Division side Mickleover Sports and helped them do back-to-back promotions into the Northern Premier League Premier Division. He spent three seasons at Mickleover Sports before joining newly promoted Northern Premier League Division One South side Coalville Town in January 2012.

After joining Rocester as a player in 2015, Martin was appointed interim manager in 2016, before becoming the club's permanent manager. He left the club at the end of the 2017–18 season. In May 2018 Martin was appointed manager of Heanor Town. However, he resigned from the post in September that year.
