= Rothwell Town F.C. =

English football club

Coordinates: 52°25′32.84″N 0°48′04.62″W

Rothwell Town
- Full name: Rothwell Town Football Club
- Nickname: The Bones
- Founded: 1894 (as Rothwell Town Swifts)
- Dissolved: 2012
- Ground: Cecil Street, Rothwell
- Capacity: 3,500 (264 steated)
- 2011–12: United Counties League; Division One, 17th
Home colours	Away colours

Rothwell Town F.C. was a football club based in Rothwell in the north of Northamptonshire. They were founding members of the Northamptonshire League in 1895, and played in the United Counties League Division One until 2011–12.

== History ==
The club was formed as Rothwell Town Swifts in 1895 and was a founder member of the Northamptonshire League. The club's nickname, the Bones, derived from the bone crypt in the town's Holy Trinity Church, one of only two medieval ossuaries in the country; the other being at St Leonards, Hythe, Kent.

Although financial difficulties led to the club switching between senior and junior football on several occasions, they did manage to achieve several runners-up positions during their stay in the Northamptonshire League. In 1933 the club dropped down to the Kettering League, which they won in 1937. In 1948 they returned to senior football, spending two seasons in the Leicestershire Senior League before becoming founder members of the United Counties League in 1950.

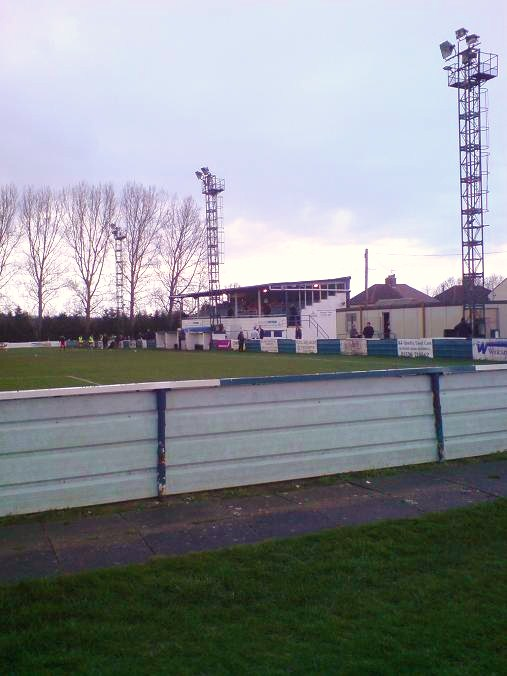
The club's home stadium

During their time in the United Counties League Rothwell achieved five runners-up finishes and finally claimed the league title in 1992–1993, a feat which they repeated the following year. Following their second title win, the club stepped up to the Southern League. In 1997 Rothwell finished second in the Midland Division and were promoted to the Premier Division, where they spent three seasons. After their relegation from the Premier Division in 2000 they played in the Eastern Division, the Western Division, and from 2006 the newly formed Division One Midlands.

The club appointed former Corby Town manager Rob Dunion as their new manager in June 2008.

Season 2009–2010 saw Rothwell struggle both on and off the pitch. In the league they finished in the bottom four and a financial crisis kicked in with the club's main stream of revenue - the social club - becoming unavailable for public use. In the summer of 2010 Rothwell resigned from the Southern League and applied to rejoin the United Counties League in which they were successful, being placed in Division One. Rob Dunion left as manager and former Rothwell favourite Dave Williams took over once again as manager.

The club folded at the end of the 2011–12 season.

== Local rivalries ==
Local rivals included: Kettering Town (Conference National), Corby Town (Conference North), Desborough Town and Rothwell Corinthians (both United Counties League).

== Honours ==
- United Counties League
  - Premier Division Champions: 1992–93, 1993–94
  - Division One Winners: 1899–1900
  - Division Two Champions: 1952–53, 1953–54
  - Knockout Cup Winners: 1991–92, 1992–93
  - Division One Knockout Cup Winners: 1955–56, 1970–71, 1971–72
  - Division Two Knockout Cup Winners: 1952–53, 1953–54
  - Benevolent Cup Winners: 1992–93, 1993–94
- United League Champions: 1900–01
- Northamptonshire Senior Cup Winners: 1899–1900, 1923–24, 1956–60, 1988–89, 1995–96, 2001–02, 2002–03
- Northamptonshire Maunsell Cup Winners: 2003

== Records ==
- Best league performance: 16th in Southern League Premier Division, 1997–98
- Best FA Cup performance: 4th qualifying round, 1999–2000
- Best FA Trophy performance: 3rd round, 1999–2000
- Best FA Vase performance: 5th round, 1992–93

== Former players ==
1. Players that have played/managed in the Football League or any foreign equivalent to this level (i.e. fully professional league).
2. Players with full international caps.
3. Players that hold a club record or have captained the club.

- (England) Paul Birch
- (England) Ricky Miller
