= 2011–12 United Counties League =

The 2011–12 United Counties League season (known as the 2011–12 ChromaSport & Trophies United Counties League for sponsorship reasons) was the 105th in the history of the United Counties League, a football competition in England.

== Premier Division ==
United Counties League Premier Division
- Season: 2011–12
- Champions: Long Buckby
- Promoted: King's Lynn Town
- Relegated: Thrapston Town
- Matches: 420
- Goals: 1,534 (3.65 per match)

The Premier Division featured 18 clubs which competed in the division last season, along with three new clubs:

- Kempston Rovers, promoted from Division One
- Spalding United, relegated from the Northern Premier League
- Thrapston Town, promoted from Division One

=== League table ===
Pos	Team	Pld	W	D	L	GF	GA	GD	Pts	Promotion or relegation
1	Long Buckby	40	35	3	2	130	26	+104	108 (Note: Long Buckby did not apply for promotion.)	
2	King's Lynn Town	40	34	4	2	122	32	+90	106	Promoted to the Northern Premier League Division One South
3	St Ives Town	40	28	4	8	107	51	+56	88	
4	Deeping Rangers	40	24	8	8	102	59	+43	80	
5	Newport Pagnell Town	40	24	4	12	99	51	+48	73 (Note: Newport Pagnell Town, Boston Town & Northampton Spencer were deducted three points.)	
6	Holbeach United	40	23	4	13	89	52	+37	73	
7	Peterborough Northern Star	40	21	4	15	87	59	+28	67	
8	Wellingborough Town	40	17	8	15	79	72	+7	59	
9	Stewarts & Lloyds Corby	40	17	6	17	78	64	+14	57	
10	Kempston Rovers	40	16	9	15	72	72	0	57	
11	Blackstones	40	16	7	17	60	72	−12	55	
12	Cogenhoe United	40	15	6	19	58	79	−21	51	
13	Spalding United	40	13	11	16	69	79	−10	50	
14	Boston Town	40	13	9	18	55	66	−11	45	
15	Daventry United	40	11	10	19	64	87	−23	43	Club folded
16	Desborough Town	40	8	10	22	50	95	−45	34	
17	Northampton Spencer	40	9	9	22	48	97	−49	33	Demoted to Division One
18	Yaxley	40	8	5	27	41	85	−44	29	
19	Sleaford Town	40	7	7	26	45	103	−58	28	
20	Irchester United	40	6	7	27	42	115	−73	24 (Note: Irchester United were deducted one point.)	
21	Thrapston Town	40	4	7	29	37	118	−81	19	Relegated to Division One

Source: fchd
Rules for classification: 1) points; 2) goal difference; 3) number of goals scored.

== Division One ==
United Counties League Division One
- Season: 2011–12
- Champions: Huntingdon Town
- Promoted: Huntingdon Town; Harborough Town
- Matches: 272
- Goals: 993 (3.65 per match)

Division One featured 15 clubs which competed in the division last season, along with two new clubs, relegated from the Premier Division:

- Raunds Town
- Rothwell Corinthians

=== League table ===
Pos	Team	Pld	W	D	L	GF	GA	GD	Pts	Promotion
1	Huntingdon Town	32	24	2	6	101	27	+74	74	Promoted to the Premier Division
2	Harborough Town	32	22	6	4	78	31	+47	72	Promoted to the Premier Division
3	Bugbrooke St Michaels	32	20	4	8	82	37	+45	64	
4	Wellingborough Whitworth	32	19	6	7	77	49	+28	63	
5	Rushden & Higham United	32	16	5	11	61	56	+5	53	
6	Eynesbury Rovers	32	16	4	12	71	53	+18	52	
7	Olney Town	32	15	7	10	70	54	+16	52	
8	Rothwell Corinthians	32	15	6	11	54	55	−1	51	
9	Burton Park Wanderers	32	12	9	11	64	58	+6	45	
10	Wootton Blue Cross	32	11	9	12	41	57	−16	42	
11	Buckingham Town	32	10	10	12	57	64	−7	40	
12	Northampton ON Chenecks	32	11	5	16	44	66	−22	38	
13	Raunds Town	32	8	7	17	38	62	−24	31	
14	Bourne Town	32	6	9	17	38	66	−28	27	
15	Potton United	32	8	5	19	46	71	−25	26 (Note: Potton United were deducted three points.)	
16	Northampton Sileby Rangers	32	5	3	24	45	76	−31	18	
17	Rothwell Town	32	4	3	25	26	111	−85	5 (Note: Rothwell Town were deducted ten points.)	Club folded

Source: fchd
Rules for classification: 1) points; 2) goal difference; 3) number of goals scored.
