= King's Lynn Town F.C. =

English football club

Coordinates: 52.75003°N 0.40737°E

King's Lynn Town
- Full name: King's Lynn Town Football Club
- Nickname: The Linnets
- Founded: 2010
- Ground: The Walks, King's Lynn
- Capacity: 8,200 (1,200 seated)
- CEO: Bal Srai
- Manager: Paul Caddis
- League: National League North
- 2025–26: National League North, 19th of 24
- Website: kltown.co.uk
Home colours	Away colours

King's Lynn Town Football Club is a football club based in King's Lynn, Norfolk, England. Nicknamed 'The Linnets', they are currently members of the National League North and play at the Walks. They were founded in 2010 as a phoenix club of King's Lynn F.C., which were wound up a year earlier.

== History ==
The club was established in 2010 after King's Lynn F.C. were wound up in 2009. They were admitted to the Premier Division of the United Counties League and were runners-up in their first season in the league, also reaching the semi-finals of the FA Vase, where they lost 6–2 on aggregate to Coalville Town. After finishing as runners-up again in 2011–12 the club were promoted to Division One South of the Northern Premier League. They won Division One South at the first attempt, earning promotion to the Premier Division. In 2015 the club were transferred to the Premier Division of the Southern League. In 2016–17 they won the Norfolk Senior Cup, beating Fakenham Town 2–0 in the final. The club were runners-up in the Southern League Premier Division in 2017–18, qualifying for the promotion play-offs. After beating Weymouth 3–0 in the semi-finals, they lost 2–1 to Slough Town in the final. The club were placed in the Premier Division Central for the 2018–19 season, going on to finish as runners-up and qualifying for the play-offs. After defeating Stratford Town and Alvechurch, they were promoted to the National League North following a 3–2 win against Warrington Town in the super play-off final.

The 2019–20 season was abandoned due to the coronavirus pandemic with the club second in the league, two points behind leaders York City with two games in hand. The National League later decided the final league table would be based on points-per-game, resulting in King's Lynn being declared champions, earning promotion to the National League. In 2020–21 the club reached the first round of the FA Cup for the first time after Notts County were forced to cede their fourth qualifying round tie due to a COVID outbreak in their squad; King's Lynn went on to defeat League Two club Port Vale 1–0 at Vale Park in the first round, before losing 6–1 at Portsmouth in the second.

Another FA Cup first round appearance in 2021–22 ended in a 1–0 home defeat by Walsall, while the league season ended with King's Lynn being relegated from the National League back to the National League North. In 2022–23 they reached the FA Cup first round again, winning 1–0 at Doncaster Rovers to progress to the second round where they lost 3–0 to Stevenage. They went on to finish as runners-up in the National League North, but lost 4–1 to Kidderminster Harriers in the play-off semi-finals. In 2024–25 the club finished sixth in the division, before losing 1–0 to Chorley in the play-off quarter-finals.

== Current squad ==
As of 17 August 2026

Note: Flags indicate national team as defined under FIFA eligibility rules; some limited exceptions apply. Players may hold more than one non-FIFA nationality.

No.	Pos.	Nation	Player
1	GK	WAL	Ronnie Hollingshead
2	DF	ENG	Reece Hall-Johnson
4	DF	ENG	Rhys Doherty
5	DF	ENG	Zak Mills
7	MF	ENG	Michael Clunan (captain)
8	MF	ENG	Harley Hamilton
9	FW	IRL	Carlton Ubaezuonu
10	MF	ENG	Ross Crane
11	MF	ENG	Josh McCammon
12	DF	ENG	Tom Dickens
14	MF	ENG	Tom Scott

No.	Pos.	Nation	Player
15	DF	ENG	Ethan Warne
17	DF	ENG	Aaron Jones
19	FW	ENG	Jesse Nwabueze
20	MF	ENG	Noah Rubio
21	FW	IRL	Adam Rooney (player-coach)
23	MF	ENG	Ed Leach (on loan from AFC Wimbledon)
24	MF	ENG	Ryan Tunnicliffe
31	GK	ENG	Oscar Thomas
33	DF	ENG	Jahmari Lindsay
39	FW	SKN	Kwame Thomas

== Reserve team ==
The club's reserve team joined the Reserve Division Two of the United Counties League in 2010, going on to win the division in their first season and earn promotion to Reserve Division One. After winning Reserve Division One the following season and the first team leaving the United Counties League, the reserves joined Division One of the Peterborough & District League in 2012. They secured a third successive title, earning promotion to the Premier Division. After winning the Premier Division the following season, the reserves joined Division One of the Eastern Counties League. They won the Division One Cup in 2016–17, beating Wisbech St Mary 1–0 in the final. The team was withdrawn from the Eastern Counties League at the end of the 2020–21 season.

== Ground ==
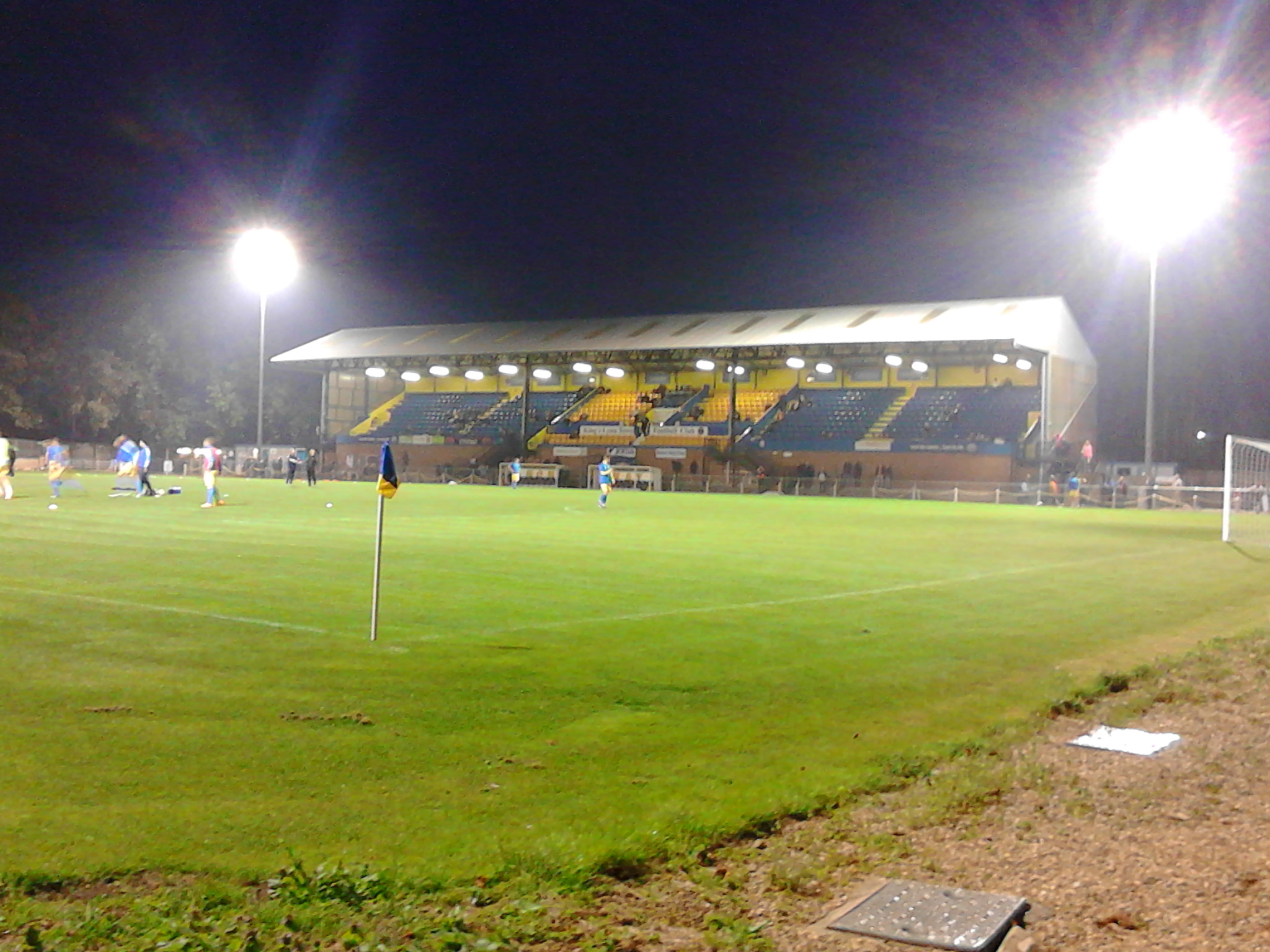
The Walks

The club took over the Walks ground from King's Lynn, who had played there since being formed in 1881. Canvas screens were erected around the ground in 1892 to prevent people watching matches without paying. In 1893 a match was played against Wisbech Town under electric lights. A stand was built in 1896, although it was demolished in 1905, replaced by a 500-seat wooden grandstand built at a cost of £250. In the mid-1950s the Supporters Club installed terracing for 4,000 and 780 seats on the northern side of the pitch. In 1955 the wooden stand was sold to a company in Spalding and a new grandstand seating 1,400 with a terraced paddock holding 3,000 was built at a cost of £27,000 and opened by then FIFA President and FA Chairman Arthur Drewry on 18 August 1956.

Floodlights were installed in 1963 and used for the first time in a Culey Festival Cup match against Cambridge City on 25 September.

== Honours ==
- National League
  - National League North champions 2019–20
- Northern Premier League
  - Division One South champions 2012–13
- Norfolk Senior Cup
  - Winners 2016–17

== Records ==
- Best FA Cup performance: Second round, 2020–21, 2022–23
- Best FA Trophy performance: Third round, 2012–13
- Best FA Vase performance: Semi-finals, 2010–11
- Biggest victory: 10–1 vs Raunds Town, United Counties League Premier Division, 1 January 2011

== See also ==
- King's Lynn Town F.C. players
- King's Lynn Town F.C. managers
