= 2014–15 Scunthorpe United F.C. season =

Scunthorpe United F.C.
2014–15 season
- Chairman: Peter Swann
- Manager: Russ Wilcox (until 8 October); Andy Dawson (caretaker, between 8–13 October); Mark Robins (from 13 October)
- Stadium: Glanford Park
- League One: 16th
- FA Cup: Third round (eliminated by Chesterfield
- League Cup: Second round (eliminated by Reading)
- Football League Trophy: Second round (eliminated by Notts County)
- Top goalscorer: League: Paddy Madden (2); All: Paddy Madden (2)
- Highest home attendance: 4,013 vs Preston North End
- Lowest home attendance: 2,004 vs Chesterfield
- Average home league attendance: 2,909
Home colours	Away colours	Third colours

The 2014–15 season was Scunthorpe United's 116th season in their existence and their first season back in League One, following promotion the previous season. Along with competing in League One, the club also participated in the FA Cup, League Cup and Football League Trophy. The season covered the period from 1 July 2014 to 30 June 2015.

== Match details ==
=== Pre-season ===
16 July 2014	Bottesford Town	1–3	Scunthorpe United	Scunthorpe
19:00 BST	Johnson 59'	Report	Winnall 8'; Madden 50', 89'	Stadium: Birch Park

19 July 2014	Gainsborough Trinity	1–2	Scunthorpe United	Gainsborough
15:00 BST	Beesley 57'	Report	Madden 24'; Burton 44'	Stadium: The Northolme

23 July 2014	Carlton Town	1–5	Scunthorpe United	Carlton
19:00 BST	Brothwell 49'	Report	Bateson 30'; Howe 47'; Syers 52', 87' (pen.); Mosanya 90'	Stadium: Bill Stokeld Stadium

26 July 2014	Scunthorpe United	1–0	Huddersfield Town	Scunthorpe
15:00 BST	Madden 59'	Report		Stadium: Glanford Park

29 July 2014	Frickley Athletic	0–1	Scunthorpe United	South Elmsall
19:00 BST		Report	Burton 58'	Stadium: Westfield Lane

=== League One ===
==== League table ====
Pos	Team	Pld	W	D	L	GF	GA	GD	Pts
14	Walsall	46	14	17	15	50	54	−4	59
15	Oldham Athletic	46	14	15	17	54	67	−13	57
16	Scunthorpe United	46	14	14	18	62	75	−13	56
17	Coventry City	46	13	16	17	49	60	−11	55
18	Port Vale	46	15	9	22	55	65	−10	54

Updated to match(es) played on 3 May 2015. Source: BBC Sport
Rules for classification: 1) Points; 2) Goal difference; 3) Number of goals scored

==== Matches ====
9 August 2014 1	Swindon Town	3–1	Scunthorpe United	Swindon
15:00	Luongo 3'; Smith 12', 45'	Report	20' Madden; (red card) 79' Williams	Stadium: County Ground; Attendance: 7,060; Referee: Stuart Attwell

16 August 2014 2	Scunthorpe United	0–4	Preston North End	Scunthorpe
15:00			Joe Garner 17'; Miguel Llera 39' (o.g.); Chris Humphrey 48'; Joe Garner 82'	Stadium: Glanford Park; Attendance: 4,013; Referee: Andy Madley

19 August 2014 3	Scunthorpe United	0–2	Fleetwood Town	Scunthorpe
19:45		Report	70' Proctor; 80' Evans	Stadium: Glanford Park; Attendance: 2,774; Referee: Andy Woolmer

23 August 2014 4	Yeovil Town	1–1	Scunthorpe United	Yeovil
15:00	Moore 65'	Report	82' Madden	Stadium: Huish Park; Attendance: 3,943; Referee: Keith Hill

30 August 2014 5	Scunthorpe United	2–1	Walsall	Scunthorpe
15:00	Adelakun 51'; McSheffrey 54'	Report	70' Bradshaw	Stadium: Glanford Park; Attendance: 3,098; Referee: Andy Davies

6 September 2014 6	Bristol City	2–0	Scunthorpe United	Bristol
15:00	Aden Flint 52'; Cunningham 83'	Report		Stadium: Ashton Gate; Attendance: 12,007; Referee: Charles Breakspear

13 September 2014 7	Chesterfield	4–1	Scunthorpe United	Chesterfield
15:00	Doyle 55', 64', 72' (pen.); Morsy 88'	Report	Madden 46'	Stadium: Proact Stadium; Attendance: 6,227 (621 away); Referee: Graham Salisbury

16 September 2014 8	Scunthorpe United	2–1	Coventry City	Scunthorpe
19:45	Madden 38'; Taylor 62'	Report	Nouble 17'; Johnson (red card) 24'	Stadium: Glanford Park; Attendance: 2,866 (379 away fans); Referee: Mark Haywood

20 September 2014 9	Scunthorpe United	1–2	Leyton Orient	Scunthorpe
15:00	Sparrow 49'; Llera (yellow card) 90'; McSheffrey (yellow card) 90+5'		Cuthbert 3'; McAnuff 51'; James (yellow card) 75'	Stadium: Glanford Park; Attendance: 3,264; Referee: Eddie Ilderton

27 September 2014 10	Oldham Athletic	3–2	Scunthorpe United	Oldham
15:00	Forte 29'; Philliskirk 66', 83'; Kusunga (yellow card) 88'	Report	Boyce 26' (yellow card) 61'; Fallon 34'; O'Neill (yellow card) 69'; Williams (yellow card) 77'	Stadium: Boundary Park; Attendance: 3,837 (310 away); Referee: Richard Clark

4 October 2014 11	Scunthorpe United	1–2	Doncaster Rovers	Scunthorpe
15:00	Sparrow (yellow card) 7'; Fallon 24'; O'Neill (yellow card) 51'; Bishop (yellow card) 65'	Report	Coppinger 29'; Tyson 49' (yellow card) 50'; Furman (yellow card) 71'	Stadium: Glanford Park; Attendance: 5,420 (1,728 away); Referee: Seb Stockbridge

11 October 2014 12	Gillingham	0–3	Scunthorpe United	Gillingham
15:00	Loft (red card) 34'; Myrie-Williams (yellow card) 60'	Report	Madden 41'; Brisley (yellow card) 50'; Norris (yellow card) 60'; Bishop 72'; Boyce (yellow card) 82'; McSheffrey 90+4'	Stadium: Priestfield Stadium; Attendance: 7,042; Referee: Peter Bankes

18 October 2014 13	Scunthorpe United	1–1	Colchester United	Scunthorpe
15:00	Fallon 20'	Report	Sears 33'	Stadium: Glanford Park; Attendance: 3,303; Referee: David Coote

21 October 2014 14	Port Vale	2–2	Scunthorpe United	Burslem
19:45	Williamson 7'; Birchall 70'	Report	Bishop 4'; Myrie-Williams (yellow card) 51' (yellow-red card) 73'; Taylor 79'	Stadium: Vale Park; Attendance: 3,590; Referee: James Adcock

25 October 2014 15	Scunthorpe United	0–1	Notts County	Scunthorpe
15:00		Report	Ismail 89' (pen.)	Stadium: Glanford Park; Attendance: 4,008; Referee: Nigel Miller

1 November 2014 16	Peterborough United	1–2	Scunthorpe United	Peterborough
15:00	Washington 57'; Bostwick (yellow card) 90+1'	Report	Williams 14' (yellow card) 54'; Almeida Santos 64' (o.g.); McSheffrey (yellow card) 70'; Bishop (yellow card) 75'	Stadium: London Road Stadium; Attendance: 6,275; Referee: Darren Bond

22 November 2014 17	Crawley Town	2–2	Scunthorpe United	Crawley
15:00	Leacock 76'; McLeod 80' (pen.); Keane (yellow card) 82'	Report	Madden 26'; Bishop (yellow card) 44'; Taylor 55'; Williams (yellow card) 69'; Myrie-Williams (yellow card) 80'; Boyce (yellow card) 90+2'	Stadium: Broadfield Stadium; Attendance: 2,178; Referee: Simon Hooper

29 November 2014 18	Barnsley	1–2	Scunthorpe United	Barnsley
15:00	Cranie (yellow card) 21'; Berry (yellow card) 25'; Trotta 29'	Report	Madden 30', 45+2'; Llera (yellow card) 65'; Williams (yellow card) 86'	Stadium: Oakwell; Attendance: 9,340; Referee: James Linington

13 December 2014 19	Scunthorpe United	2–1	Crewe Alexandra	Scunthorpe
15:00	Williams 10'; Llera 77'	Report	Ajose 30'; Ness (yellow card) 77'; Leigh (yellow card) 90+2'	Stadium: Glanford Park; Attendance: 3,006; Referee: Darren Sheldrake

20 December 2014 20	Bradford City	1–1	Scunthorpe United	Bradford
15:00	McArdle 32'; Meredith (yellow card) 56'	Report	Williams (yellow card) 36'; Osbourne (yellow card) 61'; Adelakun 90+4'	Stadium: Valley Parade; Attendance: 12,831; Referee: Phil Gibbs

26 December 2014 21	Scunthorpe United	2–1	Rochdale	Scunthorpe
15:00	O'Neil 58'; Madden 77'; McSheffrey (yellow card) 90+3'	Report	Done 69' (yellow card) 87'	Stadium: Glanford Park; Attendance: 4,004; Referee: Tony Harrington

10 January 2015 22	Walsall	1–4	Scunthorpe United	Walsall
15:00	Taylor (yellow card) 30'; Chambers (yellow card) 37'; Cain 51'	Report	Boyce (yellow card) 12'; Chambers 24' (o.g.); Hopper 39'; Madden 63' (pen.); Bishop 65'	Stadium: Bescot Stadium; Attendance: 3,738; Referee: Lee Collins

17 January 2015 23	Scunthorpe United	0–2	Bristol City	Scunthorpe
15:00		Report	Emmanuel-Thomas 35' (pen.); Bryan (yellow card) 62'; Freeman 85'	Stadium: Glanford Park; Attendance: 3,611; Referee: Jeremy Simpson

27 January 2015 24	Scunthorpe United	1–1	Milton Keynes Dons	Scunthorpe
19:45	Clarke (yellow card) 12'; Hopper 57'; McSheffrey (yellow card) 73'; Osbourne (yellow card) 83'	Report	Grigg (yellow card) 67'; McFadzean 77'	Stadium: Glanford Park; Attendance: 3,005; Referee: Darren Bond

31 January 2015 25	Leyton Orient	1–4	Scunthorpe United	Leyton
15:00	Cox (yellow card) 59'; Henderson 68' (pen.)	Report	O'Neil 13'; McSheffrey 28'; Hopper 49', 80'; Clarke (yellow card) 67'	Stadium: Brisbane Road; Attendance: 5,184; Referee: Iain Williamson

7 February 2015 26	Scunthorpe United	0–1	Oldham Athletic	Scunthorpe
15:00		Report	Winchester 84'	Stadium: Glanford Park; Attendance: 4,125; Referee: Darren Deadman

10 February 2015 27	Coventry City	1–1	Scunthorpe United	Coventry
19:45	Martin (yellow card) 20'; Willis (yellow card) 44'; O'Brien (yellow card) 73'; Tudgay (yellow card) 81' (goal) 90+3'	Report	McSheffrey 21' (yellow card) 58'; O'Neil (yellow card) 56'	Stadium: Ricoh Arena; Attendance: 6,885; Referee: Kevin Johnson

14 February 2015 28	Scunthorpe United	3–1	Swindon Town	Scunthorpe
15:00	Williams (yellow card) 41'; Madden 62'; O'Neil (yellow card) 68'; Canavan 76' van Veen 79' (yellow card) 80'	Report	Williams (yellow card) 37'; Smith 44'; Branco (yellow card) 61'	Stadium: Glanford Park; Attendance: 3,763; Referee: Fred Graham

17 February 2015 29	Scunthorpe United	2–0	Chesterfield	Scunthorpe
19:45	Canavan 58'; Madden 87'	Report	Morsy (yellow card) 80'; O'Shea (yellow card) 90'	Stadium: Glanford Park; Attendance: 3,601; Referee: Eddie Ilderton

21 February 2015 30	Preston North End	2–0	Scunthorpe United	Preston
15:00 GMT	Johnson 57'; Gallagher 71'; Garner (yellow card) 81'	Report	McSheffrey (yellow card) 65'; Clarke (yellow card) 73'	Stadium: Deepdale; Attendance: 9,415; Referee: Kevin Wright

24 February 2015 31	Scunthorpe United	0–1	Barnsley	Scunthorpe
19:45 GMT	Bishop (yellow card) 33'	Report	Mvoto (yellow card) 42' (yellow-red card) 56'; Scowen 51'; Pearson (yellow card) 74'	Stadium: Glanford Park; Attendance: 3,508; Referee: Michael Bull

28 February 2015 32	Scunthorpe United	1–1	Yeovil Town	Scunthorpe
15:00 GMT	Adelakun 61'	Report	Grant 28'; Foley (yellow card) 72'	Stadium: Glanford Park; Attendance: 3,783; Referee: Rob Lewis

3 March 2015 33	Fleetwood Town	2–2	Scunthorpe United	Fleetwood
19:45 GMT	Proctor 2'; Chicksen (yellow card) 38'; McLaughlin (yellow card) 56'; Morris 71'	Report	McSheffrey 45'; Evans 74'	Stadium: Highbury Stadium; Attendance: 2,667; Referee: Nigel Miller

7 March 2015 34	Crewe Alexandra	2–0	Scunthorpe United	Crewe
15:00 GMT	Leigh 54'; Haber 55'	Report	Osbourne (yellow card) 19'	Stadium: Gresty Road; Attendance: 4,213; Referee: Richard Clark

14 March 2015 35	Scunthorpe United	1–1	Sheffield United	Scunthorpe
15:00 GMT	Clarke (yellow card) 29'; Bishop 37'; Adelakun (yellow card) 90'	Report	Freeman 45'	Stadium: Glanford Park; Attendance: 5,550; Referee: Darren Handley

21 March 2015 36	Rochdale	3–1	Scunthorpe United	Rochdale
15:00 GMT	Rose 22'; Henderson 61'; Vincenti 84'	Report	60' van Veen	Stadium: Spotland

24 March 2015 37	Sheffield United	4–0	Scunthorpe United	Sheffield
	Holt 14'; Baxter 40' (pen.), 85' (pen.); Murphy 81'	Report		Stadium: Bramall Lane; Attendance: 19,442

28 March 2015 38	Notts County	2–2	Scunthorpe United	Nottingham
	Jones 10'; Bajner 73'	Report	Robinson 1'; Canavan 86'	Stadium: Meadow Lane; Attendance: 19,442

3 April 2015 39	Scunthorpe United	2–0	Peterborough United	Scunthorpe
	Madden 40'; Robinson 73'	Report		Stadium: Glanford Park; Attendance: 4,216

7 April 2015 40	Milton Keynes Dons	2–0	Scunthorpe United	Milton Keynes
	Grigg 2', 5' (pen.)	Report		Stadium: Stadium MK; Attendance: 8,087

11 April 2015 41	Scunthorpe United	2–1	Crawley Town	Scunthorpe
	Dickson 19' (o.g.); Madden 62'	Report	McLeod 77'	Stadium: Glanford Park; Attendance: 3,009

14 April 2015 42	Scunthorpe United	1–1	Port Vale	Scunthorpe
	Wootton 90'	Report	Duffy 43'	Stadium: Glanford Park; Attendance: 3,002

18 April 2015 43	Colchester United	2–2	Scunthorpe United	Colchester
	Eastman 81'; Porter 85'	Report	Robinson 30'; Adelakun 90'	Stadium: Colchester Community Stadium; Attendance: 4,551

21 April 2015 44	Scunthorpe United	1–1	Bradford City	Scunthorpe
	McSheffrey 26'	Report	Clarke 63'	Stadium: Glanford Park; Attendance: 3,176

25 April 2015 45	Scunthorpe United	2–1	Gillingham	Scunthorpe
	Adelakun 11'; McSheffrey 19'	Report	Norris 2'	Stadium: Glanford Park; Attendance: 3,736

3 May 2015 46	Doncaster Rovers	5–2	Scunthorpe United	Doncaster
	Canavan 12' (o.g.); Tyson 33', 74' (pen.), 80' (pen.); Jones 45'	Report	Butler 53' (o.g.); Adelakun 90'	Stadium: Keepmoat Stadium; Attendance: 9,394

=== FA Cup ===
9 November 2014 First round	Forest Green Rovers	0–2	Scunthorpe United	Nailsworth
14:00	Parkin (yellow card) 45'; Oshodi (yellow card) 62'	Report	McSheffrey 20', 60'; Nolan (yellow card) 65'	Stadium: The New Lawn; Attendance: 1,791; Referee: Graham Scott

7 December 2014 Second round	Scunthorpe United	1–1	Worcester City	Scunthorpe
14:00	Kee (yellow card) 35'; Madden 35'; Hawkridge (yellow card) 90+2'	Report	Weir (yellow card) 34'; Nti 46'	Stadium: Glanford Park; Attendance: 5,606; Referee: Graham Salisbury

17 December 2014 Second round replay	Worcester City	1–1 (a.e.t.) (13–14 p)	Scunthorpe United	Kidderminster
19:45	Geddes 69'	Report	Madden 45+2'	Stadium: Aggborough; Attendance: 4,339; Referee: Andy D'Urso
	Penalties
	Geddes (penalty scored); Wright (penalty missed); Deeney (penalty scored); Weir (penalty scored); Thomas (penalty scored); Jackman (penalty missed); Williams (penalty scored); Dunkley (penalty scored); Hutchinson (penalty scored); Vaughan (penalty scored); Geddes (penalty scored); Wright (penalty scored); Deeney (penalty scored); Weir (penalty scored); Thomas (penalty missed)		(penalty scored) Madden; (penalty scored) Williams; (penalty scored) Hawkridge; (penalty scored) Taylor; (penalty missed) Llera; (penalty missed) Sparrow; (penalty scored) Bishop; (penalty scored) Boyce; (penalty scored) Davey; (penalty scored) Slocombe; (penalty scored) Madden; (penalty scored) Williams; (penalty scored) Hawkridge; (penalty scored) Taylor; (penalty scored) Llera

6 January 2015 Third round	Scunthorpe United	2–2	Chesterfield	Scunthorpe
19:45	Davey 18'; Bishop (yellow card) 38'; Taylor 44'; Llera (yellow card) 57'; McSheffrey (yellow card) 80'	Report	Hird (yellow card) 4'; Doyle 71' (pen.); O'Shea 85'; Gardner (yellow card) 90+1'; Roberts (yellow card) 90+2'	Stadium: Glanford Park; Attendance: 4,307; Referee: Mark Haywood

13 January 2015 Third round replay	Chesterfield	2–0 (a.e.t.)	Scunthorpe United	Chesterfield
19:45	Morsy (yellow card) 84'; Clucas 105', 116'	Report	Nolan (yellow card) 35'; Boyce (yellow card) 41'; Sparrow (yellow card) 109'	Stadium: Proact Stadium; Attendance: 6,815; Referee: Keith Hill

=== League Cup ===
12 August 2014 First round	Blackburn Rovers	0–1	Scunthorpe United	Blackburn
19:45		Report	34' Bishop	Stadium: Ewood Park; Attendance: 5,352; Referee: Seb Stockinbridge

26 August 2014 Second round	Scunthorpe United	0–1	Reading	Scunthorpe
19:45		Report	Taylor 85'	Stadium: Glanford Park; Attendance: 2,567; Referee: Kevin Wright

=== Football League Trophy ===
2 September 2014 First round	Scunthorpe United	2–0	Chesterfield	Scunthorpe
19:45	McAllister 15'; McSheffrey 25'	Report	Broadhead (red card) 84'	Stadium: Glanford Park; Attendance: 2,004 (492 away); Referee: Darren Handley

7 October 2014 Second round	Scunthorpe United	1–2	Notts County	Scunthorpe
19:45	Madden 14' (yellow card) 76'	Report	McLaughlin 23' (yellow card) 44'; Murray 32'; Thompson (yellow card) 77'	Stadium: Glanford Park; Attendance: 1,509; Referee: Andy Haines (170 away)

== Kits ==
Supplier: Nike
Sponsor(s): Rainham Steel

Home	Away	Third

Last updated: 1 July 2014.
Source: Historic Football Kits -2014-15 League One

== Squad ==
No.	Name	Pos.	Nat.	Place of Birth	Age	Apps	Goals	Signed from	Date Signed	Free	Contract
Goalkeepers
1	Sam Slocombe	GK	(England)	Scunthorpe	38	133	0	Bottesford Town	15 August 2008	£35,000	2015
13	James Severn	GK	(England)	Nottingham	35	3	0	Derby County	17 May 2012	Free	2015
26	Luke Daniels	GK	(England)	Bolton	38	23	0	West Bromwich Albion	22 January 2015	Undisclosed	2017
39	Joe Anyon	GK	(England)	Lytham St Annes	39	0	0	Crewe Alexandra	26 January 2015	Free	2015
Defenders
2	Eddie Nolan	RB	(Republic of Ireland)	Waterford	38	308	1	Free agent	8 February 2013	Free	2015
5	David Mirfin	CB	(England)	Sheffield	41	213	8	Watford	31 July 2012	Free	2016
6	Niall Canavan	CB	(Republic of Ireland)	Leeds	35	152	6	Academy	1 July 2009	Trainee	2016
17	Conor Townsend	LB	(England)	Hessle	33	6	0	Hull City	28 February 2015	Loan	2015#
20	Callum Howe	CB	(England)	Doncaster	32	0	0	Academy	1 July 2012	Trainee	2015
25	Andrew Boyce	CB	(England)	Doncaster	36	36	1	Lincoln City	6 January 2014	Undisclosed	2016
30	Marcus Williams	LB	(England)	Doncaster	40	314	0	Sheffield United	10 January 2014	Free	2015
32	Miguel Llera	CB	(Spain)	Castilleja de la Cuesta	47	23	1	Sheffield Wednesday	31 July 2014	Free	2015
33	Jordan Clarke	RB	(England)	Coventry	34	23	0	Coventry City	10 January 2015	Undisclosed	2017
Midfielders
4	Sean McAllister	CM	(England)	Bolton	39	74	1	Cowdenbeath	19 July 2013	Free	2015
7	Matt Sparrow	AM	(England)	London	45	437	45	Crawley Town	4 July 2013	Free	2015
8	Dave Syers	CM	(England)	Leeds	38	43	10	Doncaster Rovers	10 January 2014	Undisclosed	2016
11	Jennison Myrie-Williams	LW	(England)	Lambeth	38	20	0	Port Vale	11 June 2014	Free	2016
12	Neal Bishop	CM	(England)	Stockton-on-Tees	45	44	5	Blackpool	19 June 2014	Free	2016
14	Terry Hawkridge	RW	(England)	Nottingham	36	66	2	Gainsborough Trinity	4 June 2013	Undisclosed	2016
15	George Evans	DM	(England)	Cheadle	31	16	1	Manchester City	30 April 2015	Loan	2015
16	Hakeeb Adelakun	LW	(England)	Hackney	30	71	8	Academy	1 July 2012	Trainee	2016
18	John Lundstram	AM	(England)	Liverpool	21	7	0	Everton	19 March 2015	Loan	2015
28	Gary McSheffrey	LW	(England)	Coventry	44	63	11	Chesterfield	14 January 2014	Free	2015
35	Isaiah Osbourne	CM	(England)	Birmingham	38	31	0	Free agent	17 October 2014	Free	2015
Forwards
9	Paddy Madden	CF	(Republic of Ireland)	Dublin	36	75	22	Yeovil Town	10 January 2014	£300,000	2016
10	Kevin van Veen	CF	(Netherlands)	Eindhoven	35	20	2	FC Oss	30 January 2015	Undisclosed	2018
19	Lyle Taylor	CF	(Montserrat)	Greenwich	36	25	4	Sheffield United	30 June 2014	Undisclosed	2016
24	Theo Robinson	CF/WG	(Jamaica)	Birmingham	26	9	3	Doncaster Rovers	26 March 2015	Loan	2015
29	Kyle Wootton	CF	(England)	Epworth	30	12	1	Academy	1 July 2014	Trainee	2015

=== Statistics ===
As of 4 May 2015

No.	Pos	Nat	Player	Total		League		FA Cup		League Cup		League Trophy	
No.	Pos	Nat	Player	Apps	Goals	Apps	Goals	Apps	Goals	Apps	Goals	Apps	Goals
1	GK	(England) ENG	Sam Slocombe	15	0	9+0	0	5+0	0	1+0	0	0+0	0
2	DF	(Republic of Ireland) IRL	Eddie Nolan	11	0	4+2	0	2+1	0	2+0	0	0+0	0
3	DF	(England) ENG	Andy Dawson	5	0	3+0	0	0+0	0	1+0	0	1+0	0
4	MF	(England) ENG	Sean McAllister	31	1	13+10	0	3+1	0	2+0	0	2+0	1
5	DF	(England) ENG	David Mirfin	0	0	0+0	0	0+0	0	0+0	0	0+0	0
6	DF	(Republic of Ireland) IRL	Niall Canavan	35	3	30+1	3	0+1	0	2+0	0	1+0	0
7	MF	(England) ENG	Matt Sparrow	12	1	6+3	1	0+3	0	0+0	0	0+0	0
8	MF	(England) ENG	Dave Syers	7	0	1+6	0	0+0	0	0+0	0	0+0	0
9	FW	(Republic of Ireland) IRL	Paddy Madden	54	17	45+0	14	5+0	2	2+0	0	2+0	1
10	FW	(Netherlands) NED	Kevin van Veen	20	2	11+9	2	0+0	0	0+0	0	0+0	0
11	MF	(England) ENG	Jennison Myrie-Williams	20	0	7+8	0	0+2	0	1+0	0	0+2	0
12	MF	(England) ENG	Neal Bishop	44	5	35+1	4	5+0	0	1+0	1	2+0	0
13	GK	(England) ENG	James Severn	2	0	1+1	0	0+0	0	0+0	0	0+0	0
14	MF	(England) ENG	Terry Hawkridge	17	0	10+1	0	1+2	0	1+0	0	2+0	0
15	MF	(England) ENG	George Evans (on loan from Manchester City)	15	1	8+7	1	0+0	0	0+0	0	0+0	0
16	MF	(England) ENG	Hakeeb Adelakun	39	6	7+24	6	2+3	0	1+0	0	1+1	0
17	DF	(England) ENG	Conor Townsend (on loan from Hull City)	4	0	3+1	0	0+0	0	0+0	0	0+0	0
18	MF	(England) ENG	John Lundstram (on loan from Everton)	7	0	4+3	0	0+0	0	0+0	0	0+0	0
19	FW	(Montserrat) MSR	Lyle Taylor	25	4	11+7	3	5+0	1	1+0	0	0+1	0
24	FW	(Jamaica) JAM	Theo Robinson (on loan from Doncaster Rovers)	9	3	9+0	3	0+0	0	0+0	0	0+0	0
25	DF	(England) ENG	Andrew Boyce	32	1	24+3	1	4+0	0	0+0	0	1+0	0
26	GK	(England) ENG	Luke Daniels	22	0	22+0	0	0+0	0	0+0	0	0+0	0
28	MF	(England) ENG	Gary McSheffrey	47	11	34+5	8	4+0	2	2+0	0	2+0	1
29	FW	(England) ENG	Kyle Wootton	12	1	0+11	1	0+1	0	0+0	0	0+0	0
30	DF	(England) ENG	Marcus Williams	45	0	38+0	0	5+0	0	1+0	0	1+0	0
32	DF	(Spain) ESP	Miguel Llera	22	1	14+0	1	5+0	0	1+0	0	2+0	0
33	DF	(England) ENG	Jordan Clarke	22	0	22+0	0	0+0	0	0+0	0	0+0	0
35	MF	(England) ENG	Isaiah Osbourne	30	0	23+4	0	3+0	0	0+0	0	0+0	0
39	GK	(England) ENG	Joe Anyon	0	0	0+0	0	0+0	0	0+0	0	0+0	0
Players who left during the course of the season:
10	FW	(Jamaica) JAM	Deon Burton	5	0	1+4	0	0+0	0	0+0	0	0+0	0
18	DF	(England) ENG	Miles Addison (on loan from Bournemouth)	5	0	3+0	0	0+0	0	2+0	0	0+0	0
18	FW	(England) ENG	Luke Williams (on loan from Middlesbrough)	6	2	6+0	2	0+0	0	0+0	0	0+0	0
22	DF	(England) ENG	Liam O'Neil (on loan from West Bromwich Albion)	19	2	19+0	2	0+0	0	0+0	0	0+0	0
24	DF	(England) ENG	Luke O'Neill (on loan from Burnley)	17	0	15+0	0	0+0	0	0+0	0	2+0	0
24	DF	(England) ENG	Richard Brindley (on loan from Rotherham United)	2	0	2+0	0	0+0	0	0+0	0	0+0	0
24	FW	(England) ENG	Jacob Murphy (on loan from Norwich City)	3	0	3+0	0	0+0	0	0+0	0	0+0	0
26	GK	(Austria) AUT	Bobby Olejnik (on loan from Peterborough United)	16	0	13+0	0	0+0	0	1+0	0	2+0	0
27	FW	(England) ENG	Billy Kee	16	0	0+12	0	1+1	0	0+0	0	0+2	0
33	DF	(England) ENG	Shaun Brisley (on loan from Peterborough United)	8	0	7+1	0	0+0	0	0+0	0	0+0	0
34	FW	(New Zealand) NZL	Rory Fallon	5	3	4+0	3	0+0	0	0+0	0	1+0	0
34	FW	(England) ENG	Tom Hopper (on loan from Leicester City)	12	4	12+0	4	0+0	0	0+0	0	0+0	0
37	DF	(England) ENG	Alex Davey (on loan from Chelsea)	17	1	13+0	0	4+0	1	0+0	0	0+0	0

==== Goals record ====
As of 13 May 2015

Rank	No.	Po.	Name	League One	FA Cup	League Cup	League Trophy	Total
1	9	FW	(Republic of Ireland) Paddy Madden	14	2	0	1	17
2	28	MF	(England) Gary McSheffrey	8	2	0	1	11
3	16	MF	(England) Hakeeb Adelakun	6	0	0	0	6
4	12	MF	(England) Neal Bishop	4	0	1	0	5
5	19	FW	(Montserrat) Lyle Taylor	3	1	0	0	4
5	~~34~~	FW	(England) Tom Hopper	4	0	0	0	4
7	6	DF	(Republic of Ireland) Niall Canavan	3	0	0	0	3
7	24	FW	(Jamaica) Theo Robinson	3	0	0	0	3
7	~~34~~	FW	(New Zealand) Rory Fallon	3	0	0	0	3
10	10	FW	(Netherlands) Kevin van Veen	1	0	0	0	1
10	~~18~~	FW	(England) Luke Williams	2	0	0	0	2
10	~~22~~	DF	(England) Liam O'Neil	2	0	0	0	2
13	4	MF	(England) Sean McAllister	0	0	0	1	1
13	7	MF	(England) Matt Sparrow	1	0	0	0	1
13	15	MF	(England) George Evans	1	0	0	0	1
13	25	DF	(England) Andrew Boyce	1	0	0	0	1
13	29	FW	(England) Kyle Wootton	1	0	0	0	1
13	32	DF	(Spain) Miguel Llera	1	0	0	0	1
13	~~37~~	DF	(England) Alex Davey	0	1	0	0	1
Own Goals				4	0	0	0	4
Total				64	6	1	3	74

==== Disciplinary record ====
As of 13 May 2015

No.	Po.	Name	League One		FA Cup		League Cup		League Trophy		Total	
No.	Po.	Name	Yellow card	Red card	Yellow card	Red card	Yellow card	Red card	Yellow card	Red card	Yellow card	Red card
2	DF	(Republic of Ireland) Eddie Nolan	0	0	2	0	0	0	0	0	2	0
3	DF	(England) Andy Dawson	1	0	0	0	0	0	0	0	1	0
4	MF	(England) Sean McAllister	1	0	0	0	0	0	0	0	1	0
6	DF	(Republic of Ireland) Niall Canavan	3	0	0	0	0	0	0	0	3	0
7	MF	(England) Matt Sparrow	1	0	2	0	0	0	0	0	3	0
9	FW	(Republic of Ireland) Paddy Madden	3	0	0	0	0	0	1	0	4	0
10	FW	(Netherlands) Kevin van Veen	2	0	0	0	0	0	0	0	2	0
11	MF	(England) Jennison Myrie-Williams	3	1	0	0	0	0	1	0	4	1
12	MF	(England) Neal Bishop	10	0	2	0	0	0	0	0	12	0
14	MF	(England) Terry Hawkridge	0	0	1	0	0	0	0	0	1	0
16	MF	(England) Hakeeb Adelakun	3	0	0	0	0	0	0	0	3	0
~~18~~	FW	(England) Luke Williams	4	0	0	0	0	0	0	0	4	0
19	FW	(Montserrat) Lyle Taylor	0	0	0	0	0	0	1	0	1	0
~~22~~	DF	(England) Liam O'Neil	2	0	0	0	0	0	0	0	2	0
~~24~~	DF	(England) Luke O'Neill	4	0	0	0	0	0	0	0	4	0
24	FW	(Jamaica) Theo Robinson	1	0	0	0	0	0	0	0	1	0
25	DF	(England) Andrew Boyce	7	0	1	0	0	0	0	0	8	0
~~26~~	GK	(Austria) Bobby Olejnik	1	0	0	0	0	0	0	0	1	0
~~27~~	FW	(England) Billy Kee	2	0	1	0	0	0	0	0	3	0
28	MF	(England) Gary McSheffrey	11	0	1	0	1	0	0	0	13	0
30	DF	(England) Marcus Williams	2	0	1	0	0	0	0	0	3	0
32	DF	(Spain) Miguel Llera	4	0	1	0	1	0	1	0	7	0
~~33~~	DF	(England) Shaun Brisley	2	0	0	0	0	0	0	0	2	0
33	DF	(England) Jordan Clarke	9	0	0	0	0	0	0	0	9	0
35	MF	(England) Isaiah Osbourne	4	0	0	0	0	0	0	0	4	0
Total			80	1	12	0	2	0	3	0	97	1

== Transfers ==
=== In ===
No.	Pos.	Nat.	Name	Age	EU	Moving from	Type	Transfer window	Ends	Transfer fee	Source
11	MF	(England)	Jennison Myrie-Williams	26	EU	Port Vale	Bosman	Summer	2016	Free	
12	MF	(England)	Neal Bishop	32	EU	Blackpool	Bosman	Summer	2016	Free	
19	FW	(Montserrat)	Lyle Taylor	24	EU	Sheffield United	Transfer	Summer	2016	Undisclosed	
32	DF	(Spain)	Miguel Llera	34	EU	Sheffield Wednesday	Bosman	Summer	2015	Free	
27	FW	(Northern Ireland)	Billy Kee	23	EU	Burton Albion	Transfer	Summer	2016	Undisclosed	
	MF	(England)	Nicky Featherstone	25	EU	Walsall	Bosman	Summer	Undisclosed	Free	
34	FW	(New Zealand)	Rory Fallon	32	EU	Crawley Town	Bosman	Summer	2014	Free	
35	MF	(England)	Isaiah Osbourne	26	EU	Blackpool	Bosman	Summer	2015	Free	
33	DF	(England)	Jordan Clarke	23	EU	Coventry City	Transfer	Winter	2017	Undisclosed	
26	GK	(England)	Luke Daniels	27	EU	West Bromwich Albion	Transfer	Winter	2017	Undisclosed	
39	GK	(England)	Joe Anyon	28	EU	Shrewsbury Town	Bosman	Winter	2015	Free	
—	FW	(Netherlands)	Kevin van Veen	23	EU	Oss (Netherlands)	Transfer	Winter	2018	Undisclosed	

=== Loans in ===
No.	Pos.	Name	Country	Age	Loan club	Started	Ended	Start source	End source
18	MF	Miles Addison	(England)	25	Bournemouth	28 July 2014	8 September 2014		
24	DF	Luke O'Neill	(England)	22	Burnley	18 August 2014	18 November 2014		
26	GK	Bobby Olejnik	(Austria)	27	Peterborough United	19 August 2014	16 September 2014		
33	DF	Shaun Brisley	(England)	24	Peterborough United	25 September 2014	3 January 2015		
18	FW	Luke Williams	(England)	21	Middlesbrough	23 October 2014	3 January 2015		
22	DF	Liam O'Neil	(England)	21	West Bromwich Albion	13 November 2014	30 June 2015		
24	DF	Richard Brindley	(England)	21	Rotherham United	25 November 2014	3 January 2015		
37	DF	Alex Davey	(Scotland)	20	Chelsea	27 November 2014	3 January 2015		
34	FW	Tom Hopper	(England)	21	Leicester City	8 January 2015	30 June 2015		
24	FW	Jacob Murphy	(England)	19	Norwich City	8 January 2015	11 February 2015		
15	MF	George Evans	(England)	20	Manchester City	30 January 2015	30 June 2015		
17	DF	Conor Townsend	(England)	21	Hull City	28 February 2015	30 June 2015		
18	MF	John Lundstram	(England)	21	Everton	19 March 2015	18 April 2015		
—	FW	Theo Robinson	(England)	26	Doncaster Rovers	26 March 2015	30 June 2015		

Sources: For loan start source see "Start source". For loan end source see "End source".
EU = if holds or not a European Union passport; Country: when 2 flags, 1st flag = country that plays for internationally, 2nd flag = country of birth; No. = number on jersey; P = Position (for position name, pause mouse pointer on abbreviation); Name = Name on jersey (for more extensive name, pause mouse pointer on name); In/Out = In: The player came in on loan, Out: The player went out on loan; Loan club = the club that the player moved on loan to or the club that the player came from on loan; Started = the date when the player's loan started; Ended = the date when the player's loan ended.

=== Out ===
No.	Pos.	Name	Country	Age	Type	Moving to	Transfer window	Transfer fee	Apps	Goals	Source
19	MF	Michael Collins	(Republic of Ireland)	28	Released	Oxford United	Summer	Free	86	4	
10	MF	Etiënne Esajas	(Netherlands)	29	Released	Free agent	Summer	Free	15	2	
17	FW	Matt Godden	(England)	22	Transfer	Ebbsfleet United	Summer	Free	16	0	
	DF	George Grayson	(England)	19	Released	Tamworth	Summer	Free	0	0	
39	FW	Paul Hayes	(England)	30	Released	Wycombe Wanderers	Summer	Free	282	78	
12	FW	Connor Jennings	(England)	22	Released	Wrexham (Wales)	Summer	Free	20	1	
2	DF	Christian Ribeiro	(Wales)	24	Released	Exeter City	Summer	Free	67	2	
11	MF	Andy Welsh	(England)	30	Released	Free agent	Summer	Free	4	1	
23	FW	Jamie Wootton	(England)	19	Released	Free agent	Summer	Free	2	0	
29	FW	Sam Winnall	(England)	23	Transfer	Barnsley	Summer	Undisclosed	49	23	
15	DF	Luke Waterfall	(England)	24	Free transfer	Wrexham (Wales)	Winter	Free	9	1	
10	FW	Deon Burton	(England)	38	Released	Eastleigh	Winter	Free	36	6	

EU = if holds or not a European Union passport; Country: when 2 flags, 1st flag = country that plays for internationally, 2nd flag = country of birth; N = number on jersey; P = Position (for position name, pause mouse pointer on abbreviation); Name = Name on jersey (for more extensive name, pause mouse pointer on name); Age = age on the day of the signing; Moving from = only indicate the club the player was playing before start playing for this club in this season, for the type of the moving see Status column; Moving to = only indicates the club the player is going to play next, for the type of the moving see Status column; Ends = when the player's current contract ends; n/a = Not applicable; Apps = Total number of competitive appearances (including substitute appearances) at the club prior to departure; Goals = Total number of competitive goals scored at the club prior to departure.

=== Loans out ===
No.	Pos.	Name	Country	Age	Loan club	Started	Ended	Start source	End source
25	DF	Andrew Boyce	(England)	24	Grimsby Town	4 August 2014	25 September 2014		
15	DF	Luke Waterfall	(England)	24	Macclesfield Town	5 August 2014	31 October 2014		
17	FW	Curtis Bateson	(England)	19	Gainsborough Trinity	22 August 2014	18 October 2014		
20	DF	Callum Howe	(England)	20	Gateshead	10 October 2014	7 November 2014		
13	GK	James Severn	(England)	23	Alfreton Town	24 October 2014	21 November 2014		
10	FW	Deon Burton	(Jamaica)	38	York City	30 October 2014	29 November 2014		
15	DF	Luke Waterfall	(England)	24	Mansfield Town	7 November 2014	1 January 2015		
27	FW	Billy Kee	(Northern Ireland)	24	Mansfield Town	5 January 2015	30 March 2015		
11	MF	Jennison Myrie-Williams	(England)	26	Tranmere Rovers	20 January 2015	30 June 2015		
5	DF	David Mirfin	(England)	29	Hartlepool United	2 February 2015	7 March 2015		
19	FW	Lyle Taylor	(Montserrat)	24	Partick Thistle	2 February 2015	30 June 2015		
7	MF	Matt Sparrow	(England)	33	Cheltenham Town	26 February 2015	30 June 2015		
14	MF	Terry Hawkridge	(England)	25	Mansfield Town	20 March 2015	30 June 2015		

Sources: For loan start source see "Start source". For loan end source see "End source".
EU = if holds or not a European Union passport; Country: when 2 flags, 1st flag = country that plays for internationally, 2nd flag = country of birth; No. = number on jersey; P = Position (for position name, pause mouse pointer on abbreviation); Name = Name on jersey (for more extensive name, pause mouse pointer on name); In/Out = In: The player came in on loan, Out: The player went out on loan; Loan club = the club that the player moved on loan to or the club that the player came from on loan; Started = the date when the player's loan started; Ended = the date when the player's loan ended.
