= 2013–14 Scunthorpe United F.C. season =

Scunthorpe United
2013–14 season
- Chairman: Peter Swann
- Manager: Brian Laws (until 20 November 2013); Russ Wilcox (from 20 November 2013)
- Stadium: Glanford Park
- League Two: 2nd (promoted)
- FA Cup: First round
- Football League Cup: First round
- Football League Trophy: First round
- Top goalscorer: League: Sam Winnall (23); All: Sam Winnall (23)
- Highest home attendance: 7,482 vs York City (L2, 3 May 14)
- Lowest home attendance: 2,352 vs Sheffield United (JPT, 3 Sep 13)
- Average home league attendance: 3,719

The 2013–14 season is Scunthorpe United's 1st in the fourth division of English football since 2005, following their relegation from League One the previous season.

== Pre-season ==
6 July	Brigg Town	1–7	Scunthorpe United	Brigg
15:00 BST	Freeman 55'	Report	13', 15', 32' Esajas; 20' Canavan; 28' Godden; 49' Hawkridge; 74' K Wooton	Stadium: The Hawthorns

9 July	Gainsborough Trinity	1–2	Scunthorpe United	Gainsborough
15:00 BST	Wilde 56'		49' Gooden; 82' J Wooton	Stadium: Northolme

13 July	Scunthorpe United	0–1	Sheffield Wednesday	Scunthorpe
15:00 BST		Report	Hélan 41'	Stadium: Glanford Park

20 July Lincolnshire Cup – Quarter Finals	Scunthorpe United	3–0	Grimsby Town	Scunthorpe
15:00 BST	Mirfin 30'; Winnall 90'; Burton 90'	Report		Stadium: Glanford Park

22 July	Winterton Rangers	0–5	Scunthorpe United	Winterton
19:45 BST		Report	15' Waterfall; 31' J Wootton; 45' Winnall; 87' K Wootton; 89' Smythe	Stadium: West Street

24 July	Bottesford Town	0–6	Scunthorpe United	Bottesford
19:45 BST		Report	6' Welsh; 19', 52' Godden; 24' McAllister; 34' Hornsey; 55' Wootton	Stadium: Birch Park

30 July Lincolnshire Cup – Semi-Finals	Lincoln City	2–0	Scunthopre United	Lincoln
19:45 BST	Fairhurst 27', 64'	Report		Stadium: Sincil Bank; Attendance: 918

== League Two ==
=== League table ===
Pos	Team	Pld	W	D	L	GF	GA	GD	Pts	Promotion, qualification or relegation
1	Chesterfield (C, P)	46	23	15	8	71	40	+31	84	Promotion to Football League One
2	Scunthorpe United (P)	46	20	21	5	68	44	+24	81	Promotion to Football League One
3	Rochdale (P)	46	24	9	13	69	48	+21	81	Promotion to Football League One
4	Fleetwood Town (O, P)	46	22	10	14	66	52	+14	76	Qualification for League Two play-offs
5	Southend United	46	19	15	12	56	39	+17	72	Qualification for League Two play-offs

Updated to match(es) played on 3 May 2014. Source: BBC Sport
Rules for classification: 1) Points; 2) Goal difference; 3) Number of goals scored
(C) Champions; (O) Play-off winners; (P) Promoted

=== Result summary ===
Overall								Home						Away					
Pld	W	D	L	GF	GA	GD	Pts	W	D	L	GF	GA	GD	W	D	L	GF	GA	GD
44	19	20	5	66	43	+23	77	10	10	2	31	18	+13	9	10	3	35	25	+10

Last updated: 6 May 2014.

=== Result by round ===
Round	1	2	3	4	5	6	7	8	9	10	11	12	13	14	15	16	17	18	19	20	21	22	23	24	25	26	27	28	29	30	31	32	33	34	35	36	37	38	39	40	41	42	43	44	45	46
Ground	H	A	H	A	H	A	A	H	A	H	H	A	H	A	A	H	A	A	H	A	H	A	A	H	A	H	A	H	A	H	A	H	H	A	H	H	A	H	A	H	A	H	A	H	A	H
Result	W	D	D	L	D	D	W	W	D	W	L	W	W	L	D	L	W	W	W	D	W	D	W	W	W	D	D	D	D	D	W	W	D	D	D	D	W	W	W	D	W	D	D	W	L	D
Position	6	5	8	9	14	15	7	10	11	7	13	12	9	9	8	12	8	6	4	5	3	3	2	1	1	1	1	1	2	2	2	2	2	2	2	2	2	2	2	2	2	1	1	1	3	2

A = Away; H = Home; W = Win; D = Draw; L = Loss

=== Matches ===
3 August 1	Scunthorpe United	2–0	Mansfield Town	Scunthorpe
15:00 BST	Sparrow 30'; Winnall 41'; Nolan (yellow card) 63' (yellow-red card) 90'	Report		Stadium: Glanford Park; Attendance: 5,241; Referee: Eddie Ilderton

10 August 2	Bristol Rovers	0–0	Scunthorpe United	Bristol
15:00 BST		Report		Stadium: Memorial Stadium; Attendance: 6,259; Referee: Brendan Malone

17 August 3	Scunthorpe United	1–1	Dagenham & Redbridge	Scunthorpe
15:00 BST	Mirfin 88'	Report	90' Howell	Stadium: Glanford Park; Attendance: 3,694; Referee: Darren Deadman

24 August 4	AFC Wimbledon	3–2	Scunthorpe United	Kingston upon Thames
15:00 BST	Smith 62'; Pell 75'; Arthur 87'	Report	16' Winnall; 31' Iwelumo	Stadium: Kingsmeadow; Referee: Clark

31 August 5	Scunthorpe United	1–1	Newport County	Scunthorpe
15:00 BST	Winnall 2'	Report	62' Hughes	Stadium: Glanford Park; Attendance: 3,157; Referee: Horwood

7 September 6	Northampton Town	1–1	Scunthorpe United	Northampton
15:00 BST	Platt 78'	Report	67' Canavan	Stadium: Sixfields Stadium; Attendance: 4,132; Referee: Seb Stockbridge

13 September 7	Southend United	0–1	Scunthorpe United	Southend-on-Sea
19:45 BST		Report	64' Iwelumo	Stadium: Roots Hall; Attendance: 4,976; Referee: Coote

21 September 8	Scunthorpe United	1–0	Plymouth Argyle	Scunthorpe
15:00 BST	Esajas 62'	Report		Stadium: Glanford Park; Attendance: 3,298; Referee: Scott

28 September 9	Burton Albion	2–2	Scunthorpe United	Burton-on-Trent
15:00 BST	Kee 37'; Weir 62'	Report	48' Burton; 52' Canavan	Stadium: Pirelli Stadium; Attendance: 2,556; Referee: Keith Stroud

5 October 10	Scunthorpe United	2–0	Cheltenham Town	Scunthorpe
15:00 BST	Esajas 6'; Winnall 90'	Report		Stadium: Glanford Park; Attendance: 3,191; Referee: Darren Bond

19 October 11	Scunthorpe United	0–4	Exeter City	Scunthorpe
15:00 BST		Report	34', 50' Sercombe; 49' Davies; 90' Parkin	Stadium: Glanford Park; Attendance: 3,250; Referee: Charles Breakspear

22 October 12	Fleetwood Town	0–1	Scunthorpe United	Fleetwood
19:45 BST		Report	59' Winnall	Stadium: Highbury Stadium; Attendance: 2,492; Referee: Mark Heywood

26 October 13	Scunthorpe United	1–0	Hartlepool United	Scunthorpe
15:00 BST	Winnall 76'	Report		Stadium: Glanford Park; Attendance: 3,613; Referee: Chris Sarginson

29 October 14	York City	4–1	Scunthorpe United	York
19:45 BST	Carson 3'; Fletcher 12'; Brobbel 21', 40'	Report	47' Winnall	Stadium: Bootham Crescent; Attendance: 3,636; Referee: Andy Madley

2 November 15	Chesterfield	1–1	Scunthorpe United	Chesterfield
15:00 BST	Richards 8'	Report	88' Waterfall	Stadium: Proact Stadium; Attendance: 6,346; Referee: Scott Duncan

16 November 16	Scunthorpe United	0–2	Accrington Stanley	Scunthorpe
15:00 BST		Report	26' Bowerman; 36' Odejayi	Stadium: Glanford Park; Attendance: 3,255; Referee: Richard Clark

23 November 17	Portsmouth	1–2	Scunthorpe United	Portsmouth
15:00 BST	Craddock 36'	Report	40', 70' Syers	Stadium: Fratton Park; Attendance: 14,550; Referee: Trevor Kettle

26 November 18	Rochdale	0–4	Scunthorpe United	Rochdale
19:45 BST	Lancashire (yellow card) 66' (yellow-red card) 69'; O'Connell (red card) 74'	Report	40' Canavan; 75' (pen.) Winnall; 86' Spencer; 90' Syers	Stadium: Spotland; Attendance: 2,174; Referee: Tony Harrington

30 November 19	Scunthorpe United	3–1	Torquay United	Scunthorpe
15:00 BST	Winnall 6'; O'Connor 30' (o.g.); Adelakun 61'	Report		Stadium: Glanford Park; Attendance: 3,358; Referee: Steve Rushton

14 December 20	Wycombe Wanderers	1–1	Scunthorpe United	High Wycombe
15:00 GMT	Scowen (yellow card) 67' (yellow-red card) 70'; Johnson 90'	Report	49' Burton	Stadium: Adams Park; Attendance: 2,888; Referee: Fred Graham

21 December 21	Scunthorpe United	2–0	Morecambe	Scunthorpe
15:00 GMT	Burton 17', 33'	Report		Stadium: Glanford Park; Attendance: 3,510; Referee: David Webb

26 December 22	Bury	2–2	Scunthorpe United	Bury
15:00 GMT	Sedgewick 75'; Nardiello 90'	Report	39', 68' (yellow card) 62' (yellow-red card) 69' Winnall	Stadium: Gigg Lane; Attendance: 3,277; Referee: Geoff Eltringham

29 December 23	Oxford United	0–2	Scunthorpe United	Oxford
12:45 GMT		Report	11' Burton; 72' Syers	Stadium: Kassam Stadium; Attendance: 6,009; Referee: Andy Madley

1 January 24	Scunthorpe United	3–0	Rochdale	Scunthorpe
15:00 GMT	Syers 58'; Winnall 82', 84'	Report	(yellow card) 47' (yellow-red card) 80' Rose	Stadium: Glanford Park; Attendance: 4,017; Referee: Andy Woolmer

11 January 25	Mansfield Town	0–2	Scunthorpe United	Mansfield
15:00 GMT		Report	9', 74' Hayes	Stadium: One Call Stadium; Attendance: 4,115; Referee: Nigel Miller

18 January 2014 26	Scunthorpe United	0–0	AFC Wimbledon	Scunthorpe
15:00 GMT		Report		Stadium: Glanford Park; Attendance: 4,326; Referee: Paul Tierney

25 January 2014 27	Dagenham & Redbridge	3–3	Scunthorpe United	London
15:00 GMT	Ogogo 67'; Dickson 77'; Norris 89'	Report	18' Winnall; 56' Burton; 61' Hayes	Stadium: Victoria Road; Attendance: 2,037; Referee: Darren Bond

27 January 2014 28	Scunthorpe United	0–0	Fleetwood Town	Scunthorpe
19:45 GMT		Report		Stadium: Glanford Park; Attendance: 3,005; Referee: Scott Duncan

1 February 2014 29	Hartlepool United	0–0	Scunthorpe United	Hartlepool
15:00 GMT		Report		Stadium: Victoria Park; Attendance: 3,727; Referee: Jeremy Simpson

8 February 2014 30	Scunthorpe United	1–1	Chesterfield	Scunthorpe
15:00 GMT	Winnall 15'	Report	45' (pen.) Doyle	Stadium: Glanford Park; Attendance: 6,131; Referee: Lee Mason

14 February 2014 31	Accrington Stanley	2–3	Scunthorpe United	Accrington
19:45 GMT	Moleyneux 18'; Murphy 37'	Report	50' Winnall; 59' Adelakun; 90' Mirfin	Stadium: Crown Ground; Attendance: 1,256; Referee: Steve Martin

22 February 2014 32	Scunthorpe United	5–1	Portsmouth	Scunthorpe
15:00 GMT	Syers 6', 43', 55'; Winnall 36'; Madden 48'	Report	86' Drennan	Stadium: Glanford Park; Attendance: 4,165; Referee: Lee Collins

25 February 2014 33	Scunthorpe United	1–1	Bristol Rovers	Scunthorpe
19:45 GMT	Winnall 22'	Report	89' Gillespie	Stadium: Glanford Park; Attendance: 3,318; Referee: Mark Heywood

1 March 2014 34	Newport County	2–2	Scunthorpe United	Newport
15:00 GMT	Minshull 25'; Zebroski 90'	Report	61' Madden; 83' Syers	Stadium: Rodney Parade; Attendance: 2,782; Referee: Carl Berry

8 March 2014 35	Scunthorpe United	1–1	Northampton Town	Scunthorpe
15:00 GMT	Canavan 52'	Report	(yellow card) 48' (yellow-red card) Ravenhill; 65' Diamond	Stadium: Glanford Park; Attendance: 3,968; Referee: Kevin Wright

11 March 2014 36	Scunthorpe United	2–2	Southend United	Scunthorpe
19:45 GMT	Sparrow 3'; Winnall 39'	Report	62' Egan; 69' White	Stadium: Glanford Park; Attendance: 3,018; Referee: Mark Brown

15 March 2014 37	Plymouth Argyle	0–2	Scunthorpe United	Plymouth
15:00 GMT		Report	79' Syers; 90' (o.g.) Cole	Stadium: Home Park; Attendance: 8,198; Referee: Darren Drysdale

22 March 2014 38	Scunthorpe United	1–0	Burton Albion	Scunthorpe
15:00 GMT	Madden 60'	Report		Stadium: Glanford Park; Attendance: 4,209; Referee: Geoff Eltringham

25 March 2014 39	Cheltenham Town	0–2	Scunthorpe United	Cheltenham
19:45 GMT		Report	45', 59' Winnall	Stadium: Whaddon Road; Attendance: 2,080; Referee: Charles Breakspear

29 March 2014 40	Scunthorpe United	0–0	Wycombe Wanderers	Scunthorpe
15:00 GMT		Report		Stadium: Glanford Park; Attendance: 3,867; Referee: James Adcock

5 April 2014 41	Torquay United	0–1	Scunthorpe United	Torquay
15:00 BST	Stockley (red card) 90'	Report	31' (pen.) Winnall	Stadium: Plainmoor; Attendance: 2,234; Referee: Michael Bull

12 April 2014 42	Scunthorpe United	2–2	Bury	Scunthorpe
15:00 BST	Madden 62'; Hayes 77'	Report	69' Soares; 90' Rose	Stadium: Glanford Park; Attendance: 4,162; Referee: Andy Haines

18 April 2014 43	Morecambe	1–1	Scunthorpe United	Morecambe
15:00 BST	Simpson 90'	Report	22' Winnall	Stadium: The Globe Arena; Attendance: 2,952; Referee: Mark Heywood

21 April 2014 44	Scunthorpe United	1–0	Oxford United	Scunthorpe
19:45 BST	Sparrow 15'	Report		Stadium: Glanford Park; Attendance: 5,241; Referee: Scott Mathieson

26 April 2014 45	Exeter City	2–0	Scunthorpe United	Exeter
15:00 BST	Woodman 45'; Keohane 49'	Report		Stadium: St James Park; Attendance: 4,187; Referee: Trevor Kettle

3 May 2014 46	Scunthorpe United	2–2	York City	Scunthorpe
15:00 BST	Madden 19'; Hawkridge 38'	Report	45' Brobbel; 71' Hayhurst	Stadium: Glanford Park; Attendance: 7,482; Referee: Nigel Miller

== FA Cup ==
9 November First round	Grimsby Town	0–0	Scunthorpe United	Grimsby
13:00 BST		Report		Stadium: Blundell Park; Referee: David Coote

19 November First round replay	Scunthorpe United	1–2	Grimsby Town	Scunthorpe
19:45 BST	Hawkridge 46'	Report	10' John-Lewis; 58' McDonald	Stadium: Glanford Park; Attendance: 5,699; Referee: Stuart Atwell

== League Cup ==
6 August First round	Barnsley	0–0 (a.e.t.) (5–4 p)	Scunthorpe United	Barnsley
19:45 BST				Stadium: Oakwell; Attendance: 5,238; Referee: Paul Tierney
	Penalties
	Dagnall (penalty missed); Scotland (penalty missed); Cywka (penalty scored); Dawson (penalty scored); Perkins (penalty scored); Steele (penalty missed); O'Brien (penalty missed); Golbourne (penalty scored); O'Grady (penalty scored)		(penalty missed) Hawkridge; (penalty scored) Collins; (penalty missed) Sparrow; (penalty scored) Iwelumo; (penalty scored) Godden; (penalty missed) Welsh; (penalty missed) Slocombe; (penalty scored) Mirfin; (penalty missed) Canavan

== Johnstone's Paint Trophy ==
3 September First round	Scunthorpe United	0–0 (a.e.t.) (3–5 p)	Sheffield United	Scunthorpe
19:45 BST		Report		Stadium: Glanford Park; Attendance: 2,352; Referee: Jay Simpson
	Penalties
	Burton (penalty scored); Dawson (penalty scored); Welsh (penalty missed); Hawkridge (penalty scored)		(penalty scored) Collins; (penalty scored) Baxter; (penalty scored) Coady; (penalty scored) Taylor; (penalty scored) McGinty

== Kit ==
Supplier: Nike
Sponsor(s): Rainham Steel

Home	Away

Last updated: 10 July 2013.
Source: Historic Football Kits -2013-14 League One

== Squad ==
No.	Name	Position(s)	Nationality	Place of Birth	Date of Birth (Age)	Club Apps	Club Goals	Int. Apps	Int. Goals	Date Signed	Signed from	Free	Contract
Goalkeepers
1	Sam Slocombe	GK	(England)	Scunthorpe	5 June 1988 (aged 26)	68	0	–	–	15 August 2008	Bottesford Town	£35,000	30 June 2015
13	James Severn	GK	(England)	Nottingham	10 October 1991 (aged 22)	1	0	–	–	17 May 2012	Derby County	Free	30 June 2014
Defenders
2	Christian Ribeiro	RB/CB	(Wales)	Neath	14 December 1989 (aged 24)	42	2	2	0	9 July 2012	Bristol City	Free	30 June 2014
3	Andy Dawson	LB/LW	(England)	Northallerton	20 October 1978 (aged 35)	227	11	–	–	30 May 2013	Hull City	Free	30 June 2014
5	David Mirfin	CB	(England)	Sheffield	18 April 1985 (aged 29)	164	6	–	–	31 July 2012	Watford	Free	30 June 2014
6	Niall Canavan	CB/RB	(Republic of Ireland)	Leeds	11 April 1991 (aged 23)	77	8	–	–	1 July 2009	Academy	Trainee	30 June 2014
15	Luke Waterfall	CB	(England)	Sheffield	30 July 1990 (aged 23)	–	–	–	–	4 June 2013	Gainsborough Trinity	Free	30 June 2014
18	Eddie Nolan	RB/LB	(Republic of Ireland)	Waterford	5 August 1988 (aged 25)	86	1	3	0	8 February 2013	Free agent	Free	30 June 2014
20	Callum Howe	CB	(England)	Doncaster	9 April 1994 (aged 20)	–	–	–	–	1 July 2012	Academy	Trainee	30 June 2014
21	George Grayson	LB	(England)	Sheffield	27 September 1994 (aged 19)	–	–	–	–	1 July 2013	Academy	Trainee	30 June 2014
25	Andrew Boyce	CB	(England)	Doncaster	5 November 1989 (aged 24)	–	–	–	–	6 January 2014	Lincoln City	Undisclosed	30 June 2015
30	Marcus Williams	LB/CB	(England)	Doncaster	8 April 1986 (aged 28)	205	0	–	–	10 January 2014	Sheffield United	Free	30 June 2015
Midfielders
4	Sean McAllister	CM	(England)	Bolton	15 August 1987 (aged 26)	–	–	–	–	19 July 2013	Cowdenbeath	Free	30 June 2014
7	Matt Sparrow	AM/RM	(England)	Wembley	3 October 1981 (aged 32)	396	42	–	–	4 July 2013	Crawley Town	Free	30 June 2015
10	Etiënne Esajas	LW/RW	(Netherlands)	Amsterdam	4 November 1984 (aged 29)	–	–	–	–	15 July 2013	Swindon Town	Free	30 June 2014
11	Andy Welsh	RM/LM	(England)	Manchester	24 November 1983 (aged 30)	–	–	–	–	1 August 2013	Carlisle United	Free	30 June 2014
14	Terry Hawkridge	RW	(England)	Nottingham	23 February 1990 (aged 24)	–	–	–	–	4 June 2013	Gainsborough Trinity	Free	30 June 2014
19	Michael Collins	CM/LM	(Republic of Ireland)	Halifax	30 April 1986 (aged 28)	69	4	–	–	6 July 2010	Huddersfield Town	£300,000	30 June 2014
22	Luke Hornsey	RW/CM	(England)	Ashby	26 March 1994 (aged 20)	0	0	–	–	1 July 2013	Academy	Trainee	30 June 2014
24	Dave Syers	CM	(England)	Leeds	30 November 1987 (aged 26)	–	–	–	–	10 January 2014	Doncaster Rovers	Undisclosed	30 June 2016
28	Gary McSheffrey	LW	(England)	Coventry	13 August 1982 (aged 31)	–	–	–	–	14 January 2014	Chesterfield	Free	30 June 2014
Forwards
8	Deon Burton	CF	(Jamaica)	Reading (England)	25 November 1976 (aged 37)	–	–	59	13	22 July 2013	Gillingham	Free	30 June 2014
12	Connor Jennings	CF	(England)	Manchester	29 October 1991 (aged 22)	20	1	–	–	12 January 2012	Stalybridge Celtic	£40,000	30 June 2014
16	Hakeeb Adelakun	RW/CF	(England)	London	11 June 1996 (aged 18)	2	0	–	–	1 July 2012	Academy	Trainee	30 June 2014
17	Matt Godden	CF/AM	(England)	Cantebury	29 July 1991 (aged 22)	16	0	–	–	1 July 2009	Academy	Trainee	30 June 2014
23	Jamie Wootton	CF/RW	(England)	Rotherham	2 October 1994 (aged 19)	1	0	–	–	1 July 2013	Academy	Trainee	30 June 2014
27	Paddy Madden	CF	(Republic of Ireland)	Dublin	4 March 1990 (aged 24)	–	–	1	0	10 January 2014	Yeovil Town	Undisclosed	30 June 2016
29	Sam Winnall	CF/RW	(England)	Wolverhampton	19 January 1991 (aged 23)	–	–	–	–	29 July 2013	Wolverhampton Wanderers	Free	30 June 2014
39	Paul Hayes	CF	(England)	Dagenham	20 September 1983 (aged 30)	266	74	–	–	4 January 2014	Brentford	Free	30 June 2014

=== Statistics ===
As of 6 May 2014

No.	Pos	Nat	Player	Total		League Two		FA Cup		League Cup		League Trophy	
No.	Pos	Nat	Player	Apps	Goals	Apps	Goals	Apps	Goals	Apps	Goals	Apps	Goals
1	GK	(England) ENG	Sam Slocombe	50	0	46	0	2	0	1	0	1	0
2	DF	(Wales) WAL	Christian Ribeiro	25	0	19+2	0	1+1	0	1	0	1	0
3	DF	(England) ENG	Andy Dawson	22	0	18	0	2	0	1	0	1	0
4	MF	(England) ENG	Sean McAllister	43	0	37+2	0	2	0	1	0	1	0
5	DF	(England) ENG	David Mirfin	49	2	45	2	2	0	1	0	1	0
6	DF	(Republic of Ireland) IRL	Niall Canavan	47	4	44	4	1	0	1	0	1	0
7	MF	(England) ENG	Matt Sparrow	27	3	19+6	3	0	0	1	0	1	0
8	FW	(Jamaica) JAM	Deon Burton	32	6	19+10	6	1+1	0	1	0	0	0
10	MF	(Netherlands) NED	Etiënne Esajas	15	2	8+5	2	1	0	0	0	1	0
11	MF	(England) ENG	Andy Welsh	4	1	2+2	0	0	0	0	0+1	0	0
13	GK	(England) ENG	James Severn	0	0	0	0	0	0	0	0	0	0
14	MF	(England) ENG	Terry Hawkridge	48	2	37+8	1	2	1	1	0	0	0
15	DF	(England) ENG	Luke Waterfall	10	1	2+7	1	1	0	0	0	0	0
16	FW	(England) ENG	Hakeeb Adelakun	29	2	8+20	2	0+1	0	0	0	0	0
17	FW	(England) ENG	Matt Godden	5	0	0+4	0	0	0	0+1	0	0	0
18	DF	(Republic of Ireland) IRL	Eddie Nolan	39	0	36+2	0	0	0	0	0	1	0
19	MF	(Republic of Ireland) IRL	Michael Collins	20	0	9+8	0	2	0	1	0	0	0
21	DF	(England) ENG	George Grayson	0	0	0	0	0	0	0	0	0	0
24	MF	(England) ENG	David Syers	35	10	35	10	0	0	0	0	0	0
27	FW	(Republic of Ireland) IRL	Paddy Madden	21	5	17+4	5	0	0	0	0	0	0
28	MF	(England) ENG	Gary McSheffrey	13	0	9+4	0	0	0	0	0	0	0
29	FW	(England) ENG	Sam Winnall	49	23	43+2	23	2	0	1	0	1	0
30	DF	(England) ENG	Marcus Williams	26	0	25+1	0	0	0	0	0	0	0
39	FW	(England) ENG	Paul Hayes	16	4	5+11	4	0	0	0	0	0	0
Players currently out on loan:
12	FW	(England) ENG	Connor Jennings (at Grimsby Town)	0	0	0	0	0	0	0	0	0	0
20	DF	(England) ENG	Callum Howe (at Gainsborough Trinity)	0	0	0	0	0	0	0	0	0	0
22	MF	(England) ENG	Luke Hornsey (at Frickley Athletic)	0	0	0	0	0	0	0	0	0	0
23	FW	(England) ENG	Jamie Wootton (at Gainsborough Trinity)	1	0	0+1	0	0	0	0	0	0	0
25	DF	(England) ENG	Andrew Boyce (at Grimsby Town)	2	0	0+2	0	0	0	0	0	0	0
Players who have left the club:
9	FW	(Scotland) SCO	Chris Iwelumo	14	2	4+8	2	0+1	0	0+1	0	0	0
24	FW	(England) ENG	Jordan Clark (on loan from Barnsley)	1	0	0+1	0	0	0	0	0	0	0
26	DF	(Republic of Ireland) IRL	Cliff Byrne (on loan from Oldham Athletic)	10	0	6+3	0	1	0	0	0	0	0
26	FW	(England) ENG	James Alabi (on loan from Stoke City)	1	0	0+1	0	0	0	0	0	0	0
27	FW	(England) ENG	Reuben Noble-Lazarus (on loan from Barnsley)	4	0	2+2	0	0	0	0	0	0	0
28	FW	(England) ENG	Jimmy Spencer (on loan from Huddersfield Town)	17	1	6+8	1	2	0	0	0	1	0

==== Captains ====
No.	P	Name	Country	No. games	Notes
1	GK	Sam Slocombe	(England)	28	
3	DF	Andy Dawson	(England)	14	
19	MF	Michael Collins	(Republic of Ireland)	7	Team captain

Source: Competitive match reports.
Competitive matches only
Matches started as captain only
Country: FIFA nationality; No.: Squad number; P: Position; Name: Player name; No. Games: Number of games started as captain.

==== Goalscorers ====
Rank	No.	Pos.	Name	League Two	FA Cup	League Cup	League Trophy	Total
1	29	FW	Sam Winnall	23	0	0	0	23
2	24	MF	Dave Syers	10	0	0	0	10
3	8	FW	Deon Burton	6	0	0	0	6
4	27	FW	Paddy Madden	5	0	0	0	5
5	6	DF	Niall Canavan	4	0	0	0	4
5	39	FW	Paul Hayes	4	0	0	0	4
7	7	MF	Matt Sparrow	3	0	0	0	3
8	5	DF	David Mirfin	2	0	0	0	2
8	~~9~~	FW	Chris Iwelumo	2	0	0	0	2
8	10	MF	Etiënne Esajas	2	0	0	0	2
8	14	MF	Terry Hawkridge	1	1	0	0	2
8	16	FW	Hakeeb Adelakun	2	0	0	0	2
8	Own Goals			2	0	0	0	2
13	15	DF	Luke Waterfall	1	0	0	0	1
13	~~28~~	FW	Jimmy Spencer	1	0	0	0	1
Total				67	1	0	0	68

==== Disciplinary record ====
No.	Pos.	Name	League Two		FA Cup		League Cup		League Trophy		Total	
No.	Pos.	Name	Yellow card	Red card	Yellow card	Red card	Yellow card	Red card	Yellow card	Red card	Yellow card	Red card
1	GK	Sam Slocombe	2	0	0	0	0	0	0	0	2	0
2	DF	Christian Ribeiro	3	0	0	0	0	0	0	0	3	0
3	DF	Andy Dawson	4	0	0	0	0	0	0	0	4	0
4	MF	Sean McAllister	7	0	0	0	0	0	0	0	7	0
5	DF	David Mirfin	2	0	0	0	0	0	0	0	2	0
6	DF	Niall Canavan	6	0	0	0	1	0	0	0	7	0
7	MF	Matt Sparrow	3	0	0	0	0	0	0	0	3	0
8	FW	Deon Burton	3	0	0	0	0	0	0	0	3	0
10	MF	Etiënne Esajas	0	0	1	0	0	0	0	0	1	0
14	MF	Terry Hawkridge	3	0	1	0	0	0	0	0	4	0
18	DF	Eddie Nolan	3	1	0	0	0	0	0	0	3	1
19	MF	Michael Collins	1	0	0	0	0	0	0	0	1	0
24	MF	David Syers	2	0	0	0	0	0	0	0	2	0
~~26~~	DF	Cliff Byrne	2	0	0	0	0	0	0	0	2	0
27	FW	Paddy Madden	1	0	0	0	0	0	0	0	1	0
28	MF	Gary McSheffrey	1	0	0	0	0	0	0	0	1	0
29	FW	Sam Winnall	3	1	0	0	0	0	0	0	3	1
30	DF	Marcus Williams	2	0	0	0	0	0	0	0	2	0
39	FW	Paul Hayes	1	0	0	0	0	0	0	0	1	0
Total			50	2	2	0	0	0	1	0	53	2

==== Suspensions served ====
Date	Matches Missed	Player	Reason	Opponents Missed
3 August 2013	1	Eddie Nolan	(yellow card) (yellow-red card) vs Mansfield Town	Barnsley (LC)
26 December 2013	1	Sam Winnall	(yellow card) (yellow-red card) vs Bury	Oxford (A)

=== Contracts ===
No.	Pos.	Nat.	Name	Age	Status	Contract length	Expiry date	Source
19	MF	(Republic of Ireland) (England)	Michael Collins	27	Signed	1 year	June 2014	
17	FW	(England)	Matt Godden	21	Signed	1 year	June 2014	
18	DF	(Republic of Ireland)	Eddie Nolan	24	Signed	1 year	June 2014	
7	MF	(England)	Jimmy Ryan	24	Rejected	1 year	June 2014	
13	GK	(England)	James Severn	21	Signed	1 year	June 2014	
1	GK	(England)	Sam Slocombe	25	Extended	1 year	June 2015	

== Transfers ==
=== In ===
No.	Pos.	Nat.	Name	Age	EU	Moving from	Type	Transfer window	Ends	Transfer fee	Source
3	DF	(England)	Andy Dawson	34	EU	Hull City	Free Transfer	Summer	2014	Free	
9	FW	(Scotland)	Chris Iwelumo	34	EU	Watford	Free Transfer	Summer	2014	Free	
14	MF	(England)	Terry Hawkridge	23	EU	Gainsborough Trinity	Bosman Transfer	Summer	2014	Undisclosed	
15	DF	(England)	Luke Waterfall	22	EU	Gainsborough Trinity	Bosman Transfer	Summer	2014	Undisclosed	
11	MF	(England)	Andy Welsh	29	EU	Carlisle United	Free Transfer	Summer	2014	Free	
7	MF	(England)	Matt Sparrow	31	EU	Crawley Town	Free Transfer	Summer	2015	Free	
10	MF	(Netherlands)	Etiënne Esajas	28	EU	Swindon Town	Free Transfer	Summer	2014	Free	
4	MF	(England)	Sean McAllister	25	EU	Cowdenbeath (Scotland)	Free Transfer	Summer	2014	Free	
8	FW	(Jamaica) (England)	Deon Burton	36	EU	Gillingham	Free Transfer	Summer	2014	Free	
29	FW	(England)	Sam Winnall	22	EU	Wolverhampton Wanderers	Free Transfer	Summer	2014	Free	
39	FW	(England)	Paul Hayes	30	EU	Brentford	Free Transfer	Winter	2014	Free	
25	DF	(England)	Andrew Boyce	24	EU	Lincoln City	Transfer	Winter	2015	Undisclosed	
27	FW	(Republic of Ireland)	Paddy Madden	23	EU	Yeovil Town	Transfer	Winter	2016	Undisclosed	
24	MF	(England)	Dave Syers	26	EU	Doncaster Rovers	Transfer	Winter	2016	Undisclosed	
30	DF	(England)	Marcus Williams	27	EU	Sheffield United	Free Transfer	Winter	2015	Free	
28	MF	(England)	Gary McSheffrey	31	EU	Chesterfield	Free Transfer	Winter	2014	Free	

=== Loans in ===
No.	Pos.	Name	Country	Age	Loan club	Started	Ended	Start source	End source
24	FW	Jordan Clark	(England)	19	Barnsley	2 August	11 September		
28	FW	Jimmy Spencer	(England)	22	Huddersfield Town	22 August	5 January		
26	DF	Cliff Byrne	(Republic of Ireland)	32	Oldham Athletic	12 September	14 December		
24	MF	David Syers	(England)	26	Doncaster Rovers	5 October	3 January		
27	FW	Reuben Noble-Lazarus	(England)	33	Barnsley	12 November	1 January		
25	DF	Andrew Boyce	(England)	24	Lincoln City	15 November	6 January		
30	DF	Marcus Williams	(England)	27	Sheffield United	28 November	1 January		
26	FW	James Alabi	(England)	19	Stoke City	1 March	7 April		

Sources: For loan start source see "Start source". For loan end source see "End source".
EU = if holds or not a European Union passport; Country: when 2 flags, 1st flag = country that plays for internationally, 2nd flag = country of birth; No. = number on jersey; P = Position (for position name, pause mouse pointer on abbreviation); Name = Name on jersey (for more extensive name, pause mouse pointer on name); In/Out = In: The player came in on loan, Out: The player went out on loan; Loan club = the club that the player moved on loan to or the club that the player came from on loan; Started = the date when the player's loan started; Ended = the date when the player's loan ended.

=== Out ===
No.	Pos.	Name	Country	Age	Type	Moving to	Transfer window	Transfer fee	Apps	Goals	Source
11	MF	Andy Barcham	(England)	26	Contract Ended	Portsmouth	Summer	Free	84	9	
14	MF	Robbie Gibbons	(Republic of Ireland)	21	Contract Ended	Free agent	Summer	Free	13	0	
22	FW	Karl Hawley	(England)	31	Contract Ended	Torquay United	Summer	Free	40	11	
8	MF	Damien Mozika	(France)	26	Contract Ended	Free agent	Summer	Free	31	4	
6	DF	Paul Reid	(England)	31	Contract Ended	Free agent	Summer	Free	77	2	
9	FW	Akpo Sodje	(England)	33	Contract Ended	Tranmere Rovers	Summer	Free	16	6	
4	MF	Josh Walker	(England)	24	Contract Ended	Free agent	Summer	Free	44	3	
21	DF	Tom Newey	(England)	30	Contract Ended	Oxford United	Summer	Free	49	0	
7	MF	Jimmy Ryan	(Republic of Ireland) (England)	24	Contract Ended	Chesterfield	Summer	Free	76	4	
10	FW	Mike Grella	(United States)	26	Contract Terminated	Free agent	Summer	Free	29	2	
3	DF	Callum Kennedy	(England)	23	Contract Terminated	AFC Wimbledon	Summer	Free	18	0	
16	MF	Mark Duffy	(England)	27	Transfer	Doncaster Rovers	Summer	Undisclosed	112	10	
9	FW	Chris Iwelumo	(Scotland)	35	Contract Terminated	St Johnstone (Scotland)	Winter	Free	14	2	

EU = if holds or not a European Union passport; Country: when 2 flags, 1st flag = country that plays for internationally, 2nd flag = country of birth; N = number on jersey; P = Position (for position name, pause mouse pointer on abbreviation); Name = Name on jersey (for more extensive name, pause mouse pointer on name); Age = age on the day of the signing; Moving from = only indicate the club the player was playing before start playing for this club in this season, for the type of the moving see Status column; Moving to = only indicates the club the player is going to play next, for the type of the moving see Status column; Ends = when the player's current contract ends; n/a = Not applicable; Apps = Total number of competitive appearances (including substitute appearances) at the club prior to departure; Goals = Total number of competitive goals scored at the club prior to departure.

=== Loans out ===
No.	Pos.	Name	Country	Age	Loan club	Started	Ended	Start source	End source
12	FW	Connor Jennings	(England)	22	Macclesfield Town	24 July	6 January		
17	FW	Matt Godden	(England)	22	Dartford	8 October	21 December		
23	FW	Jamie Wootton	(England)	19	Gainsborough Trinity	15 November	27 December		
20	DF	Callum Howe	(England)	20	Gainsborough Trinity	December	31 May		
23	FW	Jamie Wootton	(England)	19	Gainsborough Trinity	3 January	31 May		
17	FW	Matt Godden	(England)	22	Tamworth	20 February	11 April		
19	MF	Michael Collins	(Republic of Ireland)	27	AFC Wimbledon	20 February	3 April		
12	FW	Connor Jennings	(England)	22	Grimsby Town	28 February 2014	31 May		
25	DF	Andrew Boyce	(England)	24	Grimsby Town	10 March 2014	31 May		
22	DF	Luke Hornsey	(England)	19	Frickley Athletic	21 March	31 May		

Sources: For loan start source see "Start source". For loan end source see "End source".
EU = if holds or not a European Union passport; Country: when 2 flags, 1st flag = country that plays for internationally, 2nd flag = country of birth; No. = number on jersey; P = Position (for position name, pause mouse pointer on abbreviation); Name = Name on jersey (for more extensive name, pause mouse pointer on name); In/Out = In: The player came in on loan, Out: The player went out on loan; Loan club = the club that the player moved on loan to or the club that the player came from on loan; Started = the date when the player's loan started; Ended = the date when the player's loan ended.

== Overall summary ==
=== Summary ===
Games played	50 (46 League Two, 2 FA Cup, 1 League Cup, 1 League Trophy)
Games won	20 (20 League Two, 0 FA Cup, 0 League Cup, 0 League Trophy)
Games drawn	23 (20 League Two, 1 FA Cup, 1 League Cup, 1 League Trophy)
Games lost	6 (5 League Two, 1 FA Cup, 0 League Cup, 0 League Trophy)
Goals scored	68 (67 League Two, 1 FA Cup, 0 League Cup, 0 League Trophy)
Goals conceded	44 (42 League Two, 2 FA Cup, 0 League Cup, 0 League Trophy)
Goal difference	23
Clean sheets	24 (21 League Two, 1 FA Cup, 1 League Cup, 1 League Trophy)
Yellow cards	53 (50 League Two, 2 FA Cup, 0 League Cup, 1 League Trophy)
Red cards	2 (2 League Two, 0 FA Cup, 0 League Cup, 0 League Trophy)
Worst discipline	Sam Winnall (3 (yellow card) , 1 (red card)
Best result	5–1 vs Portsmouth
Worst result	0–4 vs Exeter City
Most appearances	Sam Slocombe (50)
Top scorer	Sam Winnall (23)
Points	81

=== Score overview ===
Opposition	Home score	Away score	Double
Accrington Stanley	0–2	3–2	No
AFC Wimbledon	0–0	2–3	No
Bristol Rovers	1–1	0–0	No
Burton Albion	1–0	2–2	No
Bury	2–2	2–2	No
Cheltenham Town	2–0	2–0	Yes
Chesterfield	1–1	1–1	No
Dagenham & Redbridge	1–1	3–3	No
Exeter City	0–4	0–2	No
Fleetwood Town	0–0	1–0	No
Hartlepool United	1–0	0–0	No
Mansfield Town	2–0	2–0	Yes
Morecambe	2–0	1–1	No
Newport County	1–1	2–2	No
Northampton Town	1–1	1–1	No
Oxford United	1–0	2–0	Yes
Plymouth Argyle	1–0	2–0	Yes
Portsmouth	5–1	2–1	Yes
Rochdale	3–0	4–0	Yes
Southend United	2–2	1–0	No
Torquay United	3–1	1–0	Yes
Wycombe Wanderers	0–0	1–1	No
York City	2–2	1–4	No
