= Andrew Boyce =

English footballer (born 1989)

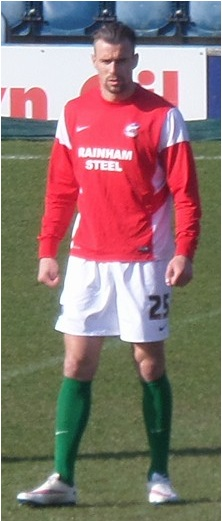

Personal information
- Full name: Andrew Thomas Boyce
- Date of birth: 5 November 1989 (age 37)
- Place of birth: Doncaster, England
- Height: 1.94 m (6 ft 4 1/2 in)
- Positions: Centre-back; right-back

Team information
- Current team: Worksop Town

Youth career
- 2006–2008: Doncaster Rovers

Senior career*
Years	Team	Apps	(Gls)
2008–2009	Doncaster Rovers	0	(0)
2008–2009	→ Worksop Town (loan)		
2009	King's Lynn	18	(0)
2009–2012	Gainsborough Trinity	71	(8)
2012–2014	Lincoln City	60	(5)
2013	→ Scunthorpe United (loan)	2	(0)
2014–2016	Scunthorpe United	29	(1)
2014	→ Grimsby Town (loan)	13	(0)
2014	→ Grimsby Town (loan)	6	(0)
2015	→ Hartlepool United (loan)	8	(0)
2016	→ Notts County (loan)	3	(0)
2016–2017	Grimsby Town	17	(1)
2017–2022	Eastleigh	196	(7)
2022–2026	Scunthorpe United	118	(6)
2026–	Worksop Town	0	(0)
- * Club domestic league appearances and goals as of 17:26, 3 May 2026 (UTC)

Andrew Thomas Boyce (born 5 November 1989) is an English footballer who plays as a defender for National League North side Worksop Town.

Having come through the youth academy at Doncaster Rovers, Boyce has played professionally for Lincoln City, Scunthorpe United, Notts County, Hartlepool United and Grimsby Town and semi-professionally for Gainsborough Trinity, Worksop Town, King's Lynn and Eastleigh.

== Club career ==
=== Early career ===
Boyce began his career as a trainee at the age of 16 with Doncaster Rovers Academy and was offered his first pro contract with Rovers in the summer of 2009. He spent most of the 2008–09 season on loan at Worksop Town. Competition for places at Doncaster Rovers was intense with the team competing in the Championship, which culminated in Boyce being released by Rovers in January 2009. He then went for a trial with Mansfield Town in April 2009, but due to financial constraints he wasn't offered a contract. Boyce dropped into non-league football with Northern Premier League side King's Lynn, where he went on to make 18 league appearances for the club. He left King's Lynn in December 2009, the football club folding due to financial difficulties. Within a few days, he signed for Gainsborough Trinity. He helped Trinity reach the Conference North play-off final in the 2011–12 season.

=== Lincoln City ===
He earned a move to Conference Premier side Lincoln City in May 2012. Due to both clubs being unable to agree a fee, later in the year a tribunal set a five-figure undisclosed fee, plus sell-on clause for the youngester's services. On 31 August 2013, he scored his first goal for the club, in the 2–1 away victory over Dartford; after his initial header was saved, the ball rebounded back to Boyce who then struck a right footed shot into the back of the net from 12 yards.

=== Scunthorpe United ===
After playing 60 matches for the Imps in the Conference Premier, Boyce moved on loan to Scunthorpe United on 15 November 2013. He made his Football League debut on 26 December 2013 in a 2–0 win over Morecambe. He moved permanently to Scunthorpe on 6 January 2014, penning an 18-month contract. Having played a part in Scunthorpes successful promotion bid to League One. On 10 March 2014, he joined Conference Premier side Grimsby Town on loan for the remainder of the 2013–14 season. Boyce made 13 appearances for Grimsby and participated in the 2013–14 play-off legs.

On 3 August 2014 Boyce returned to Grimsby, joining on an initial one-month loan for the start of the 2014–15 season. After three clean sheets out of the first five games, although Grimsby wanted a longer deal, Boyces loan was extended for a further month. An injury crisis to a number of first team players lead to Boyce being recalled to Scunthorpe only a week later. Upon his return to Scunthorpe in September, he opened the scoring in the 3–2 away defeat at Oldham; a header from the centre of the box to the top right corner, from a Gary McSheffrey corner.

On 20 August 2015, Boyce joined League Two side Hartlepool United on a month-long loan deal. After playing six games for Hartlepool, his loan was extended for another month with the club. On 10 March 2016 Boyce signed on loan for Notts County until the end of the current season. He was released after his contract had expired at the end of the season.

=== Grimsby Town ===
On 21 June 2016, Boyce signed a two-year contract with newly promoted League Two side Grimsby Town on a free transfer. He scored his first goal for Grimsby in a 2–1 loss at Wycombe Wanderers on 13 August 2016.

=== Eastleigh ===
On 17 July 2017, Boyce signed for National League side Eastleigh on a free transfer.

Boyce was released at the end of the 2021–22 season, he had made 196 appearances in the League during his time on the south coast.

=== Return to Scunthorpe ===
Boyce re-signed for Scunthorpe United on 8 June 2022, following the club's relegation from the Football League. On 8 May 2026, the club announced the player would be leaving in the summer when his contract expired.

=== Return to Worksop ===
On 19 June 2026, Boyce signed for National League North side Worksop Town, who he had previously spent time at on loan.

== Career statistics ==
As of match played on 3 May 2026

Appearances and goals by club, season and competition
Club	Season	League			FA Cup		League Cup		Other		Total	
Club	Season	Division	Apps	Goals	Apps	Goals	Apps	Goals	Apps	Goals	Apps	Goals
Doncaster Rovers	2008–09	Championship	0	0	0	0	0	0	—		0	0
Worksop Town (loan)	2008–09	NPL - Premier Division	0	0	0	0	—		0	0	0	0
King's Lynn	2008–09	Conference North	18	0	0	0	—		0	0	18	0
Gainsborough Trinity	2009–10	Conference North	0	0	0	0	—		0	0	0	0
Gainsborough Trinity	2010–11	Conference North	32	2	0	0	—		0	0	32	2
Gainsborough Trinity	2011–12	Conference North	39	6	1	0	—		0	0	40	6
Gainsborough Trinity	Total		71	8	1	0	—		0	0	72	8
Lincoln City	2012–13	Conference Premier	41	4	6	0	—		0	0	47	4
Lincoln City	2013–14	Conference Premier	19	1	4	1	—		0	0	23	2
Lincoln City	Total		60	5	10	1	—		0	0	70	6
Scunthorpe United (loan)	2013–14	League Two	2	0	—		—		0	0	2	0
Scunthorpe United	2014–15	League Two	29	1	4	0	0	0	1 (Note: Appearance(s) in Football League Trophy)	0	34	1
Scunthorpe United	2015–16	League One	0	0	1	0	0	0	0	0	1	0
Scunthorpe United	Total		31	1	5	0	0	0	1	0	37	1
Grimsby Town (loan)	2013–14	Conference Premier	13	0	—		—		2 (Note: Appearances in Conference Premier play-offs)	0	15	0
Grimsby Town (loan)	2014–15	Conference Premier	6	0	0	0	—		0	0	6	0
Grimsby Town (loan)	Total		19	0	0	0	—		2	0	21	0
Hartlepool United (loan)	2015–16	League Two	8	0	—		1	0	0	0	9	0
Notts County (loan)	2015–16	League Two	3	0	—		0	0	0	0	3	0
Grimsby Town	2016–17	League Two	17	1	0	0	1	0	2 (Note: Appearances in EFL Trophy)	1	20	2
Eastleigh	2017–18	National League	38	0	1	0	—		1 (Note: Appearance(s) in FA Trophy)	0	40	0
Eastleigh	2018–19	National League	39	3	1	0	0	0	3 (Note: One appearance in FA Trophy and two appearances in National League play-offs)	0	43	3
Eastleigh	2019–20	National League	34	1	6	0	0	0	1	0	41	1
Eastleigh	2020–21	National League	43	2	2	0	0	0	1	1	46	3
Eastleigh	2021–22	National League	42	1	2	0	0	0	2	1	46	2
Eastleigh	Total		196	7	12	0	0	0	8	2	216	9
Scunthorpe United	2022–23	National League	38	3	1	0	0	0	0	0	39	3
Scunthorpe United	2023–24	National League North	31	1	1	0	0	0	1	0	33	1
Scunthorpe United	2024–25	National League North	36	2	3	0	0	0	2	0	41	2
Scunthorpe United	2025–26	National League	33	0	1	0	0	0	4	0	38	0
Scunthorpe United	Total		118	6	6	0	0	0	7	0	131	6
Career total			541	29	34	1	2	0	20	3	597	32

== Honours ==
Scunthorpe United

- Football League Two second-place promotion: 2013−14
- National League North play-offs: 2025

Individual

- Eastleigh Player of the Season: 2021–22
