= Niall Canavan =

Irish footballer

Personal information
- Full name: Niall David Stephen Canavan
- Date of birth: 11 April 1991 (age 35)
- Place of birth: Bramley, Leeds, England
- Height: 6 ft 4 in (1.93 m)
- Position: Defender

Team information
- Current team: Boston United

Youth career
- Bradford City
- 2004–2009: Scunthorpe United

Senior career*
| Years | Team | Apps | (Gls) |
| 2009–2016 | Scunthorpe United | 154 | (15) |
| 2011 | → Shrewsbury Town (loan) | 3 | (0) |
| 2016 | → Rochdale (loan) | 11 | (1) |
| 2016–2018 | Rochdale | 28 | (2) |
| 2018–2021 | Plymouth Argyle | 78 | (5) |
| 2021–2022 | Bradford City | 33 | (1) |
| 2022–2026 | Barrow | 166 | (7) |
| 2026– | Boston United | 13 | (0) |

International career^{‡}
| 2011–2012 | Republic of Ireland U21 | 7 | (0) |
- * Club domestic league appearances and goals as of 17:16, 1 August 2026 (UTC) ‡ National team caps and goals as of 23:00, 31 January 2022 (UTC)

Niall David Stephen Canavan (born 11 April 1991) is a professional footballer who plays as a defender for National League club Boston United. Born in England, he has represented the Republic of Ireland at youth level.

== Career ==
Born in Bramley, West Yorkshire, Canavan played with the academy of Bradford City until he was 12.

Canavan signed his first professional contract in April 2009 for Scunthorpe United. He made his first team debut on 22 August 2009 in a 4–0 defeat at Sheffield Wednesday, replacing Robert Jones on 28 minutes. Three days later he scored his first goal, in a 2–1 League Cup win at Swansea City. He attended St. Mary's Menston. He is a first team regular playing in both League and Cup matches. He has most notably played against Manchester United and Manchester City twice.

Canavan missed just one match in Scunthorpe's promotion winning season in 2013–14 and formed a defensive partnership with David Mirfin. As a consequence of this successful season, Canavan signed a new 2-year contract on 29 May 2014.

On 15 February 2016, Canavan joined Rochdale on an emergency loan, and at the end of the season he joined the club on a two-year contract.

He was released by Rochdale at the end of the 2017–18 season, after which he joined Plymouth Argyle on a free transfer.

He re-joined Bradford City in January 2021.

He moved from Bradford to fellow League Two side Barrow in January 2022.

On 1 August 2026, Canavan joined National League club Boston United on an initial one-year deal.

== International career ==
Although born in Leeds, Canavan carries an Irish passport and was called up by the FAI to the U21 squad in March 2011. In March 2011 he made his debut appearance for the Irish national Under-21 team.

== Personal life ==
In September 2019, it was revealed that Canavan had, earlier in the year, been diagnosed with Type 1 diabetes.

== Career statistics ==
=== Club ===
As of end of 2025–26 season

Appearances and goals by club, season and competition
| Club | Season | League | | | FA Cup | | League Cup | | Other | | Total | |
| Club | Season | Division | Apps | Goals | Apps | Goals | Apps | Goals | Apps | Goals | Apps | Goals |
|---|---|---|---|---|---|---|---|---|---|---|---|---|
| Scunthorpe United | 2009–10 | Championship | 7 | 1 | 0 | 0 | 3 | 1 | 0 | 0 | 10 | 2 |
| Scunthorpe United | 2010–11 | Championship | 8 | 0 | 0 | 0 | 2 | 0 | 0 | 0 | 10 | 0 |
| Scunthorpe United | 2011–12 | League One | 12 | 1 | 2 | 0 | 1 | 0 | 0 | 0 | 15 | 1 |
| Scunthorpe United | 2012–13 | League One | 40 | 6 | 0 | 0 | 1 | 0 | 1 (Note: Appearances in the Football League Trophy) | 0 | 42 | 6 |
| Scunthorpe United | 2013–14 | League Two | 45 | 4 | 1 | 0 | 1 | 0 | 1 | 0 | 48 | 4 |
| Scunthorpe United | 2014–15 | League One | 32 | 3 | 1 | 0 | 2 | 0 | 1 | 0 | 36 | 3 |
| Scunthorpe United | 2015–16 | League One | 10 | 0 | 2 | 0 | 0 | 0 | 0 | 0 | 12 | 0 |
| Scunthorpe United | Total | | 154 | 15 | 6 | 0 | 10 | 1 | 3 | 0 | 173 | 16 |
| Shrewsbury Town (loan) | 2010–11 | League Two | 3 | 0 | 0 | 0 | 0 | 0 | 1 (Note: Appearance in the League Two play-offs) | 0 | 4 | 0 |
| Rochdale (loan) | 2015–16 | League One | 11 | 1 | 0 | 0 | 0 | 0 | 0 | 0 | 11 | 1 |
| Rochdale | 2016–17 | League One | 25 | 2 | 3 | 0 | 2 | 0 | 3 | 0 | 33 | 2 |
| Rochdale | 2017–18 | League One | 3 | 0 | 0 | 0 | 2 | 0 | 1 | 0 | 5 | 0 |
| Rochdale | Total | | 28 | 2 | 3 | 0 | 4 | 0 | 4 | 0 | 39 | 2 |
| Plymouth Argyle | 2018–19 | League One | 33 | 2 | 2 | 0 | 1 | 0 | 2 | 0 | 38 | 2 |
| Plymouth Argyle | 2019–20 | League Two | 33 | 2 | 2 | 0 | 2 | 0 | 2 | 0 | 39 | 2 |
| Plymouth Argyle | 2020–21 | League One | 12 | 1 | 1 | 0 | 0 | 0 | 2 | 0 | 15 | 1 |
| Plymouth Argyle | Total | | 78 | 5 | 5 | 0 | 3 | 0 | 6 | 0 | 92 | 5 |
| Bradford City | 2020–21 | League Two | 16 | 0 | 0 | 0 | 0 | 0 | 0 | 0 | 16 | 0 |
| Bradford City | 2021–22 | League Two | 17 | 1 | 2 | 0 | 1 | 0 | 0 | 0 | 20 | 1 |
| Bradford City | Total | | 33 | 1 | 2 | 0 | 1 | 0 | 0 | 0 | 36 | 1 |
| Barrow | 2021–22 | League Two | 18 | 0 | 0 | 0 | 0 | 0 | 0 | 0 | 18 | 0 |
| Barrow | 2022–23 | League Two | 46 | 2 | 1 | 0 | 2 | 0 | 1 | 0 | 50 | 2 |
| Barrow | 2023–24 | League Two | 39 | 3 | 2 | 0 | 1 | 0 | 2 | 0 | 44 | 3 |
| Barrow | 2024–25 | League Two | 36 | 0 | 1 | 0 | 2 | 0 | 2 | 0 | 41 | 0 |
| Barrow | 2025–26 | League Two | 27 | 2 | 1 | 1 | 1 | 0 | 0 | 0 | 29 | 3 |
| Total | | | 166 | 7 | 5 | 1 | 6 | 0 | 5 | 0 | 182 | 8 |
| Career total | | | 473 | 31 | 21 | 1 | 24 | 1 | 19 | 0 | 537 | 33 |
