= Terry Hawkridge =

English footballer (born 1990)

Personal information
- Full name: Terry Paul Hawkridge
- Date of birth: 23 February 1990 (age 36)
- Place of birth: Nottingham, England
- Position: Winger

Team information
- Current team: Eastwood

Youth career
- Barnsley
- Tranmere Rovers

Senior career*
Years	Team	Apps	(Gls)
2007–2009	Carlton Town		
2009–2010	Hucknall Town		
2010–2012	Carlton Town		
2012–2013	Gainsborough Trinity	37	(6)
2013–2016	Scunthorpe United	56	(1)
2015	→ Mansfield Town (loan)	5	(0)
2015–2016	→ Lincoln City (loan)	21	(1)
2016–2017	Lincoln City	49	(3)
2017–2019	Notts County	35	(3)
2019–2020	Solihull Moors	42	(2)
2020–2021	Boston United	13	(1)
2021–2022	Basford United	18	(0)
2022	Matlock Town	14	(0)
2022–2024	Worksop Town	87	(3)
2024–	Eastwood	0	(0)
- * Club domestic league appearances and goals as of 13:20, 15 November 2024 (UTC)

Terry Paul Hawkridge (born 23 February 1990) is an English professional footballer who plays as a winger for club Eastwood.

He previously played in the Football League for Scunthorpe United, Mansfield Town and Notts County, and in non-league football for Carlton Town, Hucknall Town, Gainsborough Trinity, Lincoln City, Solihull Moors, Boston United, Basford United, Matlock Town and Worksop Town.

== Career ==
=== Non-league ===
Hawkridge was born in Nottingham, Nottinghamshire. After playing youth football for Barnsley and Tranmere Rovers, he signed a one-year senior contract with Carlton Town in August 2008. He was released a year later, after appearing just twice with the first team, and subsequently signed for Hucknall Town. However, in September 2010, Hawkridge returned to Carlton Town, after he was deemed surplus to requirements at Hucknall.

Hawkridge signed for Gainsborough Trinity of the Conference North in August 2012. He scored 6 goals from in 37 league matches, and was an instrumental part of the team.

=== Scunthorpe United ===
On 4 June 2013, Hawkridge signed a one-year deal with League Two club Scunthorpe United for an undisclosed fee, along with Trinity teammate Luke Waterfall who had both followed chairman Peter Swann to the club. He made his professional debut on 3 August, providing assists for both goals in a 2–0 home win against Mansfield Town.

=== Lincoln City ===
Hawkridge joined Lincoln City on 1 September 2015 on loan until the following January. This was then followed by an 18-month contract to take him to the end of the 2016–17 season. In the last game of that season, and his last game for Lincoln, Hawkridge scored both goals as Lincoln won the 2016–17 National League title.

=== Notts County ===
On 18 May 2017, Hawkridge signed a two-year contract with Notts County. His contract was terminated in January 2019.

=== Solihull Moors ===
Hawkridge next signed for Solihull Moors.

=== Later career ===
After 18 months with Solihull Moors, Hawkridge signed for National League North club Boston United on 1 September 2020. He moved on to Basford United of the Northern Premier League Premier Division a year later.

On 17 January 2022, he joined Northern Premier League Premier Division rivals Matlock Town for an undisclosed fee along with Marcus Marshall.

Hawkridge joined Northern Premier League Division One East club Worksop Town on 11 June 2022.

On 14 November 2024, Hawkridge signed for United Counties League Premier Division North club Eastwood for an undisclosed fee.

== Career statistics ==
As of match played 2 November 2024

Appearances and goals by club, season and competition
Club	Season	League			FA Cup		League Cup		Other		Total	
Club	Season	Division	Apps	Goals	Apps	Goals	Apps	Goals	Apps	Goals	Apps	Goals
Scunthorpe United	2013–14	League Two	45	1	2	1	1	0	1 (Note: Appearances in Football League Trophy)	0	49	2
Scunthorpe United	2014–15	League One	11	0	3	0	1	0	2	0	17	0
Scunthorpe United	2015–16	League One	0	0	—		0	0	—		0	0
Scunthorpe United	Total		56	1	5	1	2	0	3	0	66	2
Mansfield Town (loan)	2014–15	League Two	5	0	—		—		—		5	0
Lincoln City	2015–16	National League	38	1	3	0	—		0	0	41	1
Lincoln City	2016–17	National League	32	3	9	1	—		5 (Note: Appearances in FA Trophy)	2	46	6
Lincoln City	Total		70	4	12	1	—		5	2	87	7
Notts County	2017–18	League Two	31	3	5	0	1	0	0	0	37	3
Notts County	2018–19	League Two	4	0	0	0	1	0	2 (Note: Appearances in EFL Trophy)	0	7	0
Notts County	Total		35	3	5	0	2	0	2	0	44	3
Solihull Moors	2018–19	National League	11	0	—		—		5 (Note: Four appearances and one goal in FA Trophy, one in National League play-offs)	1	16	1
Solihull Moors	2019–20	National League	31	2	1	0	—		3 (Note: One appearance in FA Trophy, two in Scottish Challenge Cup)	0	39	2
Solihull Moors	Total		42	2	1	0	—		8	1	51	3
Boston United	2020–21	National League North	12	1	1	1	—		3	0	16	2
Boston United	2021–22	National League North	1	0	—		—		—		1	0
Boston United	Total		13	1	1	1	—		3	0	17	2
Basford United	2021–22	Northern Premier League (NPL); Premier Division	18	0	3	0	—		2	0	23	0
Matlock Town	2021–22	NPL Premier Division	14	0	—		—		—		14	0
Worksop Town	2022–23	NPL Division One East	36	3	3	0	—		5 (Note: Three appearances in FA Trophy, two in Sheffield & Hallamshire Senior Cup)	0	44	3
Worksop Town	2023–24	NPL Premier Division	37	0	6	2	—		7 (Note: One appearance in FA Trophy, five appearances and one goal in Sheffield & Hallamshire Senior Cup, one appearance in Northern Premier League Premier Division play-offs)	1	50	3
Worksop Town	2024–25	NPL Premier Division	14	0	4	0	—		2 (Note: One appearance in FA Trophy, one in Sheffield & Hallamshire Senior Cup)	0	20	0
Worksop Town	Total		87	3	13	2	—		14	1	114	6
Career total			340	14	40	5	4	0	37	4	421	23

== Honours ==
=== Club ===
Lincoln City

- National League: 2016–17

Worksop Town

- Sheffield & Hallamshire Senior Cup: 2023–24
