= Hakeeb Adelakun =

English footballer (born 1996)

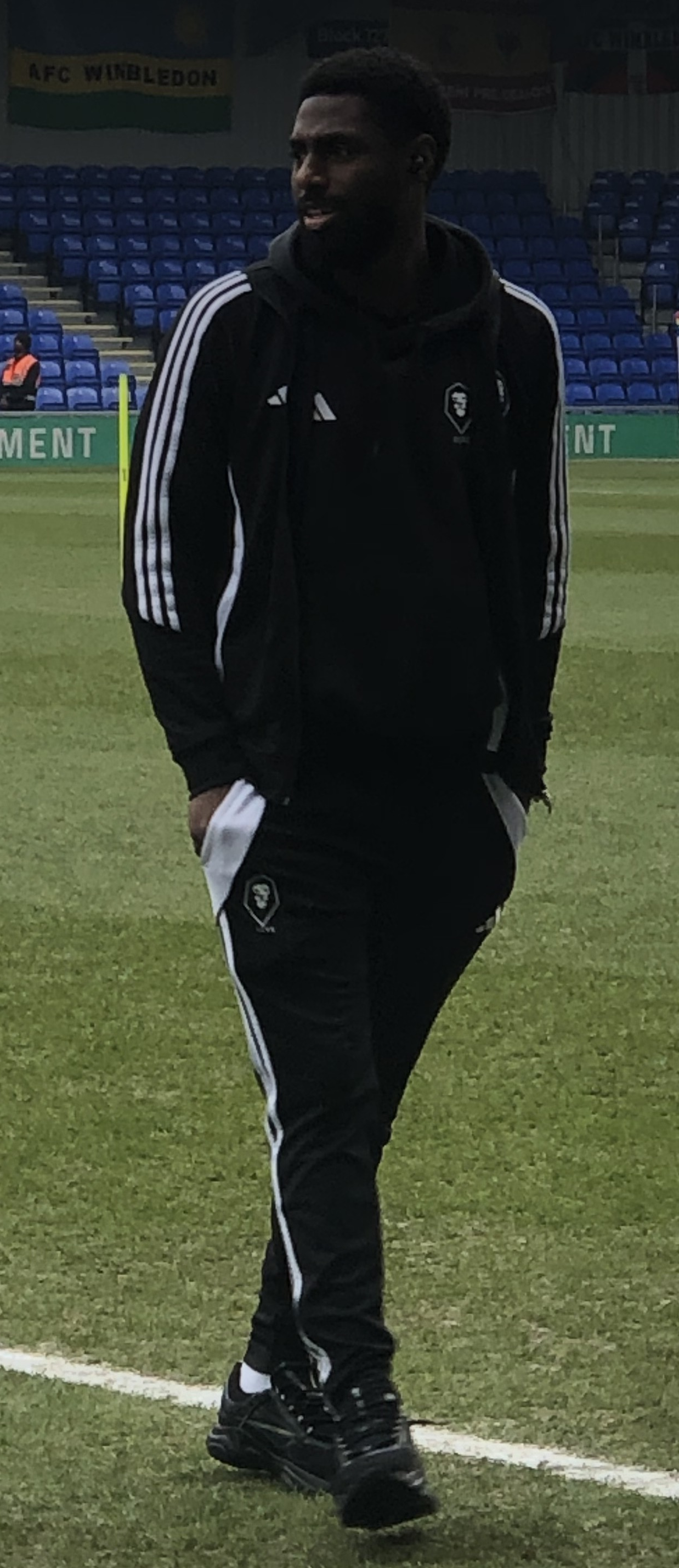
- Hakeeb Adelakun in 2025.

Personal information
- Full name: Hakeeb Adeola Abiola Ayinde Adelakun
- Date of birth: 11 June 1996 (age 30)
- Place of birth: Hackney, England
- Height: 6 ft 3 in (1.90 m)
- Positions: Forward; left midfielder

Team information
- Current team: Doncaster Rovers
- Number: 47

Youth career
- Crystal Palace
- West Ham United

Senior career*
Years	Team	Apps	(Gls)
2012–2018	Scunthorpe United	139	(16)
2018–2021	Bristol City	7	(0)
2020	→ Rotherham United (loan)	9	(0)
2020–2021	→ Hull City (loan)	14	(3)
2021–2024	Lincoln City	44	(5)
2022–2023	→ Gillingham (loan)	21	(0)
2024	→ Doncaster Rovers (loan)	19	(9)
2024–2025	Salford City	30	(13)
2025–2026	Cheltenham Town	11	(3)
2026–	Doncaster Rovers	25	(2)
- * Club domestic league appearances and goals as of 23 October 2026 (UTC)

Hakeeb Adeola Abiola Ayinde Adelakun (born 11 June 1996) is an English professional footballer who plays as a forward or left midfielder for EFL League One club Doncaster Rovers.

== Club career ==
=== Scunthorpe United ===
Adelakun played youth football with Crystal Palace and West Ham United, before joining Scunthorpe United. He made his professional debut as a 72nd-minute substitute for Adda Djeziri on 29 December 2012 in a 1–0 defeat against Tranmere Rovers at Prenton Park. He became the club's youngest player at the age of 16 years and 201 days. Adelakun's only other appearance of the season was on 27 April 2013 in a 3–1 win over Swindon Town, coming on for Anthony Forde in the match which relegated Scunthorpe to League Two.

He made 28 appearances and scored 2 goals in the 2013–14 season as Scunthorpe won promotion back to League One. On 30 November, he scored his first goal for Scunthorpe in a 3–1 home win over Torquay United, coming on for Reuben Noble-Lazarus in the 55th minute and scoring the last goal five minutes later. He was named EFL League One Player of the Month in December 2017.

=== Bristol City ===
In July 2018, following the expiration of his contract at Scunthorpe, Adelakun joined Championship club Bristol City, signing a three-year deal with the option of a further year.

Adelakun signed for Rotherham United until the end of the 2019–20 season on 9 January 2020.

On 24 September 2020, Adelakun signed for Hull City on a season-long loan deal. He would make his debut for Hull City on 26 September 2020 away to Northampton Town in a League One game. He would score his first goal for the club on 3 October 2020, in the 1–0 home win against Plymouth Argyle. On 4 January 2021, Adelakun was recalled by Bristol City, ending his loan deal at Hull.

On 14 May 2021, Adelakun was released from Bristol City following his contract expiring.

=== Lincoln City ===
On 26 July 2021. he would join Lincoln City on a long-term contract. He would make his Lincoln City debut on the opening day of the season, coming off the bench against Gillingham. His first goal for the club would come against Bradford City in the EFL Trophy on 31 August 2021. The club announced he would be released following the end of the 2023–24 season.

==== Gillingham (loan) ====
On 15 August 2022, he joined Gillingham on loan for the season. He made his debut the following day, in a 2–0 defeat to Harrogate Town.

==== Doncaster Rovers (loan) ====
On 22 January 2024, he joined Doncaster Rovers on loan for the season. His arrival coincided with an upturn in form for the club and having registered three goals and four assists across February, he was named the EFL League Two Player of the Month. He would miss the decisive penalty in the League Two play-offs semi final against Crewe Alexandra.

=== Salford City ===
On 30 August 2024, Adelakun joined League Two club Salford City on a one-year deal. He was offered a new contract at the end of the 2024–25 season.

=== Cheltenham Town ===
On 10 November 2025, Adelakun signed a short-term deal with Cheltenham Town.

=== Doncaster Rovers ===
On 6 January 2026, Adelukan signed a 18 month deal with Doncaster Rovers Adelukan made his second debut on 10 January 2026, against Southampton in the FA Cup He later scored his first league goal on 14 March 2026 against Blackpool, in a 2–1 home win

== Personal life ==
Adelakun is of Nigerian descent. His older brother Hakeem is a non-league player.

== Career statistics ==
As of match played 22 August 2026

Appearances and goals by club, season and competition
Club	Season	League			FA Cup		League Cup		Other		Total	
Club	Season	Division	Apps	Goals	Apps	Goals	Apps	Goals	Apps	Goals	Apps	Goals
Scunthorpe United	2012–13	League One	2	0	0	0	0	0	0	0	2	0
Scunthorpe United	2013–14	League Two	28	2	1	0	0	0	0	0	29	2
Scunthorpe United	2014–15	League One	32	6	5	0	1	0	2 (Note: Appearances in the Football League Trophy)	0	40	6
Scunthorpe United	2015–16	League One	21	2	3	1	1	0	1	0	26	3
Scunthorpe United	2016–17	League One	17	2	0	0	2	0	4	2	23	4
Scunthorpe United	2017–18	League One	39	4	3	1	2	0	5 (Note: Three appearances in the EFL Trophy, two in League One play-offs)	0	49	5
Scunthorpe United	Total		139	16	12	2	6	0	12	2	169	20
Bristol City	2018–19	Championship	5	0	0	0	0	0	—		5	0
Bristol City	2019–20	Championship	0	0	0	0	0	0	—		0	0
Bristol City	2020–21	Championship	2	0	2	0	0	0	—		4	0
Bristol City	Total		7	0	2	0	0	0	—		9	0
Rotherham United (loan)	2019–20	League One	9	0	—		—		—		9	0
Hull City (loan)	2020–21	League One	14	3	0	0	0	0	3	0	17	3
Lincoln City	2021–22	League One	23	2	2	0	1	0	3	1	29	3
Lincoln City	2022–23	League One	2	0	0	0	0	0	0	0	2	0
Lincoln City	2023–24	League One	19	3	1	0	1	0	4	1	25	4
Lincoln City	Total		44	5	3	0	2	0	7	2	56	7
Gillingham (loan)	2022–23	League Two	21	0	4	1	3	0	3	0	31	1
Doncaster Rovers (loan)	2023–24	League Two	19	9	0	0	0	0	2 (Note: Two appearances in League Two play-offs)	0	21	9
Salford City	2024–25	League Two	30	13	1	0	0	0	1	0	32	13
Cheltenham Town	2025–26	League Two	11	3	1	0	0	0	0	0	12	3
Doncaster Rovers	2025–26	League One	19	2	1	0	0	0	3	1	23	3
Doncaster Rovers	2026–27	League One	6	0	0	0	1	0	0	0	3	0
Doncaster Rovers	Total		25	2	1	0	1	0	3	1	30	3
Career total			315=9	51	24	3	12	0	31	5	386	59

== Honours ==
Hull City

- EFL League One: 2020–21

Individual

- EFL League Two Player of the Month: February 2024
