= Marcus Williams (footballer) =

English footballer (born 1986)

Personal information
- Full name: Marcus Vincent Williams
- Date of birth: 8 April 1986 (age 40)
- Place of birth: Doncaster, England
- Height: 5 ft 8 in (1.73 m)
- Position: Left back

Youth career
- –2003: Scunthorpe United

Senior career*
Years	Team	Apps	(Gls)
2003–2010	Scunthorpe United	166	(0)
2010–2012	Reading	3	(0)
2010	→ Peterborough United (loan)	3	(0)
2011	→ Scunthorpe United (loan)	5	(0)
2011	→ Sheffield United (loan)	11	(0)
2012–2014	Sheffield United	28	(0)
2013–2014	→ Scunthorpe United (loan)	5	(0)
2014–2015	Scunthorpe United	61	(0)
2015–2016	Kerala Blasters	5	(0)
2016–2018	Guiseley	38	(0)
2018	→ York City (loan)	1	(0)
Total		326	(0)
- * Club domestic league appearances and goals

Marcus Vincent Williams (born 8 April 1986) is an English professional footballer who plays as a left back.

Williams started his career at Scunthorpe United before moving to Reading and then to Sheffield United. Williams has signed for Scunthorpe on four occasions, twice on a permanent contract and twice on loan, as well as spending a short period on loan with Peterborough United.

== Career ==
=== Scunthorpe United ===
Williams was born in Doncaster, South Yorkshire. He began his career as a trainee with Scunthorpe United, signing a professional contract on 3 August 2005.

=== Reading ===
He signed for Championship club Reading on 11 May 2010 on a free transfer, signing a three-year contract after he turned down a new contract at Scunthorpe. He joined League One club Peterborough on 12 November 2010 on a one-month loan. On 24 March 2011, Williams rejoined Scunthorpe United on loan until the end of the 2010–11 season.

=== Sheffield United ===
He joined League One club Sheffield United on 13 September 2011 on a 28-day emergency loan as cover for the injured Lecsinel Jean-François. He made his debut the same day in a 3–0 home loss to Huddersfield Town. The loan was extended for further two months to keep him at United until 13 December 2011.

Williams joined United permanently on 1 January 2012, signing a two-and-a-half-year contract on a free transfer. Following his transfer, however, Williams rarely featured for the Blades and spent much of the following eighteen months sat on the side lines. With the arrival of new manager David Weir, Williams was restored to the starting line up for the opening matches of the 2013–14 season.

=== Return to Scunthorpe United ===
On 28 November 2013, Williams re-joined Scunthorpe United on loan until 1 January 2014. He signed permanently for Scunthorpe on 10 January 2014 on a one-and-a-half-year contract, having had his contract with Sheffield United cancelled.

=== Kerala Blasters ===
Williams signed for Indian Super League club Kerala Blasters on 29 August 2015.

=== Guiseley ===
Williams signed for National League club Guiseley on 4 August 2016. On 13 February 2018, Williams joined National League North club York City on loan until the end of the 2017–18 season. He made his debut four days later as a sixth-minute substitute for the injured Alex Pattison in a 4–1 defeat away to Curzon Ashton. He did not play again before being recalled by Guiseley on 20 March 2018. He was released at the end of 2017–18.

== Style of play ==
Williams plays at left back. Upon signing for Reading in May 2010, he was described as a "modern attacking full back".

== Career statistics ==
As of end of 2017–18 season

Appearances and goals by club, season and competition
Club	Season	League			FA Cup		League Cup		Other		Total	
Club	Season	Division	Apps	Goals	Apps	Goals	Apps	Goals	Apps	Goals	Apps	Goals
Scunthorpe United	2003–04	Third Division	1	0	0	0	0	0	0	0	1	0
Scunthorpe United	2004–05	League Two	4	0	1	0	0	0	1 (Note: Appearance(s) in Football League Trophy)	0	6	0
Scunthorpe United	2005–06	League One	29	0	3	0	2	0	0	0	34	0
Scunthorpe United	2006–07	League One	35	0	3	0	2	0	2	0	42	0
Scunthorpe United	2007–08	Championship	34	0	1	0	1	0	—		36	0
Scunthorpe United	2008–09	League One	26	0	2	0	1	0	5	0	34	0
Scunthorpe United	2009–10	Championship	37	0	2	0	4	0	—		43	0
Scunthorpe United	Total		166	0	12	0	10	0	8	0	196	0
Reading	2010–11	Championship	3	0	0	0	2	0	0	0	5	0
Reading	2011–12	Championship	0	0	—		0	0	—		0	0
Reading	Total		3	0	0	0	2	0	—		5	0
Peterborough United (loan)	2010–11	League One	3	0	—		—		—		3	0
Scunthorpe United (loan)	2010–11	Championship	5	0	—		—		—		5	0
Sheffield United	2011–12	League One	19	0	3	0	—		1	0	23	0
Sheffield United	2012–13	League One	18	0	3	0	1	0	2	0	24	0
Sheffield United	2013–14	League One	2	0	0	0	1	0	0	0	3	0
Sheffield United	Total		39	0	6	0	2	0	3	0	50	0
Scunthorpe United	2013–14	League Two	26	0	—		—		—		26	0
Scunthorpe United	2014–15	League One	40	0	5	0	1	0	1	0	47	0
Scunthorpe United	Total		66	0	5	0	1	0	1	0	73	0
Kerala Blasters	2015	Indian Super League	5	0	—		—		—		5	0
Guiseley	2016–17	National League	30	0	1	0	—		2 (Note: Appearances in FA Trophy)	0	33	0
Guiseley	2017–18	National League	8	0	0	0	—		0	0	8	0
Guiseley	Total		38	0	1	0	0	0	2	0	41	0
York City (loan)	2017–18	National League North	1	0	—		—		—		1	0
Career total			326	0	24	0	15	0	14	0	379	0

== Honours ==
Scunthorpe United

- Football League One: 2006–07
- Football League Two runner-up: 2013–14
- Football League Trophy runner-up: 2008–09
