= Dave Syers =

English footballer (born 1987)

Personal information
- Full name: David Thomas Syers
- Date of birth: 30 November 1987 (age 38)
- Place of birth: Leeds, England
- Height: 6 ft 0 in (1.83 m)
- Position: Midfielder

Youth career
- Darlington
- Ossett Albion

Senior career*
Years	Team	Apps	(Gls)
2007–2009	Ossett Albion		
2009	Harrogate Town		
2009–2010	Farsley Celtic		
2010	Ossett Albion		
2010	Harrogate Town		
2010	Guiseley		
2010–2012	Bradford City	55	(10)
2012–2014	Doncaster Rovers	34	(3)
2013–2014	→ Scunthorpe United (loan)	15	(5)
2014–2016	Scunthorpe United	31	(5)
2016	Rochdale	6	(0)
2016	Guiseley	2	(0)
2016–2018	Darlington	75	(18)
2018–2023	Farsley Celtic	121	(18)
Total		339	(59)
- * Club domestic league appearances and goals

David Thomas Syers (born 30 November 1987) is an English former professional footballer who played as a midfielder.

After playing youth football with Darlington, Syers played non-league football for Ossett Albion, Harrogate Town, Farsley Celtic and Guiseley while studying at University, before turning professional in 2010 with Bradford City. After spending two seasons with them, he moved to Doncaster Rovers in 2012. While at Doncaster he spent a loan spell with Scunthorpe United, before signing a permanent deal with the club in January 2014. After a period out with injury he moved to Rochdale in January 2016, returned to Guiseley in August, and rejoined Darlington in October, where he spent two years before signing for Farsley Celtic.

== Early and personal life ==
Born in Leeds, Syers attended Leeds Grammar School, representing the school at cricket.

He attended the University of Leeds, where he read classics, and represented the English Universities football team during the 2008–09 season.

He began training as an accountant after signing for Darlington in October 2016.

Dave married his girlfriend Hannah Bickers in June 2013. In October 2016 he was living near Wetherby.

== Football career ==
=== Non-league career ===
Syers played for Darlington between the ages of 14 and 16. He started his career with Ossett Albion while still at school. After playing more than 150 games with Ossett, he moved to Harrogate Town in April 2009. After making three appearances for Harrogate, Syers moved to Farsley Celtic in June 2009. During that season Syers scored nine league goals for Farsley. After a second spell with Ossett Albion in the latter stages of the 2009–2010 season, Syers returned to Harrogate in March 2010. Syers joined Guiseley on 1 July 2010.

=== Bradford City ===
Syers went on trial to League Two side Bradford City on 15 July 2010. He signed on non-contract terms with Bradford on 10 August 2010, before making his professional debut for them that same day, in a 2–1 League Cup victory over Nottingham Forest, in which Syers scored the first goal to take the game into extra time. By the end of the week, Syers signed a full-time contract with City for the rest of the season after impressing manager Peter Taylor. A day later, Syers made his Football League debut, coming on as a second-half substitute for Tommy Doherty in 1–0 victory over Stevenage. In March 2011, Syers' contract was automatically extended by Bradford until the end of the 2011–12 season, following the activation of a clause in his contract regarding match appearances. Following his first season in professional football, Syers was awarded Bradford City's Player's Player of the Year award by his teammates in May 2011. The full Player of the Year award had been cancelled two weeks earlier by the City board following a "rubbish season."

Syers was injured in the second match of the 2011–12 season, a 2–3 defeat against Leeds United in the League Cup; it was announced that he would be out of action for 10 to 12 weeks.

=== Doncaster Rovers ===
After his contract with Bradford expired, he signed a two-year deal with Doncaster Rovers on 14 June 2012. Syers said he was attracted by the ambition of Doncaster's manager, ex-Bradford player Dean Saunders, after the club made him "an offer I couldn't refuse." On the final day of the season, he helped Doncaster win the League One title with a 1–0 win against Brentford.

=== Scunthorpe United ===
He signed an initial one-month loan deal with Scunthorpe United on 5 October 2013. He was recalled by Doncaster on 3 January 2014.

In January 2014 he was linked with a return to former club Bradford City, though the club denied the speculation. Later that month he signed a permanent two-and-a-half-year contract with Scunthorpe. On 22 February 2014, Syers scored the first hat-trick of his career in a 5–1 home victory over Portsmouth. Syers was injured in the opening game of the 2014–15 season, and missed the rest of the campaign. He later stated that his time injured while with Bradford City was helping him with his latest injury.

=== Rochdale ===
After being released by Scunthorpe at the start of the month, Syers joined Rochdale on 18 January 2016, on a contract until the end of the season.

=== Later career ===
His contract with Rochdale was terminated in the summer of 2016, following which he rejoined Guiseley in August 2016.

He moved to Darlington in October 2016, and was a first-team regular for the next two years.

Syers left Darlington for Northern Premier League Premier Division club Farsley Celtic in late November 2018. He retired in April 2023.

== Cricket career ==
Syers played Bradford League cricket for Spen Victoria, Pudsey St Lawrence, Collingham and Farsley, as a wicket-keeper and batsman. In 2010, he scored 225 runs at an average of 75.00 in four innings to help Farsley reach the final of the Priestley Cup, but was unable to play because of his new professional football career.

== Career statistics ==
Appearances and goals by club, season and competition
Club	Season	League			FA Cup		League Cup		Other		Total	
Club	Season	Division	Apps	Goals	Apps	Goals	Apps	Goals	Apps	Goals	Apps	Goals
Bradford City	2010–11	League Two	37	8	1	1	2	1	0	0	40	10
Bradford City	2011–12	League Two	18	2	0	0	1	0	0	0	19	2
Bradford City	Total		55	10	1	1	3	1	0	0	59	12
Doncaster Rovers	2012–13	League One	32	3	2	0	3	2	1 (Note: Appearance in the Football League Trophy)	0	38	5
Doncaster Rovers	2013–14	Championship	2	0	0	0	1	0	0	0	3	0
Doncaster Rovers	Total		34	3	2	0	4	2	1	0	41	5
Scunthorpe United (Note: Syers scored 5 goals from 15 appearances on loan before joining permanently on 10 January 2014)	2013–14	League Two	37	10	0	0	0	0	0	0	37	10
Scunthorpe United	2014–15	League One	6	0	0	0	0	0	0	0	6	0
Scunthorpe United	2015–16	League One	3	0	0	0	0	0	0	0	3	0
Scunthorpe United	Total		46	10	0	0	0	0	0	0	46	10
Rochdale	2015–16	League One	6	0	0	0	0	0	0	0	6	0
Guiseley	2016–17	National League	2	0	0	0	—		0	0	2	0
Darlington 1883	2016–17	National League North	28	9	0	0	—		2 (Note: Appearances in FA Trophy)	0	30	9
Darlington	2017–18	National League North	34	8	1	0	—		1	0	36	8
Darlington	2018–19	National League North	13	1	1	0	—		1	0	15	1
Darlington	Total		75	18	2	0	—		4	0	81	18
Farsley Celtic	2018–19	Northern Premier League Premier Division	17	4	0	0	—		3 (Note: Appearances in Northern Premier League Challenge Cup)	1	20	5
Farsley Celtic	2019–20	National League North	30	9	2	0	—		4	1	36	10
Farsley Celtic	2020–21	National League North	16	2	1	0	—		2	0	19	2
Farsley Celtic	2021–22	National League North	27	1	0	0	—		1	0	28	1
Farsley Celtic	2022–23	National League North	31	2	2	0	—		1	1	34	3
Farsley Celtic	Total		121	18	5	0	—		11	3	137	21
Career total			339	59	10	1	7	3	16	3	372	66

== Honours ==
Doncaster Rovers

- Football League One: 2012–13
