= Gary McSheffrey =

English footballer (born 1982)

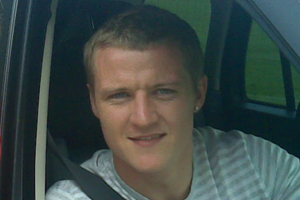
- McSheffrey in 2008

Personal information
- Full name: Gary McSheffrey
- Date of birth: 13 August 1982 (age 44)
- Place of birth: Coventry, England
- Height: 5 ft 8 in (1.73 m)
- Position: Left winger

Youth career
- Coventry City

Senior career*
Years	Team	Apps	(Gls)
1998–2006	Coventry City	143	(44)
2001	→ IK Brage (loan)	6	(0)
2001–2002	→ Stockport County (loan)	5	(1)
2003	→ Luton Town (loan)	18	(8)
2004	→ Luton Town (loan)	5	(1)
2006–2010	Birmingham City	83	(16)
2009	→ Nottingham Forest (loan)	4	(0)
2010	→ Leeds United (loan)	10	(1)
2010–2013	Coventry City	104	(17)
2013–2014	Chesterfield	9	(1)
2014–2016	Scunthorpe United	80	(12)
2016	→ Doncaster Rovers (loan)	7	(1)
2016–2017	Doncaster Rovers	12	(0)
2017	Eastleigh	11	(2)
2018	Grimsby Town	6	(0)
2018	Frickley Athletic	4	(0)
2020	Rossington Main	1	(0)
Total		508	(104)

International career
2002	England U20	6	(0)

Managerial career
- 2021–2022: Doncaster Rovers
- * Club domestic league appearances and goals

Gary McSheffrey (born 13 August 1982) is an English football manager and former player who is U-21 head coach at Sheffield United.

As a player he was a striker and left winger who made more than 450 appearances in the Football League and Premier League, including 247 for Coventry City, where he became the youngest player ever to play in the Premier League. He went on to play for Stockport County, Luton Town, Birmingham City, Nottingham Forest, and Leeds United before returning to Coventry in 2010. Released in September 2013, he signed for Chesterfield later that month. In January 2014, he signed for Scunthorpe United on a free transfer until the end of the 2013–14 season before moving on to Doncaster Rovers, Eastleigh, Grimsby Town, and Frickley Athletic. He scored more than 100 league goals during his career. McSheffrey played internationally for England at under-20 level.

After a short spell as caretaker manager of Doncaster, he was appointed manager in December 2021.

He is the development coach at Sheffield United as of August 2024.

== Club career ==
=== Coventry City ===
McSheffrey was born in Coventry, and began his football career at home town club Coventry City. When he made his first-team debut against local rivals Aston Villa at the age of 16 years and 198 days on 27 February 1999, a game that Coventry won 4–1, he became the youngest player ever to play in the Premier League. He held the record for over four years until Aaron Lennon made his Leeds United debut at a younger age in August 2003. During his time at Coventry he spent loan spells at Stockport County, Luton Town earlier in the 2004–05 season helping them achieve promotion to the Championship, and Swedish side IK Brage. He represented England at under-18 and under-20 levels.

Playing primarily on the left wing in the 2005–06 season, McSheffrey ended up among the top scorers in the Football League Championship with 15 league goals. It was form like this that brought him to the attention of local rivals Birmingham City during the summer of 2006. After weeks of bidding, Coventry accepted an offer valued at £4 million. This has since been estimated at £2.3m cash with a further £1.3m depending on promotion and appearances. The deal was completed on 16 August 2006, and McSheffrey became a Birmingham City player three days after his 24th birthday.

=== Birmingham City ===
McSheffrey scored his first hat-trick for his new club in a league match against Preston North End on 9 December 2006. He was part of the 2006–07 promotion-winning side, returning to the Premier League after just one season in the Championship. McSheffrey was also their top scorer with 16 goals, of which 13 were scored in the league. His penalty in Birmingham's 3–2 win against Tottenham Hotspur at White Hart Lane on 2 December 2007 was his first goal in the Premier League. McSheffrey found his time limited during the 2008–09 season; he helped the side clinch promotion back to the Premier League by winning four out of six league appearances he made. In March 2009, he joined Nottingham Forest on loan for what was reported as an initial month. and then to have returned to Birmingham because he needed surgery on a persistent knee problem, but manager Alex McLeish confirmed that the loan was in fact for two months. Told in August 2009 that he was free to find another club, and frustrated by lack of opportunity, McSheffrey made just one start and four substitute appearances in the 2009–10 Premier League.

==== Leeds United (loan) ====
On 29 January 2010, McSheffrey joined Leeds United of Football League One on loan for the remainder of the season. He made his debut the following day, producing a man-of-the-match performance on the left wing in Leeds' 2–0 League home win against Colchester United. In an interview after the game McSheffrey said "there'd be no better club to be with at Championship level" should Leeds succeed in gaining promotion.

Ineligible for an FA Cup replay against Tottenham Hotspur, McSheffrey returned to the starting line-up for the 2–2 draw with Hartlepool United. He started on the left wing for Leeds against Carlisle United in the Football League Trophy Northern Final second leg. Leeds won the game 3–2, but ended up losing the tie after losing the penalty shootout 6–5, with McSheffrey converting one of the penalties for Leeds.

He scored his first and only goal for Leeds against Walsall after his mis-hit cross eluded goalkeeper Clayton Ince, but Walsall won 2–1 to inflict Leeds' first home defeat in more than a year. McSheffrey was dropped to the bench against Oldham Athletic and replaced in the starting line-up by Aidan White, but after White suffered an injury McSheffrey returned to Leeds' starting line-up against Huddersfield Town. McSheffrey earned promotion with Leeds to the Championship, after finishing as runners up in League One.

=== Return to Coventry City ===
In May 2010, Birmingham City announced that McSheffrey was one of five players to be released when their contracts expired at the end of June. He agreed to return to Championship club Coventry City, where he agreed a one-year deal, with the option of a further year, to begin on 1 July 2010.

His return to Coventry was a largely disappointing spell in his career, despite being a regular starter, fans felt that his best years were past him. McSheffrey was one of eight players told in June 2013 that they did not feature in manager Steven Pressley's future plans, and one of five who had to train on their own during pre-season. On 3 September, his contract was cancelled.

=== Chesterfield ===
Ten days later, he signed a four-month contract with League Two club Chesterfield.

=== Scunthorpe United ===
On 14 January 2014, McSheffrey signed for Scunthorpe United until the end of the 2013–14 season. McSheffrey made his United debut on 25 January in a 3–3 draw away to Dagenham & Redbridge, and his home debut two days later in a goalless draw with Fleetwood. His first goal for the club came from a 35-yard (32 m) free kick in a 2–1 win against Walsall on 30 August. He played 37 times for United in the league that season, scoring four goals, as they finished 16th behind Oldham Athletic by one point.

=== Doncaster Rovers ===
On 23 March 2016, McSheffrey signed for fellow League One club Doncaster Rovers on loan until the end of the season.

=== Eastleigh ===
McSheffrey joined National League club Eastleigh on 7 September 2017 on a deal until January 2018. He scored twice from 11 league appearances before his contract was cancelled by mutual consent for family reasons in late November.

=== Grimsby Town ===
McSheffrey joined League Two club Grimsby Town as a free agent on 15 March 2018 until the end of the season. He was released at the end of the season.

== Coaching career ==
McSheffrey played a one-match trial for Boston United in their Lincolnshire Senior Cup defeat against Lincoln United in July 2018, before joining the coaching staff at Doncaster Rovers' Academy as professional development phase coach working with the under-18 team. Alongside his coaching role, he played a few matches for Northern Premier League East side Frickley Athletic early in the 2018–19 season, and made his debut for Northern Counties East League club Rossington Main in October 2020.

On 2 December 2021, McSheffrey was appointed caretaker manager of Doncaster Rovers following the sacking of manager Richie Wellens with the club 23rd in the table. After four matches in charge, he was appointed manager on a permanent basis.

On 17 October 2022, McSheffrey was sacked by Doncaster Rovers.

On 12 August 2024, he was appointed as the head U-21 coach at Sheffield United

== Personal life ==
McSheffrey has coached children in the Coventry area via the Soccer Rockz football coaching programme, in association with Coventry City Football Club (CCFC).

A former pupil of Bishop Ullathorne School, McSheffrey is a Roman Catholic.

== Career statistics ==
Appearances and goals by club, season and competition
Club	Season	League			FA Cup		League Cup		Other		Total	
Club	Season	Division	Apps	Goals	Apps	Goals	Apps	Goals	Apps	Goals	Apps	Goals
Coventry City	1998–99	Premier League	1	0	0	0	0	0	—		1	0
Coventry City	1999–2000	Premier League	3	0	0	0	2	0	—		5	0
Coventry City	2000–01	Premier League	0	0	0	0	0	0	—		0	0
Coventry City	2001–02	First Division	8	1	0	0	1	0	—		9	1
Coventry City	2002–03	First Division	29	4	2	0	2	5	—		33	8
Coventry City	2003–04	First Division	19	11	3	1	0	0	—		22	12
Coventry City	2004–05	Championship	37	12	2	2	2	0	—		41	14
Coventry City	2005–06	Championship	43	15	3	1	2	1	—		48	17
Coventry City	2006–07	Championship	3	1	—		—		—		3	1
Coventry City	Total		143	44	10	4	9	6	—		162	53
IK Brage (loan)	2001	Superettan	6	0	—		—		—		6	0
Stockport County (loan)	2001–02	First Division	5	1	—		—		—		5	1
Luton Town (loan)	2003–04	Second Division	18	8	0	0	1	1	0	0	19	9
Luton Town (loan)	2004–05	League One	5	1	—		—		0	0	5	1
Luton Town (loan)	Total		23	9	0	0	1	1	0	0	24	10
Birmingham City	2006–07	Championship	40	13	3	1	2	2	—		45	16
Birmingham City	2007–08	Premier League	32	3	1	0	1	1	—		34	4
Birmingham City	2008–09	Championship	6	0	0	0	2	0	—		8	0
Birmingham City	2009–10	Premier League	5	0	2	0	2	0	—		9	0
Birmingham City	Total		83	16	6	1	7	3	—		96	20
Nottingham Forest (loan)	2008–09	Championship	4	0	—		—		—		4	0
Leeds United (loan)	2009–10	League One	10	1	—		—		1 (Note: Appearance(s) in Football League Trophy)	0	11	1
Coventry City	2010–11	Championship	33	8	2	0	0	0	—		35	8
Coventry City	2011–12	Championship	39	8	1	1	1	0	—		41	9
Coventry City	2012–13	League One	32	1	3	1	3	0	5	0	43	2
Coventry City	2013–14	League One	0	0	—		0	0	—		0	0
Coventry City	Total		104	17	6	2	4	0	5	0	119	19
Chesterfield	2013–14	League Two	9	1	1	0	—		2	1	12	2
Scunthorpe United	2013–14	League Two	13	0	—		—		—		13	0
Scunthorpe United	2014–15	League One	41	7	5	2	2	0	2	1	50	10
Scunthorpe United	2015–16	League One	26	5	1	0	0	0	1	0	28	5
Scunthorpe United	Total		80	12	6	2	2	0	3	1	91	15
Doncaster Rovers (loan)	2015–16	League One	7	1	—		—		—		7	1
Doncaster Rovers	2016–17	League Two	12	0	0	0	0	0	0	0	12	0
Doncaster Rovers	Total		19	1	0	0	0	0	0	0	19	1
Eastleigh	2017–18	National League	11	2	1	0	—		0	0	12	2
Grimsby Town	2017–18	League Two	5	0	—		—		—		5	0
Frickley Athletic	2018–19	Northern Premier League; First Division East	4	0	2	0	—		1 (Note: Appearance in Northern Premier League Cup)	0	7	0
Career total			506	104	32	9	23	10	12	2	573	124

== Managerial statistics ==
As of match played 15 October 2022

Managerial record by team and tenure
Team	From	To	Record				
Team	From	To	P	W	D	L	Win %
Doncaster Rovers	2 December 2021	17 October 2022	46	14	8	24	30.4
Total			46	14	8	24	30.4

== Honours ==
=== As a player ===
Luton Town

- Football League One: 2004–05

Birmingham City

- Football League Championship second-place promotion: 2006–07, 2008–09

Leeds United

- Football League One second-place promotion: 2009–10

Scunthorpe United

- Football League Two second-place promotion: 2013–14

Doncaster Rovers

- EFL League Two third-place promotion: 2016–17

Individual

- PFA Team of the Year: 2006–07 Football League Championship
