= Matt Sparrow =

English footballer (born 1981)

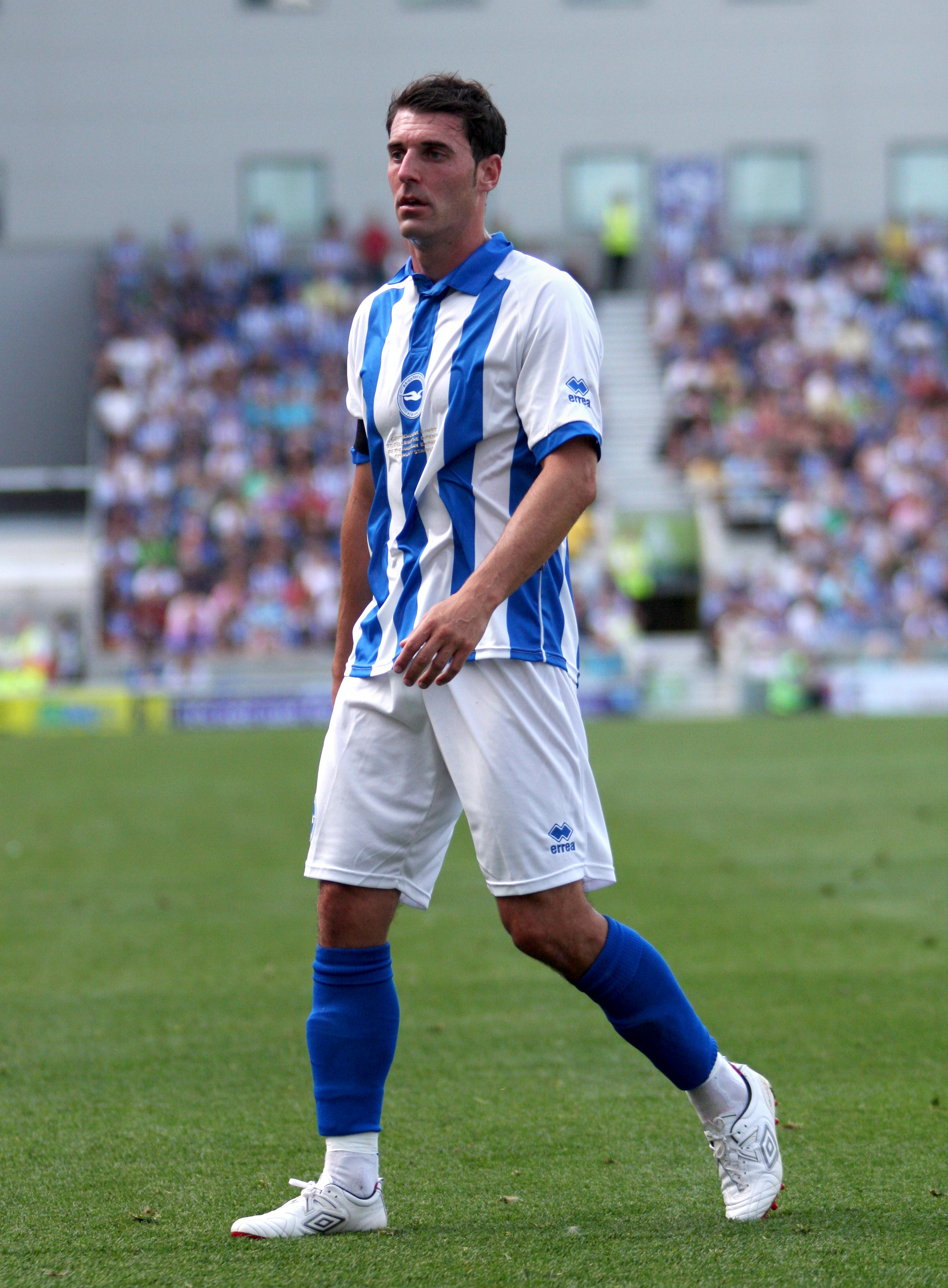
- Sparrow playing for Brighton & Hove Albion in 2011

Personal information
- Full name: Matthew Ronald Sparrow
- Date of birth: 3 October 1981 (age 45)
- Place of birth: Wembley, England
- Height: 5 ft 11 in (1.80 m)
- Position: Midfielder

Youth career
- –1999: Scunthorpe United

Senior career*
Years	Team	Apps	(Gls)
1999–2010	Scunthorpe United	336	(36)
2010–2013	Brighton & Hove Albion	47	(6)
2013	Crawley Town	17	(3)
2013–2015	Scunthorpe United	35	(4)
2015	→ Cheltenham Town (loan)	11	(1)
2015–2016	Lincoln City	31	(0)
2016	Sorrento	9	(0)
2016	Gainsborough Trinity	4	(0)
2017–2019	Joondalup United	22	(3)
2020	Bayswater City		
2021	Fremantle City		
Total		512	(53)

Managerial career
- 2023-2024: Fremantle City
- 2025-current: Bayswater City
- * Club domestic league appearances and goals as of 3 June 2020

Matthew Ronald Sparrow (born 3 October 1981) is an English former professional footballer who played as a midfielder

Sparrow made 440 appearances in the Football League across his 17-year-long playing career, notably 369 over two spells with Scunthorpe United, also appearing professionally for Brighton & Hove Albion, Crawley Town, Cheltenham Town and Lincoln City. He went on to play at non-league level for Gainsborough Trinity, before emigrating to Australia going on to feature semi-professionally for Sorrento, Joondalup United, Bayswater City and Fremantle City.

== Club career ==
=== Scunthorpe United ===
Born in Wembley, London, Sparrow spent 11 years of his professional career at Scunthorpe United, playing in the bottom three tiers of league football for them. He formally signed for the club as a 16-year-old and played in the FA Youth Alliance final for Scunthorpe at the old Wembley stadium against West Bromwich Albion.

After spending several months in prison in 2001, he became a regular in the Scunthorpe first team. He was part of the team that won promotion to the Championship after finishing the 2006–07 season as champions. In August 2007, he was offered a new three-year contract with the club.

Sparrow scored twice in the 2008–09 League One Play-off Final at Wembley Stadium against Millwall, helping them to a 3–2 victory and promotion to the Championship.

==== Testimonial year ====
Sparrow made his 300th appearance for Scunthorpe in April 2009, and subsequently played in a testimonial match which took take place on 1 May. Former Scunthorpe striker Billy Sharp and veteran midfielder Peter Beagrie returned for the match. Also involved were Jack Cork, Alex Calvo Garcia, Jamie McCombe, Jamie Forrester, John Eyre, Lee Ridley, Paul Wilson, Steve Housham, Andy Butler, Mark Jackson, Martin Carruthers, Steve Torpey, Lee Hodges, Paul Harsley, Wayne Graves, Lee Turnbull, Tony Daws, Andy Crosby, Ian Baraclough, Cleveland Taylor, Chris Hope, Kevin Sharp, Kevin Pressman, Paul Musselwhite, Justin Walker, Ross Hyslop, Brian Quailey, Sam Beagrie, Des Comerford and Simon Elliott – plus managers Brian Laws and Nigel Adkins.

On 24 June 2010, it was reported that Sparrow had turned down a new contract offer and was looking elsewhere to continue his career.

=== Brighton & Hove Albion ===
On 29 June 2010, Sparrow signed for League One side Brighton & Hove Albion, penning a three-year contract. Brighton won the League One championship that season (in which Sparrow scored four goals) and were promoted to the Championship. In the 2011–12 season, Sparrow scored two goals, both in the 3–0 home win over Southampton. However, he received a red card and a three-match suspension in February's win against Leicester City, for a reckless sliding tackle.

=== Crawley Town ===
On 10 January 2013, Sparrow signed for League One and fellow Sussex side Crawley Town on a free transfer. Sparrow made his Crawley debut only two days later on 12 January, coming on in the 67th minute as a substitute replacing fellow midfielder Dannie Bulman, in a 2–0 defeat against Tranmere Rovers. He made his home debut on 2 February in a 1–1 draw against Swindon Town. He scored his first goal for the club on 9 February in a 2–1 defeat against his former club Scunthorpe United. He scored his second goal for the club in a 2–2 draw against Yeovil Town. He played 17 times for Crawley in the league that season, scoring three goals as they finished in 10th place, their highest-ever league placing.

=== Return to Scunthorpe United ===
Sparrow returned to his old club Scunthorpe United on 2 July 2013 after being released by Crawley Town. On 5 May 2015 it was announced that Sparrow wouldn't be offered a new deal and was free to leave the club.

=== Later career ===
On 24 June 2015, he signed a one-year deal with Conference Premier club Lincoln City and make his debut in a home game against Cheltenham Town.

In 2016, he emigrated to Western Australia and joined semi-professional club Sorrento.

On 6 October 2016, it was announced that Sparrow had signed with Gainsborough Trinity of the National League North. He made a total of 4 appearances for Gainsborough before returning to Australia.

Sparrow signed for Joondalup United for the 2017 National Premier Leagues season, where it was announced that he would also work in a coaching role.

== Personal life ==
He attended the John Leggott College in Scunthorpe between 1998 and 2000, studying Leisure and Tourism.

== Career statistics ==
As of 1 April 2014.

Appearances and goals by club, season and competition
Club	Season	League			FA Cup		League Cup		Other		Total	
Club	Season	Division	Apps	Goals	Apps	Goals	Apps	Goals	Apps	Goals	Apps	Goals
Scunthorpe United	1999–2000	Second Division	11	0	0	0	1	0	1 (Note: Appearance(s) in Football League Trophy)	0	13	0
Scunthorpe United	2000–01	Third Division	11	4	0	0	2	0	0	0	13	4
Scunthorpe United	2001–02	Third Division	24	1	1	0	0	0	0	0	25	1
Scunthorpe United	2002–03	Third Division	42	9	3	0	1	0	3 (Note: 1 appearance in Football League Trophy, 2 appearances in Football League Third Division play-offs)	0	49	9
Scunthorpe United	2003–04	Third Division	38	3	6	0	2	0	4	1	50	4
Scunthorpe United	2004–05	League Two	44	5	3	1	1	0	1	0	49	6
Scunthorpe United	2005–06	League One	39	5	3	0	2	0	1	0	45	5
Scunthorpe United	2006–07	League One	29	4	3	0	2	0	0	0	34	4
Scunthorpe United	2007–08	Championship	32	1	1	0	1	0	—		34	1
Scunthorpe United	2008–09	League One	36	4	3	0	1	0	10 (Note: 7 appearances in Football League Trophy, 3 appearances and 2 goals in Football League One play-offs)	2	50	6
Scunthorpe United	2009–10	Championship	30	1	1	0	3	1	—		34	2
Scunthorpe United	Total		336	37	24	1	16	1	20	3	396	42
Brighton & Hove Albion	2010–11	League One	29	4	5	2	1	0	1	0	36	6
Brighton & Hove Albion	2011–12	Championship	18	2	3	0	1	0	—		22	2
Brighton & Hove Albion	2012–13	Championship	0	0	0	0	0	0	—		0	0
Brighton & Hove Albion	Total		47	6	8	2	2	0	1	0	58	8
Crawley Town	2012–13	League One	17	3	0	0	0	0	0	0	17	3
Scunthorpe United	2013–14	League Two	20	2	1	0	1	0	1	0	23	2
Career totals			420	48	33	3	19	1	22	3	494	55

== Honours ==
Scunthorpe United

- Football League One: 2006–07; play-offs: 2009
- Football League Trophy runner-up: 2008–09

Brighton & Hove Albion

- Football League One: 2010–11
