= Jamie Wootton =

English footballer

Personal information
- Full name: Jamie Wootton
- Date of birth: 2 October 1994 (age 32)
- Place of birth: Rotherham, England
- Position: Forward

Senior career*
Years	Team	Apps	(Gls)
2012–2014	Scunthorpe United	2	(0)
2013	→ Gainsborough Trinity (loan)	5	(1)
- * Club domestic league appearances and goals as of 12:30, 21 February 2013 (UTC)

Jamie Wootton (born 2 October 1994) is an English footballer.

== Career ==
Wootton began his career with Scunthorpe United and made his professional debut on 8 December 2012 in a 2–1 defeat against Bournemouth.
