= Kevin van Veen =

Dutch footballer (born 1991)

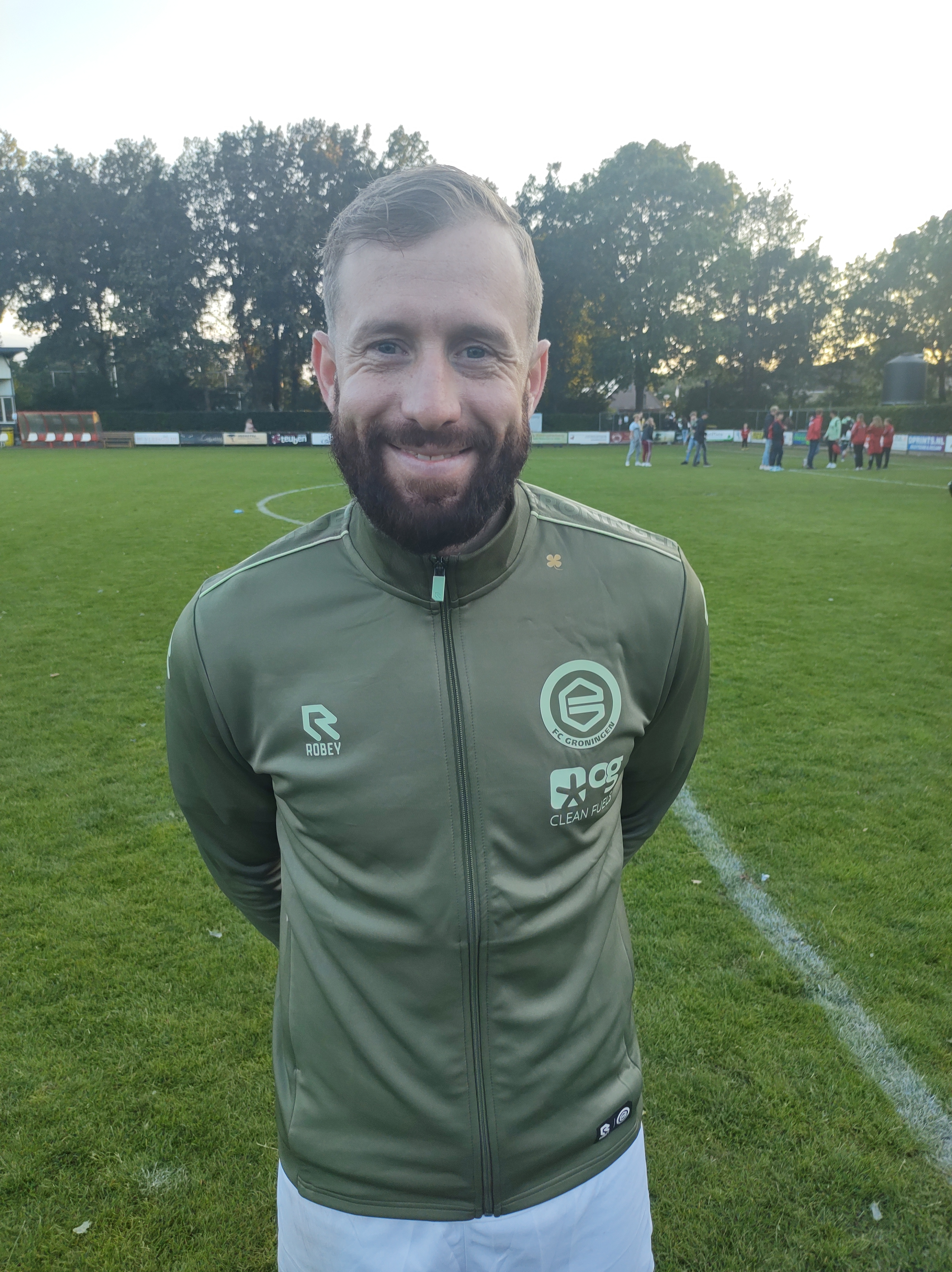
- van Veen with Groningen in 2023

Personal information
- Full name: Kevin van Veen
- Date of birth: 1 June 1991 (age 35)
- Place of birth: Eindhoven, Netherlands
- Height: 1.85 m (6 ft 1 in)
- Position: Forward

Team information
- Current team: FC Eindhoven
- Number: 9

Youth career
- RKVV Tongelre
- PSV
- Helmond Sport

Senior career*
Years	Team	Apps	(Gls)
2010–2011	Helmond Sport	6	(0)
2011–2012	Dijkse Boys		(17)
2012–2013	UDI '19		(16)
2013–2014	JVC Cuijk	29	(20)
2014–2015	FC Oss	20	(16)
2015–2018	Scunthorpe United	94	(19)
2016	→ Cambuur (loan)	12	(1)
2018–2019	Northampton Town	35	(7)
2019–2021	Scunthorpe United	59	(12)
2021–2023	Motherwell	70	(34)
2023–2025	Groningen	14	(5)
2024	→ Kilmarnock (loan)	12	(0)
2024	→ St Mirren (loan)	5	(0)
2025–	FC Eindhoven	25	(4)
- * Club domestic league appearances and goals as of 28 April 2026

Kevin van Veen (born 1 June 1991) is a Dutch professional footballer who plays as a forward for Eerste Divisie club FC Eindhoven.

A youth product of PSV Eindhoven, van Veen had to work his way through the Dutch leagues, playing for Helmond Sport, Dijkse Boys, UDI '19, JVC Cuijk and FC Oss. Scoring double figure goals each season, van Veen earnt a move to League One club, Scunthorpe United. Van Veen spent a year a Cambuur, on loan, and a year at Northampton Town before returning to Scunthorpe.

After being released by Scunthorpe at the end of 2020–21 season, van Veen joined Scottish Premiership side Motherwell. In his second season, van Veen was named in the PFA Scotland Team of the Year and was nominated for the PFA Scotland Players' Player of the Year award.

== Career ==
=== Early career ===
Born in Eindhoven, the Netherlands, van Veen started out playing football at PSV. He spent six years at the academy before being released by PSV, due to his height – this broke a teenage van Veen, who opted to just play amateur football and began plastering. He was tempted back into the professional game by Helmond Sport in 2005. He was promoted to the first team in 2010. He went on to make six appearances for Helmond Sport. Van Veen would go on to play for Dijkse Boys, UDI '19 and JVC Cuijk. In each season, van Veen would score over 15 goals, earning him a move back into the Eerste Divisie.

=== FC Oss ===
In July 2014, it was announced that FC Oss had signed van Veen on a one–year contract.

After making his FC Oss debut, van Veen scored a hat–trick in the next game on 15 August 2014, in a 3–0 win over RKC Waalwijk. van Veen then scored consecutively on two occasions; the first one came when he scored two goals in two games between 25 August and 30 August against VVV-Venlo and De Graafschap and the second one came when he scored three goals in three games between 3 October and 26 October against MVV Maastricht, Eindhoven and N.E.C. He then scored his second FC Oss hat–trick but was sent–off for the second bookable offence, in a 5–4 win over Fortuna Sittard on 12 December. After returning from suspension, van Veen scored his third FC Oss hat–trick on 23 January 2015, in a 4–1 win over Almere City. Amid to scoring sixteen goals in twenty–one appearances, van Veen was linked a move away from FC Oss, attracting interest from English clubs in League One.

=== Scunthorpe United ===
In the January transfer window, van Veen was a subject of a transfer bid from English side Scunthorpe United on 28 January 2015. The move was confirmed on 30 January, with van Veen signing a three-and-a-half-year deal for an undisclosed fee.

On 7 February, van Veen made his Scunthorpe United debut, coming on as a second-half substitute, in a 1–0 loss against Oldham Athletic. A week later, he scored his first goal for the club by chipping past Wes Foderingham, in a 3–1 win over Swindon Town. After the match, manager Mark Robins commented on his first goal, quoting: "His goal was joy to behold. He is a really confident lad and confident in his ability to put the ball in the net." He scored again on 21 March, in a 3–1 loss against Rochdale. At the end of the 2014–15 season, van Veen went on to make twenty appearances and scoring two times in all competitions.

At the start of the 2015–16 season, van Veen remained a first team regular at the club despite being featured most of the first half of the season on the substitute bench. However, in a 0–0 draw against Millwall on 22 August, he suffered a head injury and had to be substituted in the second half as a result. Eventually, he recovered in time for the match against Colchester United on 29 August, and scored in a 2–2 draw. This earned him the club's Goal of the Month for August. His second goal came on 10 October, in a 4–2 win over Oldham Athletic. However, van Veen soon lost his first team place throughout the first half of the season. Although he was loaned out for the second half of the season, he went on to make twenty–five appearances and scoring two times in all competitions.

Ahead of the 2016–17 season, van Veen was given a number ten shirt for the new season. He started the 2016–17 season when he scored in the opening game of the season, in a 3–1 win over Bristol Rovers. van Veen also scored four goals throughout August against Notts County (twice), Fleetwood Town (in which he was later voted Goal of the Season) and Gillingham. van Veen then established himself in the first team for the side this season, forming a striking partnership with Paddy Madden. By the end of 2016, he scored four league goals for the side and his performance attracted interest from Chinese Super League side Henan Jianye, who had their £4 million bid rejected. Manager Graham Alexander confirmed that the bid had been rejected, citing his desire to keep him. Despite this, van Veen continued to remain in the first team for the rest of the 2016–17 season, in which he scored two more goals against Charlton Athletic and Coventry City. His goal against Coventry City earned him April's Goal of the Month. Although he made forty–two appearances and scoring twelve times in all competitions, van Veen played an important role at the club this season for "his more than capable of providing an attacking threat from the position".

==== Cambuur (loan) ====
In January 2016, van Veen was subsequently loaned out to SC Cambuur for the rest of the 2015–16 season. It came after when he became a replacement for the departing Bartholomew Ogbeche.

On 7 February, van Veen made his SC Cambuur debut, where he started the whole game, in a 2–0 loss against Groningen. It was not until on 2 April when he scored his first goal for the club, in a 2–2 draw against De Graafschap. Although he scored once, van Veen became a first team regular, making twelve appearances for the club.

=== Northampton Town ===
On 30 January 2018, van Veen signed for fellow League One side Northampton Town on a two-and-a-half-year deal for an undisclosed fee. He made his debut for the club on 3 February, coming off the bench in a 1–0 defeat at home to Rochdale. He would go on to make 10 appearances for Northampton in the 2017–18 season, but did not get on the scoresheet as Northampton were relegated to EFL League Two.

Van Veen started the season in fine form for Northampton scoring in his first match of the season in a 2–2 draw with Carlisle United, before following this up with a brace the following week in another 2–2 draw, this time with Cambridge United. He made his last appearance for the club in a 2–1 defeat to Forest Green Rovers on 1 January 2019. He played 38 times in total for Northampton and scored ten goals over two seasons.

=== Return to Scunthorpe United ===
On 1 January 2019, van Veen returned to Scunthorpe United for an undisclosed fee following a spell with Northampton Town. He played fourteen games, for Scunthorpe, in the 2018–19 season and only scored once. Scunthorpe United were relegated from League One. His next season, in League Two, saw him play 27 league games and score ten goals. He also scored three goals in six cup competitions, including a brace against a strong Manchester City U21s side. In this game, he was also involved in some controversy with Taylor Harwood-Bellis, van Veen pushed the youngster into some hoardings and then van Veen claimed he "cashed [him] up" by saying "[Harwood-Bellis] had more money than [van Veen]." Harwood-Bellis denied the claims and eventually Pep Guardiola publicly defended Harwood-Bellis.

Despite a strong season from van Veen, Scunthorpe were in a relegation battle. Due to the COVID-19 pandemic, the season was cancelled and a point-per-game format helped Scunthorpe survive relegation. In the next season, van Veen started well, scoring twice in two games, but would go goalless for the rest of the season and Scunthorpe were once again in a relegation battle. They avoided relegation by just one place. Following an extremely underwhelming 2020–21 season, van Veen decided to not renew his contract, deciding instead to become a free agent.

=== Motherwell ===
On 2 July 2021, van Veen signed for Scottish Premiership side Motherwell. His move there saw him reunited with ex-Scunthorpe manager, Graham Alexander. He made his debut in a 1–0 win against Queen's Park in the Scottish League Cup, and made his Scottish Premier League debut (and scored his first goal) in a 3–2 loss to Hibernian. Despite losing the game, former Scotland internationals Steven Naismith and Chris Iwelumo praised van Veen's performance. Iwelumo commented that "[van Veen] was outstanding", while Naismith remarked "it all seemed to click" for the striker on his debut. On 12 February 2022, van Veen scored in a 2–1 victory to Aberdeen. After the game, van Veen claimed the Aberdeen defenders – specifically Declan Gallagher and David Bates, punched him in the ribs in an attempt to provoke a reaction. Van Veen claimed there were similar actions in Motherwell's 2–0 victory over Aberdeen earlier in the year – suggesting Scott Brown tried provoking him to get him sent off. In his debut campaign, van Veen scored 9 goals in 32 league appearances as Motherwell finished fifth in the 2021–22 season.

On 26 July 2022, van Veen signed a one-year extension to his contract, keeping him at Motherwell until the summer of 2024. van Veen opened his account for the season on the opening day, in a 1–0 victory against St Mirren. van Veen has scored 25 goals, from 40 appearances, in all competitions, including hat-tricks against Inverness Caledonian Thistle and Ross County. From 4 March to 28 May 2023, van Veen scored in every game – the first time a Motherwell player scored in seven consecutive league games since Dixie Deans in the 1968–69 season. On 25 May, by scoring in ten league games consecutively, he equalled Motherwell's top-flight consecutive scoring record set in 1920 by Hughie Ferguson. He also equalled the consecutive scoring record of modern era Scottish football held by Mark Viduka and Marco Negri. On 28 May, he scored in the final game of the 2022–23 season, and set a new league and club record by scoring in eleven games consecutively. Similar to the end of 2016, another Chinese Super League club, this time Changchun Yatai, had offered Motherwell a six figure sum for the striker, but this offer was turned down. For his goal scoring heroics, van Veen was named in the PFA Scotland Team of the Year and was nominated for the PFA Scotland Players' Player of the Year award.

=== Groningen ===
In June 2023, it was announced that Van Veen would return to the Netherlands and join FC Groningen, relegated from the Eredivisie to Eerste Divisie, for the 2023–24 season.

Van Veen returned to Scottish football soon afterwards, joining Kilmarnock on loan on 1 February 2024.

On 31 August 2024, he returned to Scotland on loan once again, this time joining St Mirren. However, his loan was terminated due to domestic abuse charges.

=== FC Eindhoven ===
On 31 July 2025, Van Veen signed a two-year contract with his hometown club FC Eindhoven of the Eerste Divisie. He made his first appearance for the club on 4 October 2025, coming on in a 3–1 defeat away to MVV. He later said the comeback followed a difficult period in which he experienced depression, crediting his daughter with helping him persevere.

== Personal life ==
Van Veen grew up supporting PSV and idolising Ruud van Nistelrooy. After being released by PSV as a youngster, he briefly worked as a plasterer while continuing to pursue football.

=== Legal issues ===
In November 2024, while on loan at St Mirren from FC Groningen, Van Veen appeared at Hamilton Sheriff Court charged with domestic abuse offences; he denied the allegation through his lawyer.

On 6 November 2025, Scottish media reported that he had pled guilty to engaging in a course of abusive behaviour between September 2021 and December 2023, but failed to attend sentencing at Hamilton Sheriff Court; a warrant was issued for his arrest. Later the same day, FC Eindhoven managing director Peter Bijvelds told regional media that Van Veen was with the squad in Eindhoven and called the absence a "calendar mix-up".

== Career statistics ==
As of match played 7 November 2025

Appearances and goals by club, season and competition
Club	Season	League			National cup (Note: Includes KNVB Cup, FA Cup, Scottish Cup)		League cup (Note: Includes EFL Cup, Scottish League Cup)		Other		Total	
Club	Season	Division	Apps	Goals	Apps	Goals	Apps	Goals	Apps	Goals	Apps	Goals
Helmond Sport	2010–11	Eerste Divisie	6	0	1	0	—		0	0	7	0
JVC Cuijk	2013–14	Topklasse	29	20	5	4	—		0	0	34	24
FC Oss	2014–15	Eerste Divisie	20	16	1	0	—		0	0	21	16
Scunthorpe United	2014–15	League One	20	2	0	0	0	0	0	0	20	2
Scunthorpe United	2015–16	League One	20	2	3	0	1	0	1 (Note: Appearances in the Football League Trophy)	0	25	2
Scunthorpe United	2016–17	League One	33	10	1	0	2	2	6 (Note: Five appearances in the Football League Trophy, one appearance in the League One play-offs)	0	42	12
Scunthorpe United	2017–18	League One	21	5	3	0	1	0	4	2	29	7
Scunthorpe United	Total		94	19	7	0	4	2	11	2	115	23
Cambuur (loan)	2015–16	Eredivisie	12	1	0	0	—		0	0	12	1
Northampton Town	2017–18	League One	10	0	—		—		—		10	0
Northampton Town	2018–19	League Two	25	7	1	1	0	0	2	2	28	10
Northampton Town	Total		35	7	1	1	0	0	2	2	38	10
Scunthorpe United	2018–19	League One	13	1	—		—		—		13	1
Scunthorpe United	2019–20	League Two	27	10	1	0	0	0	5	5	33	15
Scunthorpe United	2020–21	League Two	19	1	1	1	0	0	1	0	21	2
Scunthorpe United	Total		59	12	2	1	0	0	6	5	67	18
Motherwell	2021–22	Scottish Premiership	32	9	3	2	4	0	—		39	11
Motherwell	2022–23	Scottish Premiership	38	25	2	1	2	3	2 (Note: Appearances in the Europa Conference League)	0	44	29
Motherwell	Total		70	34	5	3	6	3	2	0	83	40
Groningen	2023–24	Eredivisie	14	5	1	0	—		—		15	5
Kilmarnock (loan)	2023–24	Scottish Premiership	12	0	1	0	0	0	—		13	0
St Mirren (loan)	2024–25	Scottish Premiership	5	0	0	0	0	0	—		5	0
Eindhoven	2025–26	Eerste Divisie	5	0	1	0	—		—		6	0
Career total			361	114	25	9	10	5	21	9	417	137
