= Devonte Redmond =

English footballer (born 1996)

Personal information
- Full name: Devonte Vincent Redmond
- Date of birth: 19 September 1996 (age 30)
- Place of birth: Manchester, England
- Height: 6 ft 2 in (1.88 m)
- Position: Midfielder

Youth career
- Fletcher Moss Rangers
- 2013–2017: Manchester United

Senior career*
Years	Team	Apps	(Gls)
2017–2018	Manchester United	0	(0)
2017–2018	→ Scunthorpe United (loan)	1	(0)
2019	Salford City	13	(2)
2019–2022	Wrexham	25	(2)
2022	→ Kidderminster Harriers (loan)	14	(0)
2022–2024	Gulf United	5	(1)
- * Club domestic league appearances and goals as of 09:57, 19 December 2022 (UTC)

Devonte Vincent Redmond (born 19 September 1996) is an English professional footballer who plays as a midfielder.

Redmond began his career with the academy of Manchester United, but left in 2018 without making an appearance. He made his professional debut while on loan at Scunthorpe United. After leaving United, he signed for Salford City, helping them achieve promotion to the English Football League for the first time in their history, before leaving for Wrexham, where he spent three years including a loan spell at Kidderminster Harriers.

== Club career ==
Born in Manchester, Redmond formally signed for Manchester United in July 2013 from Fletcher Moss Rangers, although he had been associated with the club since the age of 8. During his time in the youth system at Old Trafford, he won the U21 Premier League twice and played in the UEFA Youth League.

In July 2017, he joined League One side Scunthorpe United on a loan deal until January 2018. Redmond made his debut for Scunthorpe against Notts County in the EFL Cup on 8 August 2017, coming on for Sam Mantom in the 89th minute while the score was 3–3. He scored in the following penalty shoot-out which saw Scunthorpe win 6–5. He was recalled by Manchester United in January 2018.

He was one of eight players released by Manchester United at the end of the 2017–18 season. He later said that he found out via Twitter.

In June 2018, he went on trial with Shrewsbury Town.

=== Salford City ===
National League side Salford City signed Redmond on 31 January 2019. His first goal for the club came on 18 March, scoring the only goal in a 1–0 win against Aldershot Town, helping close the gap to league leaders Leyton Orient to four points. Overall, he started 11 of Salford's final 12 league fixtures as they reached the National League play-offs.

On 11 May 2019, Salford defeated Fylde 3–0 in the play-off final, with Redmond contributing heavily to the opening goal from Emmanuel Dieseruvwe; this marked the first time Salford had ever reached the Football League. It was announced at the end of May that he had been offered a new deal by the club, but had decided to pursue his career elsewhere, and would leave the club at the end of June when his contract expired.

=== Wrexham ===
On 8 June 2019, Redmond signed for Wrexham on a two-year deal. On 3 August, he made his début for Wrexham on the opening day of the National League season, starting in a 2–1 home win against Barrow. He scored his first for the club in a 1–1 draw on 18 August, a "magnificent" strike earning Wrexham a point away to Notts County. On 2 June 2022, Wrexham released six players including Redmond.

==== Kidderminster Harriers (loan) ====
On 14 January 2022, Redmond joined National League North side Kidderminster Harriers on loan until the end of the season.

=== United Arab Emirates ===
The following season, he signed for UAE Second Division League side Gulf United.

== Personal life ==
Redmond is the son of former left-back Paul Edwards, who made appearances in the English Football League for six different clubs.

== Career statistics ==
As of 15 January 2022

Appearances and goals by club, season and competition
Club	Season	League			FA Cup		League Cup		Other		Total	
Club	Season	Division	Apps	Goals	Apps	Goals	Apps	Goals	Apps	Goals	Apps	Goals
Manchester United	2017–18	Premier League	0	0	0	0	0	0	0	0	0	0
Scunthorpe United (loan)	2017–18	League One	1	0	0	0	2	0	4 (Note: Appearances in the EFL Trophy.)	0	7	0
Salford City	2018–19	National League	13	2	—		—		2 (Note: Appearances in the National League Play-off.)	0	15	2
Wrexham	2019–20	National League	20	2	3	0	—		4	1	27	3
Wrexham	2020–21	National League	2	0	0	0	—		0	0	2	0
Wrexham	2021–22	National League	3	0	0	0	—		0	0	3	0
Wrexham	Total		25	2	3	0	0	0	4	1	32	3
Career total			39	4	3	0	2	0	10	1	54	5

== Honours ==
Salford City

- National League play-offs: 2019
