= Tom Hopper (footballer) =

English footballer

Personal information
- Full name: Thomas Edward Hopper
- Date of birth: 14 December 1993 (age 32)
- Place of birth: Boston, England
- Height: 1.89 m (6 ft 2 in)
- Position: Striker

Team information
- Current team: Southend United
- Number: 14

Youth career
- 2006–2010: Boston United
- 2010–2011: Leicester City

Senior career*
Years	Team	Apps	(Gls)
2011–2015	Leicester City	0	(0)
2012–2013	→ Bury (loan)	22	(3)
2015	→ Scunthorpe United (loan)	12	(4)
2015–2018	Scunthorpe United	103	(20)
2018–2020	Southend United	28	(9)
2020–2023	Lincoln City	83	(14)
2023–2025	Colchester United	68	(5)
2025–2026	Southend United	58	(7)
- * Club domestic league appearances and goals as of 13:58 12 September 2026 (UTC)

Thomas Edward Hopper (born 14 December 1993) is an English professional footballer who most recently played as a striker for National League club Southend United.

== Club career ==
=== Early career ===
Tom Hopper began his career with Boston United. Hopper became Boston's youngest ever player, when aged 15 he came on as a substitute for goalscorer Spencer Weir-Daley for the final 13 minutes of a 2–1 Challenge Cup victory over Hucknall Town. In the summer of 2010, Hopper signed for Leicester City and immediately began impressing in the club's youth teams.

=== Leicester City ===
Hopper signed his first professional contract with Leicester City in October 2011. On 28 January 2012, Hopper was allocated the number 37 shirt and named on the substitutes bench for Leicester's FA Cup match against Swindon Town. He made his debut as an 81st-minute substitute for David Nugent. Leicester won the match 2–0. Hopper said of his debut that "It all seems like a blur, but something I have really enjoyed".

Manager Nigel Pearson was said to be impressed by the youngster. In May 2012, he was named as Leicester City's Academy Player of the Season. Hopper was given the 21 number for the 2012–13 season. On 14 September, Hopper joined Bury on a one-month loan deal. Hopper scored twice in his first six games during a month-long loan spell at Bury, including his first ever professional league goal against Stevenage and Crawley Town. On 16 October Hopper extended his loan at Bury until 3 January 2013, which was then extended for the remainder of the 2012–13 season on 4 January 2013. Hopper's loan spell was cut short and he was sent back to Leicester on 7 February 2013.

Hopper finished the season with Leicester City Development Squad & Academy, helping them to win the 2012–13 Professional Development League 2 and the HKFC International Soccer Sevens cup tournament. Hopper was allocated the number 20 shirt at the beginning of the 2013–14 season and was named as an unused substitute in Leicester's 2–1 Football League Cup win over Wycombe Wanderers on 6 August. He made his first appearance of the season in the next round of the League Cup, replacing Chris Wood in the 66th minute of a 5–2 win at Carlisle United. On 30 May 2014, Hopper signed a new two-year deal.

Hopper was an unused substitute in Leicester's first two Premier League fixtures, against Everton and Chelsea in August 2014.

=== Scunthorpe United ===
On 8 January 2015, Hopper joined League One outfit Scunthorpe United on a one-month loan. Hopper made his debut on 10 January 2015, scoring in the 4–1 victory against Walsall. After scoring 4 goals in 4 games, Hopper's loan was extended until the end on the season on 2 February 2015. Hopper was nominated for the Sky Bet League One Player of the Month award for January, missing out to Dele Alli of MK Dons. On 17 June 2015, Hopper's contract was terminated by Leicester City following a racist orgy during the club's promotional tour in Thailand. After his Leicester contract was terminated, he joined Scunthorpe on a permanent basis on 26 June 2015.

=== Southend United ===
Hopper signed for Southend United on 15 June 2018 on a three-year deal. He scored on his debut in a 3–2 defeat to Doncaster Rovers.

=== Lincoln City ===
Hopper signed for Lincoln City on 23 January 2020 for an undisclosed fee, on a contract running until 2023. On 28 July 2022, Hopper was made the captain of the club following the departure of Liam Bridcutt.

=== Colchester United ===
On 26 January 2023, Hopper joined Colchester United for an undisclosed fee.

On 11 February 2023, Hopper scored his first Colchester goal, a close range header in a 1–0 victory away at Grimsby.

On 28 January 2025, Colchester United announced that the club had cancelled Hopper's contract by mutual consent.

=== Southend United ===
On 28 January 2025, the same day as his departure from Colchester United, Hopper returned to National League club Southend United on an eighteen-month deal. He was released by the club at the end of the 25-26 season.

== Personal life ==
In May 2015, Hopper and teammates James Pearson and Adam Smith made a sex tape with local women on Leicester's tour of Thailand, which was obtained by the Sunday Mirror. The three players apologised for making the video, which included a racial epithet towards the women. Following the outcome of disciplinary proceedings, the three players had their contracts terminated.

== Career statistics ==
As of match played 7 February 2026

Club	Season	League			FA Cup		League Cup		Other		Total	
Club	Season	Division	Apps	Goals	Apps	Goals	Apps	Goals	Apps	Goals	Apps	Goals
Leicester City	2011–12	Championship	0	0	1	0	0	0	0	0	1	0
Leicester City	2012–13	Championship	0	0	0	0	0	0	0	0	0	0
Leicester City	2013–14	Championship	0	0	0	0	2	0	0	0	2	0
Leicester City	2014–15	Premier League	0	0	0	0	0	0	0	0	0	0
Leicester City	Total		0	0	1	0	2	0	0	0	3	0
Bury (loan)	2012–13	League One	22	3	0	0	2	0	0	0	24	3
Scunthorpe United (loan)	2014–15	League One	12	4	0	0	0	0	0	0	12	4
Scunthorpe United	2015–16	League One	34	8	0	0	1	0	1 (Note: Appearances in Football League Trophy)	0	36	8
Scunthorpe United	2016–17	League One	31	5	1	1	1	0	4 (Note: Appearance(s) in EFL Trophy)	0	37	6
Scunthorpe United	2017–18	League One	38	7	3	0	1	0	4 (Note: Two appearances in EFL Trophy and two in League One play-offs)	2	46	9
Scunthorpe United	Total		137	27	4	1	5	0	9	2	155	30
Southend United	2018–19	League One	14	7	0	0	0	0	0	0	14	7
Southend United	2019–20	League One	14	2	1	0	0	0	1	1	16	3
Southend United	Total		28	9	1	0	0	0	1	1	30	10
Lincoln City	2019–20	League One	8	2	0	0	0	0	0	0	8	2
Lincoln City	2020–21	League One	39	8	0	0	3	1	6 (Note: Appearance(s) in League One play-offs and EFL Trophy)	2	48	11
Lincoln City	2021–22	League One	20	2	0	0	1	1	1	1	22	4
Lincoln City	2022–23	League One	16	2	0	0	2	0	4	3	22	5
Lincoln City	Total		83	14	0	0	6	2	11	6	100	22
Colchester United	2022–23	League Two	17	1	0	0	0	0	0	0	17	1
Colchester United	2023–24	League Two	35	4	1	0	1	0	4	0	41	4
Colchester United	2024–25	League Two	16	0	1	0	2	1	4	1	23	2
Colchester United	Total		68	5	2	0	3	1	8	1	81	7
Southend United	2024–25	National League	19	2	0	0	–		3 (Note: Appearances in National League play-offs)	1	22	3
Southend United	2025–26	National League	23	0	1	0	–		0	0	24	0
Southend United	Total		42	2	1	0	0	0	3	1	46	3
Career total			358	57	9	1	16	3	32	11	415	72

== Honours ==
Southend United

- FA Trophy: 2025–26
