= 2017–18 Scunthorpe United F.C. season =

Scunthorpe United
2017–18 season
- Chairman: Peter Swann
- Manager: Graham Alexander (until 24 March); Nick Daws (caretaker, from 24 March)
- Stadium: Glanford Park
- League One: 5th
- FA Cup: Second round (eliminated by Doncaster Rovers)
- EFL Cup: Second round (eliminated by Middlesbrough)
- EFL Trophy: Second round (eliminated by Leicester City U21s)
- Top goalscorer: League: Josh Morris (11); All: Josh Morris (12)

The 2017–18 season was Scunthorpe United's 119th season in their existence and their fourth consecutive season in League One. Along with competing in League One, the club also participated in the FA Cup, EFL Cup and EFL Trophy. The season covers the period from 1 July 2017 to 30 June 2018.

== Competitions ==
=== Friendlies ===
As of 26 June 2017, Scunthorpe United have announced six pre-season friendlies against York City, Luton Town, North Ferriby United, Sunderland, Austria Salzburg. and SK Strobl.

| 8 July 2017 | North Ferriby United | 0–6 | Scunthorpe United | North Ferriby |
| 15:00 BST | | Report | Townsend 37'; Margetts 40'; Wootton 54', 77'; Burdett 56'; Burgess 87' | Stadium: Grange Lane |

| 12 July 2017 | York City | 2–2 | Scunthorpe United | York |
| 19:00 BST | Almond 6'; Rankine 48' | Report | Bishop 74'; Adelakun 76' | Stadium: Bootham Crescent |

| 13 July 2017 Lincolnshire Senior Cup | Grimsby Town | 4–0 | Scunthorpe United | Cleethorpes |
| 14:00 BST | Yussuf 10'; Boyce 38'; Cardwell 58'; Robinson 70' | Report | | Stadium: Blundell Park |

| 18 July 2017 | SK Strobl | 0–6 | Scunthorpe United | Obertraun, Austria |
| 18:00 CEST | | Report | Burgess 5'; Mantom 20'; Adelakun 32'; Morris 54' (pen.); Madden 55' van Veen 67' | Stadium: Bundessport- u Freizeitzentrum Obertraun; Referee: Simon Skowronski |

| 21 July 2017 | Austria Salzburg | 0–6 | Scunthorpe United | Salzburg, Austria |
| 18:00 CEST | | Report | Adelakun 23', 66'; Burgess 27' van Veen 44'; Morris 71'; Madden 72' | Stadium: My Phone Austria Stadion; Referee: Simon Skowronski |

| 26 July 2017 | Scunthorpe United | 0–0 | Sunderland | Scunthorpe |
| 19:30 BST | | Report | | Stadium: Glanford Park; Attendance: 2,794 |

| 29 July 2017 | Luton Town | 2–1 | Scunthorpe United | Luton |
| 15:00 BST | Collins 22' (pen.); Stacey 80' | Report | Madden 18' | Stadium: Kenilworth Road; Attendance: 1,735 |

=== League One ===
==== League table ====
| Pos | Team | Pld | W | D | L | GF | GA | GD | Pts | Promotion, qualification or relegation |
|---|---|---|---|---|---|---|---|---|---|---|
| 3 | Shrewsbury Town | 46 | 25 | 12 | 9 | 60 | 39 | +21 | 87 | Qualification for League One play-offs (Note: Four teams play for one spot and promotion to the EFL Championship.) |
| 4 | Rotherham United (O, P) | 46 | 24 | 7 | 15 | 73 | 53 | +20 | 79 | Qualification for League One play-offs |
| 5 | Scunthorpe United | 46 | 19 | 17 | 10 | 65 | 50 | +15 | 74 | Qualification for League One play-offs |
| 6 | Charlton Athletic | 46 | 20 | 11 | 15 | 58 | 51 | +7 | 71 | Qualification for League One play-offs |
| 7 | Plymouth Argyle | 46 | 19 | 11 | 16 | 58 | 59 | −1 | 68 | |

Source: BBC Sport
Rules for classification: 1) Points; 2) Goal difference; 3) Number of goals scored
(O) Play-off winners; (P) Promoted

==== Result summary ====
| Overall | | | | | | | | Home | | | | | | Away | | | | | |
| Pld | W | D | L | GF | GA | GD | Pts | W | D | L | GF | GA | GD | W | D | L | GF | GA | GD |
|---|---|---|---|---|---|---|---|---|---|---|---|---|---|---|---|---|---|---|---|
| 22 | 11 | 6 | 5 | 28 | 17 | +11 | 39 | 5 | 4 | 2 | 13 | 8 | +5 | 6 | 2 | 3 | 15 | 9 | +6 |

Last updated: 4 January 2018.

==== Results by matchday ====
| Matchday | 1 | 2 | 3 | 4 | 5 | 6 | 7 | 8 | 9 | 10 | 11 | 12 | 13 | 14 | 15 | 16 | 17 | 18 | 19 | 20 | 21 | 22 | 23 | 24 | 25 | 26 | 27 | 28 | 29 | 30 | 31 | 32 | 33 | 34 | 35 | 36 | 37 | 38 | 39 | 40 | 41 | 42 | 43 | 44 | 45 | 46 |
|---|---|---|---|---|---|---|---|---|---|---|---|---|---|---|---|---|---|---|---|---|---|---|---|---|---|---|---|---|---|---|---|---|---|---|---|---|---|---|---|---|---|---|---|---|---|---|
| Ground | H | A | H | A | A | H | H | A | H | A | A | H | A | H | H | A | H | A | A | H | A | H | H | | | | | | | | | | | | | | | | | | | | | | | |
| Result | D | D | W | W | W | D | L | W | W | D | L | L | L | D | W | W | W | W | W | W | L | D | W | | | | | | | | | | | | | | | | | | | | | | | |
| Position | 12 | 16 | 9 | 6 | 4 | 5 | 11 | 6 | 5 | 5 | 7 | 8 | 12 | 12 | 8 | 5 | 5 | 4 | 3 | 3 | 5 | 5 | | | | | | | | | | | | | | | | | | | | | | | | |

Updated to match(es) played on 4 January 2018. Source: Statto.com
A = Away; H = Home; W = Win; D = Draw; L = Loss

==== Matches ====
| 5 August 2017 1 | Scunthorpe United | 1–1 | AFC Wimbledon | Scunthorpe |
| 15:00 BST | Townsend 6' | Report | Abdou 67' (yellow card) 68' | Stadium: Glanford Park; Attendance: 4,398; Referee: Michael Salisbury |

| 12 August 2017 2 | Rochdale | 1–1 | Scunthorpe United | Spotland |
| 15:00 BST | Davies 55' | Report | Holmes 63' | Stadium: Spotland Stadium; Attendance: 3,218; Referee: Ross Joyce |

| 19 August 2017 3 | Scunthorpe United | 1–0 | Oxford United | Scunthorpe |
| 15:00 BST | Morris 83'; Hopper (yellow card) 85' | Report | Ruffels (yellow card) 49'; Henry (yellow card) 72' | Stadium: Glanford Park; Attendance: 4,205; Referee: Darren Handley |

| 26 August 2017 4 | Plymouth Argyle | 0–4 | Scunthorpe United | Plymouth |
| 15:00 BST | Sarcevic (red card) 45+3' | Report | Madden 27', 68' (yellow card) 45+3'; Bishop (yellow card) 45+2'; Gilks (yellow card) 53'; Townsend (yellow card) 56'; Ojo (yellow card) 65'; Hopper 77'; Morris 90+4' | Stadium: Home Park; Attendance: 9,605; Referee: Chris Sarginson |

| 2 September 2017 5 | Bury | 0–1 | Scunthorpe United | Bury |
| 15:00 BST | Cameron (yellow card) 45+2' | Report | Wallace (yellow card) 24'; Sutton (yellow card) 82'; Morris 86' (yellow card) 88' | Stadium: Gigg Lane; Attendance: 4,055; Referee: Eddie Ilderton |

| 9 September 2017 6 | Scunthorpe United | 0–0 | Blackpool | Scunthorpe |
| 15:00 BST | Wallace (yellow card) 57' | Report | Ryan (yellow card) 38'; Vassell (yellow card) 66' | Stadium: Glanford Park; Attendance: 4,290; Referee: Andy Haines |

| 12 September 2017 7 | Scunthorpe United | 0–1 | Blackburn Rovers | Scunthorpe |
| 19:45 BST | | Report | Antonsson 58'; Graham (yellow card) 90+3' | Stadium: Glanford Park; Attendance: 4,330; Referee: Seb Stockbridge |

| 17 September 2017 8 | Doncaster Rovers | 0–1 | Scunthorpe United | Doncaster |
| 15:00 BST | Whiteman (yellow card) 32'; Marquis (yellow card) 47' | Report | Novak 10'; Bishop (yellow card) 55' | Stadium: Keepmoat Stadium; Attendance: 9,227; Referee: David Webb |

| 23 September 2017 9 | Scunthorpe United | 2–0 | Portsmouth | Scunthorpe |
| 15:00 BST | Novak 12'; Holmes 33' | Report | | Stadium: Glanford Park; Attendance: 4,685; Referee: Anthony Blackhouse |

| 26 September 2017 10 | Gillingham | 0–0 | Scunthorpe United | Gillingham |
| 15:00 BST | | Report | | Stadium: Priestfield Stadium; Attendance: 4,002; Referee: Anthony Coggins |

| 30 September 2017 11 | Shrewsbury Town | 2–0 | Scunthorpe United | Shrewsbury |
| 15:00 BST | Payne 24'; Nolan (yellow card) 35'; Morris 87' | Report | Bishop (yellow card) 36'; Madden (yellow card) 90+1' | Stadium: Gay Meadow; Attendance: 5,759; Referee: Graham Horwood |

| 7 October 2017 12 | Scunthorpe United | 1–2 | Wigan Athletic | Scunthorpe |
| 15:00 BST | Morris (yellow card) 28'; Murray Wallace (yellow card) 33' van Veen (yellow card) 77'; Ojo 90' | Report | Burn 51'; Evans (red card) 56'; Powell 74'; Power (yellow card) 77' | Stadium: Glanford Park; Attendance: 4,480; Referee: Robert Lewis |

| 14 October 2017 13 | Rotherham United | 2–0 | Scunthorpe United | Rotherham |
| 15:00 BST | Vaulks 37'; Ihiekwe (yellow card) 40'; Moore 71'; Williams (yellow card) 90' | Report | Townsend (yellow card) 78' | Stadium: New York Stadium; Attendance: 9,167; Referee: Darren Bond |

| 17 October 2017 14 | Scunthorpe United | 1–1 | Fleetwood Town | Scunthorpe |
| 19:45 BST | Novak 18' | Report | Bolger (yellow card) 35'; Hiwula 85' | Stadium: Glanford Park; Attendance: 3,120; Referee: Peter Bankes |

| 21 October 2017 15 | Scunthorpe United | 2–1 | Peterborough United | Scunthorpe |
| 15:00 BST | Holmes (yellow card) 30'; Bishop (yellow card) 34'; Clarke (yellow card) 63'; Morris 87' (pen.) | Report | Hughes 51'; Novak 79'; Shepard (yellow card) 84'; Bond (yellow card) 87' | Stadium: Glanford Park; Attendance: 4,275; Referee: Mark Heywood |

| 28 October 2017 16 | Oldham Athletic | 2–3 | Scunthorpe United | Oldham |
| 15:00 BST | Fané (yellow card) 31'; Clarke 45+1'; Davies 81' | Report | Hopper 5'; Morris 10'; Gilks (yellow card) 61'; Holmes 83'; McArdle (yellow card) 87' | Stadium: Boundary Park; Attendance: 4,331; Referee: Scott Oldham |

| 11 November 2017 17 | Scunthorpe United | 1–0 | Bristol Rovers | Scunthorpe |
| 15:00 GMT | Ojo (yellow card) 42'; Bishop (yellow card) 57' (goal) 90+4' | Report | Nichols (yellow card) 57'; Leadbitter (yellow card) 87' | Stadium: Glanford Park; Attendance: 4,210; Referee: Seb Stockbridge |

| 18 November 2017 18 | Northampton Town | 0–3 | Scunthorpe United | Northampton |
| 15:00 GMT | Taylor (yellow card) 55' | Report | Burgess 56'; Holmes 58', 74' | Stadium: Sixfields Stadium; Attendance: 5,181; Referee: Michael Salisbury |

| 21 November 2017 19 | Bradford City | 1–2 | Scunthorpe United | Bradford |
| 19:45 GMT | Taylor 44' | Report | Wallace (yellow card) 19'; Holmes 45+1'; Adelakun 69'; Bishop (yellow card) 73'; Hopper (yellow card) 90+1' | Stadium: Valley Parade; Attendance: 19,163; Referee: Scott Duncan |

| 25 November 2017 20 | Scunthorpe United | 2–0 | Charlton Athletic | Scunthorpe |
| 15:00 GMT | Morris 60', 63'; Adelakun (yellow card) 69'; Hopper (yellow card) 90+2' | Report | Ngoyo (yellow card) 90+3' | Stadium: Glanford Park; Attendance: 4,307; Referee: Kevin Johnson |

| 9 December 2017 21 | Walsall | 1–0 | Scunthorpe United | Bescot |
| 15:00 GMT | Morris 13' | Report | Holmes (yellow card) 16'; Sutton (yellow card) 85' | Stadium: Bescot Stadium; Attendance: 3,865; Referee: Scott Oldham |

| 16 December 2017 22 | Scunthorpe United | 2–2 | Milton Keynes Dons | Scunthorpe |
| 15:00 GMT | Adelakun 27' van Veen 43'; Morris (yellow card) 45+3'; Bishop (red card) 45+4' | Report | Ebanks-Landell (yellow card) 9'; Williams (yellow card) 31'; Agard 41'; Aneke 66' | Stadium: Glanford Park; Attendance: 3,569 |

| 23 December 2017 23 | Scunthorpe United | 3–1 | Southend United | Scunthorpe |
| 15:00 GMT | van Veen 32'; Townsend 63'; Turner 86' (o.g.) | Report | Demetriou 25'; Wordsworth (yellow card) 35' | Stadium: Glanford Park; Attendance: 4,040 |

| 26 December 2017 24 | Blackpool | 2–3 | Scunthorpe United | Blackpool |
| 15:00 GMT | Ryan (yellow card) 22'; Philliskirk 25'; D'Almeida (yellow card) 26'; Longstaff 88'; Robertson (yellow card) 90+4' | Report | Hopper 2'; Holmes 8', (yellow card) 74'; Adelakun 46' | Stadium: Bloomfield Road; Attendance: 3,446 |

| 30 December 2017 25 | Blackburn Rovers | 2–2 | Scunthorpe United | Blackburn |
| 15:00 GMT | Graham 6', 47'; Smallwood (yellow card) 75'; Dack (yellow card) 84'; Bennett (yellow card) 88' | Report | van Veen 12'; Hopper (yellow card) 38'; Townsend 56' | Stadium: Ewood Park; Attendance: 12,784 |

| 1 January 2018 26 | Scunthorpe United | 1–0 | Bury | Scunthorpe |
| 15:00 GMT | Ojo (yellow card) 45'; Goode 86'; Sutton (yellow card) 90+2' | Report | Reilly (yellow card) 45+3'; Bunn (yellow card) 79' | Stadium: Glanford Park; Attendance: 4,270 |

| 6 January 2018 P | Scunthorpe United | v | Doncaster Rovers | Scunthorpe |
| 15:00 GMT | | | | Stadium: Glanford Park |
Note: On 8 December, it was announced the home fixture against Doncaster Rovers was rearranged due to FA Cup involvement.

| 13 January 2018 27 | Portsmouth | 1–1 | Scunthorpe United | Portsmouth |
| 15:00 GMT | Lowe 15'; Clarke (yellow card) 78'; Hawkins (yellow card) 89' | Report | van Veen 53'; Bishop (yellow card) 76'; Adelakun (yellow card) 82' | Stadium: Fratton Park; Attendance: 17,741; Referee: (England) Charles Breakspear |

| 20 January 2018 28 | Scunthorpe United | 1–3 | Gillingham | Scunthorpe |
| 15:00 GMT | van Veen (yellow card) 38'; Morris 52' | Report | Martin 25'; Reilly (yellow card) 41'; Eaves (yellow card) 43' (goal) 73'; Parker 68'; Ogilvie (yellow card) 90' | Stadium: Glanford Park; Attendance: 4,905; Referee: Carl Boyeson |

| 23 January 2018 29 | Scunthorpe United | 1–1 | Doncaster Rovers | Scunthorpe |
| 19:45 GMT | Hopper 3'; Bishop (yellow card) 30'; Wallace (yellow card) 40' | Report | Rowe (yellow card) 24'; Beestin 90+6'; Beestin (yellow card) 90+7' | Stadium: Glanford Park; Attendance: 5,193; Referee: Eddie Ilderton |

| 27 January 2018 30 | Southend United | 3–2 | Scunthorpe United | Southend-on-Sea |
| | McLaughlin (yellow card) 28'; Kightly 37'; McLaughlin 53'; Turner 90+2' (yellow card) 90+2' | Report | Hopper 12'; Burgess (yellow card) 47' (yellow-red card) 90+1'; Goode (yellow card) 52' van Veen 56'; Hopper (yellow card) 68' | Stadium: Roots Hall; Attendance: 6,723; Referee: Craig Hicks |

| 3 February 2018 31 | Fleetwood Town | 2–3 | Scunthorpe United | Fleetwood Town |
| | Madden (yellow card) 30'; Eastham (red card) 42'; Hunter 45'; O'Connor (yellow card) 45+4'; Grant 67'; Pond (yellow card) 77' | Report | Morris 25', 42' (pen.); Toney 78' | Stadium: Highbury Stadium; Attendance: 2,901; Referee: Mark Heywood |

| 10 February 2018 32 | Scunthorpe United | 1–2 | Rotherham United | Scunthorpe |
| 15:00 GMT | Novak 72' (yellow card) 90+5'; Holmes (yellow card) 86'; Vermijl (yellow card) 76' | Report | Newell 31'; Smith (yellow card) 55'; Ajayi 70' (yellow card) 80'; Emmanuel (yellow card) 90'; Forde (yellow card) 90+8' | Stadium: Glanford Park; Attendance: 6,359; Referee: Graham Salisbury |

| 13 February 2018 33 | Peterborough United | 2–2 | Scunthorpe United | Peterborough |
| 19:45 GMT | Maddison 2'; Morias 45+2' | Report | Toney 34'; Yates 60' | Stadium: London Road Stadium; Attendance: 4,397; Referee: Trevor Kettle |

| 17 February 2018 34 | Scunthorpe United | 2–2 | Northampton Town | Scunthorpe |
| 15:00 GMT | Ojo 31'; Wallace 77' | Report | Long 13'; O'Toole 57' | Stadium: Glanford Park; Attendance: 4,157; Referee: Andrew Madley |

| 24 February 2018 35 | Bristol Rovers | 1–1 | Scunthorpe United | Horfield |
| 15:00 GMT | Harrison 90+1' | Report | Hopper (yellow card) 40'; McGeehan (yellow card) 51'; Gilks (yellow card) 59'; Holmes 61' | Stadium: Memorial Stadium; Attendance: 8,346; Referee: Darren Handley |

| 3 March 2018 36 | Scunthorpe United | 0–2 | Oldham Athletic | Scunthorpe |
| 15:00 GMT | Williams (yellow card) 80' | Report | Gerrard (yellow card) 38'; McEleney 78'; Doyle 82' | Stadium: Glanford Park; Attendance: 3,715; Referee: John Busby |

| 10 March 2018 37 | Wigan Athletic | 3–3 | Scunthorpe United | Wigan |
| 15:00 GMT | Dunkley 13'; Grigg 43'; Roberts 87'; Burn (yellow card) 90+2'; Bruce (yellow card) 90+2' | Report | Hopper 16', 45+2'; Toney 53'; Holmes (yellow card) 77' | Stadium: DW Stadium; Attendance: 8,438; Referee: Dean Whitestone |

| 17 March 2018 38 | Scunthorpe United | 1–2 | Shrewsbury Town | Scunthorpe |
| 15:00 GMT | Morris 8'; McArdle (yellow card) 62'; Toney (yellow card) 75' | Report | Nsiala (yellow card) 8'; C. Morris (yellow card) 43'; Nolan 51' (yellow card) 84'; Payne 59' (pen.) | Stadium: Glanford Park; Attendance: 3,824; Referee: Michael Salisbury |

| 24 March 2018 39 | Scunthorpe United | 1–1 | Rochdale | Scunthorpe |
| 15:00 GMT | Toney 51'; Ojo (yellow card) 68' | Report | Camps 20'; Rathbone (yellow card) 35'; Hart (yellow card) 50'; Andrew (yellow card) 68' | Stadium: Glanford Park; Attendance: 3,789; Referee: John Brooks |

| 30 March 2018 40 | Oxford United | 1–1 | Scunthorpe United | Oxford |
| 12:45 BST | Toney 12' | Report | Henry 56' (pen.) | Stadium: Kassam Stadium; Attendance: 7,479 (268 away); Referee: Darren Drysdale |

| 7 April 2018 41 | AFC Wimbledon | 1–1 | Scunthorpe United | Kingston upon Thames |
| 15:00 BST | Nightingale 4'; Oshilaja (yellow card) 26' | Report | McArdle (yellow card) 82'; Novak 84'; Wallace (yellow card) 90' | Stadium: Kingsmeadow; Attendance: 4,055; Referee: Tom Nield |

| 14 April 2018 42 | Charlton Athletic | 0–1 | Scunthorpe United | Charlton |
| 15:00 BST | | Report | Toney 31' | Stadium: The Valley; Attendance: 11,877; Referee: Graham Salisbury |

| 21 April 2018 43 | Scunthorpe United | 1–0 | Walsall | Scunthorpe |
| | McArdle (yellow card) 74'; Yates 76' | Report | Chambers (yellow card) 66' | Stadium: Glanford Park; Attendance: 4,083; Referee: David Webb |

| 28 April 2018 44 | Milton Keynes Dons | 0–2 | Scunthorpe United | Milton Keynes |
| | Williams (yellow card) 50'; Aneke (yellow card) 72' | Report | McArdle 20'; Toney 35' | Stadium: Stadium mk Attendance: 9,578; Referee: John Busby |

| 1 May 2018 45 | Scunthorpe United | 2–0 | Plymouth Argyle | Scunthorpe |
| 19:45 GMT | Adelakun 32'; Holmes (yellow card) 45'; Toney 60' | Report | | Stadium: Glanford Park; Attendance: 4,712; Referee: Ben Toner |

| 5 May 2018 46 | Scunthorpe United | 1–1 | Bradford City | Scunthorpe |
| 17:30 GMT | Townsend 59' | Report | Kilgallon 56' | Stadium: Glanford Park; Attendance: 5,452 |

=== League One play-offs ===
| 12 May 2018 Semi-Final 1st Leg | Scunthorpe United | 2–2 | Rotherham United | Scunthorpe |
| 12:30 BST | Ihiekwe 18' (o.g.); Wallace (yellow card) 38'; McGeehan 88' | Report | Taylor 17', (yellow card) 55'; Wood (yellow card) 40'; Palmer (yellow card) 50'; Newell 64' | Stadium: Glanford Park; Attendance: 6,591; Referee: Tim Robinson |

| 16 May 2018 Semi-Final 2nd Leg | Rotherham United | 2–0 (4–2 agg.) | Scunthorpe United | Rotherham |
| 19:45 BST | Wood 45+2'; Vaulks 63'; Forde (yellow card) 90' | Report | Toney (yellow card) 52'; McArdle (yellow card) 53' (red card) 77' | Stadium: New York Stadium; Attendance: 11,061; Referee: Scott Duncan |

=== FA Cup ===
On 16 October 2017, Scunthorpe United were drawn away to Northampton Town in the first round. A 0–0 draw meant a replay would be played at Glanford Park.

| 4 November 2017 First round | Northampton Town | 0–0 | Scunthorpe United | Northampton |
| 15:00 GMT | Hoskins (yellow card) 67' | Report | Crofts (yellow card) 23'; Holmes (yellow card) 77' van Veen (yellow card) 82' | Stadium: Sixfields Stadium; Attendance: 2,820; Referee: Robert Jones |

| 14 November 2017 First round replay | Scunthorpe United | 1–0 | Northampton Town | Scunthorpe |
| 19:45 GMT | Adelakun 32'; Ojo (yellow card) 80' | Report | McWilliams (yellow card) 57' | Stadium: Glanford Park; Attendance: 1,880; Referee: Andy Haines |

| 3 December 2017 Second round | Doncaster Rovers | 3–0 | Scunthorpe United | Doncaster |
| 14:00 GMT | Rowe 16', 67'; Whiteman (yellow card) 75'; Mandeville (yellow card) 78' (goal) 90+2' | Report | Hopper (yellow card) 9'; Crofts (yellow card) 13'; Church (yellow card) 79' | Stadium: Keepmoat Stadium; Attendance: 5,251; Referee: Mark Heywood |

=== EFL Cup ===
On 16 June 2017, Scunthorpe United were drawn at home to Notts County in the first round. An away trip to Middlesbrough was drawn out for the second round.

| 8 August 2017 First round | Scunthorpe United | 3–3 (a.e.t.) (6–5 p) | Notts County | Scunthorpe |
| 19:45 BST | Madden 69' (pen.), 105+1'; Holmes 86' | Report | Grant 22'; Brisley 90+2'; Yates 117' | Stadium: Glanford Park; Attendance: 1,874; Referee: David Webb |
| | Penalties |
| | Madden (penalty scored); van Veen (penalty scored); Adelakun (penalty scored); Townsend (penalty scored); Redmond (penalty scored); Holmes (penalty scored) | | Smith (penalty scored); Thompson (penalty scored); Milsom (penalty scored); Brisley (penalty scored); Forte (penalty scored); Toolte (penalty missed) |

| 22 August 2017 Second round | Middlesbrough | 3–0 | Scunthorpe United | Middlesbrough |
| 19:45 BST | Fábio 17'; Baker 30'; Fletcher 55' | Report | | Stadium: Riverside Stadium; Attendance: 12,679; Referee: Andy Madley |

=== EFL Trophy ===
On 12 July 2017, Scunthorpe were drawn against Doncaster Rovers, Grimsby Town and Sunderland U23s in Northern Group H. After winning the group, Scunthorpe were handed a home tie against Leicester City U21s in the second round.

| Pos | Lge | Team | Pld | W | PW | PL | L | GF | GA | GD | Pts | Qualification |
|---|---|---|---|---|---|---|---|---|---|---|---|---|
| 1 | L1 | Scunthorpe United (Q) | 3 | 2 | 0 | 1 | 0 | 6 | 3 | +3 | 7 | Round 2 |
| 2 | L1 | Doncaster Rovers (Q) | 3 | 1 | 2 | 0 | 0 | 3 | 2 | +1 | 7 | Round 2 |
| 3 | L2 | Grimsby Town (E) | 3 | 0 | 0 | 2 | 1 | 3 | 4 | −1 | 2 | |
| 4 | ACA | Sunderland U21 (E) | 3 | 0 | 1 | 0 | 2 | 2 | 5 | −3 | 2 | |

Updated to match(es) played on 8 October 2017. Source: EFL.com
(E) Eliminated; (Q) Qualified to the phase indicated

| 29 August 2017 Group Game 1 | Scunthorpe United | 3–1 | Sunderland U21s | Scunthorpe |
| 19:45 BST | van Veen 3'; Holmes 45+4' (yellow card) 86'; Adelakun (yellow card) 82'; Morris 90' | Report | Love (yellow card) 62'; Greenwood 65' | Stadium: Glanford Park; Attendance: 1,127 |

| 3 October 2017 Group Game 2 | Scunthorpe United | 2–1 | Grimsby Town | Scunthorpe |
| 19:45 BST | Madden (yellow card) 20'; Hopper 43', 80'; Redmond (yellow card) 50' van Veen (yellow card) 90+2' | Report | Jaiyesimi 32' | Stadium: Glanford Park; Attendance: 1,987; Referee: Tom Nield |

| 31 October 2017 Group Game 3 | Doncaster Rovers | 1–1 (3–2 p) | Scunthorpe United | Doncaster |
| 19:30 GMT | Mandeville 37' | Report | Lewis 55'; Hopper (yellow card) 76'; Adelakun (yellow card) 83' | Stadium: Keepmoat Stadium; Attendance: 1,717; Referee: Ben Toner |
| | Penalties |
| | Mason (penalty scored); Beestin (penalty missed); Fletcher (penalty missed); Mandeville (penalty scored); Ben Khémis (penalty scored) | | van Veen (penalty scored); Madden (penalty missed); Lewis (penalty missed); Adelakun (penalty scored); Goode (penalty missed) |

| 5 December 2017 Second round | Scunthorpe United | 1–2 | Leicester City U21s | Scunthorpe |
| 19:45 GMT | Madden (yellow card) 28' van Veen 45+1'; Sutton (yellow card) 90+3' | Report | Thomas 3'; Hughes 12'; Choudhury (yellow card) 45'; Muskwe (yellow card) 90' | Stadium: Glanford Park; Attendance: 824; Referee: Trevor Kettle |

== Squad ==
| No. | Name | Pos. | Nat. | Place of Birth | Age | Apps | Goals | Signed from | Date Signed | Fee | Contract |
Goalkeepers
| 1 | Matt Gilks | GK | (Scotland) | Rochdale | 44 | 40 | 0 | Wigan Athletic | 1 July 2017 | Free | 2019 |
| 31 | Rory Watson | GK | (England) | | 30 | 7 | 0 | Hull City | 31 January 2017 | Free | 2020 |
| 41 | Adam Kelsey | GK | (England) | Kingston upon Hull | 35 | 0 | 0 | Academy | 26 January 2017 | Trainee | 2019 |
Defenders
| 2 | Jordan Clarke | RB | (England) | Coventry | 34 | 113 | 3 | Coventry City | 10 January 2015 | Undisclosed | Undisclosed |
| 3 | Conor Townsend | LB | (England) | Hessle | 33 | 84 | 4 | Hull City | 6 January 2016 | Free | 2018 |
| 5 | Murray Wallace | CB | (Scotland) | Glasgow | 33 | 136 | 5 | Huddersfield Town | 2 January 2016 | Free | 2019 |
| 18 | Marnick Vermijl | RB | (Belgium) | Peer | 34 | 2 | 0 | Preston North End | 31 January 2018 | Loan | 2018 |
| 20 | Charlie Goode | CB | (England) | Watford | 31 | 59 | 3 | Hendon | 10 June 2015 | Free | 2018 |
| 21 | Cameron Burgess | CB | (Australia) | Aberdeen | 31 | 31 | 2 | Fulham | 1 July 2017 | Undisclosed | 2020 |
| 23 | Rory McArdle | CB | (England) | Sheffield | 39 | 34 | 0 | Bradford City | 1 July 2017 | Free | 2020 |
| 33 | Lewis Butroid | LB | (England) | | 28 | 11 | 0 | Academy | 26 January 2017 | Trainee | 2019 |
Midfielders
| 4 | Andrew Crofts | CM | (Wales) (England) | Chatham | 42 | 6 | 0 | Charlton Athletic | 1 September 2017 | Undisclosed | 2018 |
| 6 | Funso Ojo | DM | (Belgium) | Antwerp | 35 | 40 | 2 | Willem II | 18 July 2017 | Free | 2020 |
| 11 | Josh Morris | LM | (England) | Preston | 35 | 93 | 32 | Bradford City | 1 July 2016 | Free | 2019 |
| 12 | Neal Bishop | CM | (England) | Stockton-on-Tees | 45 | 171 | 12 | Blackpool | 19 June 2014 | Free | 2018 |
| 15 | Clayton Lewis | AM | (New Zealand) | Wellington | 29 | 4 | 1 | Auckland City FC | 28 September 2017 | Free | 2018 |
| 16 | Hakeeb Adelakun | LM | (England) | Hackney | 30 | 162 | 19 | Academy | 1 July 2012 | Trainee | 2018 |
| 19 | Duane Holmes | RM | (United States) | Columbus | 32 | 85 | 13 | Huddersfield Town | 7 July 2016 | Free | 2018 |
| 22 | Levi Sutton | CM | (England) | Scunthorpe | 30 | 28 | 0 | Academy | 1 July 2016 | Trainee | 2018 |
| 24 | Ryan Yates | CM | (England) | Nottingham | 28 | 9 | 1 | Nottingham Forest | 11 January 2018 | Loan | 2018 |
| 26 | Cameron McGeehan | CM | (Northern Ireland) | Kingston upon Thames | 31 | 7 | 0 | Barnsley | 4 January 2018 | Loan | 2018 |
Forwards
| 7 | Luke Williams | SS | (England) | Middlesbrough | 33 | 52 | 9 | Middlesbrough | 2 July 2015 | Undisclosed | 2018 |
| 9 | Ivan Toney | CF | (England) | Northampton | 30 | 10 | 4 | Newcastle United | 11 January 2018 | Loan | 2018 |
| 13 | Jonny Margetts | CF | (England) | Doncaster | 33 | 4 | 1 | Lincoln City | 31 August 2016 | Undisclosed | Undisclosed |
| 14 | Tom Hopper | CF | (England) | Boston | 32 | 125 | 27 | Leicester City | 26 June 2015 | Free | Undisclosed |
| 17 | Lee Novak | CF | (England) | Newcastle upon Tyne | 38 | 28 | 5 | Charlton Athletic | 31 August 2017 | Free | 2019 |
| 28 | Jack Dyche | CF | (England) | Leeds | 20 | 0 | 0 | Academy | 17 April 2016 | Trainee | 2018 |
| 29 | Kyle Wootton | CF | (England) | Epworth | 30 | 43 | 5 | Academy | 1 August 2014 | Trainee | 2018 |
| 35 | Leslie Sackey | CB | (Ghana) | | 18 | 0 | 0 | Academy | 1 July 2017 | Trainee | 2018 |
On Loan
| 8 | Sam Mantom | CM | (England) | Stourbridge | 34 | 46 | 3 | Walsall | 1 July 2016 | Free | 2019 |

== Statistics ==
As of 25 March 2018

| No. | Pos | Nat | Player | Total | | League One | | FA Cup | | League Cup | | League Trophy | |
| No. | Pos | Nat | Player | Apps | Goals | Apps | Goals | Apps | Goals | Apps | Goals | Apps | Goals |
|---|---|---|---|---|---|---|---|---|---|---|---|---|---|
| 1 | GK | (Scotland) SCO | Matt Gilks | 40 | 0 | 35+0 | 0 | 3+0 | 0 | 2+0 | 0 | 0+0 | 0 |
| 2 | DF | (England) ENG | Jordan Clarke | 22 | 0 | 14+3 | 0 | 2+0 | 0 | 1+0 | 0 | 2+0 | 0 |
| 3 | DF | (England) ENG | Conor Townsend | 26 | 3 | 17+6 | 3 | 1+0 | 0 | 2+0 | 0 | 0+0 | 0 |
| 4 | MF | (Wales) WAL | Andrew Crofts | 6 | 0 | 1+3 | 0 | 2+0 | 0 | 0+0 | 0 | 0+0 | 0 |
| 5 | DF | (Scotland) SCO | Murray Wallace | 45 | 1 | 39+0 | 1 | 3+0 | 0 | 2+0 | 0 | 1+0 | 0 |
| 6 | MF | (Belgium) BEL | Funso Ojo | 40 | 2 | 35+1 | 2 | 2+0 | 0 | 1+0 | 0 | 1+0 | 0 |
| 7 | FW | (England) ENG | Luke Williams | 2 | 0 | 0+2 | 0 | 0+0 | 0 | 0+0 | 0 | 0+0 | 0 |
| 9 | FW | (England) ENG | Ivan Toney | 10 | 4 | 7+3 | 4 | 0+0 | 0 | 0+0 | 0 | 0+0 | 0 |
| 11 | MF | (England) ENG | Josh Morris | 42 | 12 | 36+1 | 11 | 2+0 | 0 | 2+0 | 0 | 0+1 | 1 |
| 12 | MF | (England) ENG | Neal Bishop | 33 | 1 | 30+1 | 1 | 1+0 | 0 | 1+0 | 0 | 0+0 | 0 |
| 14 | FW | (England) ENG | Tom Hopper | 39 | 9 | 26+7 | 7 | 3+0 | 0 | 0+1 | 0 | 1+1 | 2 |
| 15 | MF | (New Zealand) NZL | Clayton Lewis | 4 | 1 | 1+2 | 0 | 0+0 | 0 | 0+0 | 0 | 1+0 | 1 |
| 16 | MF | (England) ENG | Hakeeb Adelakun | 40 | 4 | 22+10 | 3 | 3+0 | 1 | 1+1 | 0 | 2+1 | 0 |
| 17 | FW | (England) ENG | Lee Novak | 27 | 5 | 15+11 | 5 | 1+0 | 0 | 0+0 | 0 | 0+0 | 0 |
| 18 | DF | (Belgium) BEL | Marnick Vermijl | 2 | 0 | 2+0 | 0 | 0+0 | 0 | 0+0 | 0 | 0+0 | 0 |
| 19 | MF | (United States) USA | Duane Holmes | 46 | 9 | 28+11 | 7 | 2+1 | 0 | 1+1 | 1 | 1+1 | 1 |
| 20 | DF | (England) ENG | Charlie Goode | 18 | 1 | 10+3 | 1 | 1+1 | 0 | 1+0 | 0 | 2+0 | 0 |
| 21 | DF | (Australia) AUS | Cameron Burgess | 31 | 2 | 21+3 | 2 | 3+0 | 0 | 0+1 | 0 | 3+0 | 0 |
| 22 | MF | (England) ENG | Levi Sutton | 16 | 0 | 12+2 | 0 | 0+0 | 0 | 1+0 | 0 | 1+0 | 0 |
| 23 | DF | (England) ENG | Rory McArdle | 34 | 0 | 29+0 | 0 | 2+1 | 0 | 2+0 | 0 | 0+0 | 0 |
| 24 | MF | (England) ENG | Ryan Yates | 9 | 1 | 7+2 | 1 | 0+0 | 0 | 0+0 | 0 | 0+0 | 0 |
| 26 | MF | (Northern Ireland) NIR | Cameron McGeehan | 7 | 0 | 2+5 | 0 | 0+0 | 0 | 0+0 | 0 | 0+0 | 0 |
| 29 | FW | (England) ENG | Kyle Wootton | 1 | 0 | 0+1 | 0 | 0+0 | 0 | 0+0 | 0 | 0+0 | 0 |
| 31 | GK | (England) ENG | Rory Watson | 7 | 0 | 4+0 | 0 | 0+0 | 0 | 0+0 | 0 | 3+0 | 0 |
| 33 | DF | (England) ENG | Lewis Butroid | 10 | 0 | 6+1 | 0 | 0+0 | 0 | 0+0 | 0 | 3+0 | 0 |
Player(s) out on loan:
| 8 | MF | (England) ENG | Sam Mantom | 11 | 0 | 1+6 | 0 | 0+0 | 0 | 2+0 | 0 | 2+0 | 0 |
Player(s) who left the club during the season:
| 9 | FW | (Republic of Ireland) IRL | Paddy Madden | 26 | 4 | 15+5 | 2 | 1+0 | 0 | 2+0 | 2 | 2+1 | 0 |
| 10 | FW | (Netherlands) NED | Kevin van Veen | 28 | 6 | 13+8 | 5 | 0+3 | 0 | 1+0 | 0 | 3+0 | 1 |
| 18 | MF | (England) ENG | Devonte Redmond | 6 | 0 | 0+1 | 0 | 0+0 | 0 | 0+2 | 0 | 3+0 | 0 |
| 30 | FW | (Wales) WAL | Simon Church | 6 | 0 | 0+4 | 0 | 0+1 | 0 | 0+0 | 0 | 1+0 | 0 |

=== Goals record ===
As of 25 March 2018

| Rank | No. | Nat. | Po. | Name | League One | FA Cup | League Cup | League Trophy | Total |
|---|---|---|---|---|---|---|---|---|---|
| 1 | 11 | (England) | LM | Josh Morris | 11 | 0 | 0 | 1 | 12 |
| 2 | 14 | (England) | CF | Tom Hopper | 7 | 0 | 0 | 2 | 9 |
| 2 | 19 | (United States) | LM | Duane Holmes | 7 | 0 | 1 | 1 | 9 |
| 4 | — | (Netherlands) | CF | Kevin van Veen | 5 | 0 | 0 | 1 | 6 |
| 5 | 17 | (England) | CF | Lee Novak | 5 | 0 | 0 | 0 | 5 |
| 6 | 16 | (England) | LW | Hakeeb Adelakun | 3 | 1 | 0 | 0 | 4 |
| 6 | — | (Republic of Ireland) | CF | Paddy Madden | 2 | 0 | 2 | 0 | 4 |
| 8 | 3 | (England) | LB | Conor Townsend | 3 | 0 | 0 | 0 | 4 |
| 8 | 9 | (England) | CF | Ivan Toney | 4 | 0 | 0 | 0 | 4 |
| 10 | 6 | (Belgium) | DM | Funso Ojo | 2 | 0 | 0 | 0 | 2 |
| 10 | 21 | (Australia) | CB | Cameron Burgess | 2 | 0 | 0 | 0 | 2 |
| 12 | 5 | (Scotland) | CB | Murray Wallace | 1 | 0 | 0 | 0 | 1 |
| 12 | 12 | (England) | CM | Neal Bishop | 1 | 0 | 0 | 0 | 1 |
| 12 | 15 | (New Zealand) | CM | Clayton Lewis | 0 | 0 | 0 | 1 | 1 |
| 12 | 20 | (England) | CB | Charlie Goode | 1 | 0 | 0 | 0 | 1 |
| 12 | 24 | (England) | CM | Ryan Yates | 1 | 0 | 0 | 0 | 1 |
| Total | | | | | 54 | 1 | 3 | 6 | 64 |

=== Disciplinary record ===
As of 25 March 2018

| Rank | No. | Nat. | Po. | Name | League One | | | FA Cup | | | League Cup | | | League Trophy | | | Total | | |
| Rank | No. | Nat. | Po. | Name | Yellow card | (yellow card) (yellow-red card) | Red card | Yellow card | (yellow card) (yellow-red card) | Red card | Yellow card | (yellow card) (yellow-red card) | Red card | Yellow card | (yellow card) (yellow-red card) | Red card | Yellow card | (yellow card) (yellow-red card) | Red card |
|---|---|---|---|---|---|---|---|---|---|---|---|---|---|---|---|---|---|---|---|
| 1 | 12 | (England) | CM | Neal Bishop | 8 | 0 | 1 | 0 | 0 | 0 | 0 | 0 | 0 | 0 | 0 | 0 | 8 | 0 | 1 |
| 2 | 14 | (England) | CF | Tom Hopper | 6 | 0 | 0 | 1 | 0 | 0 | 0 | 0 | 0 | 0 | 0 | 0 | 7 | 0 | 0 |
| 2 | 19 | (United States) | RM | Duane Holmes | 5 | 0 | 0 | 1 | 0 | 0 | 0 | 0 | 0 | 1 | 0 | 0 | 7 | 0 | 0 |
| 4 | 5 | (Scotland) | CB | Murray Wallace | 5 | 0 | 0 | 0 | 0 | 0 | 0 | 0 | 0 | 0 | 0 | 0 | 5 | 0 | 0 |
| 4 | 6 | (Belgium) | DM | Funso Ojo | 4 | 0 | 0 | 1 | 0 | 0 | 0 | 0 | 0 | 0 | 0 | 0 | 5 | 0 | 0 |
| 4 | 11 | (England) | LM | Josh Morris | 5 | 0 | 0 | 0 | 0 | 0 | 0 | 0 | 0 | 0 | 0 | 0 | 5 | 0 | 0 |
| 7 | 16 | (England) | LW | Hakeeb Adelakun | 2 | 0 | 0 | 0 | 0 | 0 | 0 | 0 | 0 | 2 | 0 | 0 | 4 | 0 | 0 |
| 7 | — | (Netherlands) | CF | Kevin van Veen | 2 | 0 | 0 | 1 | 0 | 0 | 0 | 0 | 0 | 1 | 0 | 0 | 4 | 0 | 0 |
| 9 | 1 | (Scotland) | GK | Matt Gilks | 3 | 0 | 0 | 0 | 0 | 0 | 0 | 0 | 0 | 0 | 0 | 0 | 3 | 0 | 0 |
| 9 | 3 | (England) | LB | Conor Townsend | 2 | 0 | 0 | 0 | 0 | 0 | 1 | 0 | 0 | 0 | 0 | 0 | 3 | 0 | 0 |
| 9 | 22 | (England) | CM | Levi Sutton | 3 | 0 | 0 | 0 | 0 | 0 | 0 | 0 | 0 | 0 | 0 | 0 | 3 | 0 | 0 |
| 9 | — | (Republic of Ireland) | CF | Paddy Madden | 2 | 0 | 0 | 0 | 0 | 0 | 0 | 0 | 0 | 1 | 0 | 0 | 3 | 0 | 0 |
| 13 | 4 | (Wales) | CM | Andrew Crofts | 0 | 0 | 0 | 2 | 0 | 0 | 0 | 0 | 0 | 0 | 0 | 0 | 2 | 0 | 0 |
| 13 | 20 | (England) | CB | Charlie Goode | 1 | 0 | 0 | 0 | 0 | 0 | 1 | 0 | 0 | 0 | 0 | 0 | 2 | 0 | 0 |
| 13 | 21 | (Australia) | CB | Cameron Burgess | 0 | 1 | 0 | 0 | 0 | 0 | 0 | 0 | 0 | 0 | 0 | 0 | 0 | 1 | 0 |
| 13 | 23 | (England) | CB | Rory McArdle | 2 | 0 | 0 | 0 | 0 | 0 | 0 | 0 | 0 | 0 | 0 | 0 | 2 | 0 | 0 |
| 18 | 2 | (England) | RB | Jordan Clarke | 1 | 0 | 0 | 0 | 0 | 0 | 0 | 0 | 0 | 0 | 0 | 0 | 1 | 0 | 0 |
| 18 | 7 | (England) | SS | Luke Williams | 1 | 0 | 0 | 0 | 0 | 0 | 0 | 0 | 0 | 0 | 0 | 0 | 1 | 0 | 0 |
| 18 | 8 | (England) | CM | Sam Mantom | 0 | 0 | 0 | 0 | 0 | 0 | 1 | 0 | 0 | 0 | 0 | 0 | 1 | 0 | 0 |
| 18 | 9 | (England) | CF | Ivan Toney | 1 | 0 | 0 | 0 | 0 | 0 | 0 | 0 | 0 | 0 | 0 | 0 | 1 | 0 | 0 |
| 18 | 17 | (England) | CF | Lee Novak | 1 | 0 | 0 | 0 | 0 | 0 | 0 | 0 | 0 | 0 | 0 | 0 | 1 | 0 | 0 |
| 18 | 18 | (Belgium) | RB | Marnick Vermijl | 1 | 0 | 0 | 0 | 0 | 0 | 0 | 0 | 0 | 0 | 0 | 0 | 1 | 0 | 0 |
| 18 | 26 | (England) | CM | Camerom McGeehan | 1 | 0 | 0 | 0 | 0 | 0 | 0 | 0 | 0 | 0 | 0 | 0 | 1 | 0 | 0 |
| 18 | 30 | (Wales) | CF | Simon Church | 0 | 0 | 0 | 1 | 0 | 0 | 0 | 0 | 0 | 0 | 0 | 0 | 1 | 0 | 0 |
| 18 | — | (England) | CM | Devante Redmond | 0 | 0 | 0 | 0 | 0 | 0 | 0 | 0 | 0 | 1 | 0 | 0 | 1 | 0 | 0 |
| Total | | | | | 57 | 1 | 1 | 7 | 0 | 0 | 3 | 0 | 0 | 6 | 0 | 0 | 73 | 1 | 1 |

== Transfers ==
=== Transfers in ===
| Date | Position | Nationality | Name | From | Fee | Ref. |
|---|---|---|---|---|---|---|
| 1 July 2017 | CB | (Australia) | Cameron Burgess | Fulham | Undisclosed | |
| 1 July 2017 | GK | (Scotland) | Matt Gilks | Wigan Athletic | Free | |
| 1 July 2017 | CB | (England) | Rory McArdle | Bradford City | Free | |
| 18 July 2017 | CM | (Belgium) | Funso Ojo | Willem II | Free | |
| 31 August 2017 | CF | (England) | Lee Novak | Charlton Athletic | Free | |
| 1 September 2017 | CM | (Wales) | Andrew Crofts | Charlton Athletic | Free | |
| 3 October 2017 | CM | (New Zealand) | Clayton Lewis | Auckland City | Free | |
| 21 October 2017 | CF | (Wales) | Simon Church | Roda JC | Free | |

=== Transfers out ===
| Date | Position | Nationality | Name | To | Fee | Ref. |
|---|---|---|---|---|---|---|
| 1 July 2017 | GK | (England) | Joe Anyon | Chesterfield | Released | (Note: Joe Anyon joined Chesterfield following his release.) |
| 1 July 2017 | GK | (England) | Luke Daniels | Brentford | Free | |
| 1 July 2017 | CF | (Wales) | Craig Davies | Oldham Athletic | Free | |
| 1 July 2017 | CM | (Republic of Ireland) | Stephen Dawson | Bury | Free | |
| 1 July 2017 | LB | (Scotland) | Scott Laird | Forest Green Rovers | Mutual consent | (Note: Scott Laird joined Forest Green Rovers following his departure.) |
| 1 July 2017 | CB | (England) | David Mirfin | Mansfield Town | Released | (Note: David Mirfin joined Mansfield Town following his release.) |
| 1 July 2017 | DM | (Scotland) | Jamie Ness | Plymouth Argyle | Released | (Note: Jamie Ness joined Plymouth Argyle, following his release.) |
| 1 July 2017 | RB | (Gibraltar) | Scott Wiseman | Chesterfield | Released | (Note: Scott Wiseman joined Chesterfield following his release.) |
| 10 July 2017 | AM | (England) | Dominic Vose | Whitehawk | Mutual consent | (Note: Dominic Vose joined Whitehawk following his release.) |
| 14 December 2017 | CF | (England) | Noel Burdett | Free agent | Mutual consent | |
| 2 January 2018 | CF | (Republic of Ireland) | Paddy Madden | Fleetwood Town | Undisclosed | |
| 19 January 2018 | CF | (Wales) | Simon Church | Plymouth Argyle | Free | |
| 31 January 2018 | CF | (Netherlands) | Kevin van Veen | Northampton Town | Undisclosed | |

=== Loans in ===
| Start date | Position | Nationality | Name | From | End date | Ref. |
|---|---|---|---|---|---|---|
| 28 July 2017 | CM | (England) | Devonte Redmond | Manchester United | 1 January 2018 | |
| 4 January 2018 | CM | (England) | Cameron McGeehan | Barnsley | 30 June 2018 | |
| 11 January 2018 | CF | (England) | Ivan Toney | Newcastle United | 30 June 2018 | |
| 11 January 2018 | LM | (England) | Ryan Yates | Nottingham Forest | 30 June 2018 | |
| 31 January 2018 | RB | (Belgium) | Marnick Vermijl | Preston North End | 30 June 2018 | |

=== Loans out ===
| Start date | Position | Nationality | Name | To | End date | Ref. |
|---|---|---|---|---|---|---|
| 4 August 2017 | LM | (England) | Jack Dyche | Ashton United | January 2018 | |
| 9 August 2017 | DF | (England) | Leslie Sackey | Sheffield | 20 October 2017 | |
| 31 August 2017 | CF | (England) | Kyle Wootton | Stevenage | January 2018 | |
| 1 September 2017 | CF | (England) | Noel Burdett | Harrogate Town | 20 October 2017 | |
| 20 October 2017 | DF | (England) | Leslie Sackey | Basingstoke Town | 19 November 2017 | |
| 26 October 2017 | CF | (England) | Noel Burdett | Matlock Town | 1 January 2018 | |
| 31 January 2018 | CM | (England) | Sam Mantom | Southend United | 30 June 2018 | |
