= Luke Williams (footballer, born 1993) =

English footballer

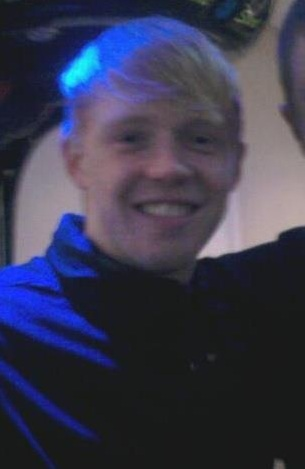

Personal information
- Full name: Luke Anthony Williams
- Date of birth: 11 June 1993 (age 33)
- Place of birth: Middlesbrough, England
- Height: 5 ft 10 in (1.78 m)
- Positions: Attacking midfielder; striker

Youth career
- 2007–2009: Middlesbrough

Senior career*
Years	Team	Apps	(Gls)
2009–2015	Middlesbrough	34	(2)
2014	→ Hartlepool United (loan)	7	(2)
2014	→ Scunthorpe United (loan)	6	(2)
2015	→ Coventry City (loan)	5	(0)
2015	→ Peterborough United (loan)	2	(0)
2015–2018	Scunthorpe United	37	(5)
2017	→ Northampton Town (loan)	8	(0)
2018–2021	Hartlepool United	11	(0)
2021–2022	Gateshead	12	(1)
2022–2024	Vikingur	36	(13)
2024–2025	Scunthorpe United	10	(0)
2025–2026	Vikingur	18	(4)
2026	Spennymoor Town	10	(1)

International career
2009–2010	England U17	5	(0)
2010–2012	England U19	8	(1)
2013	England U20	4	(2)
Medal record
Men's football
Representing England
UEFA European Under-17 Championship
Winner	2010 Liechtenstein
- * Club domestic league appearances and goals as of 08:11, 27 April 2026 (UTC)

Luke Anthony Williams (born 11 June 1993) is an English professional footballer who plays as an attacking midfielder.

Williams began his career at Middlesbrough where he started out as a striker. He has also played in the Football League for Hartlepool United, Scunthorpe United, Coventry City, Peterborough United and Northampton Town.

== Career ==
Williams was born in Middlesbrough, England.

=== Middlesbrough ===
Williams made his league debut on 28 December 2009, coming on as a substitute. In doing so, Williams became the youngest Middlesbrough player in over a century, aged just 16 years and 200 days. Williams made his first Middlesbrough start against Coventry City. On 13 May 2010, it was announced that Williams had secured a professional four-year contract with Middlesbrough. He scored his first goal for Middlesbrough on 21 August 2012, a long range goal in the 88th minute in a 3–2 win against Burnley. He scored his second goal for Middlesbrough on 15 September, in a 2–0 win against Ipswich Town.

=== Hartlepool United (loan) ===
On 23 January 2014, Williams joined Hartlepool United on a one-month loan deal, playing a central-attacking midfield role. The loan was extended but Williams ended up being recalled by Middlesbrough due to his excellent form for the League Two club.

=== Scunthorpe United ===
On 23 October 2014 Williams signed for Scunthorpe United on a one-month loan deal. He made his debut against Notts County.

On 2 July 2015, Williams completed a permanent move to Scunthorpe for an undisclosed fee.

He went out on loan to fellow League One side Northampton Town where he made eight appearances for the club.

Injuries meant that he only played twice in the 2017–18 season – both in the latter part of the season. Williams was released by the club in June 2018.

=== Hartlepool United ===
Williams signed for National League side Hartlepool United in July 2018. Due to injury, Williams failed to make a single appearance in his first season with the club. On 30 October 2020, Williams signed a new deal at Hartlepool.

In March 2021, Williams made his first league start in almost four years in a 1–0 victory against Woking.

Williams was released by Hartlepool at the end of the 2020–21 season. His time at Hartlepool was ravaged due to injuries and, as a result, Williams only made 11 league appearances for the club in his three years with the club – 10 of which were as a substitute. He scored once for Pools, in a FA Trophy defeat against FC Halifax Town in December 2020.

=== Gateshead ===
Williams signed for National League North side Gateshead in August 2021 on a short-term contract. Williams was sent off on his debut against Chester. Following this, Williams was dealt the blow days later of suffering another injury which would see him out for up to seven weeks. He scored his first goal for the club on 8 December 2021 in a 2–0 win against York City. He departed the club on 14 January 2022.

=== Víkingur ===
On 28 July 2022, Williams joined Icelandic side Víkingur on a deal until the end of the season.

In his third season with the club, Williams was made club captain.

=== Return to Scunthorpe ===
On 14 November 2024, Williams signed for former club Scunthorpe United on non-contract terms. He signed with the National League North club after having trained with the team for six weeks.

=== Return to Víkingur ===
In May 2025, Williams agreed to cancel his Scunthorpe contract to rejoin Víkingur.

=== Spennymoor Town ===
On 16 January 2026, it was announced that Williams had signed for National League North side Spennymoor Town on a deal until the end of the season. The following day, he scored on his debut for Spennymoor in a 3–2 defeat against Radcliffe. He left Spennymoor at the end of the 2025–26 season following the expiration of his short-term contract.

== International career ==
He made his England under-17 debut on 26 October 2009, in a 6–2 win against Kazakhstan. He made his under-19 debut on 2 September 2010, in a 2–0 win against Slovakia. He scored his first goal on 2 June 2011, in a 3–2 win against Switzerland during 2011 UEFA European Under-19 Championship qualification. On 28 May 2013, he was named in manager Peter Taylor's 21-man squad for the 2013 FIFA U-20 World Cup. He scored on his debut on 16 June, in a 3–0 win in a warm-up game against Uruguay. He also scored in the opening group-stage game on 23 June against Iraq.

== Personal life ==
He is the cousin of his former Spennymoor Town team-mate Junior Mondal.

== Career statistics ==
As of match played 6 April 2026

Appearance and goals by club, season and competition
Club	Season	League			FA Cup		League Cup		Other		Total	
Club	Season	Division	Apps	Goals	Apps	Goals	Apps	Goals	Apps	Goals	Apps	Goals
Middlesbrough	2009–10	Championship	4	0	1	0	0	0	0	0	5	0
Middlesbrough	2010–11	Championship	6	0	0	0	1	0	0	0	7	0
Middlesbrough	2011–12	Championship	0	0	0	0	0	0	0	0	0	0
Middlesbrough	2012–13	Championship	11	2	1	0	2	0	0	0	14	2
Middlesbrough	2013–14	Championship	9	0	1	0	1	0	0	0	11	0
Middlesbrough	2014–15	Championship	4	0	0	0	1	1	0	0	5	1
Middlesbrough	Total		34	2	3	0	5	1	0	0	42	3
Hartlepool United (loan)	2013–14	League Two	7	2	0	0	0	0	0	0	7	2
Scunthorpe United (loan)	2014–15	League One	6	2	0	0	—		0	0	6	2
Coventry City (loan)	2014–15	League One	5	0	0	0	—		0	0	5	0
Peterborough United (loan)	2014–15	League One	2	0	0	0	—		0	0	2	0
Scunthorpe United	2015–16	League One	28	5	4	0	0	0	0	0	32	5
Scunthorpe United	2016–17	League One	7	0	1	0	1	0	3 (Note: Appearances in EFL Trophy)	2	12	2
Scunthorpe United	2017–18	League One	2	0	0	0	0	0	0	0	2	0
Scunthorpe United	Total		37	5	5	0	1	0	3	2	46	7
Northampton Town (loan)	2016–17	League One	8	0	—		—		0	0	8	0
Hartlepool United	2019–20	National League	3	0	1	0	0	0	0	0	4	0
Hartlepool United	2020–21	National League	8	0	0	0	0	0	1	1	9	1
Hartlepool United	Total		11	0	0	0	0	0	1	1	13	1
Gateshead	2021–22	National League North	12	1	2	0	—		1	0	15	1
Víkingur	2022	2. deild karla	4	1	0	0	0	0	0	0	4	1
Víkingur	2023	2. deild karla	19	4	0	0	0	0	0	0	19	4
Víkingur	2024	2. deild karla	13	8	2	1	0	0	0	0	15	9
Víkingur	Total		36	13	2	1	0	0	0	0	38	14
Scunthorpe United	2024–25	National League North	10	0	0	0	—		1	0	11	0
Víkingur	2025	2. deild karla	18	4	1	0	0	0	0	0	19	4
Spennymoor Town	2025–26	National League North	10	1	0	0	—		0	0	10	1
Career total			196	30	14	1	6	1	6	3	222	35

== Honours ==
England U17

- UEFA European Under-17 Championship: 2010
