= Conor Townsend =

English footballer (born 1993)

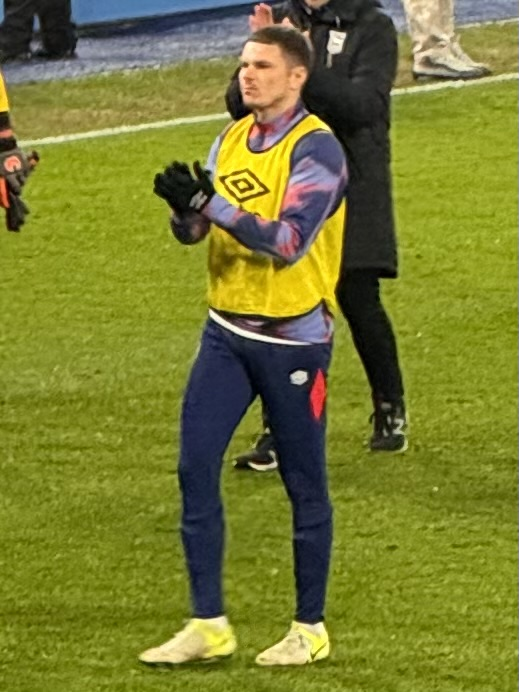
- Townsend with Ipswich Town in 2024

Personal information
- Full name: Conor Stephen Townsend
- Date of birth: 4 March 1993 (age 33)
- Place of birth: Hessle, England
- Height: 6 ft 0 in (1.83 m)
- Position: Left-back

Team information
- Current team: West Bromwich Albion
- Number: 22

Youth career
- 2001–2011: Hull City

Senior career*
Years	Team	Apps	(Gls)
2011–2016	Hull City	0	(0)
2011–2012	→ Grimsby Town (loan)	27	(1)
2012–2013	→ Chesterfield (loan)	20	(1)
2013	→ Carlisle United (loan)	11	(0)
2014	→ Carlisle United (loan)	1	(0)
2014–2015	→ Dundee United (loan)	17	(0)
2015	→ Scunthorpe United (loan)	6	(0)
2015	→ Grimsby Town (loan)	9	(1)
2016–2018	Scunthorpe United	74	(5)
2018–2024	West Bromwich Albion	195	(3)
2024–2026	Ipswich Town	6	(0)
2026–	West Bromwich Albion	3	(0)
- * Club domestic league appearances and goals as of 13:27, 30 September 2026 (UTC)

Conor Stephen Townsend (born 4 March 1993) is an English professional footballer who plays as a left-back for EFL Championship club West Bromwich Albion.

Townsend began his career with Hull City, from whom he had loan spells with Grimsby Town, Chesterfield, Carlisle United, Dundee United and Scunthorpe United before joining the latter permanently. He then went on to play more than 200 times for West Bromwich Albion before joining Ipswich Town. He returned to West Bromwich Albion for a second spell in 2026.

== Career ==
=== Hull City ===
Townsend came through the youth ranks at Hull City after joining the club at the age of eight, and was promoted to the club's first team during the 2011–12 season.

Townsend's breakthrough of sorts, at the start of the 2013–14 season, occurred when he made his Hull City debut on 27 August 2013, coming on as 55th-minute substitute in a League Cup game against Leyton Orient.

He signed a one-year contract extension with Hull in June 2015.

==== Four years on loan ====
Townsend joined Grimsby Town on loan on 25 October 2011, initially for one month. He made his debut on 29 October, playing in a 5–0 win against Ashington in the fourth qualifying round of the FA Cup, and was named man-of-the-match. He made his league debut on 5 November, playing the full 90 minutes of a 2–2 draw against Bath City. After making 5 appearances, his loan was extended by a further month. On 29 December, the loan was extended until the end of the season. He scored his first professional goal, from a free kick, in a 2–1 win against Forest Green Rovers. He made 27 league appearances, as well as five in the FA Cup. At the end of the 2011–12 season Townsend was awarded the club's "Supporters Young Player of the Season" award.

On 20 November 2012, he joined Chesterfield on a month-long loan. He made his debut on 15 December, replacing Jay O'Shea after 85 minutes of a 1–1 draw at home to Burton Albion. On 29 December, he scored his first goal for Chesterfield and was then sent off later in the game, during a 1–1 draw against Morecambe. The loan was eventually extended to the end of the season. In total, he played 20 games for Chesterfield and scored once. On 29 April, his loan deal ended and he returned to Hull City.

After making his first appearance for Hull, Townsend moved on a month-long loan to Carlisle United on 2 September 2013. The loan was extended for two months on 26 September 2013. Here, he played twelve league games, three FA Cup games and two Football League Trophy games. He was sent off in a 0–0 draw against Rotherham United.

Townsend moved to Dundee United on loan in July 2014. He made his debut on 10 August 2014, as Dundee United beat Aberdeen 3–0 in the opening game of the 2014–15 season. Following transfer deadline day moves he returned to Hull City early on 3 February 2015.

On 28 February 2015, Townsend joined Scunthorpe United on a month-long loan, which was later extended to the end of the season. He debuted the same day, in a 0–0 draw against Yeovil Town. He played six times for Scunthorpe, before going back to Hull.

Having signed a one-year contract extension with Hull in 2015, Townsend was again loaned to Grimsby Town, joining for one month on 12 October 2015. This was later extended until 1 January 2016. He scored twice, once in a 5–1 win against St Albans, in the FA Cup and again in a 3–1 win against Welling United, in the league.

=== Scunthorpe United ===
On 6 January 2016, Townsend signed for Scunthorpe United on a free transfer. Townsend scored his first goal for the club in a 6–0 win over Swindon Town on 28 March 2016. He played 88 games for Scunthorpe, scored five goals and was a crucial part of their push for play-offs in 2015–16, 2016–17 (where they lost to Millwall in the semi-finals) and 2017–18 (where they lost to Rotherham in the semi-finals).

=== West Bromwich Albion (first spell) ===
On 28 July 2018, Scunthorpe sold Townsend to West Bromwich Albion for £1,500,000 with 50% going to Hull City, after Scunthorpe rejected a bid from Ipswich Town and Hull City decided not to activate their first option to buy. He signed a three-year deal. In his first season with West Brom, Townsend was the second choice left back, behind Kieran Gibbs and only managed 12 league appearances in his debut season. Townsend made his debut for West Brom in a 4–3 victory over Norwich City, where he came off the bench at half time for Gibbs. In his second season, Townsend was used more often, making 27 league appearances – including 19 starts. On 25 January 2020, Townsend scored his first goal for West Brom in a 1–0 victory over Premier League side, West Ham, in the FA Cup. In a successful season for West Brom, they finished second and were promoted to the Premier League.

In the 2020–21 season, Townsend was the preferred choice, when available, but missed the whole of December and January after suffering an knee injury in a 1–0 win over Sheffield United. Townsend would play in 25 league games as The Baggies were relegated, after finishing 19th. With Kieran Gibbs leaving West Brom before the start of the 2021–22 season, Townsend became first choice and started 43 league games across the season. With a season of good performances, fans began making playful comparisons to Roberto Carlos – which led to the joke nickname 'Conor Carlos'. For his good performances, Townsend was rewarded with a new contract, extending until 2025.

In the 2022–23 season, Townsend played in all 46 league matches. In a 3–2 victory against Luton Town, Townsend scored his first league goal for West Brom, which completed the comeback after being 2–0 down at halftime. Townsend would go on to score two more goals in the season – one against Watford and one against Norwich. With captain Jake Livermore out of the starting 11 and vice-captain Dara O'Shea injured, Townsend was nominated as stand-in captain for the final few games of the season. For the 2023–24 season, Townsend was named third captain, standing in for Jed Wallace and Okay Yokuslu.

=== Ipswich Town ===
On 1 August 2024, Townsend signed for Ipswich Town on a two-year contract for a £750,000 fee. He went on to make ten competitive appearances for the club in his debut season, including three Premier League starts in a season which saw the club relegated to the Championship.

In an August 2025 pre-season game against Auxerre, Townsend suffered an injury to his anterior cruciate ligament, causing him to miss the full 2025–26 season campaign which saw Ipswich promoted to the Premier League. He was released by the Tractor Boys at the end of the season.

=== West Bromwich Albion (second spell) ===
On 24 July 2026, Townsend signed for West Bromwich Albion for the second time, on a one-year deal. He took his second competitive Albion bow, his first game for 16 months, in a 4–1 over Rotherham United in the League Cup.

== Career statistics ==
As of 30 September 2026

Appearances and goals by club, season and competition
Club	Season	League			National cup (Note: Includes FA Cup, Scottish Cup)		League cup (Note: Includes EFL Cup, Scottish League Cup)		Other		Total	
Club	Season	Division	Apps	Goals	Apps	Goals	Apps	Goals	Apps	Goals	Apps	Goals
Hull City	2011–12	Championship	0	0	0	0	0	0	—		0	0
Hull City	2012–13	Championship	0	0	0	0	0	0	—		0	0
Hull City	2013–14	Premier League	0	0	0	0	1	0	—		1	0
Hull City	2014–15	Premier League	0	0	0	0	0	0	0	0	0	0
Hull City	Total		0	0	0	0	1	0	0	0	1	0
Grimsby Town (loan)	2011–12	Conference Premier	27	1	4	0	—		0	0	31	1
Chesterfield (loan)	2012–13	League Two	20	1	0	0	0	0	0	0	20	1
Carlisle United (loan)	2013–14	League One	12	0	3	0	—		2 (Note: Appearances in the Football League Trophy)	0	17	0
Dundee United (loan)	2014–15	Scottish Premiership	17	0	1	0	1	0	—		19	0
Scunthorpe United (loan)	2014–15	League One	6	0	0	0	0	0	—		6	0
Grimsby Town (loan)	2015–16	National League	9	1	3	1	—		0	0	12	2
Scunthorpe United	2015–16	League One	20	1	—		0	0	0	0	20	1
Scunthorpe United	2016–17	League One	24	0	1	0	2	0	5 (Note: Three appearances in the Football League Trophy and two in the League One play-offs)	0	32	0
Scunthorpe United	2017–18	League One	30	4	1	0	2	0	3 (Note: One appearance in the Football League Trophy and two in the League One play-offs)	0	36	5
Scunthorpe United	Total		74	5	2	0	4	0	8	0	88	5
West Bromwich Albion	2018–19	Championship	12	0	3	0	3	0	—		18	0
West Bromwich Albion	2019–20	Championship	27	0	2	1	1	0	—		30	1
West Bromwich Albion	2020–21	Premier League	25	0	0	0	2	0	—		27	0
West Bromwich Albion	2021–22	Championship	43	0	1	0	0	0	—		44	0
West Bromwich Albion	2022–23	Championship	46	3	1	0	1	0	—		48	3
West Bromwich Albion	2023–24	Championship	42	0	1	0	1	0	2 (Note: Two appearances made in the Championship play-offs)	0	46	0
West Bromwich Albion	Total		195	3	8	1	8	0	2	0	213	4
Ipswich Town	2024–25	Premier League	6	0	3	0	1	0	—		10	0
Ipswich Town	2025–26	Championship	0	0	0	0	0	0	—		0	0
Ipswich Town	Total		6	0	3	0	1	0	0	0	10	0
West Bromwich Albion	2026–27	Championship	3	0	0	0	2	0	—		5	0
Career total			369	11	24	2	18	0	12	0	423	14
