= 2015–16 Scunthorpe United F.C. season =

Scunthorpe United
2015–16 season
- Chairman: Peter Swann
- Manager: Mark Robins (until 18 January); Nick Daws (caretaker) (between 18 January–22 March); Graham Alexander (from 22 March)
- Stadium: Glanford Park
- League One: 7th
- FA Cup: Third round (eliminated by Chelsea)
- League Cup: First round (eliminated by Barnsley)
- JP Trophy: First round (eliminated by Barnsley)
- Top goalscorer: League: Paddy Madden (15); All: Paddy Madden (18)
- Highest home attendance: 4,147 vs Barnsley (31 Oct 15)
- Lowest home attendance: 3,003 vs Barnsley (12 Aug 15)
Home colours	Away colours

The 2015–16 season was Scunthorpe United's 117th season in their existence and their second consecutive season in League One. Along with competing in League One, the club also participated in the FA Cup, League Cup and Football League Trophy. The season covered the period from 1 July 2015 to 30 June 2016.

== Competitions ==
=== Pre-season friendlies ===
On 19 May 2015, Scunthorpe United announced two pre-season friendlies against Bolton Wanderers and Gainsborough Trinity. A third pre-season friendly was confirmed on 11 June 2015, against Hartlepool United. On 18 June 2015, the Iron announced Sheffield Wednesday will visit one-week prior to the league opener. On 24 June 2015, a friendly fixture away to Notts County was confirmed. On 18 July 2015, it was announced Iron will face Middlesbrough in Marbella.

11 July 2015 Friendly	Gainsborough Trinity	0–3	Scunthorpe United	Gainsborough
13:00 BST		Report	Boyce 61'; Williams 80'; Madden 88' (pen.)	Stadium: The Northolme

21 July 2015 Friendly	Hartlepool United	0–4	Scunthorpe United	Hartlepool
19:00 BST		Report	Madden (?); Williams (?)	Stadium: Victoria Park

24 July 2015 Friendly	Scunthorpe United	1–1	Bolton Wanderers	Scunthorpe
19:45 BST	Madden (pen.)	Report	Vela 2'	Stadium: Glanford Park; Attendance: 1,732 (170 away)

29 July 2015 Friendly	Scunthorpe United	4–2	Sheffield Wednesday	Scunthorpe
19:45 BST	van Veen 13', 66'; Madden 26'; Wootton 90'	Report	Nuhiu 12'; Matias 21'	Stadium: Glanford Park

31 July 2015 Friendly	Notts County	1–2	Scunthorpe United	Nottingham
19:45 BST	Jenner 45'	Report	Henderson; Dyche 81'	Stadium: Meadow Lane

=== League One ===
==== League table ====
Pos	Team	Pld	W	D	L	GF	GA	GD	Pts	Promotion, qualification or relegation
5	Bradford City	46	23	11	12	55	40	+15	80	Qualification for the League One play-offs (Note: Four teams play for one spot and promotion to Football League Championship.)
6	Barnsley (O, P)	46	22	8	16	70	54	+16	74	Qualification for the League One play-offs
7	Scunthorpe United	46	21	11	14	60	47	+13	74	
8	Coventry City	46	19	12	15	67	49	+18	69	
9	Gillingham	46	19	12	15	71	56	+15	69	

Updated to match(es) played on 1 July 2016. Source: BBC Sport
Rules for classification: 1) Points; 2) Goal difference; 3) Number of goals scored
(O) Play-off winners; (P) Promoted

==== Matches ====
8 August 2015 1	Burton Albion	2–1	Scunthorpe United	Burton upon Trent
15:00 BST	Beavon 55'; Akins 72' (pen.); Naylor (yellow card) 89'	Report	Daniels (red card) 71'; Clarke (yellow card) 77'; Goode 90+3'	Stadium: Pirelli Stadium; Attendance: 4,064; Referee: Kevin Wright

15 August 2015 2	Scunthorpe United	2–0	Crewe Alexandra	Scunthorpe
15:00 BST	Madden 10', 65'	Report		Stadium: Glanford Park; Attendance: 3,188; Referee: Trevor Kettle

19 August 2015 3	Wigan Athletic	3–0	Scunthorpe United	Wigan
19:45 BST	Grigg 3' (pen.); Daniels 27'; Davies 70'	Report		Stadium: DW Stadium; Attendance: 7,794; Referee: Andy Madley

22 August 2015 4	Scunthorpe United	0–0	Millwall	Scunthorpe
15:00 BST		Report		Stadium: Glanford Park; Attendance: 3,382; Referee: Richard Clark

29 August 2015 5	Colchester United	2–2	Scunthorpe United	Colchester
15:00 BST	Moncur 33'; Elokobi 81'	Report	van Veen 7'; Madden 18'	Stadium: Colchester Community Stadium; Attendance: 3,019; Referee: Dean Whitestone

5 September 2015 6	Scunthorpe United	0–1	Blackpool	Scunthorpe
15:00 BST		Report	Potts 35'	Stadium: Glanford Park; Attendance: 3,313; Referee: Tony Harrington

12 September 2015 7	Scunthorpe United	1–0	Coventry City	Scunthorpe
15:00 BST	Madden 79'	Report		Stadium: Glanford Park; Attendance: 3,746; Referee: Andy Haines

19 September 2015 8	Rochdale	2–1	Scunthorpe United	Rochdale
15:00 BST	Bunney 67'; Vincenti 85'	Report	Wallace 76'	Stadium: Spotland Stadium; Attendance: 2,958; Referee: Peter Bankes

26 September 2015 9	Southend United	2–1	Scunthorpe United	Southend-on-Sea
15:00 BST	Timlin 36'; Coker 75'	Report	McSheffrey 8'	Stadium: Roots Hall; Attendance: 5,708; Referee: Kevin Johnson

29 September 2015 10	Scunthorpe United	0–1	Walsall	Scunthorpe
19:45 BST		Report	27' Henry	Stadium: Glanford Park; Attendance: 2,596; Referee: Paul Tierney

3 October 2015 11	Scunthorpe United	1–0	Fleetwood Town	Scunthorpe
15:00 BST	Madden 68'	Report		Stadium: Glanford Park; Attendance: 3,095; Referee: Robert Lewis

10 October 2015 12	Oldham Athletic	2–4	Scunthorpe United	Oldham
15:00 BST	Kelly 25'; Poleon 27'	Report	10' McSheffrey; 35' Rowe; 69' Madden; 84' van Veen	Stadium: Boundary Park; Attendance: 4,002; Referee: Geoff Eltringham

17 October 2015 13	Scunthorpe United	2–1	Shrewsbury Town	Scunthorpe
15:00 BST	Laird 58'; Madden 74' (pen.)	Report	15' Kaikai	Stadium: Glanford Park; Attendance: 3,558; Referee: Eddie Ilderton

20 October 2015 14	Gillingham	2–1	Scunthorpe United	Gillingham
19:45 BST	Dickenson 59'; Wright (red card) 81'; Lennon 90+2'	Report	53' Laird	Stadium: Priestfield Stadium; Attendance: 4,823; Referee: Lee Swabey

24 October 2015 15	Chesterfield	0–3	Scunthorpe United	Chesterfield
15:00 BST	Jones (red card) 55'	Report	56' (pen.), 78' Madden; 63' McSheffrey	Stadium: Proact Stadium; Attendance: 6,340; Referee: Darren England

31 October 2015 16	Scunthorpe United	2–0	Barnsley	Scunthorpe
15:00 GMT	Hopper 6'; McSheffrey 41'	Report		Stadium: Glanford Park; Attendance: 4,147; Referee: Stuart Atwell

14 November 2015 17	Swindon Town	2–1	Scunthorpe United	Swindon
15:00 GMT	Branco 55'; Ajose 59'	Report	73' Clarke	Stadium: County Ground; Attendance: 6,957; Referee: Iain Williamson

21 November 2015 18	Scunthorpe United	0–2	Bradford City	Scunthorpe
15:00 GMT		Report	28' (pen.) McMahon; 52' Leigh	Stadium: Glanford Park; Attendance: 4,865; Referee: Seb Stockbridge

24 November 2015 19	Bury	1–2	Scunthorpe United	Bury
19:45 GMT	Clarke 50'	Report	12' (pen.) Madden; 86' Williams	Stadium: Gigg Lane; Attendance: 2,483; Referee: Tony Harrington

28 November 2015 20	Scunthorpe United	0–4	Peterborough United	Scunthorpe
15:00 GMT		Report	4', 82', 90' Washington; 49' Bostwick	Stadium: Glanford Park; Attendance: 3,790; Referee: Jeremy Simpson

12 December 2015 21	Port Vale	1–1	Scunthorpe United	Burslem
15:00 GMT	Leitch–Smith 45+2'	Report	King 36'	Stadium: Vale Park; Attendance: 3,983; Referee: Lee Collins

19 December 2015 22	Scunthorpe United	0–1	Sheffield United	Scunthorpe
15:00 GMT		Report	Sharp 50'	Stadium: Glanford Park; Attendance: 5,150; Referee: Andy Haines

26 December 2015 23	Doncaster Rovers	0–1	Scunthorpe United	Doncaster
15:00 GMT		Report	Madden 20'	Stadium: Keepmoat Stadium; Attendance: 8,744; Referee: Stuart Attwell

28 December 2015 24	Scunthorpe United	1–1	Rochdale	Scunthorpe
15:00 GMT	Mirfin 33'	Report	22' Henderson	Stadium: Glanford Park; Attendance: 3,860; Referee: Darren Bond

2 January 2016 25	Scunthorpe United	1–1	Wigan Athletic	Scunthorpe
15:00 GMT	Williams 20'	Report	34' Jacobs	Stadium: Glanford Park; Attendance: 4,102; Referee: Chris Sarginson

16 January 2016 26	Blackpool	5–0	Scunthorpe United	Blackpool
15:00 GMT	Aldred 2'; Potts 12', 28'; Norris 55'; Philliskirk 82'	Report	(yellow card) 19' Williams; (yellow card) 58' van Veen	Stadium: Bloomfield Road; Attendance: 6,004; Referee: Darren Deadman

23 January 2016 27	Scunthorpe United	3–0	Colchester United	Scunthorpe
15:00 GMT	Hopper 60'; Madden 62', 68'	Report		Stadium: Glanford Park; Attendance: 3,332; Referee: Darren Handley

30 January 2016 28	Coventry City	1–2	Scunthorpe United	Coventry
15:00 GMT	Vincelot (yellow card) 76' (red card) 88'; Armstrong 86' (pen.)	Report	9' Hopper; 62' Wallace; (yellow card) 90+4' McSheffrey	Stadium: Ricoh Arena; Attendance: 11,138; Referee: James Linington

13 February 2016 29	Scunthorpe United	1–0	Southend United	Scunthorpe
15:00 GMT	Madden 11'	Report		Stadium: Glanford Park; Attendance: 3,550; Referee: David Coote

16 February 2016 30	Millwall	0–2	Scunthorpe United	London
19:45 GMT		Report	17' McSheffrey 17'; O'Brien 90+1'	Stadium: The Den; Attendance: 8,036; Referee: Nick Kinseley

20 February 2016 31	Fleetwood Town	2–1	Scunthorpe United	Fleetwood
15:00 GMT	Hunter 16'; Grant 29'	Report	70' (pen.) Madden	Stadium: Highbury Stadium; Attendance: 3,098; Referee: Ross Joyce

27 February 2016 32	Scunthorpe United	1–1	Oldham Athletic	Scunthorpe
15:00 GMT	Wootton 88'	Report	78' Lafferty	Stadium: Glanford Park; Attendance: 4,180; Referee: Darren England

1 March 2016 33	Walsall	0–0	Scunthorpe United	Walsall
19:45 GMT		Report		Stadium: Banks's Stadium; Attendance: 3,868; Referee: Geoff Eltringham

5 March 2016 34	Scunthorpe United	0–0	Gillingham	Scunthorpe
15:00 GMT	O'Brien (yellow card) 59'; Ness (yellow card) 90+2'	Report	Morris (yellow card) 40'; Hessenthaler (yellow card) 87'	Stadium: Glanford Park; Attendance: 3,355; Referee: Darren Deadman

8 March 2016 35	Scunthorpe United	2–0	Doncaster Rovers	Scunthorpe
19:45 GMT	Hopper 7'; Mirfin 58'; Clarke (yellow card) 82'	Report		Stadium: Glanford Park; Attendance: 4,887; Referee: Kevin Wright

12 March 2016 36	Shrewsbury Town	2–2	Scunthorpe United	Shrewsbury
15:00 GMT	Kaikai 21'; Cole (yellow card) 49'; Ogogo (yellow card) 58'; Vassell (yellow card) 90+4'; Akpa–Akpro 90+5'	Report	Clarke (yellow card) 47'; Madden (yellow card) 54' (goal) 78'; Wootton 69'	Stadium: Greenhous Meadow; Attendance: 5,028; Referee: Lee Collins

19 March 2016 37	Scunthorpe United	1–1	Chesterfield	Scunthorpe
15:00 GMT	Madden 18'; O'Brien (yellow card) 83'	Report	O'Neil (yellow card) 55'; Campbell–Ryce 60'	Stadium: Glanford Park; Attendance: 3,871; Referee: Keith Hill

25 March 2016 38	Barnsley	0–0	Scunthorpe United	Barnsley
15:00 GMT	Scowen (yellow card) 37'; Roberts (yellow card) 60'	Report	King (yellow card) 90+3'	Stadium: Oakwell; Attendance: 10,122; Referee: Darren Drysdale

28 March 2016 39	Scunthorpe United	6–0	Swindon Town	Scunthorpe
15:00 GMT	Townsend 27'; Clarke 44'; Adelakun 48'; Hopper 52' 76'; Madden 62'	Report	Thompson (yellow card) 71'	Stadium: Glanford Park; Attendance: 3,534; Referee: (England) Eddie Ilderton

2 April 2016 40	Bradford City	1–0	Scunthorpe United	Bradford
15:00 GMT	Davies 68' (yellow card) 80'; Cullen (yellow card) 87'	Report	Clarke (yellow card) 65'; Adelakun (yellow card) 90+1'	Stadium: Coral Windows Stadium; Attendance: 17,873; Referee: Gavin Ward

9 April 2016 41	Scunthorpe United	1–0	Burton Albion	Scunthorpe
15:00 GMT	Bishop 60'; Madden (yellow card) 90+1'	Report	Harness (yellow card) 90'	Stadium: Glanford Park; Attendance: 3,888; Referee: Andy Haines

16 April 2016 42	Crewe Alexandra	2–3	Scunthorpe United	Crewe
15:00 GMT	Turton 15'; Ainley (yellow card) 71'; Haber 79'	Report	Williams 43' 75'; Adelakun 64'	Stadium: Alexandra Stadium; Attendance: 3,852; Referee: Darren England

19 April 2016 43	Scunthorpe United	2–1	Bury	Scunthorpe
19:45 GMT	Williams 19'; Madden (yellow card) 31'; Wootton 53'; Bishop (yellow card) 89'	Report	Jones (yellow card) 22'; Clarke (yellow card) 45'; Pope 61'; Etuhu (yellow card) 89' (yellow-red card); Bolger (yellow card) 90+4'	Stadium: Glanford Park; Attendance: 3,188; Referee: Seb Stockbridge

23 April 2016 44	Peterborough United	0–2	Scunthorpe United	Peterborough
15:00 GMT	Angol (yellow card) 38'	Report	Dawson (yellow card) 43'; Ricardo 51' (o.g.); Wallace (yellow card) 57'; Townsend (yellow card) 75'; Hopper 76'	Stadium: ABAX Stadium; Attendance: 5,065; Referee: Paul Gibbs

30 April 2016 45	Scunthorpe United	1–0	Port Vale	Scunthorpe
15:00 GMT	Madden 61'; Clarke (yellow card) 65'	Report	Duffy (yellow card) 54'	Stadium: Glanford Park; Attendance: 7,275; Referee: Ben Toner

8 May 2016 46	Sheffield United	0–2	Scunthorpe United	Sheffield
12:30 GMT	Coutts (yellow card) 44'	Report	Hopper 39'; Madden 64'	Stadium: Bramall Lane; Attendance: 21,445; Referee: Michael Bull

=== FA Cup ===
7 November 2015 First round	Scunthorpe United	2–1	Southend United	Scunthorpe
15:00 GMT	Madden 16', 78'	Report	Leonard 30'	Stadium: Glanford Park; Attendance: 3,335; Referee: Peter Bankes

5 December 2015 Second Round	Leyton Orient	0–0	Scunthorpe United	Leyton
15:00 BST		Report		Stadium: Matchroom Stadium; Attendance: 2,540; Referee: James Linington

15 December 2015 Second round replay	Scunthorpe United	3–0	Leyton Orient	Scunthorpe
19:45 GMT	Mvoto 55' (o.g.); King 60'; Adelakun 90+4'	Report		Stadium: Glanford Park; Attendance: 3,082; Referee: David Webb

10 January 2016 Third Round	Chelsea	2–0	Scunthorpe United	Chelsea
14:00 GMT	Diego Costa 13'; Loftus-Cheek 68'	Report		Stadium: Stamford Bridge; Attendance: 41,625; Referee: Craig Pawson

=== League Cup ===
11 August 2015 First round	Scunthorpe United	1–1 (6–7 p)	Barnsley	Scunthorpe
19:45 BST	Madden 52' (pen.)	Report	Scowen 47' (pen.)	Stadium: Glanford Park; Attendance: 3,003; Referee: Graham Salisbury
	Penalties
	Madden (penalty scored); Hopper (penalty scored); Adelakun (penalty scored); Laird (penalty scored); Bishop (penalty scored) van Veen (penalty missed); Mirfin (penalty scored); McAllister (penalty missed)		Winnall (penalty scored); Hourihane (penalty scored); Scowen (penalty scored); Mawson (penalty scored); Roberts (penalty scored); Pearson (penalty missed); Nyatanga (penalty scored); Bree (penalty scored)

=== Football League Trophy ===
On 8 August 2015, live on Soccer AM the draw for the first round of the Football League Trophy was drawn by Toni Duggan and Alex Scott.

1 September 2015 First round	Scunthorpe United	1–2	Barnsley	Scunthorpe
19:45 BST	Goode 90'	Report	Nyatanga 62'; Watkins 76'	Stadium: Glanford Park; Attendance: 1,796; Referee: Ben Toner

=== Lincolnshire Senior Cup ===
On 3 June 2015, Scunthorpe United announced the details for the 2015 Lincolnshire Senior Cup. On 25 July 2015, the details of the semi-final were confirmed.

25 July 2015 Quarter-Final	Lincoln United	2–5	Scunthorpe United	Lincoln
13:00 BST	McGovern 60'; Ruthven 68'	Report	McAllister 13'; Wootton 38', 89'; Burdett 62' van Veen 76'	Stadium: Ashby Avenue

1 August 2015 Semi-final	Scunthorpe United	2–2 (6–5 p)	Lincoln City	Scunthorpe
15:00 BST	Hopper (?)	Report	Power 35' (pen.); Rhead 68'	Stadium: Glanford Park; Attendance: 1,015 (158 away)

== Squad ==
No.	Name	Pos.	Nat.	Place of Birth	Age	Apps	Goals	Signed from	Date Signed	Free	Contract
Goalkeepers
1	Luke Daniels	GK	(England)	Bolton	38	54	0	West Bromwich Albion	22 January 2015	Undisclosed	2017
13	Joe Anyon	GK	(England)	Lytham St Annes	39	7	0	Crewe Alexandra	26 January 2015	Free	2017
Defenders
2	Scott Wiseman	RB	(Gibraltar)	Hull	40	27	0	Preston North End	28 May 2015	Free	2017
3	Scott Laird	LB	(England)	Taunton	38	31	2	Preston North End	11 June 2015	Free	2018
5	David Mirfin	CB	(England)	Sheffield	41	237	9	Watford	31 July 2012	Free	2017
6	Niall Canavan	CB	(Republic of Ireland)	Leeds	35	164	6	Academy	1 July 2009	Trainee	2016
17	Conor Townsend	LB	(England)	Hessle	33	12	0	Hull City	6 January 2016	Free	2018
20	Charlie Goode	CB	(England)	Watford	31	12	1	Hendon	10 June 2015	Free	2017
23	Murray Wallace	CB	(Scotland)	Glasgow	33	19	2	Huddersfield Town	2 January 2016	Undisclosed	2019
25	Andrew Boyce	CB	(England)	Doncaster	36	37	1	Lincoln City	6 January 2014	Undisclosed	2016
33	Jordan Clarke	RB	(England)	Coventry	34	44	1	Coventry City	10 January 2015	Undisclosed	2017
Midfielders
4	Sean McAllister	CM	(England)	Bolton	39	88	1	Cowdenbeath	19 July 2013	Free	2015
8	Dominic Vose	AM	(England)	London	32	0	0	Wrexham	1 February 2016	Undisclosed	2018
11	Jim O'Brien	WG	(Scotland)	Alexandria	38	3	1	Coventry City	15 February 2016	Loan	2016
12	Neal Bishop	CM	(England)	Stockton-on-Tees	45	79	5	Blackpool	19 June 2014	Free	2017
14	Terry Hawkridge	RW	(England)	Nottingham	36	66	2	Gainsborough Trinity	4 June 2013	Undisclosed	2016
15	Stephen Dawson	LM	(Republic of Ireland)	Dublin	40	14	0	Rochdale	1 July 2015	Free	2017
16	Hakeeb Adelakun	LW	(England)	Hackney	30	87	9	Academy	1 July 2012	Trainee	2018
18	Jack King	AM	(England)	Oxford	41	32	2	Preston North End	26 May 2015	Free	2017
21	Isaac Assenso	CM	(England)		18	0	0	Leeds United	4 June 2015	Free	2016
26	Jamie Ness	CM	(Scotland)	Irvine	35	19	0	Stoke City	10 July 2015	Free	2017
28	Gary McSheffrey	LW	(England)	Coventry	44	86	16	Chesterfield	14 January 2014	Free	2016
31	Levi Sutton	MF	(England)		18	0	0	Academy	2 June 2015	Trainee	2016
Forwards
7	Luke Williams	CF/AM	(England)	Middlesbrough	33	27	4	Middlesbrough	2 July 2015	Free	2018
9	Paddy Madden	CF	(Republic of Ireland)	Dublin	36	111	40	Yeovil Town	10 January 2014	£300,000	2018
10	Kevin van Veen	CF	(Netherlands)	Eindhoven	35	45	4	FC Oss	30 January 2015	Undisclosed	2018
14	Greg Luer	CF	(England)	Brighton	31	3	0	Hull City	9 February 2016	Loan	2016
22	Tom Hopper	CF	(England)	Boston	32	34	7	Leicester City	1 July 2015	Free	2017
29	Kyle Wootton	CF	(England)	Epworth	29	24	2	Academy	1 July 2014	Free	2016

=== Statistics ===
As of 27 February 2014

No.	Pos	Nat	Player	Total		League One		FA Cup		League Cup		League Trophy	
No.	Pos	Nat	Player	Apps	Goals	Apps	Goals	Apps	Goals	Apps	Goals	Apps	Goals
1	GK	(England) ENG	Luke Daniels	31	0	27+0	0	4+0	0	0+0	0	0+0	0
2	DF	(Gibraltar) GIB	Scott Wiseman	27	0	21+2	0	3+0	0	1+0	0	0+0	0
3	DF	(England) ENG	Scott Laird	31	2	25+1	2	4+0	0	1+0	0	0+0	0
4	MF	(England) ENG	Sean McAllister	12	0	6+3	0	1+1	0	1+0	0	0+0	0
5	DF	(England) ENG	David Mirfin	24	1	21+0	1	2+0	0	1+0	0	0+0	0
6	DF	(Republic of Ireland) IRL	Niall Canavan	12	0	10+0	0	2+0	0	0+0	0	0+0	0
7	FW	(England) ENG	Luke Williams	21	2	12+5	2	4+0	0	0+0	0	0+0	0
9	FW	(Republic of Ireland) IRL	Paddy Madden	36	18	32+0	15	3+0	2	1+0	1	0+0	0
10	FW	(Netherlands) NED	Kevin van Veen	23	2	10+9	2	2+1	0	0+1	0	0+0	0
11	MF	(Scotland) SCO	Jim O'Brien (on loan from Coventry City)	3	1	1+2	1	0+0	0	0+0	0	0+0	0
12	MF	(England) ENG	Neal Bishop	35	0	31+0	0	3+0	0	1+0	0	0+0	0
13	GK	(England) ENG	Joe Anyon	7	0	5+1	0	0+0	0	1+0	0	0+0	0
14	FW	(England) ENG	Greg Luer (on loan from Hull City)	3	0	0+3	0	0+0	0	0+0	0	0+0	0
15	MF	(England) ENG	Stephen Dawson	14	0	12+0	0	1+0	0	1+0	0	0+0	0
16	MF	(England) ENG	Hakeeb Adelakun	16	1	1+11	0	1+2	1	0+1	0	0+0	0
17	DF	(Republic of Ireland) IRL	Conor Townsend	6	0	6+0	0	0+0	0	0+0	0	0+0	0
18	MF	(England) ENG	Jack King	32	2	24+3	1	3+1	1	1+0	0	0+0	0
20	DF	(England) ENG	Charlie Goode	12	1	6+3	1	3+0	0	0+0	0	0+0	0
22	FW	(England) ENG	Tom Hopper	23	3	19+3	3	0+0	0	0+1	0	0+0	0
23	DF	(Scotland) SCO	Murray Wallace	19	2	18+0	2	1+0	0	0+0	0	0+0	0
26	MF	(Scotland) SCO	Jamie Ness	19	0	13+3	0	2+1	0	0+0	0	0+0	0
28	MF	(England) ENG	Gary McSheffrey	24	5	15+8	5	1+0	0	0+0	0	0+0	0
29	FW	(England) ENG	Kyle Wootton	12	1	1+9	1	1+1	0	0+0	0	0+0	0
33	DF	(England) ENG	Jordan Clarke	22	1	14+5	1	1+1	0	1+0	0	0+0	0
Players who have left the club during the season:
8	MF	(England) ENG	Dave Syers	3	0	0+3	0	0+0	0	0+0	0	0+0	0
11	FW	(England) ENG	Darius Henderson	16	0	4+9	0	1+1	0	1+0	0	0+0	0
17	MF	(England) ENG	Joe Lolley (on loan from Huddersfield Town)	5	0	3+2	0	0+0	0	0+0	0	0+0	0
19	MF	(England) ENG	Tommy Rowe (on loan from Wolverhampton Wanderers)	14	1	14+0	1	0+0	0	0+0	0	0+0	0

==== Goals record ====
As of 27 February 2017

Rank	No.	Po.	Name	League One	FA Cup	League Cup	League Trophy	Total	
1	9	FW	(Republic of Ireland) Paddy Madden	15	2	1	0	18	
2	28	MF	(England) Gary McSheffrey	5	0	0	0	5	
3	22	FW	(England) Tom Hopper	3	0	0	0	3	
4	3	DF	(Northern Ireland) Scott Laird	2	0	0	0	2	
4	10	FW	(Netherlands) Kevin van Veen	2	0	0	0	2	
4	18	MF	(England) Jack King	1	1	0	0	2	
4	23	DF	(Scotland) Murray Wallace	2	0	0	0	2	
7	5	DF	(England) David Mirfin	1	0	0	0	1	
7	7	FW	(England) Luke Williams	1	0	0	0	1	
7	11	MF	(Scotland) Jim O'Brien	1	0	0	0	1	
7	16	MF	(England) Hakeeb Adelakun	0	1	0	0	1	
7	~~19~~	MF	(England) Tommy Rowe	1	0	0	0	1	
7	20	DF	(England) Charlie Goode	1	0	0	0	1	
7	29	FW	(England) Kyle Wootton	1	0	0	0	1	
7	33	DF	(England) Jordan Clarke	1	0	0	0	1	
7	Total				37	5	1	0	42

==== Disciplinary record ====
As of 27 February 2016

No.	Po.	Name	League One		FA Cup		League Cup		League Trophy		Total	
No.	Po.	Name	Booked	Sent off (straight red)	Booked	Sent off (straight red)	Booked	Sent off (straight red)	Booked	Sent off (straight red)	Booked	Sent off (straight red)
1	GK	(England) Luke Daniels	0	1	0	0	0	0	0	0	0	1
2	DF	(Gibraltar) Scott Wiseman	3	0	0	0	0	0	0	0	3	0
3	DF	(England) Scott Laird	5	0	1	0	1	0	0	0	7	0
4	MF	(England) Sean McAllister	2	0	0	0	0	0	0	0	2	0
5	DF	(England) David Mirfin	1	0	0	0	0	0	0	0	1	0
7	FW	(England) Luke Williams	2	0	1	0	0	0	0	0	3	0
9	FW	(Republic of Ireland) Paddy Madden	4	0	0	0	0	0	0	0	4	0
10	FW	(Netherlands) Kevin van Veen	4	0	0	0	0	0	0	0	4	0
~~11~~	FW	(England) Darius Henderson	1	0	0	0	0	0	0	0	1	0
12	MF	(England) Neal Bishop	8	0	0	0	0	0	0	0	8	0
15	MF	(England) Stephen Dawson	2	0	1	0	0	0	0	0	3	0
16	MF	(England) Hakeeb Adelakun	1	0	0	0	0	0	0	0	1	0
17	DF	(Republic of Ireland) Conor Townsend	1	0	0	0	0	0	0	0	1	0
18	MF	(England) Jack King	4	0	0	0	1	0	0	0	5	0
~~19~~	MF	(England) Tommy Rowe	2	0	0	0	0	0	0	0	2	0
20	DF	(England) Charlie Goode	2	0	2	0	0	0	0	0	4	0
22	FW	(England) Tom Hopper	1	0	0	0	0	0	0	0	1	0
23	DF	(Scotland) Murray Wallace	2	0	0	0	0	0	0	0	2	0
26	MF	(Scotland) Jamie Ness	1	0	0	0	0	0	0	0	1	0
28	MF	(England) Gary McSheffrey	4	0	0	0	0	0	0	0	4	0
33	DF	(England) Jordan Clarke	5	0	0	0	0	0	0	0	5	0
Total			52	1	5	0	2	0	0	0	59	1

== Transfers ==
=== Transfers in ===
Date from	Position	Nationality	Name	From	Fee	Ref.
1 July 2015	CB	ENG	Isaac Assenso	Leeds United	Free transfer	
1 July 2015	CM	IRL	Stephen Dawson	Rochdale	Free transfer	
1 July 2015	CB	ENG	Charlie Goode	Hendon	Free transfer	
1 July 2015	CF	ENG	Tom Hopper	Leicester City	Free transfer	
1 July 2015	AM	ENG	Jack King	Preston North End	Free transfer	
1 July 2015	LB	ENG	Scott Laird	Preston North End	Free transfer	
1 July 2015	MF	ENG	Levi Sutton	Academy	Trainee	
1 July 2015	RB	GIB	Scott Wiseman	Preston North End	Free transfer	
2 July 2015	CF	ENG	Luke Williams	Middlesbrough	Free transfer	
10 July 2015	CM	SCO	Jamie Ness	Stoke City	Free transfer	
24 July 2015	CF	ENG	Darius Henderson	Leyton Orient	Free transfer	
2 January 2016	CB	SCO	Murray Wallace	Huddersfield Town	Undisclosed	
6 January 2016	LB	IRL	Conor Townsend	Hull City	Free transfer	
1 February 2016	AM	ENG	Dominic Vose	Wrexham	Undisclosed	

=== Transfers out ===
Date from	Position	Nationality	Name	To	Fee	Ref.
1 July 2015	CB	ENG	Callum Howe	Lincoln City (Note: Following Howe's release on 5 May 2015, he later signed for Lincoln City on 15 July 2015.)	Free transfer	
1 July 2015	CF	NIR	Billy Kee	Accrington Stanley	Free transfer	
1 July 2015	CB	ESP	Miguel Llera	Free agent	Released	
1 July 2015	LM	ENG	Jennison Myrie-Williams	Free agent	Released	
1 July 2015	CB	IRL	Eddie Nolan	York City (Note: Following Nolan's release on 5 May 2015, he later signed for York City on 6 July 2015.)	Free transfer	
1 July 2015	GK	ENG	James Severn	Free agent	Released	
1 July 2015	GK	ENG	Sam Slocombe	Oxford United (Note: Following Slocombe's release on 5 May 2015, he later signed for Oxford United on 12 June 2015.)	Free transfer	
1 July 2015	AM	ENG	Matt Sparrow	Lincoln City (Note: Following Sparrow's release on 5 May 2015, he later signed for Lincoln City on 24 June 2015.)	Free transfer	
1 July 2015	LB	ENG	Marcus Williams	Free agent	Released	
14 July 2015	CF	MSR	Lyle Taylor	AFC Wimbledon	Undisclosed	
31 July 2015	CB	ENG	Taron Hare	York City	Free transfer	
18 January 2016	CM	ENG	Dave Syers	Rochdale	Free transfer	
5 February 2016	CF	ENG	Darius Henderson	Coventry City	Free transfer	

=== Loans in ===
Date from	Position	Nationality	Name	From	Date until	Ref.
10 August 2015	GK	ENG	Rory Watson	Hull City	7 September 2015	
25 August 2015	CB	SCO	Murray Wallace	Huddersfield Town	31 October 2015	(Note: On 28 September 2015, Wallace's loan was extended until 31 October 2015.)
25 September 2015	RW	ENG	Joe Lolley	Huddersfield Town	24 October 2015	
2 October 2015	LW	ENG	Tommy Rowe	Wolverhampton Wanderers	28 December 2015	
9 February 2016	CF	ENG	Greg Luer	Hull City	8 March 2016	
15 February 2016	WG	SCO	Jim O'Brien	Coventry City	Undisclosed	

=== Loans out ===
Date from	Position	Nationality	Name	To	Date until	Ref.
20 August 2015	CB	ENG	Andrew Boyce	Hartlepool United	31 October 2015	(Note: On 23 September 2015, Boyce's loan at Hartlepool was extended until 31 October 2015.)
1 September 2015	RM	ENG	Terry Hawkridge	Lincoln City	4 January 2016	
29 September 2015	DM	ENG	Isaac Assenso	Scarborough Athletic	25 October 2015	
1 February 2016	CF	NED	Kevin van Veen	SC Cambuur Leeuwarden	End of Season	
15 February 2016	CB	IRL	Niall Canavan	Rochdale	Undisclosed	
