= Paddy Madden =

Irish footballer (born 1990)

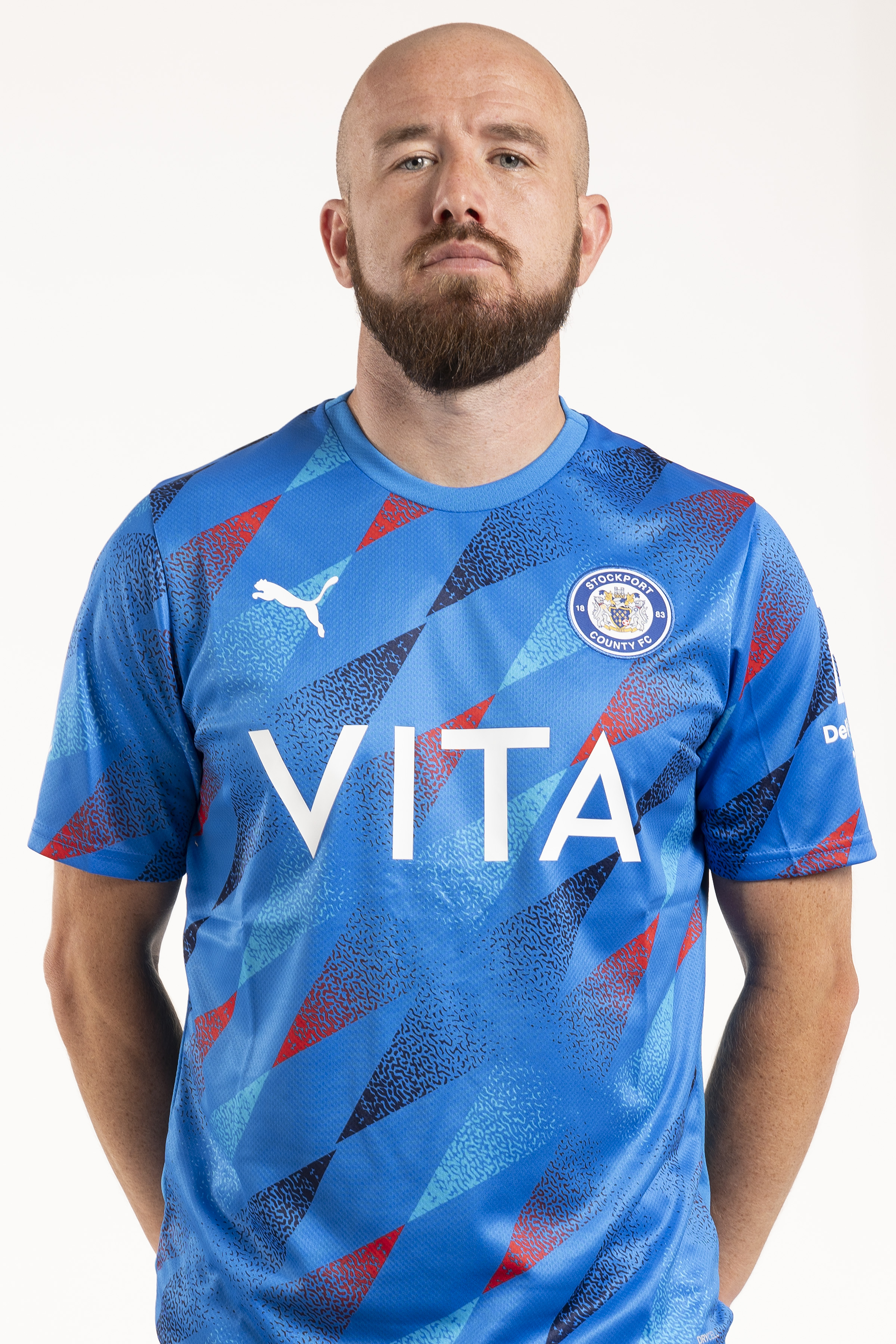
- Madden with Stockport County in 2023

Personal information
- Full name: Patrick Stephen Madden
- Date of birth: 4 March 1990 (age 36)
- Place of birth: Dublin, Ireland
- Height: 1.83 m (6 ft 0 in)
- Positions: Striker; second striker

Team information
- Current team: Bohemians
- Number: 41

Youth career
- –2008: WFTA

Senior career*
Years	Team	Apps	(Gls)
2008–2011	Bohemians	53	(14)
2009	→ Shelbourne (loan)	14	(6)
2011–2013	Carlisle United	32	(2)
2012–2013	→ Yeovil Town (loan)	15	(9)
2013–2014	Yeovil Town	29	(13)
2014–2018	Scunthorpe United	167	(52)
2018–2021	Fleetwood Town	131	(43)
2021–2024	Stockport County	136	(57)
2024–2026	Chesterfield	28	(5)
2025–2026	→ Accrington Stanley (loan)	32	(6)
2026–	Bohemians	2	(0)

International career^{‡}
2007–2008	Republic of Ireland U18	2	(1)
2008	Republic of Ireland U19	6	(0)
2009–2011	Republic of Ireland U21	2	(0)
2010	Republic of Ireland U23	1	(1)
2010	League of Ireland XI	1	(0)
2013	Republic of Ireland	1	(0)
- * Club domestic league appearances and goals as of 16:15, 24 September 2026 (UTC) ‡ National team caps and goals as of 14 August 2013

Patrick Stephen Madden (born 4 March 1990) is an Irish professional footballer who plays as a striker for League of Ireland club Bohemians. He represented the Republic of Ireland national team at various levels, playing once for the senior team in 2013.

== Club career ==
=== Bohemians ===
Madden signed league forms with Bohemians on 8 July 2008, and scored several times for the Bohemians "A" Team on their path to the Grand Final of the A League in that year. He made his Bohemians first team debut as a substitute in their 2–0 win over Cobh Ramblers on 8 November 2008.

Prior to the start of the 2009 season, Madden joined Shelbourne on loan on 10 February 2009. Bohemians manager Pat Fenlon sent the young striker out on loan hoping for Madden to gain first team experience. Madden made an immediate impression for Shelbourne by scoring in his first competitive appearance for Shels in their opening First Division match against Wexford Youths at Tolka Park on 6 March 2009. He also scored against his own employers for Shelbourne during an EA Sports Cup 2nd round tie at Dalymount Park on 4 May 2009. Madden's loan spell at Shelbourne concluded on 29 June 2009 and he returned to Bohemians. During his loan spell at Shelbourne, Madden made 16 league and cup appearances and scored 8 goals.

On 29 September 2009, Madden scored his first goal for Bohs in a 1–0 victory over Derry City in the Brandywell which led to Bohs returning to the top of the league.

In the 2010 season, Madden scored 9 goals in 5 matches, and he was voted the Soccer Writers Association of Ireland Player of the Month for June.

=== Carlisle United ===
Madden signed for English League One side Carlisle United on 31 January 2011, for an undisclosed fee signing a two-and-a-half-year contract with the Cumbrian club.

On 4 October 2012, Madden joined League One club Yeovil Town on an initial one-month loan deal with a view to extend to gain some much needed pitch time after not featuring in Carlisle's starting league squad this season. He had scored 1 goal in 3 substitute appearances for the Cumbrians this campaign. On 6 October 2012, he made his debut for Yeovil and scored a two goals in a 3–1 home victory against Colchester United. After going on a run of five goals in five games, he extended his loan until 2013. On 1 January 2013, Madden scored a brace in the final match of his loan spell against Leyton Orient ending with nine goals from sixteen games for Yeovil. Following the game it was announced Madden had signed permanently for Yeovil Town for an undisclosed fee on a two-and-a-half-year deal. Madden then went on to score 4 goals in his first two games as a permanent Yeovil Town player in the month of January. By mid February he was already League One top scorer, with 18 goals, despite only starting playing in October. In an interview with the BBC after this run of form he was described by his manager Gary Johnson as "the bargain of the season". Madden's contribution of 6 goals to Yeovil's perfect January of 3 out of 3 wins didn't go unrecognised as he won the League One Player of the Month award. Madden scored in the 2013 League One play-off final as Yeovil beat Brentford 2–1 to earn promotion to the Championship for the first time in the club's history. Madden ended the season with the League One golden boot with 23 goals (1 for Carlisle), plus his 2013 League One play-off final goal to make it 24 in all competitions. On 26 November 2013, with Madden having failed to score since Yeovil's promotion to the Championship, he was placed on the transfer list by the club.

=== Scunthorpe United ===
On 10 January 2014, Madden signed for Football League Two side Scunthorpe United for an undisclosed fee, believed to be £300,000, signing a 2 1/2-year contract. Madden's first game for Scunthorpe came on 11 January 2014 in a 0–2 away win over Mansfield Town. He scored his first goal for the club in a 5–1 win over Portsmouth on 22 February 2014.

Madden helped the club gain promotion to League One at the end of the 2013–14 season, scoring 5 goals in the process. For the following two seasons, Madden was the club's most prolific goalscorer, netting 16 goals in all competitions during 2014–15, and 23 goals in all competitions during 2015–16.

Madden suffered a significant downturn of form during Scunthorpe's play-off push in the 2016–17 season, despite featuring in the majority of the Iron's games. This downturn in form continued into the next season, with Madden scoring only 2 league goals during the very early stages of the 2017–18 season. Madden failed to score in any of his last 16 league appearances for the Iron.

Despite his downturn in form, Madden scored 60 goals across all competitions during his time with the Iron, placing him as the club's 10th most prolific goalscorer of all time.

=== Fleetwood Town ===
On 2 January 2018, Madden signed for fellow League One side Fleetwood Town for an undisclosed fee, believed to be £150,000, signing a 2 1/2-year contract.

He scored his 100th goal in English football in Fleetwood Town's FA Cup tie against Guiseley on 3 December 2018.

In May 2019 he signed a new three-year contract with the club.

During the 2020–21 season, Madden was sidelined for multiple matches after testing positive for COVID-19. At the time of Madden's departure from Fleetwood Town in March 2021, he was the club's all-time top scorer in the EFL with 43 goals. In all competitions, Madden scored 53 goals in 149 appearances for Fleetwood after joining the club from Scunthorpe United in January 2018.

=== Stockport County ===
On 15 March 2021, Madden signed for National League side Stockport County for an undisclosed fee, signing a three-year deal. Madden was awarded the National League Player of the Month award for March 2022 after scoring four goals and assisting three as his side won all five of their league matches across the month as his side moved eleven points clear at the top of the table. Madden scored the first goal on the final day of the season as Stockport defeated FC Halifax Town 2–0, securing the league title.

Following a slow start to the season for both player and club, Madden was awarded the EFL League Two Player of the Month award for October 2022 having contributed to a goal in all six of Stockport's matches.

On 16 December 2023, Madden scored a hat-trick against Sutton United in an 8–0 rout. On 17 April 2024, Madden scored a third hat-trick of the 2023–24 season in a 5–2 victory over Notts County, the victory securing the League Two title. Seven goals in seven games saw Madden awarded the League Two Player of the Month award for April 2024.

On 6 May 2024, the club announced it had been unable to agree a new deal with Madden, who will leave the club in the summer when the previous contract expires.

=== Chesterfield ===
On 13 May 2024, newly promoted League Two side Chesterfield announced that Madden would join on a two-year deal upon the expiration of his contract with Stockport. On 22 May 2026, Chesterfield announced that Madden would be released following the end of his contract, after his loan season away from the club.

==== Accrington Stanley loan ====
On 21 August 2025, Madden joined fellow League Two club Accrington Stanley on loan until the end of the 2025–26 season. On 18 October 2025, Madden netted his first league goals and completed a hat-trick in a 4–0 victory over Swindon Town, assisting the other goal.

=== Return to Bohemians ===
On 11 August 2026, it was announced that Madden had returned to his first senior club Bohemians on a short-term contract until the end of the season.

== International career ==
Madden has represented the Republic of Ireland at U18 and U19 level and made his Republic of Ireland under-21 debut against Armenia in November 2009. In August 2013, Madden was called up for the first time to Republic of Ireland senior team to play Wales in a friendly. Madden made his debut coming on in the 69th minute.

== Career statistics ==
As of match played on 19 October 2026

Appearances and goals by club, season and competition
Club	Season	League			National Cup (Note: FAI Cup and FA Cup)		League Cup (Note: League of Ireland Cup and Football League Cup)		Europe		Other		Total	
Club	Season	Division	Apps	Goals	Apps	Goals	Apps	Goals	Apps	Goals	Apps	Goals	Apps	Goals
Bohemians	2008	League of Ireland Premier Division	1	0	0	0	0	0	0	0	—		1	0
Bohemians	2009	League of Ireland Premier Division	18	4	3	0	0	0	1 (Note: Appearances in UEFA Champions League)	0	1	0	23	4
Bohemians	2010	League of Ireland Premier Division	34	10	3	4	0	0	2	0	5	2	44	16
Bohemians	Total		53	14	6	4	0	0	3	0	6	2	68	20
Shelbourne (loan)	2009	League of Ireland First Division	14	6	0	0	2	2	—		—		16	8
Carlisle United	2010–11	League One	13	0	0	0	0	0	—		1 (Note: Appearances in Football League Trophy)	0	14	0
Carlisle United	2011–12	League One	18	1	1	0	0	0	—		0	0	19	1
Carlisle United	2012–13	League One	1	1	0	0	1	0	—		1	0	3	1
Carlisle United	Total		32	2	1	0	1	0	—		2	0	36	2
Yeovil Town	2012–13 (Note: Madden made sixteen appearances for Yeovil Town on loan from Carlisle United before signing permanently in the January transfer window.)	League One	35	22	1	0	0	0	—		3 (Note: Appearances in League One play-offs)	1	39	23
Yeovil Town	2013–14	Championship	9	0	0	0	1	0	—		—		10	0
Yeovil Town	Total		44	22	1	0	1	0	—		3	1	49	23
Scunthorpe United	2013–14	League Two	21	5	0	0	0	0	—		0	0	21	5
Scunthorpe United	2014–15	League One	46	14	5	2	2	0	—		2	1	55	17
Scunthorpe United	2015–16	League One	46	20	4	2	1	1	—		1	0	52	23
Scunthorpe United	2016–17	League One	34	11	1	0	0	0	—		5 (Note: Three appearances in EFL Trophy, two appearances in League One play-offs)	0	40	11
Scunthorpe United	2017–18	League One	20	2	2	0	2	2	—		4 (Note: Appearances in EFL Trophy)	0	28	4
Scunthorpe United	Total		167	52	12	4	5	3	—		12	1	195	60
Fleetwood Town	2017–18	League One	20	6	—		—		—		—		20	6
Fleetwood Town	2018–19	League One	44	15	3	4	2	0	—		0	0	49	19
Fleetwood Town	2019–20	League One	35	15	3	1	1	0	—		5 (Note: Four appearances and three goals in EFL Trophy, one appearance in League One play-offs)	3	44	19
Fleetwood Town	2020–21	League One	32	7	1	0	1	1	—		2	1	36	9
Fleetwood Town	Total		131	43	7	5	4	1	—		7	4	149	53
Stockport County	2020–21	National League	14	7	—		—		—		1 (Note: Appearance in National League play-offs)	0	15	7
Stockport County	2021–22	National League	43	23	4	2	—		—		2 (Note: Appearances in FA Trophy)	0	49	25
Stockport County	2022–23	League Two	37	10	3	1	0	0	—		3 (Note: Two appearances in EFL Trophy, one appearance in League Two play-offs)	0	43	11
Stockport County	2023–24	League Two	42	17	3	1	1	1	—		3	3	49	22
Stockport County	Total		136	57	10	4	1	1	—		9	3	156	65
Chesterfield	2024–25	League Two	27	5	1	0	0	0	—		1	1	29	6
Chesterfield	2025–26	League Two	1	0	0	0	0	0	—		0	0	1	0
Chesterfield	Total		28	5	1	0	0	0	—		1	1	30	6
Accrington Stanley (loan)	2025–26	League Two	32	6	2	2	1	0	—		3	0	38	8
Bohemians	2026	League of Ireland Premier Division	2	0	3	0	—		0	0	—		5	0
Career total			639	207	43	19	15	7	3	0	43	12	743	245

== Honours ==
Bohemians

- League of Ireland Premier Division: 2008, 2009
- Setanta Sports Cup: 2009–10

Carlisle United

- Football League Trophy: 2010–11

Yeovil Town

- Football League One play-offs: 2013

Stockport County

- EFL League Two: 2023–24
- National League: 2021–22

Individual

- League of Ireland Player of the Month: June 2010
- Football League One Player of the Month: January 2013
- Football League One Golden Boot: 2012–13
- PFA Team of the Year: 2012–13 League One
- Scunthorpe United Player of the Season: 2014–15
- National League Player of the Month: March 2022
- National League Team of the Season: 2021–22
- Stockport County Player of the Season: 2021–22
- EFL League Two Player of the Month: October 2022, April 2024
