= 2017–18 EFL Trophy =

Checkatrade Trophy

Tournament details
- Country: England; Wales
- Teams: 64

Final positions
- Champions: Lincoln City (1st title)
- Runners-up: Shrewsbury Town

Tournament statistics
- Top goal scorer(s): (England) Callum Hudson-Odoi Chelsea U21s (Curaçao) Kenji Gorré Swansea City U21s (England) Jack Payne Bradford City (4 Goals Each)

The 2017–18 EFL Trophy, known as the Checkatrade Trophy for sponsorship reasons, was the 37th season in the history of the competition, a knock-out tournament for English football clubs in League One and League Two of the English football system, and also including 16 Premier League and Championship "B teams" with Category One status after the previous season's trial format was extended.

Following the new format introduced in 2016–17, 64 teams entered the competition, including first time entries from the academy teams of Manchester City, Newcastle United and Tottenham Hotspur, who all declined to enter in the previous season. Coventry City were the reigning champions, but were eliminated in the group stage on 7 November.

== Participating clubs ==
- 48 clubs from League One and League Two.
- 16 invited Category One Academy teams.
- Category One teams relegated to League One missed out on having academies participate in the following tournament.

	League One	League Two	Academies
Clubs	AFC Wimbledon; Blackburn Rovers; Blackpool; Bradford City; Bristol Rovers; Bury; Charlton Athletic; Doncaster Rovers; Fleetwood Town; Gillingham; Milton Keynes Dons; Northampton Town; Oldham Athletic; Oxford United; Peterborough United; Plymouth Argyle; Portsmouth; Rochdale; Rotherham United; Scunthorpe United; Shrewsbury Town; Southend United; Walsall; Wigan Athletic	Accrington Stanley; Barnet; Cambridge United; Carlisle United; Cheltenham Town; Chesterfield; Colchester United; Coventry City; Crawley Town; Crewe Alexandra; Exeter City; Forest Green Rovers; Grimsby Town; Lincoln City; Luton Town; Mansfield Town; Morecambe; Newport County; Notts County; Port Vale; Stevenage; Swindon Town; Wycombe Wanderers; Yeovil Town	Brighton & Hove Albion; Chelsea; Everton; Fulham; Leicester City; Manchester City; Middlesbrough; Newcastle United; Reading; Southampton; Stoke City; Sunderland; Swansea City; Tottenham Hotspur; West Bromwich Albion; West Ham United
Total	24	24	16

Notes

Arsenal, Liverpool and Manchester United declined to participate.

== Eligibility criteria for players ==
- For EFL clubs; a minimum of 5 'First Team' players in the starting 11 as defined under the competition's existing rules.
- For invited clubs – 6 of the starting 11 to be U21 (as at 30 June 2016).

== Competition format ==
=== Group stage ===
- Sixteen groups of 4 teams will be organised on a regionalised basis.
- All groups will include one invited club.
- All clubs will play each other once, either home or away (Academies play all group matches away from home).
- Clubs will be awarded 3 points for a win and 1 point for a draw.
- In the event of a drawn game (after 90 minutes), a penalty shootout will be held with the winning team earning an additional point.
- The top two teams will progress to the Knockout Stage.

==== Northern Section ====
===== Group A =====
Pos	Lge	Team	Pld	W	PW	PL	L	GF	GA	GD	Pts	Qualification
1	L1	Fleetwood Town (Q)	3	3	0	0	0	7	2	+5	9	Round 2
2	ACA	Leicester City U21 (Q)	3	1	0	1	1	3	5	−2	4	Round 2
3	L2	Carlisle United (E)	3	1	0	0	2	3	3	0	3	
4	L2	Morecambe (E)	3	0	1	0	2	3	6	−3	2	

Updated to match(es) played on 8 November 2017. Source: EFL.com
(E) Eliminated; (Q) Qualified to the phase indicated

29 August 2017	Fleetwood Town	3–0	Leicester City U21	Highbury Stadium
19:45 BST	Ekpolo 28'; Cargill 61'; Burns 86'	Report		Attendance: 517; Referee: Martin Coy

29 August 2017	Morecambe	0–2	Carlisle United	Globe Arena
19:45 BST		Report	Hope 1'; Kennedy 44'	Attendance: 1,228; Referee: Seb Stockbridge

3 October 2017	Carlisle United	0–1	Leicester City U21	Brunton Park
19:45 BST		Report	Ndukwu 20'	Attendance: 1,009; Referee: Ben Toner

3 October 2017	Fleetwood Town	2–1	Morecambe	Highbury Stadium
19:45 BST	Burns 25'; McGowan 72' (o.g.)	Report	Ekpolo 51' (o.g.)	Attendance: 768; Referee: Eddie Ilderton

7 November 2017	Morecambe	2–2 (4–2 p)	Leicester City U21	Globe Arena
19:45 GMT	Thompson 8'; Osborne 90'	Report	Ndukwu 25'; Knight 85'	Attendance: 432; Referee: Robert Jones
	Penalties
	Rose (penalty scored); Turner (penalty missed); Lavelle (penalty scored); Osborne (penalty scored); Campbell (penalty scored)		Choudhury (penalty scored); Knight (penalty missed); Gordon (penalty missed); Uche (penalty scored)

8 November 2017	Carlisle United	1–2	Fleetwood Town	Brunton Park
19:45 GMT	T. Miller 86'	Report	Sowerby 10'; Burns 44'	Attendance: 909 (42 away fans); Referee: Martin Coy

===== Group B =====
Pos	Lge	Team	Pld	W	PW	PL	L	GF	GA	GD	Pts	Qualification
1	L1	Blackpool (Q)	3	2	0	1	0	7	3	+4	7	Round 2
2	L2	Accrington Stanley (Q)	3	2	0	0	1	8	4	+4	6	Round 2
3	L1	Wigan Athletic (E)	3	1	1	0	1	5	6	−1	5	
4	ACA	Middlesbrough U21 (E)	3	0	0	0	3	4	11	−7	0	

Updated to match(es) played on 7 November 2017. Source: EFL.com
(E) Eliminated; (Q) Qualified to the phase indicated

29 August 2017	Blackpool	1–1 (4–5 p)	Wigan Athletic	Bloomfield Road
19:00 BST	D'Almeida (yellow card) 4'; Sinclair-Smith 87'	Report	Merrie (yellow card) 13'; Gilbey 63'	Attendance: 1,532; Referee: Jeremy Simpson
	Penalties
	Taylor (penalty scored); Clayton (penalty missed); Mellor (penalty scored); Delfouneso (penalty scored); Roache (penalty scored); Sinclair-Smith (penalty missed)		Power (penalty scored); Gilbey (penalty scored); Hunt (penalty scored); Maffeo (penalty scored); Barrigan (penalty missed); Laurent (penalty scored)

19 September 2017	Accrington Stanley	3–2	Middlesbrough U21	Crown Ground
19:00 BST	Brown 54'; Wilks 69'; Johnson (yellow card) 81'; Nolan 90+3'	Report	Reading (yellow card) 27' (goal) 31'; Armstrong (yellow card) 16' (goal) 65'	Attendance: 587; Referee: Graham Salisbury

3 October 2017	Accrington Stanley	1–2	Blackpool	Crown Ground
19:30 BST	Sousa 38'	Report	Philliskirk 33'; Clayton 88'	Attendance: 975; Referee: Stuart Attwell

24 October 2017	Wigan Athletic	4–1	Middlesbrough U21	DW Stadium
19:45 BST	Evans 33'; Maffeo 41'; Hunt 72'; Colclough 74'	Report	Armstrong 53'	Attendance: 876; Referee: Michael Salisbury

1 November 2017	Blackpool	4–1	Middlesbrough U21	Bloomfield Road
19:00 GMT	Philliskirk 24', 89'; Longstaff 43'; D'Almeida 56'; Richards (yellow card) 87'	Report	Armstrong 54'; Brewitt (yellow card) 85'	Attendance: 691; Referee: Martin Coy

7 November 2017	Wigan Athletic	0–4	Accrington Stanley	DW Stadium
19:45 GMT	Golden (yellow card) 24'; McGuffie (yellow card) 65'	Report	Edwards 12'; Sousa 30', 56'; Wilks (yellow card) 65'; Leacock-McLeod 89'	Attendance: 1,473; Referee: Jeremy Simpson

===== Group C =====
Pos	Lge	Team	Pld	W	PW	PL	L	GF	GA	GD	Pts	Qualification
1	L1	Rochdale (Q)	3	1	1	1	0	5	1	+4	6	Round 2
2	L1	Bury (Q)	3	2	0	0	1	4	5	−1	6	Round 2
3	L1	Blackburn Rovers (E)	3	1	0	1	1	2	2	0	4	
4	ACA	Stoke City U21 (E)	3	0	1	0	2	1	4	−3	2	

Updated to match(es) played on 8 November 2017. Source: EFL.com
(E) Eliminated; (Q) Qualified to the phase indicated

29 August 2017	Blackburn Rovers	1–0	Stoke City U21	Ewood Park
19:45 BST	Nuttall 77'	Report	Banks (yellow card) 21'; Souttar (yellow card) 54'; Adam (yellow card) 90+7'	Attendance: 1,501; Referee: Darren Handley

19 September 2017	Bury	0–4	Rochdale	Gigg Lane
19:45 BST	Danns (yellow card) 6'; Shotton (yellow card) 60'	Report	Bunney 12'; Inman 18', 34'; Henderson 51'; Rafferty (yellow card) 62'	Attendance: 1,451; Referee: Mark Heywood

3 October 2017	Blackburn Rovers	0–1	Bury	Ewood Park
19:45 BST	Platt (yellow card) 64'; Hart (yellow card) 86'	Report	Skarz (yellow card) 40'; Williams (yellow card) 64'; Bunn 77'	Attendance: 2,025; Referee: Scott Oldham

3 October 2017	Rochdale	0–0 (4–5 p)	Stoke City U21	Spotland Stadium
19:45 BST	Ntlhe (yellow card) 74'	Report	Edwards (red card) 24'; Waddington (yellow card) 41'	Attendance: 731; Referee: Martin Coy
	Penalties
	Slew (penalty scored); Done (penalty missed); M.J. Williams (penalty scored); Kitching (penalty scored); Rafferty (penalty scored); J. Williams (penalty missed); Rathbone (penalty missed)		Campbell (penalty scored); Souttar (penalty missed); Pemberton (penalty scored); Waddington (penalty scored); Jarvis (penalty scored); McJannett (penalty missed); Shenton (penalty scored)

7 November 2017	Rochdale	1–1 (5–3 p)	Blackburn Rovers	Spotland Stadium
19:45 GMT	Slew 72'	Report	Wharton (red card) 28'; Hart (yellow card) 41'; Nuttall 43'	Attendance: 1,080; Referee: Seb Stockbridge
	Penalties
	Rafferty (penalty scored); Inman (penalty scored); Slew (penalty scored); Gillam (penalty scored); Bunney (penalty scored)		Hart (penalty scored); Ward (penalty scored); Smallwood (penalty missed); Bennett (penalty scored)

8 November 2017	Bury	3–1	Stoke City U21	Gigg Lane
19:45 GMT	Ajose 5'; Leigh 18'; Reilly 19'	Report	Afellay 75'	Attendance: 686; Referee: Graham Salisbury

===== Group D =====
Pos	Lge	Team	Pld	W	PW	PL	L	GF	GA	GD	Pts	Qualification
1	L2	Port Vale (Q)	3	2	1	0	0	5	2	+3	8	Round 2
2	L1	Oldham Athletic (Q)	3	2	0	1	0	5	1	+4	7	Round 2
3	ACA	Newcastle United U21 (E)	3	1	0	0	2	3	6	−3	3	
4	L2	Crewe Alexandra (E)	3	0	0	0	3	3	7	−4	0	

Updated to match(es) played on 7 November 2017. Source: EFL.com
(E) Eliminated; (Q) Qualified to the phase indicated

29 August 2017	Crewe Alexandra	1–2	Newcastle United U21	Gresty Road
19:30 BST	Bowery 88'	Report	Smith 4'; Charman 68'	Attendance: 1,351; Referee: Robert Jones

29 August 2017	Oldham Athletic	0–0 (2–4 p)	Port Vale	Boundary Park
19:30 BST		Report		Attendance: 1,424; Referee: Michael Salisbury
	Penalties
	Gerrard (penalty scored); Fawns (penalty missed); Gardner (penalty scored)		Tonge (penalty scored); Gunning (penalty scored); Pope (penalty scored); Denton (penalty scored)

3 October 2017	Crewe Alexandra	0–1	Oldham Athletic	Gresty Road
19:30 BST	Porter (yellow card) 34'; Stubbs (yellow card) 69'	Report	Byrne (yellow card) 38' (goal) 42'	Attendance: 976; Referee: Seb Stockbridge

3 October 2017	Port Vale	1–0	Newcastle United U21	Vale Park
19:45 BST	Barnett 21'	Report		Attendance: 824; Referee: David Coote

7 November 2017	Oldham Athletic	4–1	Newcastle United U21	Boundary Park
19:30 GMT	Byrne 13', 63'; Doyle 61', 70'	Report	Aarons 79'	Attendance: 1,107; Referee: Carl Boyeson

7 November 2017	Port Vale	4–2	Crewe Alexandra	Vale Park
19:45 GMT	Regis 4'; Forrester 8'; Reeves 65'; Montaño 90'	Report	Reilly 31', 71'	Attendance: 1,322; Referee: John Brooks

===== Group E =====
Pos	Lge	Team	Pld	W	PW	PL	L	GF	GA	GD	Pts	Qualification
1	L1	Walsall (Q)	3	2	0	1	0	6	3	+3	7	Round 2
2	L1	Shrewsbury Town (Q)	3	2	0	0	1	6	3	+3	6	Round 2
3	L2	Coventry City (E)	3	1	1	0	1	6	6	0	5	
4	ACA	West Bromwich Albion U21 (E)	3	0	0	0	3	2	8	−6	0	

Updated to match(es) played on 3 October 2017. Source: EFL.com
(E) Eliminated; (Q) Qualified to the phase indicated

29 August 2017	Coventry City	2–3	Shrewsbury Town	Ricoh Arena
19:45 BST	Andreu 51' (yellow card) 66'; McNulty 63' (pen.)	Report	Payne 30'; Gnahoua 33'; Bolton (red card) 69'; Godfrey (yellow card) 71'; Adams (yellow card) 79'; Riley 90+4'	Attendance: 1,968; Referee: Tom Nield

19 September 2017	Walsall	3–1	West Bromwich Albion U21	Bescot Stadium
19:45 BST	Flanagan 55'; Ismail 73'; Leahy 80'	Report	Tulloch 45+2'; Azaz (yellow card) 65'; Bradley (yellow card) 86'	Attendance: 1,055; Referee: Darren Handley

3 October 2017	Shrewsbury Town	3–0	West Bromwich Albion U21	New Meadow
19:45 BST	John-Lewis 24'; Morris 49'; Beckles (yellow card) 53'; Dodds 75'	Report		Attendance: 1,404; Referee: Michael Salisbury

3 October 2017	Walsall	2–2 (3–4 p)	Coventry City	Bescot Stadium
19:45 BST	Ismail 32' (pen.); Bakayoko (yellow card) 42'; Edwards (yellow card) 82'; Agyei 90+2'	Report	McNulty 54'; Ponticelli 59'	Attendance: 1,517; Referee: Robert Lewis
	Penalties
	Oztumer (penalty scored); Leahy (penalty scored); Agyei (penalty missed); Bakayoko (penalty scored); Edwards (penalty missed)		McNulty (penalty missed); Vincenti (penalty scored); Stevenson (penalty scored); Shipley (penalty scored); Ponticelli (penalty scored)

7 November 2017	Coventry City	2–1	West Bromwich Albion U21	Coventry
19:45 GMT	Stevenson 58'; Biamou 62'	Report	Burke 72'	Stadium: Ricoh Arena; Attendance: 1,429; Referee: John Busby

7 November 2017	Shrewsbury Town	0–1	Walsall	Shrewsbury
19:45 GMT	Godfrey (red card) 75'	Report	Bakayoko 90'	Stadium: New Meadow; Attendance: 1,701; Referee: Trevor Kettle

===== Group F =====
Pos	Lge	Team	Pld	W	PW	PL	L	GF	GA	GD	Pts	Qualification
1	L1	Bradford City (Q)	3	2	0	0	1	6	6	0	6	Round 2
2	L2	Chesterfield (Q)	3	1	1	0	1	6	7	−1	5	Round 2
3	L1	Rotherham United (E)	3	1	0	1	1	5	3	+2	4	
4	ACA	Manchester City EDS (E)	3	0	1	1	1	4	5	−1	3	

Updated to match(es) played on 7 November 2017. Source: EFL.com
(E) Eliminated; (Q) Qualified to the phase indicated

15 August 2017	Rotherham United	1–1 (2–4 p)	Manchester City EDS	New York Stadium
19:00 BST	Vaulks (yellow card) 48'; Ball 64'	Report	Latibeaudiere (yellow card) 67'; Garré 90+4'	Attendance: 2,562; Referee: Anthony Backhouse
	Penalties
	Vaulks (penalty missed); Taylor (penalty missed); Forde (penalty scored); Clarke-Harris (penalty scored)		Nmecha (penalty scored); Smith (penalty scored); Richards (penalty scored); Davenport (penalty missed); Oliver (penalty scored)

29 August 2017	Chesterfield	2–4	Bradford City	Proact Stadium
19:00 BST	Dennis 24' (yellow card) 65'; Sinnott 79'; Evatt (yellow card) 85'	Report	Patrick 45+3'; Jones 57', 62' (yellow card) 77'; Hanson 80'	Attendance: 1,099; Referee: Carl Boyeson

3 October 2017	Rotherham United	1–2	Chesterfield	New York Stadium
19:00 BST	Vaulks 71'	Report	De Girolamo 9'; McCourt 89'	Attendance: 2,043; Referee: Darren Handley

24 October 2017	Bradford City	2–1	Manchester City EDS	Valley Parade
19:30 BST	Thompson 18'; Jones 35'	Report	Francis (yellow card) 8'; Matondo 57'; Richards (yellow card) 66'; Pozo (yellow card) 89'	Attendance: 1,260; Referee: Scott Oldham

7 November 2017	Bradford City	0–3	Rotherham United	Valley Parade
19:30 GMT		Report	Yates 17'; Clarke-Harris 32' (pen.); Towell 45+1'	Attendance: 931; Referee: Rob Lewis

29 November 2017	Chesterfield	2–2 (4–3 p)	Manchester City EDS	Proact Stadium
19:00 GMT	Rowley 73'; O'Grady 90+7'	Report	Oliver (red card) 75'; Francis 88'; Nmecha 90'	Attendance: 1,266; Referee: Darren Drysdale
	Penalties
	Kellett (penalty missed); Reed (penalty scored); Rowley (penalty scored); O'Grady (penalty scored); Hird (penalty scored)		Nmecha (penalty scored); Francis (penalty scored); Richards (penalty scored); Duhaney (penalty missed); Wilson (penalty missed)

===== Group G =====
Pos	Lge	Team	Pld	W	PW	PL	L	GF	GA	GD	Pts	Qualification
1	L2	Lincoln City (Q)	3	3	0	0	0	7	3	+4	9	Round 2
2	L2	Mansfield Town (Q)	3	2	0	0	1	4	4	0	6	Round 2
3	L2	Notts County (E)	3	1	0	0	2	4	5	−1	3	
4	ACA	Everton U21 (E)	3	0	0	0	3	2	5	−3	0	

Updated to match(es) played on 7 November 2017. Source: EFL.com
(E) Eliminated; (Q) Qualified to the phase indicated

15 August 2017	Notts County	2–1	Everton U21	Meadow Lane
19:45 BST	Forte 30'; Hollis 36'	Report	Donkor 55'	Attendance: 1,409; Referee: Scott Oldham

29 August 2017	Mansfield Town	1–3	Lincoln City	Field Mill
19:45 BST	Potter 6'; MacDonald (yellow card) 38'; Digby (yellow card) 42'	Report	Whitehouse 40'; Palmer 79'; Eardley (yellow card) 85'; Waterfall (yellow card) 90'; Green 90+5'	Attendance: 2,495; Referee: David Webb

24 October 2017	Lincoln City	2–1	Everton U21	Sincil Bank
19:45 BST	Maguire-Drew 3' 23'; Farman (yellow card) 83'	Report	Baxter (yellow card) 51'; Adeniran 81'; Lavery (yellow card) 83'	Attendance: 3,713; Referee: Graham Salisbury

24 October 2017	Notts County	1–2	Mansfield Town	Meadow Lane
19:45 BST	Smith 34' (yellow card) 74'	Report	Angol 1' (yellow card) 35'; Mellis (yellow card) 34'; Hamilton 73'	Attendance: 2,290; Referee: Graham Horwood

31 October 2017	Mansfield Town	1–0	Everton U21	Field Mill
19:45 GMT	Butcher (yellow card) 4'; Spencer (yellow card) 69'; Diamond 81'; Potter (yellow card) 83'	Report	Adeniran (yellow card) 62'	Attendance: 964; Referee: Michael Salisbury

7 November 2017	Lincoln City	2–1	Notts County	Sincil Bank
19:45 GMT	Bird 37' (o.g.); Ginnelly 86'	Report	Forte 27'; Hollis (yellow card) 52'; Smith (yellow card) 87'	Attendance: 3,026; Referee: Tom Nield

===== Group H =====
Pos	Lge	Team	Pld	W	PW	PL	L	GF	GA	GD	Pts	Qualification
1	L1	Scunthorpe United (Q)	3	2	0	1	0	6	3	+3	7	Round 2
2	L1	Doncaster Rovers (Q)	3	1	2	0	0	3	2	+1	7	Round 2
3	L2	Grimsby Town (E)	3	0	0	2	1	3	4	−1	2	
4	ACA	Sunderland U21 (E)	3	0	1	0	2	2	5	−3	2	

Updated to match(es) played on 8 October 2017. Source: EFL.com
(E) Eliminated; (Q) Qualified to the phase indicated

29 August 2017	Grimsby Town	1–1 (3–4 p)	Doncaster Rovers	Blundell Park
19:45 BST	Jones (yellow card) 20'; Cardwell 29'; Davies (yellow card) 69'	Report	Williams 38'; Mandeville (yellow card) 86'	Attendance: 862; Referee: Mike Jones
	Penalties
	Davies (penalty scored); Hooper (penalty scored); Mills (penalty scored); Jones (penalty missed); Bolarinwa (penalty missed); Cardwell (penalty missed)		Middleton (penalty scored); Williams (penalty missed); Beestin (penalty scored); Mandeville (penalty missed); Alcock (penalty scored); Kongolo (penalty scored)

29 August 2017	Scunthorpe United	3–1	Sunderland U21	Glanford Park
19:45 BST	van Veen 3'; Holmes 45+4' (yellow card) 86'; Adelakun (yellow card) 82'; Morris 90'	Report	Love (yellow card) 62'; Greenwood 65'	Attendance: 1,127; Referee: Darren Drysdale

3 October 2017	Doncaster Rovers	1–0	Sunderland U21	Keepmoat Stadium
19:30 BST	Ben Khémis 69'	Report	Love (yellow card) 38'	Attendance: 1,520; Referee: Ross Joyce

3 October 2017	Scunthorpe United	2–1	Grimsby Town	Glanford Park
19:45 BST	Madden (yellow card) 20'; Hopper 43', 80'; Redmond (yellow card) 50'; van Veen (yellow card) 90+2'	Report	Jaiyesimi 32'	Attendance: 1,987; Referee: Tom Nield

31 October 2017	Doncaster Rovers	1–1 (3–2 p)	Scunthorpe United	Keepmoat Stadium
19:30 GMT	Mandeville 37'	Report	Lewis 55'; Goode (yellow card) 77'; Adelakun (yellow card) 83'	Attendance: 1,717; Referee: Ben Toner
	Penalties
	Mason (penalty scored); Beestin (penalty missed); Fletcher (penalty missed); Mandeville (penalty scored); Ben Khémis (penalty scored)		van Veen (penalty scored); Madden (penalty missed); Lewis (penalty missed); Adelakun (penalty missed); Goode (penalty scored)

8 November 2017	Grimsby Town	1–1 (6–7 p)	Sunderland U21	Blundell Park
19:45 GMT	Hooper 78' (pen.)	Report	Love 79'; Bale (yellow card) 90+3'	Attendance: 248; Referee: Scott Oldham
	Penalties
	Hooper (penalty scored); Kelly (penalty missed); Jaiyesimi (penalty scored); Rose (penalty scored); Matt (penalty missed); Mills (penalty scored); Osborne (penalty scored); Cardwell (penalty scored); McAllister (penalty missed)		Beadling (penalty missed); Molyneux (penalty scored); Robson (penalty scored); Love (penalty scored); Hackett (penalty missed); Greenwood (penalty scored); Galloway (penalty scored); Rodwell (penalty scored); Bale (penalty scored)

==== Southern Section ====
===== Group A =====
Pos	Lge	Team	Pld	W	PW	PL	L	GF	GA	GD	Pts	Qualification
1	L1	Portsmouth (Q)	3	2	0	1	0	7	4	+3	7	Round 2
2	L1	Charlton Athletic (Q)	3	2	0	0	1	5	3	+2	6	Round 2
3	ACA	Fulham U21 (E)	3	1	1	0	1	8	7	+1	5	
4	L2	Crawley Town (E)	3	0	0	0	3	2	8	−6	0	

Updated to match(es) played on 7 November 2017. Source: EFL.com
(E) Eliminated; (Q) Qualified to the phase indicated

16 August 2017	Portsmouth	3–3 (2–4 p)	Fulham U21	Fratton Park
19:45 BST	Lowe 54' 66'; Naismith 57'	Report	Humphrys 21'; Williams 62' (pen.); Adebayo 82'	Attendance: 1,520; Referee: Antony Coggins
	Penalties
	Chaplin (penalty scored); Naismith (penalty missed); Bennett (penalty scored); Evans (penalty missed)		Williams (penalty scored); Humphrys (penalty scored); Þorsteinsson (penalty scored); Kavanagh (penalty scored)

29 August 2017	Crawley Town	0–2	Charlton Athletic	Broadfield Stadium
19:45 BST	Kaby (yellow card) 10'; Yorwerth (yellow card) 43'; Sanoh (yellow card) 59'	Report	Reeves 37'; Lapslie 70'	Attendance: 1,666; Referee: Nick Kinseley

3 October 2017	Portsmouth	3–1	Crawley Town	Fratton Park
19:45 BST	May (yellow card) 27'; Clarke 30'; Hawkins 34'; O’Keefe 71'	Report	Kaby (yellow card) 53'; Sanoh 65'	Attendance: 1,527; Referee: Tim Robinson

1 November 2017	Charlton Athletic	3–2	Fulham U21	The Valley
19:45 GMT	Reeves 30'; Dodoo 89'; Aribo 90+1'	Report	Þorsteinsson 4'; Thompson 63'	Attendance: 741; Referee: Craig Hicks

7 November 2017	Charlton Athletic	0–1	Portsmouth	The Valley
19:45 GMT		Report	Main 19'	Attendance: 1,307; Referee: Nicholas Kinseley

29 November 2017	Crawley Town	1–3	Fulham U21	Broadfield Stadium
19:45 GMT	Meite 74'	Report	Adebayo 31'; Graham 45', 85'	Attendance: 435; Referee: John Busby

===== Group B =====
Pos	Lge	Team	Pld	W	PW	PL	L	GF	GA	GD	Pts	Qualification
1	L1	Gillingham (Q)	3	3	0	0	0	10	6	+4	9	Round 2
2	L1	Southend United (Q)	3	2	0	0	1	4	2	+2	6	Round 2
3	L2	Colchester United (E)	3	0	1	0	2	2	5	−3	2	
4	ACA	Reading U21 (E)	3	0	0	1	2	7	10	−3	1	

Updated to match(es) played on 7 November 2017. Source: EFL.com
(E) Eliminated; (Q) Qualified to the phase indicated

29 August 2017	Colchester United	2–2 (6–5 p)	Reading U21	Colchester Community Stadium
19:30 BST	Szmodics 5'; McKeown 87'; O'Sullivan (yellow card) 78'	Report	Andrésson (yellow card) 28'; Barrett 19'; Medford-Smith (yellow card) 40'; House 42' (yellow card) 52'	Attendance: 572; Referee: Gavin Ward
	Penalties
	Kinsella (penalty scored); James (penalty scored); Mandron (penalty scored); Dr.Wright (penalty scored); O'Sullivan (penalty scored); Jackson (penalty scored)		Andrésson (penalty scored); Smith (penalty scored); Holsgrove (penalty scored); Holmes (penalty scored); Barrett (penalty scored); Rollinson (penalty missed)

29 August 2017	Gillingham	2–1	Southend United	Priestfield Stadium
19:45 BST	Parker 8' (yellow card) 33'; Ferdinand 57' (o.g.); Ogilvie (yellow card) 63'; Wilkinson (yellow card) 90+12'	Report	McLaughlin 31'; White (yellow card) 55'; Ba (yellow card) 66'; McGlashan (yellow card) 73'; Oxley (yellow card) 90+12'	Attendance: 1,549; Referee: Andy Haines

3 October 2017	Colchester United	0–1	Gillingham	Colchester Community Stadium
19:45 BST	Kent (yellow card) 34'	Report	Hessenthaler (yellow card) 45+1'; Ehmer (yellow card) 58' (goal) 90+1'; Bingham (yellow card) 90+3'	Attendance: 684; Referee: John Brooks

3 October 2017	Southend United	1–0	Reading U21	Roots Hall
19:45 BST	Fortuné (yellow card) 23'; Robinson 31'	Report		Attendance: 1,148; Referee: Andy Haines

7 November 2017	Gillingham	7–5	Reading U21	Gillingham
19:45 GMT	Cundle 1'; Wilkinson 12'; Wagstaff 29' (yellow card) 53'; O'Neill 39'; Mbo (yellow card) 65' (goal) 80'; Oldaker 82', 90'	Report	Rollinson 38'; Popa 49', 83'; Holmes (yellow card) 52'; Medford-Smith 57'; Sheppard 68'	Stadium: Priestfield Stadium; Attendance: 1,039; Referee: Craig Hicks

7 November 2017	Southend United	2–0	Colchester United	Southend-on-Sea
19:45 GMT	Wright 37'; Robinson 49'; Cox (yellow card) 85'	Report	Kent (yellow card) 89'	Stadium: Roots Hall; Attendance: 2,781; Referee: Stuart Attwell

===== Group C =====
Pos	Lge	Team	Pld	W	PW	PL	L	GF	GA	GD	Pts	Qualification
1	L2	Swindon Town (Q)	3	2	0	0	1	7	5	+2	6	Round 2
2	ACA	West Ham United U21 (Q)	3	2	0	0	1	6	5	+1	6	Round 2
3	L1	Bristol Rovers (E)	3	1	0	0	2	8	8	0	3	
4	L2	Wycombe Wanderers (E)	3	1	0	0	2	3	6	−3	3	

Updated to match(es) played on 8 November 2017. Source: EFL.com
(E) Eliminated; (Q) Qualified to the phase indicated

15 August 2017	Swindon Town	2–3	West Ham United U21	County Ground
19:45 BST	Norris 47' (pen.); Mullin 74'; Dunne (yellow card) 85'; Brophy (yellow card) 86'	Report	Samuelsen 6'; Makasi 68'; Neufville (yellow card) 79' (yellow-red card) 90+3'; Kemp 86'	Attendance: 2,082; Referee: John Busby

29 August 2017	Wycombe Wanderers	1–5	Bristol Rovers	Adams Park
19:45 BST	Southwell 5'	Report	Telford 9', 42'; Broom 54', 85'; Sercombe 63'	Attendance: 1,132; Referee: James Linington

31 October 2017	Bristol Rovers	1–3	West Ham United U21	Memorial Stadium
19:45 BST	Nichols 1'; Burn (yellow card) 23'	Report	Martinez 43', 76'; Samuelsen 50'	Attendance: 1,508; Referee: Robert Jones

31 October 2017	Swindon Town	1–0	Wycombe Wanderers	County Ground
19:45 BST	Preston 88'; Smith (yellow card) 90+2'	Report	Cowan-Hall (yellow card) 67'; Bean (yellow card) 82'	Attendance: 1,236; Referee: Kevin Johnson

8 November 2017	Bristol Rovers	2–4	Swindon Town	Memorial Stadium
19:45 GMT	Sweeney 26'; Sercombe 73'	Report	Goddard 17' (pen.); Mullin 37'; Gordon 58'; McDermott (yellow card) 70'; Woolery 87'	Attendance: 1,657; Referee: Andre Marriner

28 November 2017	Wycombe Wanderers	2–0	West Ham United U21	Adams Park
19:45 GMT	de Havilland 31'; Scarr (yellow card) 40'; Jombati 55'	Report	Neufville (yellow card) 31'; Makasi (yellow card) 55'	Attendance: 699; Referee: Charles Breakspear

===== Group D =====
Pos	Lge	Team	Pld	W	PW	PL	L	GF	GA	GD	Pts	Qualification
1	L2	Yeovil Town (Q)	3	2	1	0	0	6	3	+3	8	Round 2
2	ACA	Chelsea U21 (Q)	3	1	0	2	0	6	4	+2	5	Round 2
3	L1	Plymouth Argyle (E)	3	0	2	0	1	5	6	−1	4	
4	L2	Exeter City (E)	3	0	0	1	2	4	8	−4	1	

Updated to match(es) played on 28 November 2017. Source: EFL.com
(E) Eliminated; (Q) Qualified to the phase indicated

15 August 2017	Plymouth Argyle	2–2 (5–4 p)	Chelsea U21	Home Park
19:00 BST	Lameiras (yellow card) 81'; Carey (yellow card) 85'; Fletcher 88', 90+1'	Report	Hudson-Odoi 62', 74'; Sterling (yellow card) 68'; Ampadu (yellow card) 90+4'	Attendance: 3,962; Referee: Brett Huxtable
	Penalties
	Carey (penalty scored); Fletcher (penalty scored); Ainsworth (penalty scored); Fox (penalty scored); Wylde (penalty scored)		McCormick (penalty scored); Muheim (penalty scored); Christie-Davies (penalty scored); Maddox (penalty missed); Sterling (penalty scored)

29 August 2017	Exeter City	1–3	Yeovil Town	St James Park
19:45 BST	Archibald-Henville (yellow card) 32'; Moore-Taylor (yellow card) 52'; Sparkes 80'; James (yellow card) 90+1'	Report	Green (yellow card) 5'; Surridge 46' (yellow card) 75'; Browne (yellow card) 52' (goal) 75'; Khan 78' (yellow card) 90+2'	Attendance: 1,530; Referee: Oliver Langford

3 October 2017	Plymouth Argyle	2–2 (5–3 p)	Exeter City	Home Park
19:45 BST	Edwards 19'; Ness (yellow card) 63'; Blissett 75'	Report	McAlinden 13'; Edwards 70'; Croll (yellow card) 83'	Attendance: 3,800; Referee: Chris Sarginson
	Penalties
	Wylde (penalty scored); Jervis (penalty scored); Sarcevic (penalty scored); Lameiras (penalty scored); Çiftçi (penalty scored)		James (penalty missed); Jay (penalty scored); Sweeney (penalty scored); Taylor (penalty scored)

25 October 2017	Yeovil Town	1–1 (5–3 p)	Chelsea U21	Huish Park
19:45 BST	Browne 22' (yellow card) 52'; Santos (yellow card) 42'		McCormick 34' (yellow card) 80'	Attendance: 1,896; Referee: Kevin Johnson
	Penalties
	Santos (penalty scored); Sturridge (penalty scored); Khan (penalty scored); Olomola (penalty scored); Zoko (penalty scored)		McCormick (penalty missed); Taylor-Crossdale (penalty scored); St Clair (penalty scored); Chalobah (penalty scored)

28 November 2017	Exeter City	1–3	Chelsea U21	St James Park
19:45 GMT	Reid 7'	Report	Hudson-Odoi 29'; James 68'; Grant 83'	Attendance: 1,294; Referee: Kevin Johnson

28 November 2017	Yeovil Town	2–1	Plymouth Argyle	Huish Park
19:45 GMT	James 61'; Surridge 88'	Report	Taylor 16'; Bradley (yellow card) 48'; Songo'o (yellow card) 83'; Threlkeld (yellow card) 87'	Attendance: 1,110; Referee: Brett Huxtable

===== Group E =====
Pos	Lge	Team	Pld	W	PW	PL	L	GF	GA	GD	Pts	Qualification
1	ACA	Swansea City U21 (Q)	3	3	0	0	0	6	2	+4	9	Round 2
2	L2	Forest Green Rovers (Q)	3	2	0	0	1	4	3	+1	6	Round 2
3	L2	Cheltenham Town (E)	3	1	0	0	2	4	5	−1	3	
4	L2	Newport County (E)	3	0	0	0	3	2	6	−4	0	

Updated to match(es) played on 7 November 2017. Source: EFL.com
(E) Eliminated; (Q) Qualified to the phase indicated

15 August 2017	Cheltenham Town	1–2	Swansea City U21	Whaddon Road
19:45 BST	Graham (yellow card) 42'; Storer 48'; Cranston (yellow card) 90+2'	Report	Marić (yellow card) 42'; Rodon (yellow card) 69'; Baker-Richardson (yellow card) 72'; Gorrré 73'; Lewis 83'	Attendance: 801; Referee: Kevin Johnson

29 August 2017	Forest Green Rovers	2–0	Newport County	The New Lawn
19:30 BST	Wishart 20'; Noble (yellow card) 60'; James 84'	Report	Willmott (yellow card) 45'; Owen-Evans (yellow card) 67'	Attendance: 1,090; Referee: Brett Huxtable

3 October 2017	Cheltenham Town	1–2	Forest Green Rovers	Whaddon Road
19:45 BST	Bower (yellow card) 34'; Davey (yellow card) 39'; Hinds 50'; Cranston (yellow card) 70'; Wright (red card) 83'	Report	Brown 79' (yellow card) 90+2'; Stevens 80'	Attendance: 1,576; Referee: Trevor Kettle

10 October 2017	Newport County	1–2	Swansea City U21	Rodney Parade
19:30 BST	Owen-Evans (yellow card) 33'; McCoulsky 76'	Report	Byers (yellow card) 32'; Gorré 70'; Lewis (yellow card) 72'; Foulston 83' (o.g.)	Attendance: 750; Referee: Brett Huxtable

31 October 2017	Forest Green Rovers	0–2	Swansea City U21	The New Lawn
19:45 GMT		Report	Blair (yellow card) 11'; King 75'; Gorré 79'	Attendance: 590; Referee: Graham Horwood

7 November 2017	Newport County	1–2	Cheltenham Town	Rodney Parade
19:30 GMT	Reynolds 48'	Report	Graham 3'; Pell 11'	Attendance: 540; Referee: Simon Hooper

===== Group F =====
Pos	Lge	Team	Pld	W	PW	PL	L	GF	GA	GD	Pts	Qualification
1	L2	Luton Town (Q)	3	1	2	0	0	5	4	+1	7	Round 2
2	L1	AFC Wimbledon (Q)	3	2	0	0	1	9	8	+1	6	Round 2
3	L2	Barnet (E)	3	1	0	1	1	6	6	0	4	
4	ACA	Tottenham Hotspur U21 (E)	3	0	0	1	2	6	8	−2	1	

Updated to match(es) played on 3 October 2017. Source: EFL.com
(E) Eliminated; (Q) Qualified to the phase indicated

15 August 2017	Luton Town	2–2 (4–2 p)	Tottenham Hotspur U21	Kenilworth Road
19:45 BST	Gambin 19'; McQuoid 51'; Cook (yellow card) 90+3'	Report	Shea 21' (o.g.); Loft 47'	Attendance: 2,699; Referee: Craig Hicks
	Penalties
	Lee (penalty scored); Cook (penalty scored); McQuoid (penalty scored); Gambin (penalty scored)		Shashoua (penalty missed); Maghoma (penalty scored); Sterling (penalty scored); Bennetts (penalty missed)

29 August 2017	Barnet	3–4	AFC Wimbledon	The Hive Stadium
20:00 BST	Bover 13'; Coulthirst 25'; Blackman 89'	Report	Hartigan 5'; Kaja 16'; McDonald 48'; Clough 56' (o.g.)	Attendance: 696; Referee: Dean Whitestone

3 October 2017	AFC Wimbledon	4–3	Tottenham Hotspur U21	Kingsmeadow
19:45 BST	Sibbick 19', 60'; Kaja 38'; Parrett 90+2'	Report	Tracey 16'; Shashoua 34'; Sterling 59'	Attendance: 608; Referee: Antony Coggins

3 October 2017	Luton Town	1–1 (4–3 p)	Barnet	Kenilworth Road
19:45 BST	Cook (yellow card) 57'; Shea (yellow card) 62'; Lee 64'	Report	Bover (yellow card) 32'; Tutonda (yellow card) 54'; Taylor 63' (pen.)	Attendance: 1,530; Referee: John Busby
	Penalties
	Lee (penalty scored); Berry (penalty missed); Cook (penalty scored); Justin (penalty scored); Ruddock Mpanzu (penalty scored)		Taylor (penalty scored); Tutonda (penalty missed); Fonguck (penalty scored); Shomotun (penalty scored); Santos (penalty missed)

31 October 2017	AFC Wimbledon	1–2	Luton Town	Kingsmeadow
19:45 GMT	Taylor 14'; Meades (yellow card) 62'	Report	Shinnie 12', 72'; D'ath (yellow card) 60'	Attendance: 581; Referee: Gavin Ward

28 November 2017	Barnet	2–1	Tottenham Hotspur U21	The Hive Stadium
20:00 GMT	Maghoma (o.g.); Nicholls 57'	Report	Harrison 16'	Attendance: 445; Referee: Lee Collins

===== Group G =====
Pos	Lge	Team	Pld	W	PW	PL	L	GF	GA	GD	Pts	Qualification
1	L1	Milton Keynes Dons (Q)	3	2	1	0	0	6	3	+3	8	Round 2
2	L1	Oxford United (Q)	3	1	0	1	1	11	8	+3	4	Round 2
3	L2	Stevenage (E)	3	1	0	1	1	5	7	−2	4	
4	ACA	Brighton & Hove Albion U21 (E)	3	0	1	0	2	3	7	−4	2	

Updated to match(es) played on 7 November 2017. Source: EFL.com
(E) Eliminated; (Q) Qualified to the phase indicated

29 August 2017	Milton Keynes Dons	2–0	Brighton & Hove Albion U21	Stadium mk
19:45 BST	McGrandles (yellow card) 31'; Ariyibi 32'; Nombe (yellow card) 40'; Tshibola 66' (pen.)	Report	Mandroiu (yellow card) 89'	Attendance: 1,541; Referee: Craig Hicks

29 August 2017	Stevenage	2–6	Oxford United	Broadhall Way
19:45 BST	Beautyman 18'; Conlon (yellow card) 49'; Samuel 82'	Report	Henry 30'; Hall 43', 52'; Obika 50'; Xemi (yellow card) 53'; Rothwell 55'; Payne 64'	Attendance: 799; Referee: Charles Breakspear

3 October 2017	Milton Keynes Dons	0–0 (5–4 p)	Stevenage	Stadium mk
19:45 BST	McGrandles (yellow card) 82'; Nombe (yellow card) 86'	Report	Toner (yellow card) 68'	Attendance: 2,031; Referee: Nick Kinseley
	Penalties
	Nesbitt (penalty scored); Seager (penalty scored); McGrandles (penalty scored); Nombe (penalty scored); Thomas-Asante (penalty scored)		Conlon (penalty scored); Whelpdale (penalty missed); Pett (penalty scored); Wilkinson (penalty scored); Newton (penalty scored)

3 October 2017	Oxford United	2–2 (4–5 p)	Brighton & Hove Albion U21	Kassam Stadium
19:45 BST	van Kessel 22', 28'	Report	Tilley 36'; Mandroiu 67'	Attendance: 1,074; Referee: Dean Whitestone
	Penalties
	Roberts (penalty scored); Rothwell (penalty missed); Henry (penalty scored); Ruffels (penalty scored); Ashby (penalty scored)		Cox (penalty scored); Tilley (penalty scored); Sanders (penalty scored); Mandroiu (penalty scored); Alzate (penalty scored)

7 November 2017	Oxford United	3–4	Milton Keynes Dons	Kassam Stadium
19:45 GMT	Payne 33', 39' (pen.); Xemi (yellow card) 64'; Hall 64'	Report	Thomas-Asante 10' (yellow card) 67'; Upson (yellow card) 34'; Lewington (yellow card) 38'; Ariyibi 40', 45'; Seager 66'; Wootton (yellow card) 71'; Agard (yellow card) 88'	Attendance: 1,182; Referee: Chris Sarginson

7 November 2017	Stevenage	3–1	Brighton & Hove Albion U21	Broadhall Way
19:45 GMT	Samuel 19', 82'; Wootton 45+2' (pen.)	Report	Rosenior (yellow card) 45+1'; Murphy 90'	Attendance: 389; Referee: Charles Breakspear

===== Group H =====
Pos	Lge	Team	Pld	W	PW	PL	L	GF	GA	GD	Pts	Qualification
1	L1	Peterborough United (Q)	3	2	0	1	0	5	1	+4	7	Round 2
2	L1	Northampton Town (Q)	3	0	3	0	0	5	5	0	6	Round 2
3	ACA	Southampton U21 (E)	3	1	0	1	1	4	5	−1	4	
4	L2	Cambridge United (E)	3	0	0	1	2	1	4	−3	1	

Updated to match(es) played on 7 November 2017. Source: EFL.com
(E) Eliminated; (Q) Qualified to the phase indicated

29 August 2017	Northampton Town	1–1 (5–4 p)	Cambridge United	Sixfields Stadium
19:45 BST	Waters (yellow card) 16'; Revell 29'	Report	Mingoia 27'; Legge (yellow card) 84'	Attendance: 1,453; Referee: John Brooks
	Penalties
	Revell (penalty scored); Iaciofano (penalty scored); Waters (penalty scored); McWilliams (penalty scored); Taylor (penalty scored)		Elito (penalty scored); Mingoia (penalty scored); Brown (penalty scored); O'Neil (penalty missed); Azeez (penalty scored)

29 August 2017	Peterborough United	2–0	Southampton U21	London Road Stadium
19:45 BST	Morias 2'; Maddison 21' (pen.); Forrester (yellow card) 86'	Report		Attendance: 2,282; Referee: Trevor Kettle

3 October 2017	Cambridge United	0–1	Southampton U21	Abbey Stadium
19:00 BST	Carroll (yellow card) 34'	Report	Jones 36'	Attendance: 480; Referee: Charles Breakspear

3 October 2017	Peterborough United	1–1 (2–4 p)	Northampton Town	London Road Stadium
19:45 BST	Grant (yellow card) 17'; Miller (yellow card) 41'; Lloyd 43'	Report	Waters (yellow card) 51'; Baldwin 79' (o.g.); Grimes (yellow card) 90+4'	Attendance: 2,745; Referee: Gavin Ward
	Penalties
	Marriott (penalty missed); Doughty (penalty scored); Da Silva Lopes (penalty scored); Hughes (penalty missed)		Grimes (penalty scored); Revell (penalty scored); Richards (penalty scored); Waters (penalty scored)

7 November 2017	Cambridge United	0–2	Peterborough United	Abbey Stadium
19:45 GMT	Lewis (yellow card) 55'	Report	Taylor 50'; Edwards (yellow card) 64'; Marriott 81'	Attendance: 3,138; Referee: Gavin Ward

7 November 2017	Northampton Town	3–3 (4–2 p)	Southampton U21	Sixfields Stadium
19:45 GMT	Foley 72'; Grimes (yellow card) 75'; McGugan 83'; Taylor 90+6'	Report	Hesketh 6', 51' (yellow card) 64'; Johnson 59'	Attendance: 1,118; Referee: Brett Huxtable
	Penalties
	Grimes (penalty scored); Richards (penalty scored); Long (penalty scored); McGivern (penalty missed); McGugan (penalty scored)		Little (penalty scored); Johnson (penalty missed); Afolabi (penalty scored); Cook (penalty missed)

=== Knockout stage ===
If scores are level after 90 minutes in Rounds 2, 3 and 4, the game will be determined by the taking of penalties.

=== Round 2 ===
The Round 2 draw was made on 10 November 2017. The 32 remaining teams were drawn into 16 ties; each group winner will be at home to a runner-up from a different group within their own region.

==== Northern Section ====
28 November 2017	Rochdale	1–1 (5–4 p)	Doncaster Rovers	Rochdale
19:30 GMT	Gillam 33' (pen.)	Report	Mandeville 72'	Stadium: Spotland Stadium; Attendance: 786; Referee: Darren Handley
	Penalties
	Andrew (penalty scored); McGahey (penalty scored); Bunney (penalty scored); Inman (penalty scored); Kitching (penalty scored)		Mason (penalty scored); Mandeville (penalty scored); Ben Khémis (penalty scored); Alcock (penalty scored); Rowe (penalty missed)

2 December 2017	Walsall	1–2	Bury	Walsall
12:30 GMT	Oztumer 45+1'	Report	Ajose 7', 65'	Stadium: Bescot Stadium; Attendance: 1,065; Referee: Michael Salisbury

5 December 2017	Bradford City	0–1	Oldham Athletic	Bradford
19:45 GMT		Report	Obadeyi 3'	Stadium: Valley Parade; Attendance: 1,036; Referee: David Webb

5 December 2017	Fleetwood Town	2–0	Chesterfield	Fleetwood
19:45 GMT	Sowerby 17'; Reid 88'	Report		Stadium: Highbury Stadium; Attendance: 372; Referee: Ross Joyce

5 December 2017	Lincoln City	3–2	Accrington Stanley	Lincoln
19:45 GMT	Palmer 37'; Green 45+1'; Raggett 61'	Report	Wilks 7'; Paul Farman 42' (o.g.)	Stadium: Sincil Bank; Attendance: 3,026; Referee: Christopher Sarginson

5 December 2017	Port Vale	1–2	Shrewsbury Town	Stoke-on-Trent
19:45 GMT	Montaño 1'	Report	Dodds 68'; Whalley 81'	Stadium: Vale Park; Attendance: 965; Referee: Graham Salisbury

5 December 2017	Scunthorpe United	1–2	Leicester City U21	Scunthorpe
19:45 GMT	van Veen 45+1'	Report	Thomas 3'; Hughes 12'	Stadium: Glanford Park; Attendance: 824; Referee: Trevor Kettle

6 December 2017	Blackpool	1–1 (5–4 p)	Mansfield Town	Blackpool
19:00 GMT	Mellor 38'	Report	Butcher 88'	Stadium: Bloomfield Road; Attendance: 587; Referee: Seb Stockbridge
	Penalties
	Philliskirk (penalty scored); Cooke (penalty scored); Taylor (penalty missed); Mellor (penalty scored); Delfouneso (penalty scored); Quigley (penalty scored)		Digby (penalty scored); Benning (penalty scored); Sterling-James (penalty scored); Potter (penalty missed); Spencer (penalty scored); Thomas (penalty missed)

==== Southern Section ====
2 December 2017	Portsmouth	2–0	Northampton Town	Portsmouth
12:30 GMT	Evans 41'; O'Keefe 58'	Report		Stadium: Fratton Park; Attendance: 1,780; Referee: Tom Nield

5 December 2017	Gillingham	1–2	Oxford United	Gillingham
19:00 GMT	Byrne 9' (pen.)	Report	Payne 31'; Mowatt 90+2'	Stadium: Priestfield Stadium; Attendance: 1,224; Referee: Charles Breakspear

5 December 2017	Luton Town	4–0	West Ham United U21	Luton
19:45 GMT	D'Ath 28'; Jarvis 56'; Cotter 86'; Cook 90+1'	Report		Stadium: Kenilworth Road; Attendance: 1,670; Referee: Darren Drysdale

5 December 2017	Swansea City U21	2–3	Charlton Athletic	Swansea
19:00 GMT	Gorré 9'; Garrick 41'	Report	Hackett-Fairchild 15', 52'; Ahearne-Grant 32'	Stadium: Liberty Stadium; Attendance: 410; Referee: Lee Swabey

5 December 2017	Swindon Town	0–1	Forest Green Rovers	Swindon
19:30 GMT	Anderson (yellow card) 90+5' (yellow-red card)	Report	Doidge 79'; Bennett (yellow card) 90+6' (yellow-red card)	Stadium: County Ground; Attendance: 1,320; Referee: Rob Lewis

5 December 2017	Yeovil Town	2–0	AFC Wimbledon	Yeovil
19:45 GMT	Davies 49'; Gray 87'	Report		Stadium: Huish Park; Attendance: 886; Referee: Anthony Coggins

6 December 2017	Milton Keynes Dons	0–4	Chelsea U21	Milton Keynes
19:45 GMT		Report	Batshuayi 22', 42'; Hudson-Odoi 45'; Musonda 56'	Stadium: stadium:MK; Attendance: 1,549; Referee: Gavin Ward

6 December 2017	Peterborough United	2–0	Southend United	Peterborough
19:45 GMT	Edwards 16'; Maddison 62'	Report		Stadium: London Road Stadium; Attendance: 1,707; Referee: John Busby

=== Round 3 ===
The Round 3 draw was made on 8 December 2017.

==== Northern Section ====
9 January 2018	Bury	2–3	Fleetwood Town	Bury
19:30 GMT	Bunn 45+4'; Wai-tsun 55'	Report	Hiwula 14' 50'; Grant 17' (pen.)	Stadium: Gigg Lane; Attendance: 698; Referee: Seb Stockbridge

9 January 2018	Rochdale	0–1	Lincoln City	Rochdale
19:45 GMT		Report	Palmer 88'	Stadium: Spotland; Attendance: 1,171; Referee: Ben Toner

10 January 2018	Shrewsbury Town	0–0 (4–2 p)	Blackpool	Shrewsbury
19:00 GMT		Report		Stadium: New Meadow; Attendance: 1,362; Referee: Chris Sarginson
	Penalties
	Payne (penalty scored); Morris (penalty scored); Riley (penalty scored); John-Lewis (penalty scored)		Philliskirk (penalty missed); Cooke (penalty scored); Roache (penalty missed); Delfouneso (penalty scored)

17 January 2018	Oldham Athletic	4–2	Leicester City U21	Oldham
19:30 GMT	Davies 50' 56'; Gerrard 76'; Obadeyi 86'	Report	Knight 43'; Musa 68'	Stadium: Boundary Park; Attendance: 4,192; Referee: Darren Handley

==== Southern Section ====
9 January 2018	Yeovil Town	2–0	Forest Green Rovers	Yeovil
19:45 GMT	N. Smith 3'; C. Smith 26'	Report		Stadium: Huish Park; Attendance: 1,395; Referee: John Busby

9 January 2018	Portsmouth	1–2	Chelsea U21	Portsmouth
19:45 GMT	Pitman 90+3'		Musonda 59', 90+5'	Stadium: Fratton Park; Attendance: 3,116; Referee: Gavin Ward

9 January 2018	Charlton Athletic	1–1 (0–3 p)	Oxford United	Charlton, London
19:45 GMT	Ahearne-Grant 7'	Report	Thomas 54'	Stadium: The Valley; Attendance: 1,146; Referee: Andy Haines
	Penalties
	Jackson (penalty missed); Mavididi (penalty missed); Hackett-Fairchild (penalty missed)		Mowatt (penalty scored); Obika (penalty scored); Ledson (penalty missed); Mehmeti (penalty scored)

9 January 2018	Luton Town	0–0 (6–7 p)	Peterborough United	Luton
19:45 GMT		Report		Stadium: Kenilworth Road; Attendance: 2,253; Referee: Antony Coggins
	Penalties
	Cook (penalty scored); McQuoid (penalty scored); Lee (penalty scored); Shinnie (penalty scored); Sheehan (penalty scored); Mpanzu (penalty scored); Musonda (penalty missed)		Maddison (penalty scored); Doughty (penalty scored); Marriott (penalty scored); Shephard (penalty scored); Kanu (penalty scored); Baldwin (penalty scored); Tafazolli (penalty scored)

=== Round 4 ===
Eight teams participated in this round with ties originally scheduled to take place in the week commencing 22 January 2018.

23 January 2018	Lincoln City	4–2	Peterborough United	Lincoln
19:45 GMT	Rowe 43'; Rhead 55'; Anderson 90+1'; Green 90+4'	Report	Eardley 14' (o.g.); Lloyd 50'	Stadium: Sincil Bank; Attendance: 6,663; Referee: Michael Salisbury

23 January 2018	Shrewsbury Town	2–1	Oldham Athletic	Shrewsbury
19:00 GMT	Payne 1'; Rodman 88'	Report	Amadi-Holloway 67'; Gardner (yellow card) 82'	Stadium: New Meadow; Attendance: 1,984; Referee: Darren Handley

23 January 2018	Chelsea U21	3–0	Oxford United	Fulham, London
19:30 GMT	St Clair 10'; Redan 16'; Castilo 65'; Sammut (yellow card) 90+1'	Report	Ricardinho (yellow card) 4'; Ledson (yellow card) 9'; Raglan (yellow card) 37'	Stadium: Stamford Bridge; Attendance: 2,643; Referee: John Brooks

6 February 2018	Yeovil Town	3–2	Fleetwood Town	Yeovil
19:45 GMT	Bolger 23' (o.g.); Whelan 56'; Zoko 90+1'	Report	Bolger 17'; McAleny (yellow card) 30'; Sowerby (yellow card) 45'; Schwabl (yellow card) 55'; Hiwula 80'	Stadium: Huish Park; Attendance: 1,314; Referee: Gavin Ward

=== Semi-finals ===
Four teams participated in this round, which consisted of single ties played at the stadium of the club drawn first in each tie.

6 February 2018	Lincoln City	1–1 (4–2 p)	Chelsea U21	Lincoln
19:45 GMT	Waterfall 72'	Report	Chalobah (yellow card) 27'; Redan 78'	Stadium: Sincil Bank; Attendance: 9,444; Referee: David Webb
	Penalties
	Habergham (penalty missed); Whitehouse (penalty scored); Palmer (penalty scored); Green (penalty scored); Frecklington (penalty scored)		Hazard (penalty scored); Ampadu (penalty missed); Maddox (penalty missed); St Clair (penalty scored)

6 March 2018	Shrewsbury Town	1–0	Yeovil Town	Shrewsbury
19:45 GMT	Morris 63'; Whalley (yellow card) 87'	Report	Khan (yellow card) 57'	Stadium: New Meadow; Attendance: 4,118; Referee: Darren Drysdale

=== Final ===
8 April 2018
15:00 BST

Lincoln City	1–0	Shrewsbury Town
Whitehouse 16'	Report

Wembley Stadium, London
Attendance: 41,261
Referee: Gavin Ward

== Match proceeds ==
After deduction of match expenses, all proceeds were split:

- 45% Home club
- 45% Away club
- 10% to the pool account

== Top goalscorers ==
Rank	Player	Club	Goals
1	(England) Callum Hudson-Odoi	Chelsea U21	4
1	(Netherlands) Kenji Gorré	Swansea City U21	4
1	(England) Jack Payne	Bradford City	4
4	(England) Luke Armstrong	Middlesbrough U21	3
4	(United States) Gboly Ariyibi	Northampton Town	3
4	(Wales) Wes Burns	Fleetwood Town	3
4	(Republic of Ireland) Jack Byrne	Oldham Athletic	3
4	(England) Matt Green	Lincoln City	3
4	(England) Robert Hall	Oxford United	3
4	(England) Jordi Hiwula	Fleetwood Town	3
4	(England) Alex Jones	Bradford City	3
4	(Belgium) Charly Musonda	Chelsea U21	3
4	(England) Ollie Palmer	Lincoln City	3
4	(England) Danny Philliskirk	Blackpool	3
4	(Wales) Alex Samuel	Stevenage	3
4	(Portugal) Erico Sousa	Accrington Stanley	3
4	(England) Sam Surridge	Yeovil Town	3
