= Rodon =

Rodon or Rodón may refer to:

== People ==
- Carlos Rodón (born 1992), American professional baseball pitcher
- Chris Rodon, Welsh former professional footballer
- Dolors Vives Rodon (1909–2007), Spanish aviator
- Francisco Rodón (born 1934), Puerto Rican painter
- Joe Rodon (born 1997), Welsh professional footballer
- Miriam Rodón Naveira (born 1963), Puerto Rican environmental scientist
- Montserrat Cervera Rodon (born 1949), Catalan anti-militarist, feminist, and women's health activist
- Peter Rodon (died 2000), Welsh professional footballer
- Ramón Balcells Rodón (1919–1999), Spanish sailor

== Places ==
- Cape of Rodon, in Albania
- Castle of Rodon, in Albania
- Rodon, old name of Jämtland, Sweden
- Rodon (Athens), former music venue in Athens, Greece

== See also ==
- Radon
- Rodan
- Rodin (surname)
- Rondon (disambiguation)
