= 2017–18 Doncaster Rovers F.C. season =

Doncaster Rovers
2017–18 season
- Chairman: David Blunt
- Manager: Darren Ferguson
- Stadium: Keepmoat Stadium
- League One: 15th
- FA Cup: Third round (vs. Rochdale)
- EFL Cup: Third round (vs. Arsenal)
- EFL Trophy: Second round (vs. Rochdale)
- Top goalscorer: League: John Marquis (14); All: John Marquis (15)
- Highest home attendance: 12,481 vs Rotherham United (League One, 11 November '17)
- Lowest home attendance: 1,520 vs Sunderland (EFL Trophy, 3 October '17)
- Average home league attendance: 8,212
Home colours	Away colours

The 2017–18 season was Doncaster Rovers's 139th season in their existence, 15th consecutive season in the Football League and first back in League One following promotion last season. Along with League One, the club also participated in the FA Cup, EFL Cup and EFL Trophy.

The season covered the period from 1 July 2017 to 30 June 2018.

== Squad ==
=== Detailed overview ===
League caps and goals up to the start of season 2017–18.
Players with name and squad number struck through and marked † left the club during the playing season.

No.	Name	Position (s)	Nationality	Place of Birth	Date of Birth (Age)	Club caps	Club goals	Int. caps	Int. goals	Signed from
Goalkeepers
1	Ian Lawlor	GK	(Republic of Ireland)	Dublin	27 October 1994 (age 31)	19	0	–	–	Manchester City
13	Marko Maroši	GK	(Slovakia)	Michalovce	23 October 1993 (age 32)	29	0	–	–	Wigan Athletic
33	Louis Jones	GK	(England)		12 October 1998 (age 27)	–	–	–	–	Academy
—	~~Ross Etheridge~~ †	GK	(England)	Chesterfield	14 September 1994 (age 31)	6	0	–	–	Accrington Stanley
Defenders
2	Craig Alcock	RB/LB/CB	(England)	Truro	8 December 1987 (age 38)	54	0	–	–	Sheffield United
3	Danny Andrew	LB	(England)	Holbeach	23 December 1990 (age 35)	–	–	–	–	Grimsby Town
5	Mathieu Baudry	CB/DM	(France)	Le Havre	24 February 1988 (age 38)	31	5	–	–	Leyton Orient
6	Andy Butler	CB	(England)	Doncaster	4 November 1983 (age 42)	117	10	–	–	Sheffield United
8	Niall Mason	RB	(England)	Bromley	1 January 1997 (age 29)	38	0	–	–	Aston Villa
15	Joe Wright	CB	(Wales)	Monk Fryston, England	26 February 1995 (age 31)	22	0	–	–	Huddersfield Town
20	Tyler Garratt	LB/CB	(England)	Lincoln	26 October 1996 (age 29)	2	0	–	–	Bolton Wanderers
25	Mitchell Lund	RB	(England)	Leeds	27 August 1996 (age 29)	40	1	–	–	Academy
29	Reece Fielding	CB	(England)	Doncaster	23 October 1998 (age 27)	–	–	–	–	Academy
32	Cody Prior	LB	(England)			–	–	–	–	Academy
—	Danny Amos	LB	(Northern Ireland)	Sheffield	20 May 1999 (age 27)	–	–	–	–	Academy
—	Cedric Evina	LB/LM	(France)	Cameroon	16 November 1991 (age 34)	77	1	–	–	Charlton Athletic
Midfielders
4	Luke McCullough	CB/RB/DM	(Northern Ireland)	Portadown	15 February 1994 (age 32)	86	1	5	0	Manchester United
10	Tommy Rowe	LM/LB/CM	(England)	Wythenshawe	1 May 1989 (age 37)	56	16	–	–	Wolverhampton Wanderers
17	Matty Blair	CM/RW/LW	(England)	Warwick	21 June 1989 (age 36)	45	3	–	–	Mansfield Town
22	Alfie Beestin	AM	(England)	Leeds	1 October 1997 (age 28)	3	0	–	–	Tadcaster Albion
~~24~~	~~Harry Middleton~~ †	CM/AM	(England)	Doncaster	12 April 1995 (age 31)	63	0	–	–	Academy
26	James Coppinger	RM/CM/RB	(England)	Guisborough	18 January 1981 (age 45)	472	53	–	–	Exeter City
27	Issam Ben Khémis	DM	(Tunisia)	Paris	10 January 1996 (age 30)	–	–	1	0	FC Lorient
30	Jacob Fletcher	CM	(England)		23 May 1999 (age 18)	–	–	–	–	Academy
—	~~Tony Donaldson~~ †	CM	(England)		Age 19	–	–	–	–	Runcorn Linnets
Forwards
9	John Marquis	CF/LW	(England)	Lewisham	16 May 1992 (age 34)	45	26	–	–	Millwall
11	Andy Williams	CF	(England)	Hereford	14 August 1986 (age 39)	83	23	–	–	Swindon Town
14	Liam Mandeville	CF	(England)	Lincoln	17 February 1997 (age 29)	32	8	–	–	Academy
19	Alfie May	CF	(England)	Leeds	2 July 1993 (age 32)	16	3	–	–	Hythe Town
21	Will Longbottom	CF	(England)	Leeds	12 December 1995 (age 30)	4	0	–	–	Academy
23	Alex Kiwomya	CF	(England)	Sheffield	20 May 1996 (age 30)	–	–	–	–	Chelsea

=== Statistics ===
This includes any players featured in a match day squad in any competition.

As of 5 May 2018

No.	Pos	Nat	Player	Total		League One		FA Cup		League Cup		League Trophy	
No.	Pos	Nat	Player	Apps	Goals	Apps	Goals	Apps	Goals	Apps	Goals	Apps	Goals
1	GK	(Republic of Ireland) IRL	Ian Lawlor	39	0	34	0	3	0	2	0	0	0
2	DF	(England) ENG	Craig Alcock	17	0	6+3	0	1	0	1+2	0	4	0
3	DF	(England) ENG	Danny Andrew	6	0	4	0	0	0	2	0	0	0
4	DF	(Northern Ireland) NIR	Luke McCullough	13	0	10+3	0	0	0	0	0	0	0
5	DF	(France) FRA	Mathieu Baudry	26	1	19+3	1	2	0	0	0	2	0
6	DF	(England) ENG	Andy Butler	43	4	34+2	4	3	0	2	0	1+1	0
7	MF	(Netherlands) NED	Rodney Kongolo (on loan from Manchester City)	42	1	17+18	0	2+1	0	3	1	1	0
8	MF	(England) ENG	Niall Mason	50	3	37+3	3	2+1	0	2+1	0	3+1	0
9	FW	(England) ENG	John Marquis	51	15	45	14	3	1	2+1	0	0	0
10	MF	(England) ENG	Tommy Rowe	47	9	40	4	3	4	3	1	0+1	0
11	FW	(England) ENG	Andy Williams	13	1	3+6	0	0	0	0+1	0	3	1
12	MF	(England) ENG	Ben Whiteman	47	7	34+8	6	1	0	3	1	1	0
13	GK	(Slovakia) SVK	Marko Maroši	18	0	12+1	0	0	0	1	0	4	0
14	FW	(England) ENG	Liam Mandeville	24	4	7+10	1	0+2	1	0+1	0	4	2
15	DF	(Wales) WAL	Joe Wright	38	0	32+1	0	1	0	3	0	1	0
16	MF	(England) ENG	Jordan Houghton (on loan from Chelsea)	40	1	33+4	0	2	1	1	0	0	0
17	MF	(England) ENG	Matty Blair	46	2	32+8	2	3	0	2	0	1	0
18	DF	(England) ENG	Tom Anderson	7	2	7	2	0	0	0	0	0	0
19	FW	(England) ENG	Alfie May	31	6	13+14	4	1	0	3	2	0	0
20	DF	(England) ENG	Tyler Garratt	21	0	10+3	0	1+1	0	1+1	0	4	0
21	FW	(England) ENG	Will Longbottom	1	0	0	0	0	0	0	0	0+1	0
22	MF	(England) ENG	Alfie Beestin	33	2	17+9	2	2+1	0	0+1	0	3	0
23	FW	(England) ENG	Alex Kiwomya	12	1	5+7	1	0	0	0	0	0	0
24	DF	(Republic of Ireland) IRL	Andy Boyle	6	1	6	1	0	0	0	0	0	0
26	MF	(England) ENG	James Coppinger	42	5	34+4	3	2+1	2	1	0	0	0
27	MF	(Tunisia) TUN	Issam Ben Khémis	9	2	2+1	1	0+1	0	1	0	4	1
29	DF	(England) ENG	Reece Fielding	1	0	0	0	0	0	0	0	1	0
30	MF	(England) ENG	Jacob Fletcher	3	0	0+1	0	0	0	0	0	1+1	0
31	MF	(England) ENG	Tyler Walker	1	0	0	0	0	0	0	0	1	0
32	DF	(Republic of Ireland) IRL	Cody Prior	2	0	0	0	0	0	0	0	0+2	0
33	GK	(England) ENG	Louis Jones	0	0	0	0	0	0	0	0	0	0
34	FW	(England) ENG	Louis Scattergood	1	0	0	0	0	0	0	0	0+1	0
35	DF	(England) ENG	Keegan Townrow	0	0	0	0	0	0	0	0	0	0
36	GK	(England) ENG	Declan Ogley	0	0	0	0	0	0	0	0	0	0
37	MF	(England) ENG	Morgan James	2	0	0	0	0	0	0	0	1+1	0
38	FW	(England) ENG	James Morris	1	0	0	0	0	0	0	0	0+1	0
39	DF	(Northern Ireland) NIR	Danny Amos	4	0	2+1	0	0	0	0	0	1	0
40	DF	(England) ENG	Branden Horton	0	0	0	0	0	0	0	0	0	0
Players who left the club during the season:
18	DF	(England) ENG	Harry Toffolo (on loan from Norwich City)	17	0	11+2	0	1+1	0	0	0	2	0
24	MF	(England) ENG	Harry Middleton	1	0	0	0	0	0	0	0	1	0

==== Goals record ====
As of 5 May 2018.

Rank	No.	Po.	Name	League One	FA Cup	League Cup	League Trophy	Total
1	9	FW	John Marquis	14	1	0	0	15
2	10	MF	Tommy Rowe	4	4	1	0	9
3	12	MF	Ben Whiteman	6	0	1	0	7
4	19	FW	Alfie May	4	0	2	0	6
5	26	MF	James Coppinger	3	2	0	0	5
6	6	DF	Andy Butler	4	0	0	0	4
6	14	FW	Liam Mandeville	1	1	0	2	4
8	8	MF	Niall Mason	3	0	0	0	3
9	22	MF	Alfie Beestin	2	0	0	0	2
9	17	MF	Matty Blair	2	0	0	0	2
9	18	DF	Tom Anderson	2	0	0	0	2
9	27	MF	Issam Ben Khémis	1	0	0	1	2
13	5	DF	Mathieu Baudry	1	0	0	0	1
13	23	FW	Alex Kiwomya	1	0	0	0	1
13	24	DF	Andy Boyle	1	0	0	0	1
13	16	MF	Jordan Houghton	0	1	0	0	1
13	7	MF	Rodney Kongolo	0	0	1	0	1
13	11	FW	Andy Williams	0	0	0	1	1
-			Own goal	3	0	0	0	3
Total				52	9	5	4	70

==== Disciplinary record ====
As of 5 May 2018.

No.	Pos.	Name	League One			FA Cup			League Cup			League Trophy			Total		
No.	Pos.	Name	Booked	(yellow card) (yellow-red card)	Sent off (straight red)	Booked	(yellow card) (yellow-red card)	Sent off (straight red)	Booked	(yellow card) (yellow-red card)	Sent off (straight red)	Booked	(yellow card) (yellow-red card)	Sent off (straight red)	Booked	(yellow card) (yellow-red card)	Sent off (straight red)
1	GK	Ian Lawlor	2	0	0	1	0	0	0	0	0	0	0	0	3	0	0
4	DF	Luke McCullough	2	0	0	0	0	0	0	0	0	0	0	0	2	0	0
5	DF	Mathieu Baudry	4	0	0	0	0	0	0	0	0	0	0	0	4	0	0
6	DF	Andy Butler	3	0	0	0	0	0	0	0	0	0	0	0	3	0	0
7	MF	Rodney Kongolo	0	0	0	1	0	0	0	0	0	0	0	0	1	0	0
8	MF	Niall Mason	5	0	0	0	0	0	1	0	0	0	0	0	6	0	0
9	FW	John Marquis	11	0	0	1	0	0	0	0	0	0	0	0	12	0	0
10	MF	Tommy Rowe	4	0	0	0	0	0	0	0	0	0	0	0	4	0	0
11	FW	Andy Williams	1	0	0	0	0	0	0	0	0	0	0	0	1	0	0
12	MF	Ben Whiteman	7	0	0	1	0	0	0	0	0	0	0	0	8	0	0
13	GK	Marko Maroši	1	0	0	0	0	0	0	0	0	0	0	0	1	0	0
14	FW	Liam Mandeville	0	0	0	1	0	0	0	0	0	1	0	0	2	0	0
15	DF	Joe Wright	6	0	0	0	0	0	1	0	0	0	0	0	7	0	0
16	MF	Jordan Houghton	8	0	0	0	0	0	0	0	0	0	0	0	8	0	0
17	MF	Matty Blair	2	0	0	0	0	0	0	0	0	0	0	0	2	0	0
18	DF	Tom Anderson	2	0	0	0	0	0	0	0	0	0	0	0	2	0	0
19	FW	Alfie May	2	0	0	0	0	0	0	0	0	0	0	0	2	0	0
22	MF	Alfie Beestin	1	0	0	0	0	0	0	0	0	0	0	0	1	0	0
26	MF	James Coppinger	1	0	0	0	0	0	0	0	0	0	0	0	1	0	0
27	MF	Issam Ben Khémis	0	0	0	1	0	0	0	0	0	0	0	0	1	0	0
Total			62	0	0	6	0	0	2	0	0	1	0	0	71	0	0

== Transfers ==
=== Transfers in ===
Date from	Position	Nationality	Name	From	Fee	Ref.
1 July 2017	LB	(England)	Danny Andrew	Grimsby Town	Free	
1 July 2017	RW	(England)	Alex Kiwomya	Chelsea	Free	
1 July 2017	CB	(England)	Niall Mason	Aston Villa	Undisclosed	
3 August 2017	RM	(Tunisia)	Issam Ben Khémis	Lorient	Free	
11 January 2018	AM	(England)	Benjamin Whiteman	Sheffield United	Undisclosed	
16 January 2018	LB	(Republic of Ireland)	Shane Blaney	Finn Harps	Undisclosed	

=== Transfers out ===
Date from	Position	Nationality	Name	To	Fee	Ref.
1 July 2017	CM	(Republic of Ireland)	Paul Keegan	Waterford	Released	(Note: Paul Keegan joined Waterford following his release.)
1 July 2017	MF	(England)	Joey McCormick	Pickering Town	Released	(Note: Joey McCormick joined Pickering Town following his release.)
1 July 2017	LW	(England)	Gary McSheffrey	Eastleigh	Released	(Note: Gary McSheffrey joined Eastleigh following his release.)
1 July 2017	CF	(Wales)	Joe Pugh	North Ferriby United	Released	(Note: Joe Pugh joined North Ferriby United following his release.)
1 July 2017	LB	(Scotland)	Aaron Taylor-Sinclair	Plymouth Argyle	Released	(Note: Aaron Taylor-Sinclair joined Plymouth Argyle following his release.)
31 August 2017	MF	(England)	Harry Middleton	Port Vale	Free	
25 January 2018	GK	(England)	Ross Etheridge	Nuneaton Town	Released	(Note: Ross Etheridge joined Nuneaton Town following his release.)
27 January 2018	CM	(England)	Tony Donaldson		Released	

=== Loans in ===
Start date	Position	Nationality	Name	From	End date	Ref.
1 July 2017	AM	(England)	Benjamin Whiteman	Sheffield United	January 2018	
3 August 2017	CM	(Netherlands)	Rodney Kongolo	Manchester City	January 2018	
30 August 2017	DM	(England)	Jordan Houghton	Chelsea	3 January 2018	
31 August 2017	LB	(England)	Harry Toffolo	Norwich City	3 January 2018	
4 January 2018	CM	(Netherlands)	Rodney Kongolo	Manchester City	End of season	
5 January 2018	DM	(England)	Jordan Houghton	Chelsea	End of season	
30 January 2018	CB	(Republic of Ireland)	Andy Boyle	Preston North End	End of season	
31 January 2018	CB	(England)	Tom Anderson	Burnley	End of season	

=== Loans out ===
Date from	Position	Nationality	Name	To	Date until	Ref.
1 July 2017	LB	(France)	Cedric Evina	Crawley Town	30 June 2018	
3 July 2017	RB	(England)	Mitchell Lund	Morecambe	30 June 2018	
12 August 2017	DF	(England)	Reece Fielding	Biggleswade Town	January 2018	(Note: On 14 September 2017, Reece Fielding extended his loan with Biggleswade Town until January 2018.)
12 August 2017	GK	(England)	Louis Jones	Gainsborough Trinity	10 September 2017	
12 August 2017	DF	(England)	Tyler Walker	Biggleswade Town	January 2018	(Note: On 14 September 2017, Tyler Walker extended his loan with Biggleswade Town until January 2018.)
1 September 2017	FW	(England)	Will Longbottom	Kidderminster Harriers	28 September 2017	
14 September 2017	GK	(England)	Louis Jones	Tadcaster Albion	11 October 2017	(Note: On 29 September 2017, Louis Jones was recalled to Doncaster Rovers following an injury to Ian Lawlor.)
10 November 2017	GK	(England)	Louis Jones	Sheffield	10 December 2017	
24 December 2017	DF	(England)	Kane Bingley	Ossett Town		
31 January 2018	FW	(England)	Liam Mandeville	Colchester United	End of season	
2 February 2018	DF	(Northern Ireland)	Danny Amos	Buxton	2 March 2018	
2 February 2018	DF	(England)	Reece Fielding	Biggleswade Town	End of season	
2 February 2018	DF	(England)	Tyler Walker	Biggleswade Town	End of season	
9 February 2018	FW	(England)	Will Longbottom	Halesowen Town	10 March 2018	

== Competitions ==
=== Friendlies ===
11 July 2017	Armthorpe Welfare	0–9	Doncaster Rovers	Armthorpe
19:30		Report	Rowe 29'; Coppinger 31', 32'; Williams 34'; Whiteman 57'; Mandeville 62', 77', 84'; Marquis 75'	Stadium: Welfare Ground

15 July 2017	Tadcaster Albion	0–2	Doncaster Rovers	Tadcaster
15:00 BST		Report	McSheffrey 57'; Mandeville 71' (pen.)	Stadium: i2i Stadium

18 July 2017	Doncaster Rovers	1–1	Derby County	Doncaster
19:45 BST	Rowe 59'	Report	Keogh 14'	Stadium: Keepmoat Stadium

22 July 2017	Guiseley	0–1	Doncaster Rovers	Guiseley
15:00 BST		Report	Mandeville 19'	Stadium: Nethermoor Park

25 July 2017	Doncaster Rovers	1–2	Sheffield Wednesday	Doncaster
19:30 BST	Mandeville 43'	Report	Winnall 30'; Hooper 67'	Stadium: Keempoat Stadium

29 July 2017	Chesterfield	4–0	Doncaster Rovers	Chesterfield
15:00 BST	Dennis 55'; Brewster 71'; Ugwu 83'; Mitchell 85'	Report		Stadium: Proact Stadium

=== League One ===
==== League table ====
Pos	Team	Pld	W	D	L	GF	GA	GD	Pts
13	Bristol Rovers	46	16	11	19	60	66	−6	59
14	Fleetwood Town	46	16	9	21	59	68	−9	57
15	Doncaster Rovers	46	13	17	16	52	52	0	56
16	Oxford United	46	15	11	20	61	66	−5	56
17	Gillingham	46	13	17	16	50	55	−5	56

Source: BBC Sport
Rules for classification: 1) Points; 2) Goal difference; 3) Number of goals scored

==== Results summary ====
Overall								Home						Away					
Pld	W	D	L	GF	GA	GD	Pts	W	D	L	GF	GA	GD	W	D	L	GF	GA	GD
46	13	17	16	52	52	0	56	7	9	7	30	25	+5	6	8	9	22	27	−5

Last updated: 5 May 2018.
Source: 11v11.com

==== Results by matchday ====
Matchday	1	2	3	4	5	6	7	8	9	10	11	12	13	14	15	16	17	18	19	20	21	22	23	24	25	26	27	28	29	30	31	32	33	34	35	36	37	38	39	40	41	42	43	44	45	46
Ground	H	A	H	A	H	A	A	H	A	H	A	H	A	H	H	A	H	A	A	H	A	H	A	H	H	A	H	A	A	H	A	H	A	H	A	A	H	A	A	A	H	H	H	A	H	H
Result	D	W	D	L	D	L	L	L	W	L	L	W	L	W	L	W	D	D	L	W	L	D	W	W	W	D	D	D	D	L	D	D	L	W	L	D	W	W	D	W	D	L	L	D	D	L
Position	13	7	8	12	12	16	16	19	17	18	19	17	18	17	18	17	16	17	18	16	18	18	14	13	10	11	12	12	11	14	14	14	16	14	14	15	14	13	14	14	13	14	14	15	14	15

Updated to match(es) played on 5 May 2018. Source: 11v11.com
A = Away; H = Home; W = Win; D = Draw; L = Loss

==== Matches ====
On 21 June 2017, the league fixtures were announced.

5 August 2017 1	Doncaster Rovers	0–0	Gillingham	Doncaster
15:00 BST		Report	Eaves (yellow card) 61'	Stadium: Keepmoat Stadium; Attendance: 7,512; Referee: Dean Whitestone

12 August 2017 2	Blackburn Rovers	1–3	Doncaster Rovers	Blackburn
15:00 BST	Mulgrew (yellow card) 66'; Evans (yellow card) 74'; Samuel 87'	Report	Marquis 46'; Coppinger 67' (pen.); May 82'	Stadium: Ewood Park; Attendance: 12,223; Referee: David Webb

19 August 2017 3	Doncaster Rovers	3–3	Blackpool	Doncaster
15:00 BST	Allsop 37' (o.g.); Marquis 45+1'; May 75'; Whiteman (yellow card) 85'	Report	Longstaff 38'; Turton 65'; Cooke 76'; Daniel (yellow card) 86'	Stadium: Keepmoat Stadium; Attendance: 7,558; Referee: Robert Jones

26 August 2017 4	AFC Wimbledon	2–0	Doncaster Rovers	Norbiton
15:00 BST	Oshilaga (yellow card) 48'; Appiah 58'; Barcham 60'	Report	Marquis (yellow card) 41'	Stadium: Kingsmeadow; Attendance: 4,144; Referee: Gavin Ward

2 September 2017 5	Doncaster Rovers	0–0	Peterborough United	Doncaster
15:00 BST	Mason (yellow card) 58'; Marquis (yellow card) 79'	Report	Grant (yellow card) 35'; Taylor (yellow card) 41'; Edwards (yellow card) 90'	Stadium: Keepmoat Stadium; Attendance: 8,677; Referee: Graham Salisbury

9 September 2017 6	Northampton Town	1–0	Doncaster Rovers	Northampton
15:00 BST	Crooks 1'	Report	Whiteman (yellow card) 32'	Stadium: Sixfields Stadium; Attendance: 5,843; Referee: Darren Handley

12 September 2017 7	Rochdale	2–1	Doncaster Rovers	Spotland
19:45 BST	Bunney (yellow card) 45'; McNulty (yellow card) 87'; Kitching 90+2'; Davies 90+4'	Report	Williams (yellow card) 40'; Marquis 74'	Stadium: Spotland Stadium; Attendance: 2,371; Referee: Ben Toner

17 September 2017 8	Doncaster Rovers	0–1	Scunthorpe United	Doncaster
15:00 BST	Whiteman (yellow card) 32'; Marquis (yellow card) 47'	Report	Novak 10'; Bishop (yellow card) 55'	Stadium: Keepmoat Stadium; Attendance: 9,227; Referee: David Webb

23 September 2017 9	Plymouth Argyle	0–3	Doncaster Rovers	Plymouth
15:00 BST	Miller (yellow card) 15'; Lameiras (yellow card) 24'; Songo'o (yellow card) 40'; Bradley (red card) 80'	Report	Butler 19'; Houghton (yellow card) 42'; May (yellow card) 50' (goal) 73'; Marquis 59'	Stadium: Home Park; Attendance: 8,510; Referee: Nick Kinseley

26 September 2017 10	Doncaster Rovers	1–2	Shrewsbury Town	Doncaster
19:45 BST	Rowe 34'; Wright (yellow card) 59'	Report	Riley 35'; Ogogo (yellow card) 43'; Brown (yellow card) 68'; Gnahoua 90+4'	Stadium: Keepmoat Stadium; Attendance: 7,194; Referee: John Brooks

30 September 2017 11	Bradford City	2–0	Doncaster Rovers	Bradford
15:00 BST	Wyke 18'; Knight-Percival 42'; Reeves (yellow card) 48'; Chicksen (yellow card) 75'; Vincelot (yellow card) 80'	Report	Mason (yellow card) 81'	Stadium: Valley Parade; Attendance: 20,430; Referee: Anthony Backhouse

7 October 2017 12	Doncaster Rovers	4–1	Southend United	Doncaster
15:00 BST	Marquis 45+1' (yellow card) 80'; Whiteman 47', 50', 57' (pen.); Mason (yellow card) 85'	Report	Wordsworth (yellow card) 21' (goal) 38'; White (yellow card) 49'; Oxley (yellow card) 58'; Bwomono (yellow card) 81'; Ferdinand (red card) 90+5'	Stadium: Keepmoat Stadium; Attendance: 7,369; Referee: Darren Handley

14 October 2017 13	Charlton Athletic	1–0	Doncaster Rovers	Charlton
15:00 BST	Fosu 9' (yellow card) 43'; Dasilva (yellow card) 24'; Clarke (yellow card) 61'; Kashi (yellow card) 78'	Report	Houghton (yellow card) 30'; Marquis (yellow card) 66'; Butler (yellow card) 83'	Stadium: The Valley; Referee: Robert Lewis

17 October 2017 14	Doncaster Rovers	2–1	Portsmouth	Doncaster
19:45 BST	Mandeville 3'; Burgess 5' (o.g.); Rowe (yellow card) 78'	Report	Baudry 54' (o.g.); Burgess (yellow card) 58'; Donohue (red card) 71'; O'Keefe (yellow card) 87'	Stadium: Keepmoat Stadium; Attendance: 7,211; Referee: Martin Coy

21 October 2017 15	Doncaster Rovers	0–3	Walsall	Doncaster
15:00 BST	Houghton (yellow card) 54'	Report	Guthrie (yellow card) 35'; Oztumer 62', 66'; Morris 80'; Edwards (yellow card) 87'	Stadium: Keepmoat Stadium; Attendance: 7,391; Referee: Kevin Johnson

28 October 2017 16	Bury	0–1	Doncaster Rovers	Bury
15:00 BST	O'Connell (red card) 45+3'; Maguire (yellow card) 67'	Report	Marquis (yellow card) 36'; Whiteman 78'	Stadium: Gigg Lane; Attendance: 3,079; Referee: Andy Haines

11 November 2017 17	Doncaster Rovers	1–1	Rotherham United	Doncaster
12:30 GMT	Wood 62' (o.g.); Lawlor (yellow card) 90+6'	Report	Ihiekwe (yellow card) 72'; Moore 90+6'	Stadium: Keepmoat Stadium; Attendance: 12,481; Referee: Graham Scott

18 November 2017 18	Fleetwood Town	0–0	Doncaster Rovers	Fleetwood
15:00 GMT	Bolger (yellow card) 66'	Report	Baudry (yellow card) 67'	Stadium: Highbury Stadium; Attendance: 3,181; Referee: John Busby

21 November 2017 19	Wigan Athletic	3–0	Doncaster Rovers	Wigan
19:45 GMT	Burn (yellow card) 22'; Byrne (yellow card) 31'; Wright 40' (o.g.); Colclough 45+2', 58' (yellow card) 53'	Report	Houghton (yellow card) 34'; Wright (yellow card) 36'	Stadium: DW Stadium; Attendance: 7,966; Referee: Carl Boyeson

25 November 2017 20	Doncaster Rovers	2–1	Milton Keynes Dons	Doncaster
15:00 GMT	Marquis 54'; Blair 71'	Report	Aneke 3'; Ebanks-Landell (yellow card) 86'; Gilbey (yellow card) 90+4'	Stadium: Keepmoat Stadium; Attendance: 7,743; Referee: Eddie Ilderton

9 December 2017 21	Oxford United	1–0	Doncaster Rovers	Oxford
15:00 GMT	Tiendalli (yellow card) 35'; Mousinho (yellow card) 39'; Ricardinho (yellow card) 88'; Ruffels 90+6'	Report	Wright (yellow card) 68'; Lawlor (yellow card) 79'; Houghton (yellow card) 83'	Stadium: Kassam Stadium; Attendance: 6,711; Referee: Seb Stockbridge

16 December 2017 22	Doncaster Rovers	1–1	Oldham Athletic	Doncaster
15:00 GMT	Butler 59'	Report	Gerrard (yellow card) 59'; Doyle 88'	Stadium: Keepmoat Stadium; Attendance: 7,831; Referee: Gavin Ward

23 December 2017 23	Bristol Rovers	0–1	Doncaster Rovers	Horfield
15:00 GMT	Partington (yellow card) 76'; Sercombe (yellow card) 90+1'	Report	Mason 33' (pen.); Wright (yellow card) 62'; Houghton (yellow card) 77'	Stadium: Memorial Stadium; Attendance: 8,300; Referee: Dean Whitestone

26 December 2017 24	Doncaster Rovers	3–0	Northampton Town	Doncaster
15:00 GMT	Coppinger 33'; Mason 43' (pen.); Butler 66'	Report	Hoskins (yellow card) 58'	Stadium: Keepmoat Stadium; Attendance: 8,032; Referee: Ben Toner

29 December 2017 25	Doncaster Rovers	2–0	Rochdale	Doncaster
19:45 GMT	Whiteman 4'; May 27'; Marquis (yellow card) 64'	Report	Daniels (yellow card) 62'	Stadium: Keepmoat Stadium; Attendance: 7,997; Referee: Ross Joyce

1 January 2018 26	Peterborough United	1–1	Doncaster Rovers	Peterborough
15:00 GMT	Lloyd-McGoldrick 4'; Maddison (yellow card) 34'; Penny (yellow card) 57'	Report	Wright (yellow card) 59'; Mason (yellow card) 71'; Whiteman 90+3'	Stadium: London Road Stadium; Attendance: 5,173; Referee: John Brooks

6 January 2018 P	Scunthorpe United	v	Doncaster Rovers	Scunthorpe
15:00 GMT				Stadium: Glanford Park
Note: On 8 December, it was announced the away trip to face Scunthorpe United was to be rescheduled due to FA Cup involvement.

13 January 2018 27	Doncaster Rovers	1–1	Plymouth Argyle	Doncaster
15:00 GMT	Beestin 37'; Rowe (yellow card) 63'; May (yellow card) 74'; Baudry (yellow card) 90+1'	Report	Edwards 74'	Stadium: Keepmoat Stadium; Attendance: 7,494; Referee: Andy Haines

20 January 2018 28	Shrewsbury Town	2–2	Doncaster Rovers	Shrewsbury
15:00 GMT	Sadler 21'; Nsiala (yellow card) 31'; Morris 52'; Hendrie (yellow card) 74'	Report	Butler (yellow card) 8'; Baudry 62'; Mason (yellow card) 64'; Ben Khémis 76'; Whiteman (yellow card) 81'; Blair (yellow card) 81'	Stadium: New Meadow; Attendance: 5,818; Referee: Anthony Backhouse

23 January 2018 29	Scunthorpe United	1–1	Doncaster Rovers	Scunthorpe
19:45 GMT	Hopper 3'; Bishop (yellow card) 30'; Wallace (yellow card) 40'	Report	Rowe (yellow card) 24'; Beestin 90+6'; Beestin (yellow card) 90+7'	Stadium: Glanford Park; Attendance: 5,193; Referee: Eddie Ilderton

27 January 2018 30	Doncaster Rovers	1–3	Bristol Rovers	Doncaster
15:00 GMT	Marquis 4'; Whiteman (yellow card) 39'	Report	Sweeney 24'; Gaffney 50'; Harrison (yellow card) 83'; Harrison 85'	Stadium: Keepmoat Stadium; Attendance: 8,021; Referee: Darren Bond

3 February 2018 31	Portsmouth	2–2	Doncaster Rovers	Portsmouth
15:00 GMT	Walkes 19'; Burgess (yellow card) 45+3'; Donohue (yellow card) 45+3'; Pitman 81'; Burgess (yellow card) 90+3' (red card)	Report	Coppinger 4'; Marquis (yellow card) 45+3'; Marquis 63'; Anderson (yellow card) 90+1'	Stadium: Fratton Park; Attendance: 17,364; Referee: Graham Salisbury

10 February 2018 32	Doncaster Rovers	1–1	Charlton Athletic	Doncaster
15:00 GMT	Anderson (yellow card) 48'; Houghton (yellow card) 62'; Blair (yellow card) 73'; Blair 90+4'	Report	Bauer 18'; Solly (yellow card) 76'; Amos (yellow card) 85'	Stadium: Keepmoat Stadium; Attendance: 7,797; Referee: Mark Heywood

13 February 2018 33	Walsall	4–2	Doncaster Rovers	Walsall
19:45 GMT	Edwards 22'; Edwards 24'; Morris 45+1'; Bakayoko 71'	Report	Rowe 87'; Mason 90+1' (pen.)	Stadium: Bescot Stadium; Attendance: 3,514; Referee: John Brooks

17 February 2018 34	Doncaster Rovers	3–0	Fleetwood Town	Doncaster
15:00 GMT	Kiwomya 13'; Anderson 27', 55'	Report	Diagouraga (yellow card) 54'; Dempsey (yellow card) 58'	Stadium: Keepmoat Stadium; Attendance: 7,013; Referee: Darren Drysdale

24 February 2018 35	Rotherham United	2–1	Doncaster Rovers	Rotherham
15:00 GMT	Smith 90+3'; Newell 90+13'	Report	Coppinger (yellow card) 32'; Marquis 39'; Maroši (yellow card) 90+13'	Stadium: New York Stadium; Attendance: 11,275; Referee: Geoff Eltringham

10 March 2018 36	Southend United	0–0	Doncaster Rovers	Southend-on-Sea
15:00 GMT		Report	Baudry (yellow card) 52'	Stadium: Roots Hall; Attendance: 6,766; Referee: Kevin Johnson

19 March 2018 37	Doncaster Rovers	2–0	Bradford City	Doncaster
19:45 GMT	Marquis 75' 90+2'	Report	Vincelot (yellow card) 56'	Stadium: Keepmoat Stadium; Attendance: 7,369; Referee: Darren Handley

30 March 2018 38	Blackpool	1–2	Doncaster Rovers	Blackpool
15:00 BST	Turton (yellow card) 36'; Daniel 56'; Tilt (yellow card) 69'; Spearing (yellow card) 77'; Ryan (yellow card) 78'	Report	Rowe 43' 70'; Marquis (yellow card) 88'	Stadium: Bloomfield Road; Attendance: 4,533; Referee: Ollie Yates

7 April 2018 39	Gillingham	0–0	Doncaster Rovers	Gillingham
15:00 BST	Wilkinson (yellow card) 13'	Report	McCullough (yellow card) 77'	Stadium: Priestfield Stadium; Attendance: 4,870; Referee: John Brooks

14 April 2018 40	Milton Keynes Dons	1–2	Doncaster Rovers	Milton Keynes
15:00 BST	Ugbo 19'; Pawlett (yellow card) 45+2'; Brittain (yellow card) 60'	Report	McCullough (yellow card) 37'; Marquis 49' (yellow card) 60' (goal) 63'; Wright (yellow card) 74'; Houghton (yellow card) 76'; Whiteman (yellow card) 90+4'	Stadium: Stadium MK; Attendance: 8,954; Referee: Nick Kinseley

17 April 2018 41	Doncaster Rovers	3–3	Bury	Doncaster
19:45 BST	Butler 2'; Marquis 35'; Boyle 65'	Report	Mason 38' (o.g.); O'Shea 51' (pen.); Styles (yellow card) 58'; Miller 60'	Stadium: Keepmoat Stadium; Attendance: 7,131; Referee: Carl Boyeson

21 April 2018 42	Doncaster Rovers	0–1	Oxford United	Doncaster
15:00 BST	Baudry (yellow card) 6'	Report	Dickie (yellow card) 13'; Brannagan (yellow card) 41'; Henry 63'	Stadium: Keepmoat Stadium; Attendance: 8,255; Referee: Martin Coy

24 April 2018 43	Doncaster Rovers	0–1	Blackburn Rovers	Doncaster
19:45 BST	Marquis (yellow card) 79'	Report	Mulgrew (yellow card) 46'; Conway (yellow card) 55'; Mulgrew 80'	Stadium: Keepmoat Stadium; Attendance: 10,443; Referee: Eddie Ilderton

28 April 2018 44	Oldham Athletic	0–0	Doncaster Rovers	Oldham
15:00 BST	Benyu (yellow card) 55'	Report	Whiteman (yellow card) 28'	Stadium: Boundary Park; Attendance: 5,297; Referee: Chris Sarginson

1 May 2018 45	Doncaster Rovers	0–0	AFC Wimbledon	Doncaster
19:45 BST		Report	Barcham (yellow card) 89'	Stadium: Keepmoat Stadium; Attendance: 7,094; Referee: John Brooks

5 May 2018 46	Doncaster Rovers	0–1	Wigan Athletic	Doncaster
17:30 BST		Report	Grigg 75' (yellow card) 76'	Stadium: Keepmoat Stadium; Attendance: 12,057; Referee: David Webb

=== FA Cup ===
In the FA Cup, Doncaster Rovers were drawn away to Ebbsfleet United in the first round, Scunthorpe United at home in the second round and Rochdale at home in the third round.

4 November 2017 First round	Ebbsfleet United	2–6	Doncaster Rovers	Northfleet
15:00 GMT	Rance (yellow card) 2'; Kedwell 35' (pen.); Coulson 37'; Bush (yellow card) 64' (yellow-red card) 80'; Magri (yellow card) 76'; Brandy (yellow card) 87'	Report	Lawlor (yellow card) 35'; Blair 45+1'; Marquis 45+3'; Coppinger 52', 83' (pen.); Kongolo (yellow card) 57'; Houghton 78'; Rowe 85'; Ben Khémis (yellow card) 90+2'	Stadium: Kuflink Stadium; Attendance: 2,069; Referee: Lee Collins

3 December 2017 Second round	Doncaster Rovers	3–0	Scunthorpe United	Doncaster
14:00 GMT	Rowe 16', 67'; Whiteman (yellow card) 75'; Mandeville (yellow card) 78' (goal) 90+2'	Report	Hopper (yellow card) 9'; Crofts (yellow card) 13'; Church (yellow card) 79'	Stadium: Keepmoat Stadium; Attendance: 5,251; Referee: Mark Heywood

6 January 2018 Third round	Doncaster Rovers	0–1	Rochdale	Doncaster
15:00 GMT	Marquis (yellow card) 28'	Report	McNulty (yellow card) 1'; Andrew 18'; Daniels (yellow card) 72'	Stadium: Keepmoat Stadium; Attendance: 4,513; Referee: Andy Woolmer

=== EFL Cup ===
On 16 June 2017, Doncaster Rovers were drawn away to Bradford City in the first round. A home tie versus Hull City was confirmed for the second round. An away trip to Premier League side Arsenal was drawn for the third round.

8 August 2017 First round	Bradford City	2–3	Doncaster Rovers	Bradford
19:45 BST	Poleon 35'; Vincelot (red card) 61'; Jones 84'	Report	May 8'; Kongolo 71'; Wright (yellow card) 72'; Whiteman 88'	Stadium: Valley Parade; Attendance: 3,175; Referee: Darren Drysdale

22 August 2017 Second round	Doncaster Rovers	2–0	Hull City	Doncaster
19:45 BST	May 48'; Rowe 54'	Report	Weir (yellow card) 73'; Batty (yellow card) 86'	Stadium: Keepmoat Stadium; Attendance: 7,139; Referee: Graham Salisbury

20 September 2017 Third round	Arsenal	1–0	Doncaster Rovers	Holloway
19:45 BST	Walcott 25'	Report	Mason (yellow card) 68'	Stadium: Emirates Stadium; Attendance: 44,064; Referee: Scott Duncan

=== EFL Trophy ===
On 12 July 2017, the group stage draw was complete with Doncaster Rovers facing Grimsby Town, Scunthorpe United and Sunderland U23s in Northern Group H. After finishing second in the group stages, Doncaster Rovers were drawn away to Rochdale in the second round.

Pos	Lge	Team	Pld	W	PW	PL	L	GF	GA	GD	Pts	Qualification
1	L1	Scunthorpe United (Q)	3	2	0	1	0	6	3	+3	7	Round 2
2	L1	Doncaster Rovers (Q)	3	1	2	0	0	3	2	+1	7	Round 2
3	L2	Grimsby Town (E)	3	0	0	2	1	3	4	−1	2	
4	ACA	Sunderland U21 (E)	3	0	1	0	2	2	5	−3	2	

Updated to match(es) played on 8 October 2017. Source: EFL.com
(E) Eliminated; (Q) Qualified to the phase indicated

29 August 2017 Group Game 1	Grimsby Town	1–1 (3–4 p)	Doncaster Rovers	Cleethorpes
19:45 BST	Jones (yellow card) 20'; Cardwell 29'; Davies (yellow card) 69'	Report	Williams 38'; Mandeville (yellow card) 86'	Stadium: Blundell Park; Attendance: 862; Referee: Mike Jones
	Penalties
	Davies (penalty scored); Hooper (penalty scored); Mills (penalty scored); Jones (penalty missed); Bolarinwa (penalty missed); Cardwell (penalty missed)		Middleton (penalty scored); Williams (penalty missed); Beestin (penalty scored); Mandeville (penalty missed); Alcock (penalty scored); Kongolo (penalty scored)

3 October 2017 Group Game 2	Doncaster Rovers	1–0	Sunderland U23s	Doncaster
19:30 BST	Ben Khémis 69'	Report	Love (yellow card) 38'	Stadium: Keepmoat Stadium; Attendance: 1,520; Referee: Ross Joyce

31 October 2017 Group Game 3	Doncaster Rovers	1–1 (3–2 p)	Scunthorpe United	Doncaster
19:30 GMT	Mandeville 37'	Report	Lewis 55'; Hopper (yellow card) 76'; Adelakun (yellow card) 83'	Stadium: Keepmoat Stadium; Attendance: 1,717; Referee: Ben Toner
	Penalties
	Mason (penalty scored); Beestin (penalty missed); Fletcher (penalty missed); Mandeville (penalty scored); Ben Khémis (penalty scored)		van Veen (penalty scored); Madden (penalty missed); Lewis (penalty missed); Adelakun (penalty scored); Goode (penalty missed)

28 November 2017 Second round	Rochdale	1–1 (5–4 p)	Doncaster Rovers	Spotland
19:30 GMT	Gillam 33' (pen.); Camps (yellow card) 53'; Kitching (yellow card) 79'	Report	Whiteman (yellow card) 55'; Mandeville 72'	Stadium: Spotland Stadium; Attendance: 786
	Penalties
	Andrew (penalty scored); McGahey (penalty scored); Bunney (penalty scored); Inman (penalty scored); Kitching (penalty scored)		Mason (penalty scored); Mandeville (penalty scored); Ben Khémis (penalty scored); Alcock (penalty scored); Rowe (penalty missed)
