= Rondon =

Rondón or Rondon is a surname of Spanish, Portuguese or French origin. The name may refer to:

== People ==
=== Sports ===
- Alexander Rondón (born 1977), Venezuelan football player
- Ángel Rondón (born 1997), Dominican baseball player
- Antonio Senzatela born Antonio Senzatela Rondón (born 1995), Venezuelan baseball player
- Bruce Rondón (born 1990), Venezuelan baseball player
- Cindy Rondón (born 1988), Dominican volleyball player
- Gilberto Rondón (born 1953), American baseball player
- Héctor Rondón (born 1988), Venezuelan baseball player
- Mario Rondón (born 1986), Venezuelan footballer
- Salomón Rondón (born 1989), Venezuelan footballer
- Vicente Rondón (1938–1992), Venezuelan boxer

=== Other people ===
- Cândido Rondon (1865–1958), Brazilian military officer and Amazon explorer
- José da Silva Rondon (died 1897), Brazilian military officer, acting governor of Mato Grosso in 1891
- Diosdado Cabello born Diosdado Cabello Rondon (born 1963), Venezuelan politician
- Héctor Rondón Lovera, Venezuelan photographer; see World Press Photo of the Year, 1962
- Juan Rondón (fl. 1843), Puerto Rican politician
- Mariana Rondón (born 1966), Venezuelan cinema director, screenwriter, producer and visual artist
- Rafael Ángel Rondón Márquez (1898–1966), Venezuelan writer and historian
- Ponciano Rondón (1930-2017), Abogado Dominicano, Fundador y primer presidente Colegio Dominicano de Notarios, Pasado Gran Maestro Gran Logia de la República Dominicana
- Micky Bane (born as Miguel Angel Rondón (1979-) Peruvian voice actor and writer.

== Places ==
=== Brazil ===
- Marechal Cândido Rondon, a municipality in the state of Paraná
- Marechal Rondon International Airport, Cuiabá
- Rondon do Pará, a municipality in the state of Pará
- Rondônia, a state
- Rondon, Paraná, a municipality in the state of Paraná

=== Colombia ===
- Puerto Rondón, a town and municipality in the Arauca Department
- Rondón, Boyacá, a town and municipality in Boyacá Department

== Animals ==
- Rondon's marmoset
- Rondon's tuco-tuco

== Cuisine ==
- Rondón or Run down, an Afro-Caribbean dish present in Latin American Cuisine
- Rodon (disambiguation)
