= Reece Fielding =

English footballer

Personal information
- Full name: Reece Thomas Fielding
- Date of birth: 23 September 1998 (age 28)
- Place of birth: Doncaster, England
- Position: Defender

Team information
- Current team: Sheffield FC

Youth career
- Doncaster Rovers

Senior career*
Years	Team	Apps	(Gls)
2016–2018	Doncaster Rovers	0	(0)
2016	→ Frickley Athletic (loan)	21	(0)
2017	→ Biggleswade Town (loan)	50	(3)
2018	Ossett United	6	(0)
2018–2022	Stocksbridge Park Steels	95	(7)
2022–	Sheffield FC	34	(8)
- * Club domestic league appearances and goals as of 09.00 12 March 2023 (UTC)

Reece Thomas Fielding (born 23 September 1998) is an English professional footballer who plays as a defender for Sheffield FC.

== Playing career ==
Fielding progressed through the Doncaster Rovers youth team to sign a two-year scholarship contract in May 2015. He then went on to sign an 18-month professional contract in 2016, following regular training with the first team squad. He made his first-team debut at the age of 17 in a 2–0 win over Mansfield Town in an EFL Trophy group stage game at Field Mill on 30 August 2016. He then went on to make 2 more appearances for Darren Fergusons squad in the same trophy against Derby County and Sunderland, while featuring in many match day squads in the league campaign.

== Statistics ==
As of 27 October 2017.

Appearances and goals by club, season and competition
Club	Season	League			FA Cup		EFL Cup		Other		Total	
Club	Season	Division	Apps	Goals	Apps	Goals	Apps	Goals	Apps	Goals	Apps	Goals
Doncaster Rovers	2015–16	League One	0	0	0	0	0	0	0	0	0	0
Doncaster Rovers	2016–17	League Two	0	0	0	0	0	0	2 (Note: Appearance/s in the EFL Trophy)	0	2	0
Doncaster Rovers	2017–18	League One	0	0	0	0	0	0	1	0	1	0
Career total			0	0	0	0	0	0	3	0	3	0
