= Liam Mandeville =

English footballer (born 1997)

Personal information
- Full name: Liam Mandeville
- Date of birth: 17 February 1997 (age 29)
- Place of birth: Lincoln, England
- Position: Winger

Team information
- Current team: Chesterfield
- Number: 7

Youth career
- –2015: Doncaster Rovers

Senior career*
Years	Team	Apps	(Gls)
2015–2019	Doncaster Rovers	49	(9)
2015	→ Whitby Town (loan)	1	(0)
2018	→ Colchester United (loan)	7	(0)
2018–2019	→ Morecambe (loan)	42	(3)
2019–	Chesterfield	300	(38)

International career
2022	England C	1	(0)
- * Club domestic league appearances and goals as of 07:30, 28 May 2025 (UTC)

Liam Mandeville (born 17 February 1997) is an English professional footballer who plays as winger for EFL League Two club Chesterfield.

== Career ==
Mandeville made his first team debut for Doncaster Rovers on 3 April 2015, coming on as a second-half substitute for Jonson Clarke-Harris in a home League One match against Bradford City at the Keepmoat Stadium. In November 2015, he joined Northern Premier League Premier Division side Whitby Town on a one-month loan deal. Mandeville scored his first professional goal for Doncaster Rovers in a 2–1 defeat to Walsall at the Keepmoat Stadium.

Mandeville scored his first goal of the season in an EFL Cup game against Nottingham Forest which Rovers went onto lose 2–1. On 8 October 2016 Andy Williams was injured in a game v Barnet which gave Mandeville a chance in the first team. He started his goal scoring form with a goal against Oldham in the FA Cup which Rovers lost 2–1 again. Mandeville inspired Rovers to come from 1–0 behind to defeat Exeter 3–1. He got a goal and assist which led him to start against Hartlepool and he scored the winner in this game. He scored 2 more against Leyton Orient and another against Stevenage. Mandeville missed a late penalty against Plymouth in a 2–0 defeat. Plymouth's goalkeeper Luke McCormick mocked him which led to captain James Coppinger being sent off in the aftermath. He then scored from a free kick to earn Doncaster a win against Grimsby Town. This capped off the week that Mandeville won the EFL young player of the month.

On 31 January 2018, he joined League Two club Colchester United on loan until the end of the 2017–18 season. He made his Colchester debut from the bench on 10 February in their 1–1 draw at Carlisle United.

He was released by Doncaster at the end of the 2018–19 season.

On 5 June 2019, Mandeville signed a two-year contract with Chesterfield. In October 2022, he signed a new contract with Chesterfield until the summer of 2024. In the 2022–23 season, Mandeville won the club's Player of the Year award having contributed 9 goals and 14 assists to the side. In the play-offs, Mandeville added to this tally by scoring the winner for Chesterfield in the semi-final tie against Bromley, scoring in extra time. In the play-off final, Mandeville started for Chesterfield against Notts County at Wembley Stadium. However, the Spireites lost on penalties. During the 2023–24 season, Chesterfield were promoted to the EFL as champions and he was named in the division's Team of the Year for his contributions. Mandeville showed his versatility by playing at right full back as well as his more usual attacking midfield and forward roles throughout the season. He was named Player of the Year for a second time for the 2025–26 season.

== Style of play ==
"He's got a lot of attributes that I want from an attacker; he's got good vision, he can finish with both feet and he's very good technically." Darren Ferguson on Mandeville in 2016.

"It is definitely helping my game. They say that when you are a kid you should play different positions to get a good understanding of the game – I am just a little bit older!" Liam Mandeville October 2023.

== Career statistics ==
As of match played 15 May 2026

Appearances and goals by club, season and competition
Club	Season	League			FA Cup		League Cup		Other		Total	
Club	Season	Division	Apps	Goals	Apps	Goals	Apps	Goals	Apps	Goals	Apps	Goals
Doncaster Rovers	2014–15	League One	3	0	0	0	0	0	0	0	3	0
Doncaster Rovers	2015–16	League One	8	1	0	0	0	0	2	0	10	1
Doncaster Rovers	2016–17	League Two	21	7	1	1	1	1	4	1	27	10
Doncaster Rovers	2017–18	League One	17	1	2	1	1	0	4	2	24	4
Doncaster Rovers	Total		49	9	3	2	2	1	10	3	64	15
Whitby Town (loan)	2015–16	NPL Premier Division	1	0	1	0	—		1^{[a]}	0	3	0
Colchester United (loan)	2017–18	League Two	7	0	—		—		0	0	7	0
Morecambe (loan)	2018–19	League Two	42	3	2	0	1	1	1	0	46	4
Chesterfield	2019–20	National League	31	4	2	0	—		1^{[a]}	0	34	4
Chesterfield	2020–21	National League	34	2	0	0	—		3^{[b]}	1	37	3
Chesterfield	2021–22	National League	43	2	3	1	—		2^{[c]}	0	48	3
Chesterfield	2022–23	National League	46	9	5	0	—		2^{[c]}	1	53	10
Chesterfield	2023–24	National League	45	8	3	0	—		0	0	48	8
Chesterfield	2024–25	League Two	42	4	2	0	0	0	6^{[d]}	0	50	4
Chesterfield	2025–26	League Two	46	6	2	0	1	0	5^{[e]}	0	54	6
Chesterfield	Total		287	35	17	1	1	0	19	2	324	38
Career total			386	47	23	3	4	2	31	5	444	57

a. Appearances in FA Trophy.
b. 2 appearances in FA Trophy and 1 appearance, 1 goal in National League play-offs.
c. Appearances in National League play-offs.
d. 4 appearances in EFL Trophy, 2 appearances in EFL League Two play-offs.
e. 3 appearances in EFL Trophy, 2 appearances in EFL League Two play-offs.

== Honours ==
Chesterfield

- National League: 2023–24

Individual

- Chesterfield Player of the Year: 2022–23, 2025–26
- National League Team of the Season: 2023–24
