= Peter Rodon =

Welsh footballer

Personal information
- Full name: Peter Clive Rodon
- Date of birth: 5 February 1945
- Place of birth: Swansea, Wales
- Date of death: July 2000 (aged 55)
- Place of death: Swansea, Wales
- Position: Centre forward

Youth career
- 19xx–1964: Swansea City

Senior career*
Years	Team	Apps	(Gls)
1964–1967	Bradford City	64	(15)
- Merthyr Tydfil
- * Club domestic league appearances and goals

Peter Clive Rodon (5 February 1945 – July 2000) was a Welsh professional footballer who played as a centre forward.

== Career ==
Born in Swansea, after playing youth football with Swansea City, Rodon began his professional career with Bradford City, scoring 15 goals in 64 appearances in the Football League between 1964 and 1967. He later returned to Wales, playing with Merthyr Tydfil.

== Later and personal life ==
Rodon's son Chris, and grandson Joe have also played football professionally. Another son, Keri, father of Joe, played basketball for Wales.

Rodon died in Swansea in July 2000.
