= Alfie Beestin =

English footballer

Personal information
- Full name: Alfie Dillon Beestin
- Date of birth: 1 October 1997 (age 29)
- Place of birth: Leeds, England
- Position: Attacking midfielder

Team information
- Current team: Scunthorpe United
- Number: 8

Youth career
- i2i Football Development Centre
- –2016: Tadcaster Albion

Senior career*
Years	Team	Apps	(Gls)
2016–2019	Doncaster Rovers	34	(2)
2018–2019	→ Chesterfield (loan)	5	(0)
2019–2020	Tadcaster Albion	13	(1)
2020–	Scunthorpe United	224	(28)
- * Club domestic league appearances and goals as of 00:15, 8 October 2022 (UTC)

Alfie Dillon Beestin (born 1 October 1997) is an English professional footballer who plays as an attacking midfielder for National League club Scunthorpe United.

He was born in Leeds and trained with the York College/i2i Football Development Centre, also playing for the Tadcaster Albion development team.

== Early life ==
Born in Leeds, Beestin studied at The Co-operative Academy of Leeds, before moving on to York College, achieving a Level 2 Certificate in Sport and a Level 1 Coaching Award.

He started his career at the Tadcaster Albion development team, scoring four goals in three games. During a trial at Doncaster Rovers he impressed manager Darren Ferguson.

== Career ==
Beestin signed for Doncaster Rovers on 2 August 2016. Following his signing, manager Darren Ferguson said "ability-wise he's got a hell of a lot".

Beestin came on as a substitute against Mansfield Town in the EFL Trophy, scoring on his debut in a 2–0 victory. In a 5–1 victory against Morecambe Beestin made his League debut as a substitute In his fourth start for the club, he scored his first League goal, the opener in the 1–1 draw against Plymouth on 13 January 2018.

He was released by Doncaster at the end of the 2018–19 season.

Beestin joined Scunthorpe United in January 2020 having previously been playing with Tadcaster Albion.

== Career statistics ==
As of match played 2 February 2019

Club	Season	League			FA Cup		League Cup		Other		Total	
Club	Season	Division	Apps	Goals	Apps	Goals	Apps	Goals	Apps	Goals	Apps	Goals
Doncaster Rovers	2016–17	League Two	3	0	1	0	0	0	4 (Note: Appearances in the Football League Trophy)	1	8	1
Doncaster Rovers	2017–18	League One	26	2	3	0	1	0	3	0	33	2
Doncaster Rovers	2018–19	League One	5	0	0	0	1	0	3	0	9	0
Doncaster Rovers	Total		34	2	4	0	2	0	10	1	50	3
Chesterfield (loan)	2018–19	National League	5	0	—		—		3	0	8	0
Tadcaster Albion	2019–20	NPL Division One East	13	1	0	0	—		4 (Note: One appearance in League Challenge Cup; two appearances in FA Trophy; one appearance in West Riding County Cup)	0	17	1
Career total			52	3	4	0	2	0	17	1	75	4

== Honours ==
Scunthorpe United

- National League North play-offs: 2025
