= Issam Ben Khémis =

Footballer (born 1996)

Personal information
- Date of birth: 10 January 1996 (age 30)
- Place of birth: Paris, France
- Height: 1.75 m (5 ft 9 in)
- Position: Midfielder

Team information
- Current team: Épinal
- Number: 10

Youth career
- –2016: Lorient

Senior career*
Years	Team	Apps	(Gls)
2014–2017	Lorient B	80	(2)
2016–2017	Lorient	3	(0)
2017–2019	Doncaster Rovers	3	(0)
2019–2021	Stade Tunisien	54	(4)
2021–2022	Lège-Cap-Ferret	17	(0)
2022–2023	Poitiers	22	(1)
2023–2024	Angoulême	25	(2)
2024–2025	Bordeaux	7	(0)
2024–2025	Bordeaux B	16	(4)
2025–	Épinal	0	(0)

International career
2016	Tunisia	1	(0)
- * Club domestic league appearances and goals as of 17 May 2025

Issam Ben Khémis (born 10 January 1996) is a professional footballer who plays as a midfielder for Championnat National 1 club Épinal. Born in France, he played for the Tunisia national team.

== Club career ==
On 14 May 2016, Ben Khémis made his Ligue 1 debut against Gazélec Ajaccio.

On 15 July 2017, he featured as a trialist for English League One club Doncaster Rovers in their pre-season friendly against Tadcaster Albion, and on 3 August signed for the club on a two-year deal.

His competitive debut was in a 2–0 victory over Hull City in the second round of the EFL Cup on 22 August 2017. That season, he went on to make three appearances in League 1, one in the FA Cup, and 4 in the EFL Trophy where he scored the only goal in a 1–0 win against Sunderland's Under 23 side. He also scored two out of two times in penalty shoot outs in that competition.

The following season he struggled to make the squad, with two cup appearances and in the League he only made the bench, as an unused substitute once. He left Doncaster on 1 January 2019 after his contract was cancelled.

In January 2019, he signed a 2.5 years contract with Stade Tunisien.

In August 2024, Ben Khémis signed for Bordeaux.

== International career ==
Ben Khémis was born in France to parents of Tunisian descent. He made his debut for the Tunisia national team in a 2-0 2018 FIFA World Cup qualification victory over Guinea on 9 October 2016.

== Career statistics ==
=== Club ===
As of match played 7 December 2024

Appearances and goals by club, season and competition
Club	Season	League			National cup (Note: Includes Coupe de France, FA Cup, Tunisian Cup)		League cup (Note: Includes Coupe de la Ligue, EFL Cup)		Other		Total	
Club	Season	Division	Apps	Goals	Apps	Goals	Apps	Goals	Apps	Goals	Apps	Goals
Ivry	2013-14	CFA	1	0	0	0	—		—		1	0
Lorient B	2013-14	CFA 2	5	0	—		—		—		5	0
Lorient B	2014-15	CFA	27	1	—		—		—		27	1
Lorient B	2015-16	CFA	24	0	—		—		—		24	0
Lorient B	2016-17	CFA	24	1	—		—		—		24	1
Lorient B	Total		80	2	—		—		—		80	2
Lorient	2015-16	Ligue 1	1	0	0	0	0	0	—		1	0
Lorient	2016-17	Ligue 1	2	0	0	0	1	0	0	0	3	0
Lorient	Total		3	0	0	0	1	0	0	0	4	0
Doncaster Rovers	2017-18	League One	3	0	1	0	1	0	4 (Note: Appearance(s) in EFL Trophy)	1	9	1
Doncaster Rovers	2018-19	League One	0	0	0	0	1	0	1	0	2	0
Doncaster Rovers	Total		3	0	1	0	2	0	5	1	11	1
Stade Tunisien	2018-19	Tunisian Ligue Professionnelle 1	12	3	0	0	—		—		12	3
Stade Tunisien	2019-20	Tunisian Ligue Professionnelle 1	22	0	0	0	—		—		22	0
Stade Tunisien	2020-21	Tunisian Ligue Professionnelle 1	22	1	0	0	—		—		22	1
Stade Tunisien	Total		46	4	0	0	—		—		46	4
Lège-Cap-Ferret	2021-22	National 3	17	0	0	0	—		—		17	0
Poitiers	2022-23	National 3	22	1	0	0	—		—		22	1
Angoulême	2023-24	National 2	25	2	1	0	—		—		26	2
Bordeaux	2024-25	National 2	4	0	2	0	—		—		6	0
Bordeaux B	2024-25	National 3	4	0	—		—		—		4	0
Career total			215	9	4	0	3	0	5	1	227	10

=== International ===
As of match played 9 October 2016

Appearances and goals by national team and year
National team	Year	Apps	Goals
Tunisia	2016	1	0
Total		1	0
