= Chris Rodon =

Welsh footballer (born 1963)

Personal information
- Full name: Christopher Peter Rodon
- Date of birth: 9 June 1963 (age 63)
- Place of birth: Swansea, Wales
- Position: Striker

Senior career*
Years	Team	Apps	(Gls)
- Pontardawe Town
1983–1984	Brighton & Hove Albion	1	(0)
1983	→ Cardiff City (loan)	4	(0)
- Llanelli Town
- Haverfordwest County
Total		5+	(0+)
- * Club domestic league appearances and goals

Christopher Peter Rodon (born 9 June 1963) is a Welsh former professional footballer who played as a striker.

== Career ==
Born in Swansea, Rodon began his career in his native Wales playing part-time with Pontardawe Town, combining his career with working in the Swansea Driving Vehicle Licensing Centre, before moving to England with Brighton & Hove Albion, where he made one appearance in the Football League during the 1982–83 season. Rodon also made 4 appearances on loan at Cardiff City during the 1983–84 season. After leaving Brighton, Rodon returned to Wales to play with Llanelli Town. He later played for Haverfordwest County.

== Later and personal life ==
Rodon's father Peter, and nephew Joe Rodon also played football professionally. His brother Keri, father of Joe, played basketball for Wales. Another nephew, Sam, was also a footballer.
