= Jacob Fletcher =

English footballer

Personal information
- Full name: Jacob Frederick Fletcher
- Date of birth: 16 May 2000 (age 26)
- Position: Midfielder

Youth career
- Doncaster Rovers

Senior career*
Years	Team	Apps	(Gls)
2017–2019	Doncaster Rovers	1	(0)
- * Club domestic league appearances and goals as of 31 October 2017

Jacob Frederick Fletcher (born 16 May 2000) is an English professional footballer who plays as a midfielder.

== Club career ==
Fletcher is a Doncaster Rovers youth prospect, having joined the Academy in November 2012. He made his professional debut on 3 October 2017, starting in a 1–0 EFL Trophy home win against Sunderland U21.

Fletcher made his League One debut on 7 October 2017, coming on as a late substitute for Jordan Houghton in a 4–1 home routing of Southend United.

He was awarded a professional contract with Rovers at the beginning of May 2018.
