= Andy Williams (footballer, born 1986) =

English footballer (born 1986)

Personal information
- Full name: Andrew David Williams
- Date of birth: 14 August 1986 (age 40)
- Place of birth: Hereford, England
- Height: 6 ft 2 in (1.88 m)
- Position: Forward

Youth career
- 2002–2004: Hereford United

Senior career*
Years	Team	Apps	(Gls)
2004–2007	Hereford United	72	(18)
2007–2010	Bristol Rovers	88	(8)
2008–2009	→ Hereford United (loan)	16	(1)
2009	→ Hereford United (loan)	10	(1)
2010–2012	Yeovil Town	72	(22)
2012–2015	Swindon Town	89	(32)
2013–2014	→ Yeovil Town (loan)	9	(0)
2015–2018	Doncaster Rovers	92	(23)
2018–2020	Northampton Town	71	(20)
2020–2022	Cheltenham Town	68	(12)
2022–2023	Walsall	38	(1)
2023–2026	Hereford	111	(29)
Total		737	(167)
- * Club domestic league appearances and goals

Andrew David Williams (born 14 August 1986) is an English former professional footballer.

== Career ==
=== Hereford United ===
Williams was born in Hereford and attended the nearby football academy at Holme Lacy, playing for the Hereford United youth team. He also gained experience by attending football academies at Cheltenham Town, Aston Villa and Birmingham City.

Williams made his debut for the Hereford United first team in the 2003–04 season, coming on as a substitute in the Herefordshire Senior Cup final against Forest Green. The following season, he featured regularly on the bench and made three league appearances as a substitute. He also started the two GLS Conference Cup games against Burton and Northwich.

2005–06 was his breakthrough season. His appearances for the first team were initially from the bench but he was given his first start in the league against Woking, scoring the opening goal. He progressed rapidly and went on to become the club's top scorer for the season, scoring 13 goals from 45 appearances in all competitions. Most notably he scored two vital goals in the playoff semi-final against Morecambe, and in the final itself against Halifax. He signed a new contract with the club in March 2006.

His first season in the Football League saw him played out of position on the right wing for the majority of the season resulting in 48 first team appearances, with only Rob Purdie and Alan Connell making more appearances. Williams' eight goals also made him third highest goalscorer, and he was awarded the Away Goal of the Season for his goal against Bury.

Williams was the subject of two transfer bids from Bristol Rovers during the course of the season. At the end of August a £100,000 bid was rejected by Hereford, but at the end of January a £150,000 bid was accepted. However Williams turned down a move to the Gasheads, having already stated he was happy at Hereford and was not interested in moving to a club in the same division. When Bristol Rovers gained promotion to League One, speculation intensified that he would make the move, and on 5 July 2007 the transfer was finally confirmed.

=== Bristol Rovers ===
Williams made his debut for Bristol Rovers on 11 August 2007, scoring four minutes after appearing as a substitute for Rickie Lambert.

On 1 September 2008, Williams rejoined former club Hereford United on loan until 5 January 2009. An injury hampered his return to Edgar Street but he scored his first goal in the win over Carlisle United on 21 October. On expiry of his loan he returned to Bristol Rovers, but just 24 hours later he was loaned back to Hereford for the remainder of the season.

He was placed on the transfer list at the end of the 2008–09 season, but after some competitive performances from the bench he was removed from the list early on during the start of the 2009–10 season. On 29 September 2009, in an away 3–2 victory against Southampton, he scored a left-footed shot from the edge of the area, this goal was later nominated for Goal of the Year 2009.

=== Yeovil Town ===
In May 2010, Williams rejected a new deal with Bristol Rovers and signed a two-year contract with fellow League One side and local rivals Yeovil Town, he linked up with them on 1 July 2010. On 7 August 2010, Williams made his debut for Yeovil against Leyton Orient, and scored his first goal for the club against Rushden & Diamonds in the FA Cup, and scored his first league goal in a 3–1 defeat against Dagenham & Redbridge the following week. Williams first season with Yeovil saw him score eight goals in 39 matches mostly operating from the wing.

He started the new season well with a goal in a 3–1 win at home to Oldham Athletic before being out injured for over a month. However, once he had returned from injury he scored again, this time in a 3–0 win away at Hereford United in the FA Cup. Williams ended the campaign as Yeovil's top scorer with 17 goals in all competitions but rejected a new contract to remain at the club.

=== Swindon Town ===
Having rejected Yeovil's offer of a new contract, on 18 June 2012, it was confirmed Williams had signed for newly promoted League One side Swindon Town on a two-year contract.

==== Return to Yeovil on loan ====
On 23 August 2013, Williams rejoined Yeovil Town on a season long loan deal, only 14 months after previously leaving for Swindon Town. Williams made his second debut for Yeovil as a second-half substitute against Derby County, on 24 August 2013. Williams made a total of nine appearances without scoring before picking up serious cruciate injury in training ruling him out for the rest of the season. Despite being ruled out with injury for the rest of the season, due to the loan agreement with Swindon Town, Williams remained officially on loan at Yeovil for the remainder of the season, with Yeovil still having to pay a portion of his wages.

=== Doncaster Rovers ===
On 19 June 2015, Williams signed for Doncaster Rovers on a three-year deal, despite interest from several other clubs including Bradford City, Scunthorpe United, Sheffield United and Millwall. On 27 August he scored his first professional hat-trick in a 4–1 win over former club Yeovil Town. He was released by Doncaster in May 2018.

=== Cheltenham Town ===
In July 2020, he signed for Cheltenham Town, on a one-year deal. Following Cheltenham's title-winning campaign, Williams triggered a clause to sign a new one-year deal with the club. On 6 May 2022, Williams was released by the club after not being offered a further contract.

=== Walsall ===
On 15 June 2022, Williams agreed to join Walsall on a one-year contract, active from 1 July when his Cheltenham contract expired. He only managed 3 goals in 46 appearances across all competitions, being released at the end of the season.

=== Return to Hereford ===
On 6 June 2023, Williams agreed to drop down two leagues and enter part-time football by joining National League North club Hereford from 1 July, when his Walsall contract expired. Born in Hereford, Williams' career had begun at Hereford's predecessor club Hereford United 18 years previously. Williams suffered a knee injury in pre-season that required surgery and caused him to miss the first five months of the season. He made his debut for the club on 23 December 2023, coming on as a 73rd minute substitute for Tom Pugh in a 2–1 home league win against Spennymoor Town. He scored his first goals for the club three days later, including a 99th minute winner, in a 3–2 win away at local rivals Gloucester City. After scoring 11 goals in 23 games by the end of the season, on 3 May 2024, Hereford announced that Williams had signed a contract extension until the end of the 2024–25 season.

During the 2024–25 season, Williams appeared in all but two matches, scoring 10 goals in 48 appearances across all competitions, as Hereford finished 10th and missed out on the play-offs by one point. On 8 June 2025, he extended his stay at the club for a further year. He retired from football at the end of the 2025–26 season, aged 39, after scoring 31 goals in 121 appearances for Hereford.

== Career statistics ==
Appearances and goals by club, season and competition
Club	Season	League			FA Cup		League Cup		Other		Total	
Club	Season	Division	Apps	Goals	Apps	Goals	Apps	Goals	Apps	Goals	Apps	Goals
Hereford United	2004–05	Conference National	1	0	0	0	—		3 (Note: Two appearances in National League Cup (football), one appearance in FA Trophy)	0	4	0
Hereford United	2005–06	Conference National	31	10	4	0	—		9 (Note: Three appearances in Football League Trophy, three appearances and one goal in FA Trophy, three appearances and two goals in Football Conference play-offs)	3	41	13
Hereford United	2006–07	League Two	41	8	4	0	2	0	1 (Note: Appearance(s) in Football League Trophy)	1	48	9
Hereford United	Total		72	18	6	0	2	0	10	4	90	22
Bristol Rovers	2007–08	League One	41	4	8	1	2	1	1	0	52	6
Bristol Rovers	2008–09	League One	4	1	0	0	1	0	0	0	5	1
Bristol Rovers	2009–10	League One	43	3	1	0	1	0	0	0	45	3
Bristol Rovers	Total		88	8	9	1	4	1	1	0	102	10
Hereford United (loan)	2008–09	League One	26	2	2	0	0	0	1	0	29	2
Yeovil Town	2010–11	League One	37	6	2	2	1	0	0	0	40	8
Yeovil Town	2011–12	League One	35	16	3	1	1	0	0	0	39	17
Yeovil Town	Total		72	22	5	3	2	0	0	0	79	25
Swindon Town	2012–13	League One	40	11	1	0	4	1	3 (Note: Two appearances in League One play-offs, one appearance in Football League Trophy)	0	48	12
Swindon Town	2013–14	League One	3	0	0	0	1	1	0	0	4	1
Swindon Town	2014–15	League One	46	21	1	0	2	0	4 (Note: Two appearances in League One play-offs, two appearances and one goal in Football League Trophy)	1	53	22
Swindon Town	Total		89	32	2	0	7	2	7	1	105	35
Yeovil Town (loan)	2013–14	Championship	9	0	0	0	0	0	—		9	0
Doncaster Rovers	2015–16	League One	46	12	3	2	2	2	2	0	53	16
Doncaster Rovers	2016–17	League Two	37	11	0	0	1	0	2 (Note: Appearance(s) in EFL Trophy)	1	40	12
Doncaster Rovers	2017–18	League One	9	0	0	0	1	0	3	1	13	1
Doncaster Rovers	Total		92	23	3	2	4	2	7	2	106	29
Northampton Town	2018–19	League Two	39	12	1	0	0	0	4	0	44	12
Northampton Town	2019–20	League Two	32	8	4	0	1	0	4 (Note: Two appearances in EFL Trophy, two appearances and one goal in League Two play-offs)	1	41	9
Northampton Town	Total		71	20	5	0	1	0	8	1	85	21
Cheltenham Town	2020–21	League Two	45	8	4	0	1	0	1	0	51	8
Cheltenham Town	2021–22	League One	23	4	1	1	1	0	2	0	27	5
Cheltenham Town	Total		68	12	5	1	2	0	3	0	78	13
Walsall	2022–23	League Two	38	1	4	2	1	0	3	0	46	3
Hereford	2023–24	National League North	22	11	0	0	—		1 (Note: Appearance in FA Trophy)	0	23	11
Hereford	2024–25	National League North	44	9	3	1	—		1	0	48	10
Hereford	2025–26	National League North	45	9	2	0	—		3	1	50	10
Hereford	Total		111	29	5	1	—		5	1	121	31
Career total			737	167	48	10	23	5	48	9	853	191

== Honours ==
Hereford United

- Conference National play-offs: 2006

Doncaster Rovers

- EFL League Two third-place promotion: 2016–17

Northampton Town

- EFL League Two play-offs: 2020

Cheltenham Town

- EFL League Two: 2020–21
