= Joe Rodon =

Welsh footballer (born 1997)

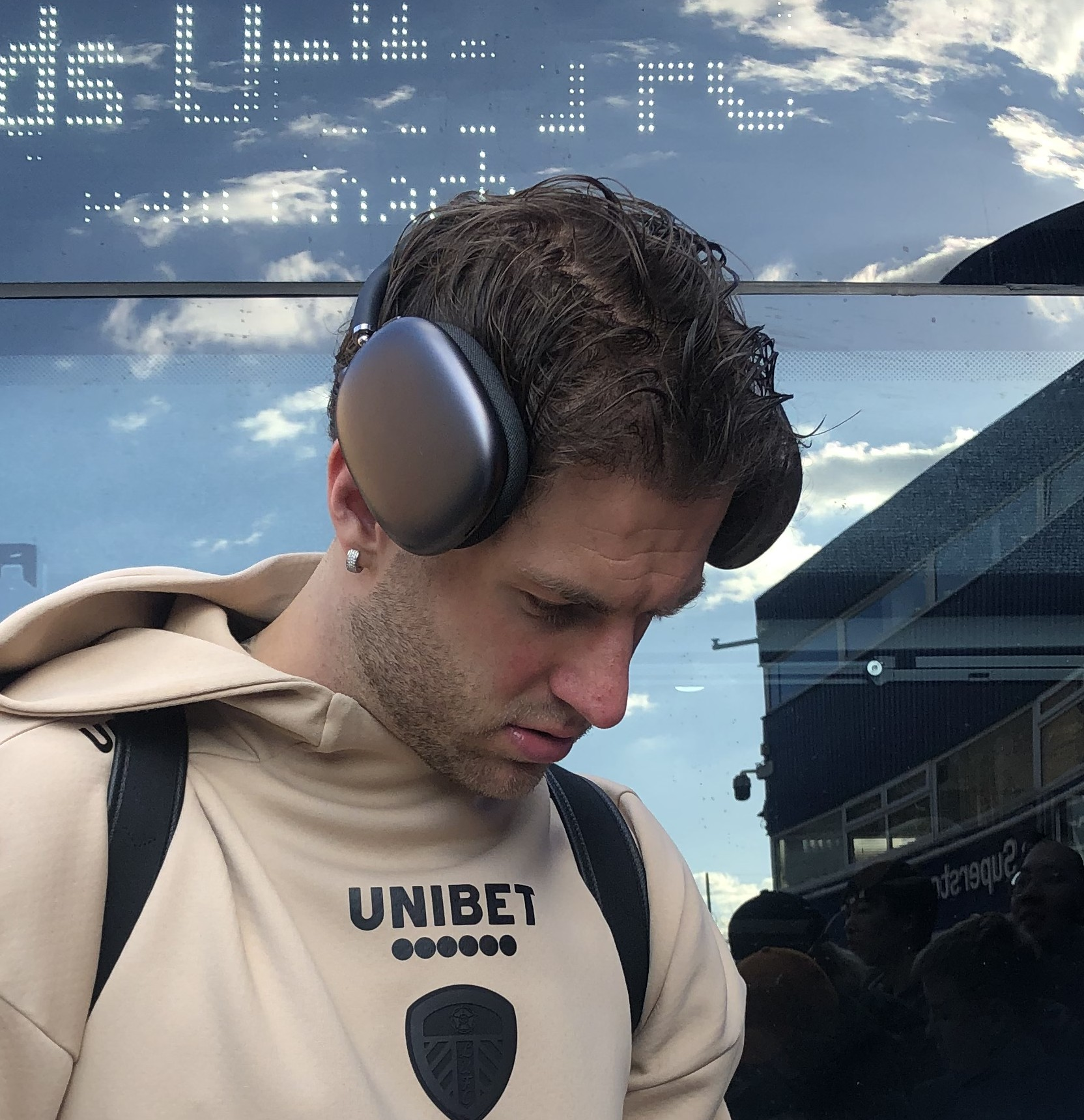
- Rodon with Leeds United in 2025

Personal information
- Full name: Joseph Peter Rodon
- Date of birth: 22 October 1997 (age 29)
- Place of birth: Swansea, Wales
- Height: 6 ft 4 in (1.93 m)
- Position: Centre-back

Team information
- Current team: Leeds United
- Number: 6

Youth career
- 2005–2015: Swansea City

Senior career*
Years	Team	Apps	(Gls)
2015–2020	Swansea City	52	(0)
2018	→ Cheltenham Town (loan)	12	(0)
2020–2024	Tottenham Hotspur	15	(0)
2022–2023	→ Rennes (loan)	16	(1)
2023–2024	→ Leeds United (loan)	43	(0)
2024–	Leeds United	81	(3)

International career^{‡}
2015	Wales U19	2	(0)
2017	Wales U20	3	(0)
2016–2018	Wales U21	9	(0)
2018–	Wales	64	(2)
- * Club domestic league appearances and goals as of 12:30, 25 May 2026 (UTC) ‡ National team caps and goals as of 22:08, 17 November 2026 (UTC)

Joseph Peter Rodon (born 22 October 1997) is a Welsh professional footballer who plays as a centre-back for Premier League club Leeds United and the Wales national team.

A youth product of Swansea City, Rodon made 54 senior appearances for the club before moving to Tottenham Hotspur in October 2020. He later moved to Leeds United on loan in August 2023, and later joined the club permanently in 2024. In 2022, Rodon helped Wales qualify for the FIFA World Cup for the first time since 1958.

== Club career ==
=== Swansea City ===
Rodon grew up in Morriston, Swansea, and went to Llangyfelach Primary School, then Pontarddulais Comprehensive School. He was a Swansea City season ticket holder before joining the club at the age of eight in 2005. He signed his first professional contract in July 2015 and was named on the first-team bench for the first time in January 2016 for the FA Cup tie with Oxford United. He was then named on the first-team bench in the Premier League game at the Emirates Stadium against Arsenal in October 2017. Rodon played as captain of Swansea's under-23 team in a 2–1 win over Cheltenham Town in the EFL Trophy on 15 August 2017.

On 30 January 2018, he joined League Two side Cheltenham Town on loan until the end of the 2017–18 season. Manager Gary Johnson said, "We have been keeping an eye on him for some time, and he is undoubtedly a quality player". He made his senior debut for the club on 3 February 2018, starting in a 1–1 draw away to Grimsby Town, and he made seven starts and five substitute appearances for the club during his loan with the club.

Swansea were relegated to the EFL Championship for the 2018–19 season, and Rodon made his debut for Swansea under new manager Graham Potter on 11 August 2018, starting in a 1–0 home win over Preston North End. He established himself as a regular starter at the club following the departure of first-team centre-backs Kyle Bartley, Ashley Williams, Federico Fernández, and Jordi Amat. On 1 November 2018, Rodon signed a new contract with Swansea, valid until summer 2022, having made 12 appearances for the club up to that point. He made 23 league appearances for the club prior to suffering a metatarsal injury in January 2019, and made 27 league appearances in total over the 2018–19 season.

He made 21 appearances the following season under new coach Steve Cooper.

=== Tottenham Hotspur ===
Rodon signed for Premier League club Tottenham Hotspur on 16 October 2020, signing a five-year contract for a reported fee of £11 million. He made his Premier League debut for Tottenham Hotspur on 26 October 2020 after coming on as a substitute for Son Heung-min in the 93rd minute in the 1–0 win away against Burnley. He made his first start for the club in the away match against Chelsea on 29 November as Toby Alderweireld was out injured, and helped keep a clean sheet in a 0–0 draw.

On 1 August 2022, Rodon joined French Ligue 1 club Stade Rennais on a year-long loan with Rennes holding the option to sign him permanenty, for a fee estimated to be €20 million.

=== Leeds United ===
On 10 August 2023, Rodon joined Leeds United on a season-long loan from Tottenham. He made his league debut for Leeds United on 12 August 2023, when he came on as a 92nd-minute substitute for Jamie Shackleton in a 1–0 defeat at Birmingham City.

On 2 July 2024, Rodon returned to Leeds United, this time on a permanent transfer for a reported fee of £10m. He scored his first goal for The Whites in a 2–0 home win on 7 December 2024 over Derby County. He has started every Championship match in the 2024–25 season. He has been a defensive duo with fellow Welsh defender Ethan Ampadu. They were recently described as a "Welsh Wall" by Leeds United Manager Daniel Farke.

Rodon played in a career-high 46 league games with Leeds during the 2024–25 season, which saw them get promoted back to the Premier League and win the EFL Championship title. He was one of just three Leeds players to appear in every league game during the 2024–25 season, along with Brenden Aaronson and Joel Piroe.

On 19 August 2026, Rodon signed a new deal with Leeds United, running through the 2029-30 season. In the 33rd minute of a home league fixture against Brentford on 30 August 2026, Rodon pulled up, unchallenged, with a hamstring injury that ruled him out of the team for eight to 10 weeks.

== International career ==
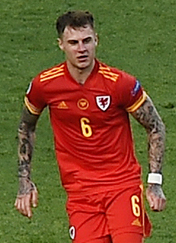
Rodon with Wales at UEFA Euro 2020

He captained Wales under-20s at the 2017 Toulon Tournament.

He was named in a preliminary senior Wales squad in May 2018 for a friendly against Mexico but was left out of the final selection. He was called up for a competitive game for the first time for a September 2019 qualifier against Azerbaijan. Rodon made his debut against Azerbaijan, playing all 90 minutes in a 2–1 win. In May 2021 he was selected for the Wales squad for the delayed UEFA Euro 2020 tournament.

In November 2022, Rodon was named in the Wales squad for the 2022 FIFA World Cup in Qatar. He went on to play every minute of Wales' campaign as the team drew with the United States and lost to Iran and England, finishing bottom of Group B.

On 6 June 2025 he scored his first goal for Wales in a 3–0 victory against Liechtenstein.

== Style of play ==
Rodon is a ball-playing centre-back, and has earned comparisons to John Stones.

== Personal life ==
Rodon's father Keri played basketball for Wales. His grandfather Peter, and his uncle Chris Rodon were also professional footballers, whilst his older brother Sam was also a graduate of the Swansea City academy, though he failed to forge a professional career.

== Career statistics ==
=== Club ===
As of match played 30 August 2026

Appearances and goals by club, season and competition
Club	Season	League			National cup (Note: Includes FA Cup, Coupe de France)		League cup (Note: Includes EFL Cup)		Europe		Other		Total	
Club	Season	Division	Apps	Goals	Apps	Goals	Apps	Goals	Apps	Goals	Apps	Goals	Apps	Goals
Swansea City	2015–16	Premier League	0	0	0	0	0	0	—		—		0	0
Swansea City	2016–17	Premier League	0	0	0	0	0	0	—		—		0	0
Swansea City	2017–18	Premier League	0	0	0	0	0	0	—		—		0	0
Swansea City	2018–19	Championship	27	0	1	0	0	0	—		—		28	0
Swansea City	2019–20	Championship	21	0	0	0	0	0	—		—		21	0
Swansea City	2020–21	Championship	4	0	—		1	0	—		—		5	0
Swansea City	Total		52	0	1	0	1	0	—		—		54	0
Swansea City U23	2016–17	—			—		—		—		4 (Note: Appearances in EFL Trophy)	0	4	0
Swansea City U23	2017–18	—			—		—		—		4	0	4	0
Swansea City U23	Total		—		—		—		—		8	0	8	0
Cheltenham Town (loan)	2017–18	League Two	12	0	—		—		—		—		12	0
Tottenham Hotspur	2020–21	Premier League	12	0	2	0	—		0	0	—		14	0
Tottenham Hotspur	2021–22	Premier League	3	0	2	0	1	0	4 (Note: Appearances in UEFA Europa Conference League)	0	—		10	0
Tottenham Hotspur	Total		15	0	4	0	1	0	4	0	—		24	0
Rennes (loan)	2022–23	Ligue 1	16	1	1	0	—		5 (Note: Appearances in UEFA Europa League)	0	—		22	1
Leeds United (loan)	2023–24	Championship	43	0	4	0	—		—		3 (Note: Appearances in Championship play-offs)	0	50	0
Leeds United	2024–25	Championship	46	1	1	0	1	0	—		—		48	1
Leeds United	2025–26	Premier League	35	2	3	0	0	0	—		—		38	2
Leeds United	2026–27	Premier League	2	0	0	0	1	0	—		—		3	0
Leeds United	Total		83	3	4	0	2	0	—		—		89	3
Career total			221	4	14	0	4	0	9	0	11	0	259	4

=== International ===
As of match played 17 November 2026

Appearances and goals by national team and year
National team	Year	Apps	Goals
Wales	2019	4	0
Wales	2020	6	0
Wales	2021	12	0
Wales	2022	11	0
Wales	2023	9	0
Wales	2024	8	0
Wales	2025	8	2
Wales	2026	6	0
Total		64	2

As of match played 6 June 2025. Wales' score listed first, score column indicates score after each Rodon goal.

List of international goals scored by Joe Rodon
No.	Date	Venue	Cap	Opponent	Score	Result	Competition
1	6 June 2025	Cardiff City Stadium, Cardiff, Wales	53	Liechtenstein	1–0	3–0	2026 FIFA World Cup qualification
2	13 October 2025	Cardiff City Stadium, Cardiff, Wales	56	Belgium	1–0	2–4	2026 FIFA World Cup qualification

== Honours ==
Swansea City U23

- Premier League Cup: 2016–17

Leeds United

- EFL Championship: 2024–25
