= 2023–24 Doncaster Rovers F.C. season =

Doncaster Rovers
2023–24 season
- Owner: Doncaster Rovers Ltd
- Chairman: Terry Bramall
- Manager: Grant McCann
- Stadium: Eco-Power Stadium
- League Two: 5th
- FA Cup: Second round
- EFL Cup: Second round
Home colours	Away colours

The 2023–24 season is the 145th season in the history of Doncaster Rovers and their second consecutive season in League Two. The club are participating in League Two, the FA Cup, the EFL Cup, and the 2023–24 EFL Trophy.

== Current squad ==
As of 31 March 2024

No.	Name	Position	Nationality	Place of birth	Date of birth (age)	Previous club	Date signed	Fee	Contract end
Goalkeepers
1	Ian Lawlor	GK	(Republic of Ireland)	Dublin	27 October 1994 (age 32)	(Scotland) Dundee	1 July 2023	Free	30 June 2025
12	Louis Jones	GK	(England)	Doncaster	12 October 1998 (age 28)	Academy	1 July 2017	Trainee	30 June 2024
15	Thimothée Lo-Tutala	GK	(France)	Gonesse	13 February 2003 (age 23)	Hull City	1 February 2024	Loan	31 May 2024
Defenders
2	Jamie Sterry	RB	(England)	Newcastle upon Tyne	21 November 1995 (age 30)	Hartlepool United	1 July 2023	Free	30 June 2025
3	James Maxwell	LB	(Scotland)	(England) Crewe	9 December 2001 (age 24)	(Scotland) Rangers	21 July 2022	Free	30 June 2026
4	Tom Anderson	CB	(England)	Burnley	2 September 1993 (age 33)	Burnley	1 July 2018	Free	30 June 2025
5	Joseph Olowu	CB	(England)	(Nigeria) Ibadan	27 November 1999 (age 26)	Arsenal	10 September 2021	Free	30 June 2025
6	Richard Wood	CB	(England)	Ossett	5 July 1985 (age 41)	Rotherham United	1 July 2023	Free	30 June 2024
16	Thomas Nixon	RB	(England)	Trentham	25 November 2002 (age 23)	Hull City	24 July 2023	Loan	31 May 2024
17	Owen Bailey	CB	(England)	Newcastle upon Tyne	22 January 1999 (age 27)	Gateshead	1 July 2023	Free	30 June 2025
23	Jack Senior	LB	(England)	Halifax	13 January 1997 (age 29)	FC Halifax Town	1 July 2023	Free	30 June 2025
25	Jay McGrath	CB	(Republic of Ireland)	(England) Doncaster	15 April 2003 (age 23)	(Republic of Ireland) St Patrick's Athletic	4 January 2024	Free	30 June 2026
28	Bobby Faulkner	CB	(England)	Doncaster	5 August 2004 (age 22)	Academy	1 July 2022	Trainee	30 June 2024
Midfielders
7	Luke Molyneux	AM	(England)	Bishop Auckland	29 March 1998 (age 28)	Hartlepool United	1 July 2022	Free	30 June 2024
8	George Broadbent	CM	(England)	Tameside	30 September 2000 (age 26)	Sheffield United	14 June 2023	Undisclosed	30 June 2025
10	Tommy Rowe	LM	(England)	Wythenshawe	24 September 1988 (age 38)	Bristol City	1 July 2021	Free	30 June 2024
11	Jon Taylor	RM	(England)	Liverpool	20 July 1992 (age 34)	Rotherham United	9 August 2019	Free	30 June 2024
14	Harrison Biggins	CM	(England)	Sheffield	15 March 1996 (age 30)	Fleetwood Town	1 July 2022	Free	30 June 2024
24	Zain Westbrooke	CM	(England)	Chertsey	28 October 1996 (age 30)	Bristol Rovers	24 March 2023	Free	30 June 2026
27	Liam Ravenhill	CM	(Northern Ireland)	Doncaster	28 November 2002 (age 23)	Academy	1 July 2021	Trainee	30 June 2025
33	Ben Close	CM	(England)	Portsmouth	8 August 1996 (age 30)	Portsmouth	1 July 2021	Free	30 June 2026
37	Matthew Craig	DM	(Scotland)	(England) Barnet	16 April 2003 (age 23)	Tottenham Hotspur	9 January 2024	Loan	31 May 2024
38	Will Flint	CM	(England)			Academy	10 October 2023	Trainee	30 June 2024
42	Sam Straughan-Brown	CM	(England)			Academy	15 August 2023	Trainee	30 June 2024
Forwards
9	George Miller	CF	(England)	Bolton	11 August 1998 (age 28)	Barnsley	1 July 2022	Free	30 June 2024
20	Joe Ironside	CF	(England)	Middlesbrough	16 October 1993 (age 33)	Cambridge United	1 July 2023	Free	30 June 2026
21	Kyle Hurst	LW	(England)	Milton Keynes	20 January 2002 (age 24)	Birmingham City	22 July 2022	Undisclosed	30 June 2025
22	Conor Carty	CF	(Republic of Ireland)	Dunlavin	25 May 2002 (age 24)	Bolton Wanderers	3 January 2024	Loan	31 May 2024
31	Caolan Lavery	CF	(Northern Ireland)	(Canada) Red Deer	22 October 1992 (age 34)	Scunthorpe United	24 January 2023	Free	30 June 2024
36	Maxime Biamou	CF	(France)	Creteil	13 November 1990 (age 35)	Dundee United	28 February 2024	Free	30 June 2024
40	Billy Waters	SS	(England)	Epsom	15 October 1994 (age 32)	(Wales) Wrexham	11 January 2024	Loan	31 May 2024
47	Hakeeb Adelakun	RW	(England)	Hackney	11 June 1996 (age 30)	Lincoln City	22 January 2024	Loan	31 May 2024
Out on Loan
18	Deji Sotona	LW	(Republic of Ireland)	Waterford	7 December 2002 (age 23)	Burnley	14 July 2023	Free	30 June 2025
19	Charlie Seaman	RB	(England)	Waltham Forest	30 September 1999 (age 27)	Bournemouth	1 October 2020	Free	30 June 2024
29	Jack Degruchy	AM	(England)	Knaresborough	13 August 2003 (age 23)	York City	28 July 2022	Free	30 June 2024
30	Tavonga Kuleya	RW	(England)	Bradford	15 June 2004 (age 22)	Academy	1 July 2022	Trainee	30 June 2024
32	Ben Bottomley	GK	(England)	Pontefract	22 October 2002 (age 24)	Academy	1 July 2021	Trainee	30 June 2024
35	Jack Goodman	CF	(England)	Nottingham	21 March 2005 (age 21)	Academy	1 July 2023	Trainee	30 June 2025

== Transfers ==
=== In ===
Date	Pos	Player	Transferred from	Fee	Ref
14 June 2023	CM	(England) George Broadbent	(England) Sheffield United	Undisclosed	
1 July 2023	CB	(England) Owen Bailey	(England) Gateshead	Free Transfer	
1 July 2023	CF	(England) Joe Ironside	(England) Cambridge United	Free Transfer	
1 July 2023	GK	(Republic of Ireland) Ian Lawlor	(Scotland) Dundee	Free Transfer	
1 July 2023	LB	(England) Jack Senior	(England) FC Halifax Town	Free Transfer	
1 July 2023	RB	(England) Jamie Sterry	(England) Hartlepool United	Free Transfer	
1 July 2023	CB	(England) Richard Wood	(England) Rotherham United	Free Transfer	
14 July 2023	LW	(Republic of Ireland) Deji Sotona	(England) Burnley	Free Transfer	
8 August 2023	GK	(England) Rory Watson	(Wales) Wrexham	Free Transfer	
4 January 2024	CB	(Republic of Ireland) Jay McGrath	(Republic of Ireland) St Patrick's Athletic	Free Transfer	
28 February 2024	CF	(France) Maxime Biamou	Free agent	—N/a	

=== Out ===
Date	Pos	Player	Transferred to	Fee	Ref
30 June 2023	CF	(England) Kieran Agard	Free agent	Released	
30 June 2023	LM	(England) Aidan Barlow	(England) Eastleigh	Released	
30 June 2023	GK	(England) Jonathan Mitchell	Free agent	Released	
30 June 2023	CB	(England) Jak Whiting	(England) Bradford (Park Avenue)	Free Transfer	
30 June 2023	CB	(Grenada) Ro-Shaun Williams	Free agent	Released	
24 August 2023	GK	(England) Rory Watson	(England) York City	Free Transfer	
10 November 2023	CF	(England) Reo Griffiths	Free agent	Mutual Consent	
1 February 2024	CB	(England) Adam Long	(England) AFC Fylde	Mutual Consent	

=== Loaned in ===
Date	Pos	Player	Loaned from	Fee	Ref
1 July 2023	RW	(Jamaica) Tyler Roberts	(England) Wolverhampton Wanderers	2 January 2024 (Note: On 2 January, Roberts' loan from Wolves ended early.)	
24 July 2023	RB	(England) Tom Nixon	(England) Hull City	End of Season	
11 August 2023	CF	(The Gambia) Modou Faal	(England) West Bromwich Albion	13 January 2024 (Note: On 13 January, Faal returned to parent club West Brom early from his season-long loan.)	
1 September 2023	SS	(England) Louie Marsh	(England) Sheffield United	10 January 2024 (Note: On 10 January, Marsh returned to Sheffied United early due to injury.)	
3 January 2024	CF	(Republic of Ireland) Conor Carty	(England) Bolton Wanderers	End of Season	
9 January 2024	DM	(Scotland) Matthew Craig	(England) Tottenham Hotspur	End of Season	
11 January 2024	SS	(England) Billy Waters	(Wales) Wrexham	End of Season	
22 January 2024	RW	(England) Hakeeb Adelakun	(England) Lincoln City	End of Season	
1 February 2024	GK	(France) Thimothée Lo-Tutala	(England) Hull City	End of Season	

=== Loaned out ===
Date	Pos	Player	Loaned to	Until	Ref
22 July 2023	AM	(England) Jack Degruchy	(England) Marske United	19 January 2024 (Note: On 19 January, Degruchy was recalled from his loan at Marske and subsequently joined Kettering on loan.)	
22 July 2023	RW	(England) Tavonga Kuleya	(England) Marske United	26 August 2023 (Note: On 26 August, Tavonga Kuleya was recalled from his season-long loan at Marske United.)	
24 July 2023	CF	(England) Jack Goodman	(England) Gainsborough Trinity	26 August 2023 (Note: On 26 August, Jack Goodman was recalled from his season-long loan at Gainsborough Trinity.)	
27 July 2023	RB	(England) Charlie Seaman	(England) Hartlepool United	5 January 2024	
8 September 2023	RW	(England) Tavonga Kuleya	(England) Sheffield	7 October 2023	
15 November 2023	CB	(England) Will Green	(England) Maltby Main	13 December 2023	
24 November 2023	LW	(Republic of Ireland) Deji Sotona	(England) Boston United	13 January 2024	
28 November 2023	GK	(England) Ben Bottomley	(England) Gainsborough Trinity	26 December 2023	
10 January 2024	RW	(England) Tavonga Kuleya	(England) Gainsborough Trinity	7 February 2024	
19 January 2024	AM	(England) Jack Degruchy	(England) Kettering Town	17 February 2024	
19 January 2024	RB	(England) Charlie Seaman	(England) Wealdstone	End of Season	
27 February 2024	CF	(England) Jack Goodman	(England) Matlock Town	End of Season	
27 February 2024	RW	(England) Tavonga Kuleya	(England) Gainsborough Trinity	End of Season	
27 March 2024	AM	(England) Jack Degruchy	(England) Matlock Town	End of Season	
28 March 2024	GK	(England) Ben Bottomley	(England) Cleethorpes Town	End of Season	

== Pre-season and friendlies ==
On 25 May, Doncaster announced their first pre-season friendly, against Rossington Main. A second friendly was confirmed on June 6, against Port Vale. A day later, a third was added, against Sheffield Wednesday. On 14 June, the club confirmed a three further friendlies, against Boston United, York City and Scunthorpe United.

Win Draw Loss Fixtures

8 July 2023 Friendly	Rossington Main	1–3	Doncaster Rovers	Rossington
15:00 BST	Hannah 6'	Report	Rowe 15'; Broadbent 54'; Miller 68'	Stadium: Oxford Street; Attendance: 1,700+

11 July 2023 Friendly	Boston United	2–3	Doncaster Rovers	Boston
19:45 BST	Ward 7'; Gyasi 83'	Report	Ironside 18', 28'; Rowe 26'	Stadium: Jakemans Community Stadium

18 July 2023 Friendly	York City	1–0	Doncaster Rovers	Huntington
19:45 BST	Kouhyar 62'	Report		Stadium: LNER Community Stadium

22 July 2023 Friendly	Scunthorpe United	0–0	Doncaster Rovers	Scunthorpe
13:00 BST		Report		Stadium: Glanford Park

25 July 2023 Friendly	Doncaster Rovers	1–0	Sheffield Wednesday	Doncaster
19:00 BST	Molyneux 72'	Report		Stadium: Eco-Power Stadium

29 July 2023 Friendly	Doncaster Rovers	1–0	Port Vale	Doncaster
15:00 BST	Broadbent 69'	Report		Stadium: Eco-Power Stadium

== Competitions ==
=== Overall record ===
Competition	Starting round	Final position	Record							
Competition	Starting round	Final position	Pld	W	D	L	GF	GA	GD	Win %
League Two	Matchday 1		27	8	4	15	31	47	−16	29.63
FA Cup	First round	Second round	3	1	1	1	5	5	+0	33.33
EFL Cup	First round	Second round	2	1	0	1	3	3	+0	50.00
EFL Trophy	Group stage	Quarter Final	6	3	1	2	10	6	+4	50.00
Total			38	13	6	19	49	61	−12	34.21

Last updated: 31 January 2024
Source: Soccerway

=== League Two ===
==== League table ====
Pos	Team	Pld	W	D	L	GF	GA	GD	Pts	Promotion, qualification or relegation
2	Wrexham (P)	46	26	10	10	89	52	+37	88	Promoted to EFL League One
3	Mansfield Town (P)	46	24	14	8	90	47	+43	86	Promoted to EFL League One
4	Milton Keynes Dons	46	23	9	14	83	68	+15	78	Qualified for League Two play-offs
5	Doncaster Rovers	46	21	8	17	73	68	+5	71	Qualified for League Two play-offs
6	Crewe Alexandra	46	19	14	13	69	65	+4	71	Qualified for League Two play-offs
7	Crawley Town (O, P)	46	21	7	18	73	67	+6	70	Qualified for League Two play-offs
8	Barrow	46	18	15	13	62	56	+6	69	

Source: EFL Official Website
Rules for classification: 1) Points; 2) Goal difference; 3) Number of goals scored; 4) Head-to-head results; 5) Wins; 6) Away goals; 7) Penalty points (sec 9.5); 8) 12-point sending off offences
(O) Play-off winners; (P) Promoted

==== Results summary ====
Overall								Home						Away					
Pld	W	D	L	GF	GA	GD	Pts	W	D	L	GF	GA	GD	W	D	L	GF	GA	GD
45	21	7	17	71	66	+5	70	14	2	7	38	30	+8	7	5	10	33	36	−3

Last updated: 23 April 2024.
Source: Soccerway

==== Results by round ====
Round	1	2	3	4	5	6	7	8	9	10	11	12	13	14	15	16	17	19	20	21	22	23	24	25	26	27	28	30	31	32	33	34	35	36	29^{2}	37	39	40	41	42	43	18^{1}	44	45	38^{3}	46
Ground	H	A	H	H	A	H	A	A	H	A	H	A	H	A	H	H	A	A	H	A	H	H	A	A	H	A	H	H	A	H	A	A	H	A	A	H	A	H	A	H	A	H	H	H	A	A
Result	L	L	D	L	L	D	L	W	W	L	W	L	W	W	L	W	L	L	W	D	L	L	L	D	W	L	L	L	D	W	D	W	W	L	D	W	W	W	W	W	W	W	W	W	W	D
Position	19	24	23	23	24	24	24	22	19	21	20	20	19	17	18	17	19	19	17	17	19	20	20	20	19	19	20	21	22	20	20	20	20	20	21	19	18	18	16	14	12	10	8	8	5	5

Updated to match(es) played on 20 April 2024. Source: Soccerway
A = Away; H = Home; W = Win; D = Draw; L = Loss; P = Postponed
Notes:
- ^{1} Matchday 18 (vs Walsall) was postponed due to the international call-ups.
- ^{2} Matchday 29 (vs Bradford City) was postponed due to a frozen pitch.
- ^{3} Matchday 38 (vs Colchester United) was postponed due to a waterlogged pitch.

==== Matches ====
On 22 June, the EFL League Two fixtures were released.

Win Draw Loss Fixtures

5 August 2023 1	Doncaster Rovers	0–1	Harrogate Town	Doncaster
15:00 BST	Lawlor (yellow card) 65'	Report	Folarin (yellow card) 53'; Muldoon 66' (pen.); Gibson (yellow card) 75'; O'Connor (yellow card) 90+7'; Odoh (yellow card) 90+8'	Stadium: Eco-Power Stadium; Attendance: 7,126; Referee: Scott Tallis

12 August 2023 2	Newport County	4–0	Doncaster Rovers	Newport
15:00 BST	Palmer-Houlden 6'; Evans 14', 49'; Wood 21' (o.g.); Jameson (yellow card) 24'; Bennett (yellow card) 61'; Lewis (yellow card) 74'; Delaney (yellow card) 81'	Report	Broadbent (yellow card) 30'; Anderson (yellow card) 32'; Roberts (yellow card) 70'; Rowe (yellow card) 72'; Sotona (yellow card) 74'; Biggins (yellow card) 85'	Stadium: Rodney Parade; Attendance: 3,989; Referee: Thomas Kirk

15 August 2023 3	Doncaster Rovers	2–2	Mansfield Town	Doncaster
19:45 BST	Nixon 20' (yellow card) 64'; Ironside 76'	Report	Reed 42'; Boateng (yellow card) 43'; Maris 80'; Clarke (yellow card) 90+3'; Swan (yellow card) 90+4'	Stadium: Eco-Power Stadium; Attendance: 7,793; Referee: Lewis Smith

19 August 2023 4	Doncaster Rovers	1–3	Notts County	Doncaster
15:00 BST	Sotona 90+5'	Report	McGoldrick (yellow card) 16'; Jones (yellow card) 18' (goal) 54'; Bostock (yellow card) 21'; Langstaff 28', 46'	Stadium: Eco-Power Stadium; Attendance: 8,485; Referee: Ben Atkinson

26 August 2023 5	Milton Keynes Dons	2–1	Doncaster Rovers	Denbigh
15:00 BST	Harvie 16'; Smith (yellow card) 25'; O'Hora 33'	Report	Senior (yellow card) 42'; Molyneux 56'	Stadium: Stadium MK; Attendance: 5,697; Referee: Andrew Kitchen

2 September 2023 6	Doncaster Rovers	0–0	Swindon Town	Doncaster
15:00 BST	Ironside (yellow card) 35'; Westbrooke (yellow card) 39'; Rowe (red card) 45'; Senior (yellow card) 62'; Lawlor (yellow card) 69'	Report	Khan (yellow card) 34'; Hutton (yellow card) 37'; Brewitt (yellow card) 67'; Austin (yellow card) 73'	Stadium: The Eco-Power Stadium; Attendance: 6,108; Referee: Edward Duckworth

9 September 2023 7	Wrexham	2–1	Doncaster Rovers	Wrexham
15:00 BST	Lee (yellow card) 21' (goal) 88'; Young 37'; O'Connor (yellow card) 79'	Report	Olowu (yellow card) 47'; Faal 52'; Senior (yellow card) 80'; Anderson (yellow card) 90+9'	Stadium: SToK Racecourse; Attendance: 10,254; Referee: Leigh Doughty

16 September 2023 8	Forest Green Rovers	1–2	Doncaster Rovers	Nailsworth
15:00 BST	Brown (yellow card) 25'; Moore-Taylor (yellow card) 51' (goal) 84'; Inniss (yellow card) 71'; McCann (yellow card) 79'	Report	Biggins 35'; Olowu (yellow card) 70'; Anderson (yellow card) 90+5'; Close 90+6'	Stadium: The Bolt New Lawn; Attendance: 1,979; Referee: Jacob Miles

23 September 2023 9	Doncaster Rovers	2–1	Gillingham	Doncaster
15:00 BST	Close 12', 87'; Biggins (yellow card) 34'; Ironside (yellow card) 90'	Report	Masterson 45+2'; Coleman (yellow card) 53'; Malone (yellow card) 90+5'	Stadium: The Eco-Power Stadium; Attendance: 6,371; Referee: Thomas Parsons

30 September 2023 10	Barrow	3–2	Doncaster Rovers	Barrow-in-Furness
15:00 BST	Warren 12' (yellow card) 22'; Garner (yellow card) 36' (goal) 53'; Gotts (yellow card) 57'; Spence (yellow card) 65'; Acquah 85'	Report	Close (yellow card) 11'; Westbrooke (yellow card) 26'; Biggins (yellow card) 32'; Ironside 56'; Faal 90+3'	Stadium: SO Legal Stadium; Attendance: 3,502; Referee: Scott Oldham

3 October 2023 11	Doncaster Rovers	2–0	Crawley Town	Doncaster
19:45 BST	Faal 27'; Bailey (yellow card) 32'; Ironside 62' (pen.); Olowu (yellow card) 65'; Westbrooke (yellow card) 71'	Report	Johnson (yellow card) 45+1'; Tsaroulla (yellow card) 45+4'; Wright (yellow card) 62'	Stadium: The Eco-Power Stadium; Attendance: 5,501; Referee: Martin Woods

7 October 2023 12	Stockport County	1–0	Doncaster Rovers	Edgeley
15:00 BST	Croasdale (yellow card) 34'; Madden (yellow card) 74'; Olaofe 83'	Report	Molyneux (yellow card) 9'	Stadium: Edgeley Park; Attendance: 9,522; Referee: Adam Herczeg

14 October 2023 13	Doncaster Rovers	4–1	Sutton United	Doncaster
15:00 BST	Ironside 17' (pen.), 52'; Rowe (yellow card) 56'; Westbrooke 63'; Faal 67'; Nixon (yellow card) 73'	Report	N'Guessan (yellow card) 29'; Kizzi (yellow card) 34'; Smith (yellow card) 90+3' (goal) 90+9'	Stadium: Eco-Power Stadium; Attendance: 6,473; Referee: Declan Bourne

20 October 2023 14	Tranmere Rovers	1–2	Doncaster Rovers	Birkenhead
19:45 GMT	Turnbull (yellow card) 11'; Jennings (yellow card) 20' (goal) 70'; Yarney (yellow card) 48'	Report	Biggins 27'; Bailey (yellow card) 38'; Faal 57'; Jones (yellow card) 90+1'	Stadium: Prenton Park; Attendance: 5,835; Referee: Ben Speedie

24 October 2023 15	Doncaster Rovers	0–3	Salford City	Doncaster
19:45 GMT		Report	Smith 1', 26', 77'; Ingram (yellow card) 40'; Mariappa (yellow card) 44'	Stadium: Eco-Power Stadium; Attendance: 5,861; Referee: Neil Hair

28 October 2023 16	Doncaster Rovers	1–0	Grimsby Town	Doncaster
15:00 GMT	Bailey (yellow card) 51'; Close (yellow card) 68'; Ironside 72' (pen.); Jones (yellow card) 80'	Report	Holohan (yellow card) 44'; Rose (yellow card) 74'	Stadium: Eco-Power Stadium; Attendance: 8,746; Referee: Darren Drysdale

11 November 2023 17	AFC Wimbledon	2–0	Doncaster Rovers	Wimbledon
15:00 GMT	Bugiel (yellow card) 23' (yellow-red card) 90+5'; Lemonheigh-Evans (yellow card) 27'; Little (yellow card) 39'; Al-Hamadi 45+2', 63'; Biler (yellow card) 56' (yellow-red card) 72'; Bass (yellow card) 90+7'	Report	Westbrooke (yellow card) 41'; Senior (yellow card) 45'	Stadium: Cherry Red Records Stadium; Attendance: 8,013; Referee: Ollie Yates

25 November 2023 19	Crewe Alexandra	3–2	Doncaster Rovers	Crewe
15:00 GMT	Offord 29'; O'Riordan 44', 90+2'; Thomas (yellow card) 90+1'	Report	Faal 16'; Maxwell (yellow card) 19'; Anderson (yellow card) 37'; Ironside 57'	Stadium: Mornflake Stadium; Attendance: 4,263; Referee: Martin Coy

28 November 2023 20	Doncaster Rovers	3–1	Colchester United	Doncaster
19:45 GMT	Maxwell 33'; Olowu (yellow card) 63'; Rowe (yellow card) 67'; Faal 73'; Ironside 87' (pen.)	Report	Hopper (yellow card) 22'; Taylor 43'; McGeehan (yellow card) 51'; Smith (yellow card) 60'; Ihionvien (yellow card) 79'	Stadium: The Eco-Power Stadium; Attendance: 5,412; Referee: Ben Toner

9 December 2023 21	Accrington Stanley	0–0	Doncaster Rovers	Accrington
15:00 GMT	Shipley (yellow card) 55'; Conneely (yellow card) 64'	Report		Stadium: Wham Stadium; Attendance: 2,501; Referee: Peter Wright

16 December 2023 22	Doncaster Rovers	0–5	Morecambe	Doncaster
15:00 GMT	Sterry (yellow card) 90+5'; Senior (yellow card) 90+5'	Report	King 7'; Tutonda (yellow card) 28' (goal) 80'; Mellon 34', 90+7'; Bedeau 51'; Connolly (yellow card) 76'; Mayor (yellow card) 90+3'	Stadium: The Eco-Power Stadium; Attendance: 6,260; Referee: Kirsty Dowle

22 December 2023 23	Doncaster Rovers	1–3	Bradford City	Doncaster
19:45 GMT	Ironside 7'; Senior (yellow card) 65'	Report	Cook 27', 85'; Smith 43'; Richards (yellow card) 90+5'	Stadium: The Eco-Power Stadium; Attendance: 8,695; Referee: Edward Duckworth

26 December 2023 24	Notts County	3–0	Doncaster Rovers	Nottingham
15:00 GMT	Crowley 33'; Langstaff 44'; Nemane 53'	Report	Ironside (penalty missed) 26'; Close (yellow card) 75'; Bailey (yellow card) 76'	Stadium: Meadow Lane; Attendance: 12,785; Referee: Lewis Smith

29 December 2023 25	Mansfield Town	1–1	Doncaster Rovers	Mansfield
19:45 GMT	Johnson 21'; Swan (yellow card) 90+2'	Report	Ironside 59'; Bailey (yellow card) 85'	Stadium: One Call Stadium; Attendance: 7,644; Referee: Scott Jackson

1 January 2024 26	Doncaster Rovers	3–0	Milton Keynes Dons	Doncaster
15:00 GMT	Molyneux 8', (yellow card) 22'; Ironside 14'; Senior (yellow card) 32'; Rowe 43'	Report	Eisa (yellow card) 45+3'; Dean (yellow card) 74'; Lewington (yellow card) 76'; Robson (yellow card) 90+5'	Stadium: The Eco-Power Stadium; Attendance: 6,151; Referee: Thomas Parsons

6 January 2024 27	Harrogate Town	3–1	Doncaster Rovers	Harrogate
15:00 GMT	Folarin 17'; Daly 66'; Odoh 74'		Rowe 19'; Sterry (yellow card) 38'; Nixon (yellow card) 77'; Olowu (yellow card) 85'	Stadium: EnviroVent Stadium; Attendance: 1,017; Referee: Sam Purkiss

13 January 2024 28	Doncaster Rovers	0–1	Newport County	Doncaster
15:00 GMT	Molyneux (yellow card) 33'	Report	Morris (yellow card) 45+1'; Wildig (yellow card) 76'; Palmer-Houlden 90+3'	Stadium: Eco-Power Stadium; Attendance: 5,889; Referee: Alex Chilowicz

27 January 2024 30	Doncaster Rovers	1–5	Stockport County	Doncaster
15:00 GMT	McGrath (yellow card) 38'; Biggins 65'; Close (yellow card) 88'	Report	Madden 5', 46', (yellow card) 57'; Bailey 10' (o.g.); Lemonheigh-Evans 33'; Olaofe 55'	Stadium: Eco-Power Stadium; Attendance: 7,469; Referee: David Rock

3 February 2024 31	Sutton United	1–1	Doncaster Rovers	Sutton
15:00 GMT	Kizzi (yellow card) 39'; Eastmond 73'; Beautyman (yellow card) 90+5'	Report	Waters (yellow card) 1'; Wood (yellow card) 36'; Broadbent (yellow card) 65'; Ironside 90+6' (pen.)	Stadium: VBS Community Stadium; Attendance: 3,021; Referee: Scott Simpson

10 February 2024 32	Doncaster Rovers	2–1	Tranmere Rovers	Doncaster
15:00 GMT	Craig (yellow card) 12'; Ironside 15'; Adelakun 64'	Report	Apter (yellow card) 42'; Jennings (yellow card) 42'; Hawkes 60'; Davies (yellow card) 71'	Stadium: Eco-Power Stadium; Attendance: 6,389; Referee: John Busby

13 February 2024 33	Salford City	2–2	Doncaster Rovers	Kersal
19:45 GMT	Wood 14' (o.g.); Watt (yellow card) 55'; Luamba (yellow card) 56'; Tilt (yellow card) 61'; Garbutt (yellow card) 63' (goal) 89'	Report	Tilt 12' (o.g.); Craig (yellow card) 64'; Adelakun 71'; Bailey (yellow card) 74'	Stadium: Peninsula Stadium; Attendance: 2,592; Referee: Martin Woods

17 February 2024 34	Grimsby Town	1–5	Doncaster Rovers	Cleethorpes
15:00 GMT	Rose 19' (pen.); Smith (yellow card) 45+4'; Clifton (yellow card) 74'	Report	Molyneux 6'; Ironside 8'; Bailey (yellow card) 28'; Maher 51' (o.g.); Craig (yellow card) 53', (goal) 72'; Hurst 82'; Sterry (yellow card) 90+3'	Stadium: Blundell Park; Attendance: 7,424; Referee: Thomas Kirk

24 February 2024 35	Doncaster Rovers	1–0	AFC Wimbledon	Doncaster
15:00 GMT	Adelakun 3'	Report	Ogundere (yellow card) 28'; Little (yellow card) 46'; Tilley (yellow card) 55'	Stadium: Eco-Power Stadium; Attendance: 6,440; Referee: Adam Herczeg

2 March 2024 36	Walsall	3–1	Doncaster Rovers	Bescot
15:00 GMT	Gordon 18'; Earing 67'; Faal 80'	Report	Hurst 62'; Maxwell (yellow card) 63'; Anderson (yellow card) 71'; Olowu (yellow card) 85'; Waters (yellow card) 89'; Sterry (yellow card) 90+2'	Stadium: Poundland Bescot Stadium; Attendance: 7,118; Referee: Sam Purkiss

5 March 2024 29	Bradford City	1–1	Doncaster Rovers	Bradford
19:45 GMT	Oduor (yellow card) 17'; Stubbs (yellow card) 28'; McDonald (yellow card) 32'; Tomkinson (yellow card) 61'; Smith 84'; Wilson (yellow card) 90+2'	Report	Maxwell (yellow card) 30'; Bailey (yellow card) 41'; Biggins (yellow card) 42'; Molyneux 45'; Lo-Tutala (yellow card) 90+4'	Stadium: Valley Parade; Attendance: 17,138; Referee: Leigh Doughty
Note: Fixture was originally scheduled for 20 January, but was postponed due to a frozen pitch.

9 March 2024 37	Doncaster Rovers	2–0	Crewe Alexandra	Doncaster
15:00 GMT	Adelakun 17'; Rowe 58'	Report	Rowe (yellow card) 37'; Adebisi (yellow card) 43'; Cooney (yellow card) 54'; Williams (yellow card) 65'	Stadium: Eco-Power Stadium; Attendance: 6,617; Referee: Craig Hicks

16 March 2024 39	Swindon Town	1–2	Doncaster Rovers	Swindon
15:00 GMT	Brewitt (yellow card) 12'; McEachran (yellow card) 30'; Devoy (yellow card) 44'; Glatzel 46'	Report	Biamou 10'; Adelakun 26'; Senior (yellow card) 50'; Lo-Tutala (yellow card) 79'; Olowu (yellow card) 84'	Stadium: The County Ground; Attendance: 7,419; Referee: Farai Hallam

23 March 2024 40	Doncaster Rovers	2–0	Forest Green Rovers	Doncaster
15:00 GMT	Anderson (yellow card) 48'; Molyneux 62'; Ironside (yellow card) 68'; Keogh 86' (o.g.)	Report	Rodríguez (yellow card) 45+1'; Thompson (yellow card) 72'	Stadium: Eco-Power Stadium; Attendance: 7,024; Referee: Anthony Backhouse

29 March 2024 41	Crawley Town	0–2	Doncaster Rovers	Crawley
15:00 GMT	Adeyemo (yellow card) 18'; Williams (yellow card) 42'; Mukena (yellow card) 90+5'	Report	Adelakun (yellow card) 45+1' (goal) 57'; Anderson (red card) 66'; Lo-Tutala (yellow card) 90+4'; Biamou 90+8'	Stadium: Broadfield Stadium; Attendance: 5,336; Referee: David Rock

2 April 2024 42	Doncaster Rovers	1–0	Wrexham	Doncaster
19:45 BST	Maxwell (yellow card) 35'; Bailey 44'; Sterry (yellow card) 74'; Ironside (yellow card) 84'	Report	Boyle (yellow card) 60'; Mullin (yellow card) 71'	Stadium: Eco-Power Stadium; Attendance: 10,537; Referee: Charles Breakspear

6 April 2024 43	Morecambe	0–3	Doncaster Rovers	Morecambe
15:00 BST	Edwards (yellow card) 39'; Taylor (yellow card) 55'	Report	Molyneux 12', 23'; Adelakun (yellow card) 68'; Craig (yellow card) 76'; Sterry (yellow card) 88'; Rowe 90+1'	Stadium: Mazuma Stadium; Attendance: 4,146; Referee: Darren Drysdale

9 April 2024 18	Doncaster Rovers	2–1	Walsall	Doncaster
19:45 BST	Ironside 39'; Adelakun (yellow card) 45+2', (goal) 77'; Biggins (yellow card) 90+2'	Report	Foulkes (yellow card) 37'; Gordon (yellow card) 65'; Hutchinson 90+3'	Stadium: Eco-Power Stadium; Attendance: 6,487; Referee: Ben Speedie
Note: Fixture was originally scheduled for 18 November, but was postponed due to international call-ups within the Walsall squad.

13 April 2024 44	Doncaster Rovers	4–0	Accrington Stanley	Doncaster
15:00 BST	Adelakun 6'; Ironside 21'; Maxwell 60', (yellow card) 78'; Bailey 71'	Report	Whalley (yellow card) 29'; Pritchard (yellow card) 90+7'	Stadium: Eco-Power Stadium; Attendance: 6,990; Referee: Ross Joyce

20 April 2024 45	Doncaster Rovers	4–2	Barrow	Doncaster
15:00 BST	Westbrooke (yellow card) 10'; Molyneux (yellow card) 53'; Ironside 58' (pen.), 90+9'; Adelakun 84'; Biggins 88'; Broadbent (yellow card) 90+7'	Report	Acquah 35'; Feely 45+1'; Newby (yellow card) 79'	Stadium: Eco-Power Stadium; Attendance: 10,251; Referee: Carl Brook

23 April 2024 38	Colchester United	1–4	Doncaster Rovers	Colchester
19:45 BST	Fevrier 9'; Iandolo (yellow card) 13'; Harbottle (yellow card) 75'	Report	Molyneux 14'; Sterry (yellow card) 17'; Biggins 22', (yellow card) 73'; Ironside (yellow card) 45+3', (goal) 85'; Anderson 76'	Stadium: Colchester Community Stadium; Attendance: 4,041; Referee: Paul Howard
Note: Fixture was originally scheduled for 12 March, but was postponed due to a waterlogged pitch.

27 April 2024 46	Gillingham	2–2	Doncaster Rovers	Gillingham
15:00 BST	Andrews (yellow card) 13'; Dieng 57'; Anderson 62' (o.g.); Ehmer (yellow card) 71'	Report	Ironside 30'; Molyneux 37'; Lo-Tutala (red card) 55'; Craig (yellow card) 77'	Stadium: Priestfield Stadium; Attendance: 8,723; Referee: Alex Chilowicz

==== Play-offs ====
Doncaster finished 5th in the regular 2023–24 EFL League Two season, so were drawn against 6th placed Crewe Alexandra in the Play-off Semi-Final. The first leg, which Doncaster won 2–0, took place at Gresty Road and the second leg took place at the Eco-Power Stadium. Crewe won the second leg 2–0, making the aggregate score 2–2, and then won a penalty shoot-out 4–3 to reach the final for promotion to EFL League One.

6 May 2024 Semi-Final First leg	Crewe Alexandra	0–2	Doncaster Rovers	Crewe
17:30 BST		Report	Molyneux 34'; Biggins 48'	Stadium: Gresty Road; Attendance: 8,220; Referee: Sunny Singh Gill

10 May 2024 Semi-Final Second leg	Doncaster Rovers	0–2 (a.e.t.) (2–2 agg.) (3–4 p)	Crewe Alexandra	Doncaster
20:00 BST	Demetriou 6'; Maxwell 16' (o.g.)	Report		Stadium: Eco-Power Stadium; Attendance: 12,889; Referee: Scott Oldham
	Penalties
	Ironside (penalty scored); Westbrooke (penalty missed); Miller (penalty scored); Bailey (penalty scored); Adelakun (penalty missed)		(penalty scored) Baker-Richardson; (penalty missed) Demetriou; (penalty scored) Cooney; (penalty scored) Leigh; (penalty scored) Kirk

=== FA Cup ===
Rovers were drawn at home to Accrington Stanley in the first round and away to Peterborough United in the second round.

Win Draw Loss Fixtures

4 November 2023 First round	Doncaster Rovers	2–2	Accrington Stanley	Doncaster
15:00 GMT	Faal 8'; Anderson (yellow card) 45+1'; Nixon (yellow card) 52'; Biggins 81'	Report	Woods (yellow card) 27'; Hills (yellow card) 29'; Whalley 74'; Conneely 84'; Leigh (yellow card) 90+1'	Stadium: Eco-Power Stadium; Attendance: 3,226; Referee: Alan Young

14 November 2023 First round replay	Accrington Stanley	1–2 (a.e.t.)	Doncaster Rovers	Accrington
19:45 GMT	Pritchard 7'; Gubbins (yellow card) 13'; Conneely (yellow card) 62'; J. Woods (yellow card) 90'; Shipley (yellow card) 110'; B. Woods (yellow card) 115'	Report	Faal (yellow card) 11'; Westbrooke 67'; Ironside 101'	Stadium: Wham Stadium; Attendance: 1,136; Referee: Scott Tallis

2 December 2023 Second round	Peterborough United	2–1	Doncaster Rovers	Peterborough
15:00 GMT	Burrows 3'; Mason-Clark 53'	Report	Anderson (yellow card) 33'; Olowu (yellow card) 42'; Maxwell (yellow card) 59'; Faal 75'	Stadium: Weston Homes Stadium; Attendance: 5,495; Referee: Ben Speedie

=== EFL Cup ===
Doncaster were drawn away to Hull City in the first round and at home to Everton in the second round.

Win Draw Loss Fixtures

8 August 2023 First round	Hull City	1–2	Doncaster Rovers	Kingston upon Hull
19:45 BST	Estupiñán 3'; Traoré (yellow card) 43'; McLoughlin (yellow card) 67'	Report	Sotona (yellow card) 9'; Broadbent (yellow card) 14'; Miller 15', 61'; Bailey (yellow card) 29'; Lawlor (yellow card) 77'; Anderson (yellow card) 88'	Stadium: MKM Stadium; Attendance: 6,577; Referee: Simon Mather

30 August 2023 Second round	Doncaster Rovers	1–2	Everton	Doncaster
20:00 BST	Ironside 44'; Roberts (yellow card) 85'	Report	Beto 73'; Danjuma 88'	Stadium: Eco-Power Stadium; Attendance: 11,430; Referee: Tom Reeves
Note: Live on Sky Sports

=== EFL Trophy ===
In the group stage, Doncaster were drawn into Northern Group H, alongside Burton Albion, Mansfield Town and Everton U21. After topping the group, they were drawn at home to Nottingham Forest U21 in the second round, and Wigan Athletic in the third round and away to Bradford City in the quarter-finals.

Pos	Div	Team	Pld	W	PW	PL	L	GF	GA	GD	Pts	Qualification
1	L2	Doncaster Rovers	3	2	0	0	1	6	4	+2	6	Advance to Round 2
2	L1	Burton Albion	3	2	0	0	1	5	3	+2	6	Advance to Round 2
3	L2	Mansfield Town	3	1	0	0	2	4	5	−1	3	
4	ACA	Everton U21	3	1	0	0	2	1	4	−3	3	

Updated to match(es) played on 7 November 2023. Source: EFL.com

Win Draw Loss Fixtures

19 September 2023 Group stage	Doncaster Rovers	2–0	Everton U21	Doncaster
19:00 BST	Marsh 57'; Biggins 81'		Kouyate (yellow card) 6'; Campbell (yellow card) 26'	Stadium: The Eco-Power Stadium; Attendance: 1,067; Referee: Ross Joyce

10 October 2023 Group stage	Mansfield Town	3–2	Doncaster Rovers	Mansfield
19:00 BST	Gale 11' (pen.), 13'; Macdonald (yellow card) 19'; Brunt (yellow card) 45+8'; Cargill (yellow card) 49'; Johnson 88'	Report	Sotona (yellow card) 26'; Close 38'; Flint (yellow card) 52'; Ironside 64'; Westbrooke (yellow card) 66'; Molyneux (yellow card) 71'	Stadium: One Call Stadium; Attendance: 1,486; Referee: Ruebyn Ricardo

7 November 2023 Group stage	Doncaster Rovers	2–1	Burton Albion	Doncaster
19:15 GMT	Faal 18'; Hurst 55'; Biggins (yellow card) 75'; Senior (yellow card) 77'; Anderson (yellow card) 90+2'	Report	Gilligan (yellow card) 12'; Gordon (yellow card) 45'; Lubala 84'; Seddon (yellow card) 89'	Stadium: Eco-Power Stadium; Attendance: 1,068; Referee: Matthew Corlett

5 December 2023 Second round	Doncaster Rovers	3–0	Nottingham Forest U21	Doncaster
19:00 GMT	Bailey (yellow card) 28'; Biggins (yellow card) 30'; Molyneux 43'; Hurst 74'; Ironside 85'	Report	Larsson (yellow card) 24'; McConnell (yellow card) 57'; Powell (yellow card) 75'; Norkett (yellow card) 82'	Stadium: Eco-Power Stadium; Attendance: 1,252; Referee: Simon Mather

16 January 2024 Third round	Doncaster Rovers	1–1 (4–2 p)	Wigan Athletic	Doncaster
19:00 GMT	Bailey 70'; Taylor (yellow card) 90'	Report	Wyke 11'; Smith (yellow card) 26'; Shaw (yellow card) 83'	Stadium: Eco-Power Stadium; Attendance: 1,530; Referee: Ollie Yates
	Penalties
	Ironside (penalty scored); Close (penalty scored); Bailey (penalty scored); Hurst (penalty scored)		Magennis (penalty scored); Humphrys (penalty scored); Hughes (penalty missed); Jones (penalty missed)

30 January 2024 Quarter-final	Bradford City	1–0	Doncaster Rovers	Bradford
	Chapman 58'	Report		Stadium: University of Bradford Stadium; Attendance: 3,086; Referee: Will Finnie
