= 2024–25 Doncaster Rovers F.C. season =

146th season in existence of Doncaster Rovers FC

Doncaster Rovers
2024–25 season
- Owner: Doncaster Rovers Limited
- Chairman: Terry Bramall
- Manager: Grant McCann
- Stadium: Eco-Power Stadium
- League Two: 1st (promoted)
- FA Cup: Fourth round
- EFL Cup: Second round
- EFL Trophy: Round of 32
- Top goalscorer: League: Luke Molyneux (16); All: Luke Molyneux (18)
Home colours

The 2024–25 season was the 146th season in the history of Doncaster Rovers Football Club and their third consecutive season in League Two. In aditition to the domestic league, the club participated in the FA Cup, the EFL Cup, and the EFL Trophy. The club finished in first place in the league, earning promotion back to League One for the first time since the 2021–22 season.

== Transfers ==
=== In ===
Date	Pos.	Player	From	Fee	Ref.
14 June 2024 (Note: The transfer was announced on 11 June, and would become official on June 14 once the transfer window re-opened)	RB	Tom Nixon (ENG)	Hull City (ENG)	Undisclosed	
1 July 2024 (Note: The transfer was announced on 2 June, and would become official on July 1 once his Grimsby Town contract expired)	CM	Harry Clifton (WAL)	Grimsby Town (ENG)	Free	
1 July 2024 (Note: The transfer was announced on 27 May, and would become official on July 1 once his Carlisle United contract expired)	RM	Jordan Gibson (ENG)	Carlisle United (ENG)	Free	
1 July 2024 (Note: The transfer was announced on 20 May, and would become official on July 1 once his Solihull Moors contract expired)	AM	Joe Sbarra (ENG)	Solihull Moors (ENG)	Free	
1 July 2024 (Note: The transfer was announced on 24 June, and would become official on July 1 once his Hull City contract expired)	CF	Billy Sharp (ENG)	Hull City (ENG)	Free	
6 September 2024	RB	Josh Emmanuel (ENG)	Carlisle United (ENG)	Free	

=== Out ===
Date	Pos.	Player	To	Fee	Ref.
25 June 2024	LW	Deji Sotona (IRL)	Eastleigh (ENG)	Undisclosed	
9 August 2024	CF	George Miller (ENG)	Cheltenham Town (ENG)	Undisclosed	
7 February 2025	GK	Louis Jones (ENG)	Dagenham & Redbridge (ENG)	Undisclosed	

=== Loaned in ===
Date	Pos.	Player	From	Date until	Ref.
14 June 2024 (Note: The loan was announced on 13 June, and would officially commence on 14 June.)	GK	Teddy Sharman-Lowe (ENG)	Chelsea (ENG)	End of season	
14 June 2024 (Note: The transfer was announced on 11 June, and would officially commence on 14 June.)	CF	Ephraim Yeboah (ITA)	Bristol City (ENG)	1 January 2025 (Note: On 28 December, it was confirmed that Yeboah would return to his parent club Bristol City as the club opted not to continue with the loan.)	
8 August 2024	CM	Patrick Kelly (NIR)	West Ham United (ENG)	End of season	
15 August 2024	LB	Brandon Fleming (ENG)	Hull City (ENG)	9 January 2025 (Note: On 9 January, Fleming was recalled to his parent club Hull)	
3 January 2025	CF	Rob Street (ENG)	Lincoln City (ENG)	End of season	
10 January 2025	RW	Ethan Ennis (ENG)	Manchester United (ENG)	End of season	
14 January 2025	DM	Charlie Crew (WAL)	Leeds United (ENG)	End of season	

=== Loaned out ===
Date	Pos.	Player	To	Date until	Ref.
1 July 2024	CB	Bobby Faulkner (ENG)	Dundalk (IRL)	30 November 2024	
26 July 2024	CF	Jack Goodman (ENG)	Peterborough Sports (ENG)	14 November 2024 (Note: On 12 September, Goodman's loan at Peterborough Sports was extended until January) (Note: On 14 November, Goodman was recalled from his loan at Peterborough Sports and subsequently loaned to Bradford PA)	
26 July 2024	GK	Louis Jones (ENG)	Waterford (IRL)	30 November 2024	
31 July 2024	CM	Freddie Allen (ENG)	Bridlington Town (ENG)	7 September 2024	
31 July 2024	AM	Jack Degruchy (ENG)	Hanley Town (ENG)	7 September 2024	
1 August 2024	RW	Tavonga Kuleya (ENG)	Truro City (ENG)	6 December 2024 (Note: On 12 September, Kuleya's loan at Truro was extended until January, but then on December 6, he was recalled)	
9 August 2024	CM	Will Flint (ENG)	Darlington (ENG)	29 March 2025 (Note: On 7 January, Flint's loan at Darlington was extended until the end of season, However, on 29 March, Flint was recalled)	
5 October 2024	CB	Freddie Allen (ENG)	Grantham Town (ENG)	End of Season (Note: On 16 January, Allen's loan at Grantham was extended until the end of season)	
14 November 2024	CF	Jack Goodman (ENG)	Bradford (Park Avenue) (ENG)	5 February 2025 (Note: On 8 January, Goodman's loan at Bradford (Park Avenue) was extended until the end of season, However, on 5 February he was recalled and subsequently joined Basford on loan)	
3 December 2024	GK	Jake Oram (ENG)	Matlock Town (ENG)	31 December 2024	
6 December 2024	RW	Tavonga Kuleya (ENG)	Belper Town (ENG)	End of season	
17 January 2025	CB	Bobby Faulkner (ENG)	Buxton (ENG)	End of season	
1 February 2025	CM	Ben Close (ENG)	Eastleigh (ENG)	End of season	
3 February 2025	LW	Kyle Hurst (ENG)	Queen's Park (SCO)	End of season	
5 February 2025	CF	Jack Goodman (ENG)	Basford United (ENG)	End of season	
28 February 2025	CM	Sam Straughan-Brown (ENG)	Peterborough Sports (ENG)	29 March 2025	

=== Released / Out of Contract ===
Date	Pos.	Player	Subsequent club	Join date	Ref.
30 June 2024	CM	Harrison Biggins (ENG)	Shrewsbury Town (ENG)	1 July 2024	
30 June 2024	GK	Ben Bottomley (ENG)	North Ferriby (ENG)	1 July 2024	
30 June 2024	RB	Charlie Seaman (ENG)	Maidstone United (ENG)	1 July 2024	
30 June 2024	CM	Liam Ravenhill (NIR)	Buxton (ENG)	9 July 2024	
30 June 2024	RM	Jon Taylor (ENG)	Salford City (ENG)	20 July 2024	
30 June 2024	CF	Maxime Biamou (FRA)			
30 June 2024	LM	Tommy Rowe (ENG)			
30 June 2024	CF	Caolan Lavery (NIR)	Retired		

== Pre-season and friendlies ==
On June 7, Doncaster confirmed their first two pre-season friendlies against Middlesbrough and Stamford. Three days later, the club confirmed a double-header with the squad being split for two fixtures against Darlington and Spennymoor Town. On 12 June, a further two friendlies were later added, against Hull City and Rotherham United.

Win Draw Loss Fixtures

16 July 2024 Friendly	Stamford	0–4	Doncaster Rovers	Stamford
19:00 BST		Report	Sharp 15'; Hurst 82'; Gibson 88', 110'	Stadium: Zeeco Stadium
Note: 2x 60 minute halves

20 July 2024 Friendly	Darlington	0–1	Doncaster Rovers	Darlington
12:30 BST		Report	Hedley 50' (o.g.)	Stadium: Blackwell Meadows

20 July 2024 Friendly	Spennymoor Town	0–2	Doncaster Rovers	Spennymoor
15:00 BST		Report	Gibson 15'; Hurst 27'	Stadium: The Brewery Field; Attendance: 813

23 July 2024 Friendly	Doncaster Rovers	4–0	Hull City	Doncaster
19:45 BST	Hurst 22'; Ironside 28'; Bailey 54', 60'	Report		Stadium: Eco-Power Stadium

27 July 2024 Friendly	Doncaster Rovers	3–5	Middlesbrough	Doncaster
14:00 BST	Molyneux 40'; Sharp 48' (pen.); Ironside 71'	Report	Hackney 24'; Azaz 50'; McGree 54'; Latte Lath 64'; Finch 82'	Stadium: Eco-Power Stadium; Referee: James Bell

3 August 2024 Friendly	Rotherham United	0–0	Doncaster Rovers	Doncaster
15:00 BST		Report		Stadium: Eco-Power Stadium
Note: Richard Wood's testimonial match

8 October 2024 Friendly	Doncaster Rovers	1–1	Scunthorpe United	Wokingham
13:00 BST	Yeboah	Report	Whitehall	Stadium: Cantley Park; Attendance: 0 (Behind closed doors)

27 November 2024 Friendly	Doncaster Rovers	2–3	Rotherham United	Doncaster
	Clifton 2', 55'	Report	32'; 36'; 39'	Stadium: Eco-Power Stadium; Attendance: 0 (Behind closed doors)

== Competitions ==
=== League Two ===
==== League table ====
Pos	Team	Pld	W	D	L	GF	GA	GD	Pts	Promotion, qualification or relegation
1	Doncaster Rovers (C, P)	46	24	12	10	73	50	+23	84	Promotion to EFL League One
2	Port Vale (P)	46	22	14	10	65	46	+19	80	Promotion to EFL League One
3	Bradford City (P)	46	22	12	12	64	45	+19	78	Promotion to EFL League One
4	Walsall	46	21	14	11	75	54	+21	77	Qualification for League Two play-offs
5	AFC Wimbledon (O, P)	46	20	13	13	56	35	+21	73	Qualification for League Two play-offs

Source: EFL Official Website
Rules for classification: 1) Points; 2) Goal difference; 3) Number of goals scored; 4) Head-to-head results; 5) Wins; 6) Away goals; 7) Penalty points (sec 9.5); 8) 12-point sending off offences
(C) Champions; (O) Play-off winners; (P) Promoted

==== Results summary ====
Overall								Home						Away					
Pld	W	D	L	GF	GA	GD	Pts	W	D	L	GF	GA	GD	W	D	L	GF	GA	GD
46	24	12	10	73	50	+23	84	12	7	4	38	23	+15	12	5	6	35	27	+8

Last updated: 3 May 2025.
Source: Soccerway

==== Results by round ====
Round	1	2	3	4	5	6	7	8	9	10	11	12	13	14	15	16	17	18	19	20	21	22	23	24	25	27	28	29	30	31	32	26^{1}	33	34	35	36	37	39	40	41	42	38^{2}	43	44	45	46
Ground	H	A	H	A	H	A	A	H	H	A	H	A	H	A	H	H	A	A	H	A	H	A	A	H	H	A	H	A	H	A	H	A	A	H	A	H	A	H	H	A	H	A	A	H	H	A
Result	W	L	W	W	W	L	D	L	W	W	D	W	L	W	D	D	D	W	D	L	W	L	D	W	L	W	W	W	W	L	L	W	W	W	L	D	D	W	D	W	D	D	W	W	W	W
Position	1	9	6	5	1	6	6	7	5	4	2	2	4	4	4	3	3	3	3	5	5	3	4	3	7	6	3	2	2	3	6	3	2	3	3	3	4	4	4	4	4	3	2	1	1	1
Points	3	3	6	9	12	12	13	13	16	19	20	23	23	26	27	28	29	32	33	33	36	36	37	40	40	43	46	49	52	52	52	55	58	61	61	62	63	66	67	70	71	72	75	78	81	84

Source: EFL
A = Away; H = Home; W = Win; D = Draw; L = Loss; P = Postponed
Notes:
- ^{1} Matchday 26 (vs. Morecambe) was postponed due to FA Cup involvements.
- ^{2} Matchday 38 (vs. Salford City) was postponed due to international call-ups.

==== Matches ====
On 26 June, the League Two fixtures were announced.

Win Draw Loss Fixtures

10 August 2024 1	Doncaster Rovers	4–1	Accrington Stanley	Doncaster
15:00 BST	Molyneux 43', 62'; Gibson 68'; Sharp 87'	Report	Walton 47'; Knowles (yellow card) 70'; O’Brien (yellow card) 85'	Stadium: Eco-Power Stadium; Attendance: 6423; Referee: Ross Joyce

17 August 2024 2	Newport County	3–1	Doncaster Rovers	Newport
15:00 BST (UTC+1)	Glennon (yellow card) 17'; Baker-Richardson 47'; Whitmore 66'; Baker 69'	Report	Bailey (yellow card) 5' (goal) 30'; Senior (yellow card) 64'	Stadium: Rodney Parade; Attendance: 4,755; Referee: Scott Simpson

24 August 2024 3	Doncaster Rovers	1–0	Morecambe	Doncaster
15:00 BST	Clifton 20'; Fleming (yellow card) 38'	Report	Tutonda (yellow card) 62'; Songo'o (yellow card) 66'; Slew (yellow card) 73'; Hendrie (yellow card) 87'	Stadium: Eco-Power Stadium; Attendance: 6,823; Referee: Scott Tallis

31 August 2024 4	Port Vale	2–3	Doncaster Rovers	Stoke-on-Trent
12:30 BST	Croasdale 30'; Chislett 87' (pen.)	Report	Molyneux 16', 58'; Sharp 46'; Yeboah (yellow card) 90+6'	Stadium: Vale Park; Attendance: 5,454; Referee: Adam Herczeg
Note: Fixture was initially scheduled for a 15:00 kick-off, but was moved for live Sky Sports broadcast.

7 September 2024 5	Doncaster Rovers	1–0	Gillingham	Doncaster
15:00 BST	Sharp 30'; Sterry (yellow card) 39'	Report	Nevitt (yellow card) 50'	Stadium: Eco-Power Stadium; Attendance: 7,546; Referee: Thomas Parsons

12 September 2024 6	Harrogate Town	2–0	Doncaster Rovers	Harrogate
20:00 BST	Taylor 27', (yellow card) 88'; O'Connor (yellow card) 45'; March 45+1'; Muldoon (yellow card) 86'	Report	Fleming (yellow card) 25'; McGrath (yellow card) 58'; Clifton (yellow card) 75'	Stadium: Wetherby Road; Attendance: 3,123; Referee: Thomas Kirk
Note: Fixture was initially scheduled for 14 September, but was moved for live Sky Sports broadcast.

21 September 2024 7	Milton Keynes Dons	1–1	Doncaster Rovers	Milton Keynes
15:00 GMT	Harrison 34', (red card) 52'; Nemane (yellow card) 36'; Gilbey (yellow card) 90+3'	Report	Clifton (yellow card) 3' (yellow-red card) 10'; Yeboah (yellow card) 66'; Anderson 82'	Stadium: Stadium MK; Attendance: 7,838; Referee: Simon Mather

28 September 2024 8	Doncaster Rovers	0–3	Chesterfield	Doncaster
15:00 GMT	Fleming (yellow card) 17'; McGrath (yellow card) 41'; Molyneux (yellow card) 45+4' (yellow-red card) 49'; Yeboah (yellow card) 79'; Anderson (red card) 85'	Report	Dunkley 31'; Madden (yellow card) 38', (goal) 59' (pen.); Berry (yellow card) 75', (goal) 90+5'	Stadium: Eco-Power Stadium; Attendance: 10,790; Referee: James Bell

1 October 2024 9	Doncaster Rovers	1–0	Barrow	Doncaster
19:45 GMT	Clifton 81'	Report	Campbell (yellow card) 46'; Acquah (yellow card) 90+1'	Stadium: Eco-Power Stadium; Attendance: 5,632; Referee: Farai Hallam

5 October 2024 10	Grimsby Town	0–3	Doncaster Rovers	Cleethorpes
12:30 BST	Hume (yellow card) 24'; Green (yellow card) 36'; Rodgers (red card) 45'	Report	Gibson 2', 44'; Molyneux 10'	Stadium: Blundell Park; Attendance: 7,693; Referee: Edward Duckworth
Note: Fixture was initially scheduled for a 15:00 kick-off, but was moved for live Sky Sports broadcast.

12 October 2024 11	Doncaster Rovers	1–1	Crewe Alexandra	Doncaster
15:00 BST	Hurst 73'	Report	Cooney (yellow card) 30'; Tabiner (yellow card) 40'; Conway 56'; Thibaut (yellow card) 76'	Stadium: Eco-Power Stadium; Attendance: 7,472; Referee: Ben Atkinson

19 October 2024 12	Swindon Town	1–2	Doncaster Rovers	Swindon
15:00 BST	Clarke (yellow card) 28'; Butterworth (yellow card) 38'; Smith 75'; Freckleton (yellow card) 90+4'	Report	Sharp (yellow card) 51'; Olowu 58'; Kelly (yellow card) 77'; Ironside 90+4' (pen.)	Stadium: County Ground; Attendance: 6,837; Referee: Craig Hicks

22 October 2024 13	Doncaster Rovers	0–1	Bromley	Doncaster
19:45 BST	Sharp (yellow card) 90'	Report	Thompson 20'; Grant (yellow card) 42'; Imray (yellow card) 45+3'; Odutayo (yellow card) 71'; Jenkinson (yellow card) 80'	Stadium: Eco-Power Stadium; Attendance: 6,309; Referee: Zac Kennard-Kettle

26 October 2024 14	Bradford City	1–2	Doncaster Rovers	Bradford
15:00 BST	Shepherd (yellow card) 6'; Diabate (yellow card) 36'; Cook 83'; Kavanagh (yellow card) 90+5'	Report	Sharp (yellow card) 6', (goal) 66'; Hurst (yellow card) 13'; Maxwell (yellow card) 36'; Molyneux 57'; Broadbent (yellow card) 86'; Bailey (yellow card) 90+5'	Stadium: Valley Parade; Attendance: 18,269; Referee: Ruebyn Ricardo

9 November 2024 15	Doncaster Rovers	1–1	Notts County	Doncaster
15:00 GMT	Ironside 73'	Report	Jatta 13'; Bedeau (yellow card) 80'; Tsaroulla (yellow card) 86'; Brown (yellow card) 90+3'	Stadium: Eco-Power Stadium; Attendance: 10,988; Referee: Tom Reeves

16 November 2024 16	Doncaster Rovers	1–1	Salford City	Doncaster
15:00 GMT	Sharman-Lowe (yellow card) 23'; Bailey (yellow card) 38'; Hurst (yellow card) 49'; Sharp 77'	Report	N'Mai (yellow card) 23'; Ashley (yellow card) 42'; Kouassi 50'	Stadium: Eco-Power Stadium; Attendance: 7,280; Referee: Martin Woods

23 November 2024 17	Carlisle United	0–0	Doncaster Rovers	Carlisle
15:00 GMT	Mellish (yellow card) 60'	Report	Maxwell (yellow card) 5'; Molyneux (yellow card) 31'; McGrath (yellow card) 45+1' (yellow-red card) 90+6'	Stadium: Brunton Park; Attendance: 6,837; Referee: James Oldham

4 December 2024 18	Fleetwood Town	2–4	Doncaster Rovers	Fleetwood
19:45 GMT	Bolton (yellow card) 19'; Helm 34'; Graydon 42'	Report	Anderson (yellow card) 9'; Hurst 13'; Bailey 49'; Sharp 45+3'; Sterry (yellow card) 54'; Bolton 68' (o.g.); Sharman-Lowe (yellow card) 90+3'	Stadium: Highbury Stadium; Referee: Adam Herczeg

7 December 2024 19	Doncaster Rovers	2–2	Cheltenham Town	Doncaster
15:00 GMT	McGrath (yellow card) 26'; Hurst (yellow card) 34'; Broadbent 55'; Molyneux 75'	Report	Bailey 15' (o.g.); Archer 56'; Kinsella (yellow card) 65'	Stadium: Eco-Power Stadium; Attendance: 6,259; Referee: Scott Simpson

14 December 2024 20	AFC Wimbledon	1–0	Doncaster Rovers	Wimbledon
15:00 GMT	Hutchinson (yellow card) 8'; Stevens 27'; Kelly (yellow card) 57'; Bugiel (yellow card) 80'	Report	Bailey (yellow card) 66'; McGrath (yellow card) 76'; Sharp (yellow card) 80'; Senior (yellow card) 88'; Clifton (yellow card) 90+4'	Stadium: Plough Lane; Attendance: 7,862; Referee: David Rock

21 December 2024 21	Doncaster Rovers	3–1	Tranmere Rovers	Doncaster
12:30 GMT	Olowu 38'; Bailey (yellow card) 46'; Kelly 66'; Hurst 77'	Report	Wood (yellow card) 17'; Davies (yellow card) 24'; Finley (yellow card) 45+1'; Solomon 83'	Stadium: Eco-Power Stadium; Attendance: 7,201; Referee: Alex Chilowicz
Note: Fixture was initially scheduled for a 15:00 kick-off, but was moved for live Sky Sports broadcast.

26 December 2024 22	Walsall	2–0	Doncaster Rovers	Bescot
15:00 GMT	Lowe 47'; Barrett (yellow card) 59'; Williams 79'; Gordon (yellow card) 88'	Report	Fleming (yellow card) 11'	Stadium: Bescot Stadium; Attendance: 7,220; Referee: Oliver Mackey

29 December 2024 23	Colchester United	1–1	Doncaster Rovers	Colchester
15:00 GMT	Taylor (yellow card) 45', (goal) 51'; McDonnell (yellow card) 45+1'; Thorn (yellow card) 60'; Iandolo (yellow card) 90+1'	Report	Sterry (yellow card) 32'; Gibson 40', (yellow card) 69' (yellow-red card) 80'; Bailey (yellow card) 42'	Stadium: Colchester Community Stadium; Attendance: 5,729; Referee: James Durkin

1 January 2025 24	Doncaster Rovers	2–1	Fleetwood Town	Doncaster
15:00 GMT	Bailey 44'; Sharp 90+2'	Report	Virtue 62'	Stadium: Eco-Power Stadium; Attendance: 7,290; Referee: Declan Bourne

4 January 2025 25	Doncaster Rovers	1–2	Port Vale	Doncaster
15:00 GMT	Kelly (yellow card) 48'; Street 84'	Report	Croasdale 33', (yellow card) 51'; Tolaj 61'	Stadium: Eco-Power Stadium; Attendance: 8,438; Referee: Jeremy Simpson

18 January 2025 27	Gillingham	0–1	Doncaster Rovers	Gillingham
12:30 GMT	Little (yellow card) 6'	Report	Olowu (yellow card) 17'; Molyneux 33', (yellow card) 90+1'; Street (yellow card) 70'; Broadbent (yellow card) 90'	Stadium: Priestfield Stadium; Attendance: 5,814; Referee: Lee Swabey
Note: Fixture was initially scheduled for a 15:00 kick-off, but was moved for live Sky Sports broadcasting.

25 January 2025 28	Doncaster Rovers	1–0	Harrogate Town	Doncaster
15:00 GMT	Clifton 86'	Report	Moon (yellow card) 74'; Belshaw (yellow card) 84'	Stadium: Eco-Power Stadium; Attendance: 7,241; Referee: Richard Eley

29 January 2025 29	Barrow	1–3	Doncaster Rovers	Barrow-in-Furness
20:00 GMT	Acquah 45+5'; Smith (yellow card) 58'; Duru (yellow card) 60'; Campbell (yellow card) 90+4'	Report	Clifton (yellow card) 5'; Crew (yellow card) 9'; Olowu 28'; Molyneux 29', 78'	Stadium: Holker Street; Attendance: 3,009; Referee: Seb Stockbridge
Note: Fixture was initially scheduled for 28 January, but was moved for live Sky Sports broadcasting.

1 February 2025 30	Doncaster Rovers	2–1	Milton Keynes Dons	Doncaster
15:00 GMT	Ironside 31'; Street 73'	Report	Hogan 58'; Sanders (yellow card) 70'; Hendry (yellow card) 76'; Tomlinson (yellow card) 84'	Stadium: Eco-Power Stadium; Attendance: 6,871; Referee: Zac Kennard-Kettle

6 February 2025 31	Chesterfield	5–2	Doncaster Rovers	Chesterfield
19:45 GMT	Duffy 11'; Dobra (yellow card) 29'; Pepple 37', 59'; Olakigbe 54'; Sparkes (yellow card) 84'; Banks 90+4'	Report	Molyneux (yellow card) 42', (goal) 45+4'; Crewe (yellow card) 56'; Sterry (yellow card) 68'; McGrath (yellow card) 75'; Ironside 90+3'	Stadium: SMH Group Stadium; Attendance: 8,707; Referee: Greg Rollason
Note: Fixture was initially scheduled for 8 February, but was rearranged due to FA Cup involvements.

15 February 2025 32	Doncaster Rovers	1–2	Grimsby Town	Doncaster
12:30 GMT	Molyneux (yellow card) 82'; Street 85'	Report	Obikwu 38'; Olowu 47' (o.g.); Rose (yellow card) 51'	Stadium: Eco-Power Stadium; Attendance: 9,961; Referee: Martin Coy
Note: Fixture was initially scheduled for a 15:00 kick-off, but was moved for live Sky Sports broadcasting.

18 February 2025 26	Morecambe	0–1	Doncaster Rovers	Morecambe
19:45 GMT	Dackers (yellow card) 8'; Lewis (yellow card) 72'	Report	Street 3'; Bailey (yellow card) 67'; Senior (red card) 70'; Clifton (yellow card) 82'	Stadium: Mazuma Mobile Stadium; Attendance: 2,951; Referee: Oliver Yates
Note: Fixture was originally scheduled for 11 January, but was postponed due to FA Cup involvements.

22 February 2025 33	Accrington Stanley	1–2	Doncaster Rovers	Accrington
15:00 GMT	O'Brien (yellow card) 45'; Conneely 57', (yellow card) 71'; J. Woods (yellow card) 79'; Whalley (yellow card) 79'; B. Woods (yellow card) 80'	Report	Clifton 2'; Street (yellow card) 36'; Ward 61' (o.g.); Bailey (yellow card) 80'; Kelly (red card) 89'; Sharman-Lowe (yellow card) 90+6'	Stadium: Crown Ground; Attendance: 2,258; Referee: Stuart Morland

1 March 2025 34	Doncaster Rovers	3–0	Newport County	Doncaster
15:00 GMT	Street 34', 46'; Molyneux 78'	Report	Antwi (yellow card) 84'	Stadium: Eco-Power Stadium; Attendance: 8,007; Referee: Darren Drysdale

4 March 2025 35	Bromley	1–0	Doncaster Rovers	Bromley
19:45 GMT	Elerewe 10', (yellow card) 58'	Report	Broadbent (yellow card) 9'; Street (yellow card) 17'; Clifton (yellow card) 19'	Stadium: Hayes Lane; Attendance: 2,433; Referee: Bobby Madley

8 March 2025 36	Doncaster Rovers	2–2	Swindon Town	Doncaster
15:00 GMT	Street 1'; Sbarra 22'; Molyneux (yellow card) 83'	Report	Butterworth 50'; Westley 51'; Freckleton (yellow card) 83'	Stadium: Eco-Power Stadium; Attendance: 7,440; Referee: Leigh Doughty

15 March 2025 37	Crewe Alexandra	1–1	Doncaster Rovers	Crewe
12:30 GMT				Stadium: Gresty Road
Note: Fixture was initially scheduled for a 15:00 kick-off, but was moved for live Sky Sports broadcasting.

29 March 2025 39	Doncaster Rovers	3–0	Carlisle United	Doncaster
15:00 GMT	Broadbent (yellow card) 13'; Bailey 36'; Gibson 68'; Sterry (yellow card) 69'; Clifton 73'	Report		Stadium: Eco-Power Stadium; Attendance: 8,299; Referee: Scott Oldham

1 April 2025 40	Doncaster Rovers	2–2	Walsall	Doncaster
19:45 BST				Stadium: Eco-Power Stadium

5 April 2025 41	Cheltenham Town	0–2	Doncaster Rovers	Cheltenham
12:30 BST	Dieng (yellow card) 30' (yellow-red card) 56'; Backwell (yellow card) 33'	Report	Wood (yellow card) 45+1'; Sbarra (yellow card) 88'; Sterry 89'; Street 90+5'	Stadium: Whaddon Road; Attendance: 3,897; Referee: Carl Brook
Note: Fixture was initially scheduled for a 15:00 kick-off, but was moved for live Sky Sports broadcasting.

12 April 2025 42	Doncaster Rovers	1–1	AFC Wimbledon	Doncaster
12:30 BST	Sharp (red card) 72'; Sterry 79'	Report	Smith 5'; Harbottle (yellow card) 22'; Reeves (red card) 28'; Tilley (yellow card) 40'	Stadium: Eco-Power Stadium; Attendance: 8,733; Referee: Neil Hair
Note: Fixture was initially scheduled for a 15:00 kick-off, but was moved for live Sky Sports broadcasting.

15 April 2025 38	Salford City	1–1	Doncaster Rovers	Kersal
19:45 BST	Garbutt (yellow card) 19', (goal) 27'; Tilt (yellow card) 22' (yellow-red card) 90+4'; Woodburn (yellow card) 45+1'; Lund (yellow card) 65'	Report	Street 21'; Anderson (yellow card) 26'; Maxwell (yellow card) 75'	Stadium: Moor Lane; Attendance: 3,030; Referee: Elliot Bell
Note: Fixture was initially scheduled for 22 March, but was moved postponed due to international call-ups.

18 April 2025 43	Tranmere Rovers	0–3	Doncaster Rovers	Birkenhead
15:00 BST	Dennis (yellow card) 32'	Report	Molyneux 23', 51', 77'; Clifton (yellow card) 28'; Bailey (yellow card) 55'; Anderson (yellow card) 89'	Stadium: Prenton Park; Attendance: 8,814; Referee: Scott Tallis

21 April 2025 44	Doncaster Rovers	3–0	Colchester United	Doncaster
15:00 BST	Clifton 9'; Gibson 22'; Senior (yellow card) 51'; Kelly 90+1'	Report	Edwards (yellow card) 25' (yellow-red card) 80'; Lisbie (yellow card) 61'; Iandolo (yellow card) 70'	Stadium: Eco-Power Stadium; Attendance: 8,936; Referee: Alan Young

26 April 2025 45	Doncaster Rovers	2–1	Bradford City	Doncaster
12:30 BST	Broadbent (yellow card) 6'; Street 33'; Sharp 90+1'	Report	Sarcevic (yellow card) 20'; Baldwin (yellow card) 45+3' (yellow-red card) 45+3'; Wright (penalty missed) 85'; Crichlow 90+4'	Stadium: Eco-Power Stadium; Attendance: 12,574; Referee: Ross Joyce
Note: Fixture was initially scheduled for a 15:00 kick-off, but was moved for live Sky Sports broadcasting.

3 May 2025 46	Notts County	1–2	Doncaster Rovers	Nottingham
15:00 BST	Jatta 90+5'	Report	Street 18', 28', (yellow card) 44'	Stadium: Meadow Lane; Attendance: 15,427; Referee: Adam Herczeg

=== FA Cup ===
Doncaster Rover were drawn away to Barrow in the first round, to Kettering Town in the second round, to Hull City in the third round and then at home against Crystal Palace in the fourth round.

Win Draw Loss Fixtures

2 November 2024 First round	Barrow	0–1	Doncaster Rovers	Barrow-in-Furness
15:00 GMT	Garner (yellow card) 18'; Eccleston (yellow card) 39'; Newby (yellow card) 71'	Report	Kelly 83'	Stadium: Holker Street; Attendance: 2,605; Referee: Dale Baines

1 December 2024 Second round	Kettering Town	1–2 (a.e.t.)	Doncaster Rovers	Burton Latimer
12:00 GMT	Noel-Williams 30'; Sordell (yellow card) 109'	Report	Sharp 75', 105'; Hurst (yellow card) 81'; Broadbent (yellow card) 90+5'	Stadium: Latimer Park; Attendance: 2,803; Referee: Ben Speedie

12 January 2025 Third round	Hull City	1–1 (a.e.t.) (4–5 p)	Doncaster Rovers	Kingston upon Hull
12:00 GMT	Giles (yellow card) 55'; Puerta 80'	Report	Olowu (yellow card) 36'; McGrath (yellow card) 45'; Molyneux 51'; Sbarra (yellow card) 57'; Clifton (yellow card) 65'; Bailey (yellow card) 78'; Sharman-Lowe (yellow card) 83'; Sterry (yellow card) 89'	Stadium: MKM Stadium; Attendance: 10,032; Referee: Sunny Singh Gill
	Penalties
	João Pedro (penalty scored); McLoughlin (penalty scored); Coyle (penalty scored); Slater (penalty scored); Burstow (penalty missed); Jones (penalty missed)		(penalty missed) Ironside; (penalty scored) Sterry; (penalty scored) Gibson; (penalty scored) Close; (penalty scored) Molyneux; (penalty scored) Clifton

10 February 2025 Fourth round	Doncaster Rovers	0–2	Crystal Palace	Doncaster
19:45 GMT		Report	Muñoz 32'; Devenny 55'	Stadium: Eco-Power Stadium; Attendance: 12,739; Referee: Farai Hallam

=== EFL Cup ===
On 27 June, the draw for the first round was made, with Doncaster being drawn away against Salford City. In the second round, they were drawn away to Everton.

Win Draw Loss Fixtures

13 August 2024 First round	Salford City	0–2	Doncaster Rovers	Salford
19:45 BST	Chesters (yellow card) 39'; Chester (yellow card) 62'; Negru (yellow card) 83'; N'Mai (yellow card) 90+2'; Edwards (yellow card) 90+5'	Report	Sharp 21'; Senior (yellow card) 59'; Yeboah (yellow card) 70'; Molyneux 90+1'	Stadium: Moor Lane; Attendance: 1,328; Referee: Seb Stockbridge

27 August 2024 Second round	Everton	3–0	Doncaster Rovers	Liverpool
19:45 BST	McNeil 53'; Iroegbunam (yellow card) 58'; Young (yellow card) 69'; Ndiaye 74'; Beto 83'	Report	Senior (yellow card) 38'	Stadium: Goodison Park; Attendance: 37,245; Referee: James Bell

=== EFL Trophy ===
In the group stage, Doncaster were drawn into Northern Group F alongside Barnsley, Huddersfield Town and Manchester United U21. In the round of 32, Doncaster were drawn at home to Port Vale.

==== Group stage ====
Pos	Div	Team	Pld	W	PW	PL	L	GF	GA	GD	Pts	Qualification
1	L2	Doncaster Rovers	3	2	0	1	0	8	5	+3	7	Advance to Round 2
2	L1	Huddersfield Town	3	2	0	0	1	7	3	+4	6	Advance to Round 2
3	ACA	Manchester United U21	3	1	1	0	1	7	9	−2	5	
4	L1	Barnsley	3	0	0	0	3	3	8	−5	0	

Source: EFL

Win Draw Loss Fixtures

3 September 2024 Group stage	Doncaster Rovers	2–1	Huddersfield Town	Doncaster
19:00 BST	Yeboah 37'; Sbarra (yellow card) 47'; Ironside 83' (pen.)	Report	Ward 49'; Turton (yellow card) 51'; Lonwijk (yellow card) 55'	Stadium: Eco-Power Stadium; Attendance: 2,319; Referee: Declan Bourne

24 September 2024 Group stage	Doncaster Rovers	3–3 (3–5 p)	Manchester United U21	Doncaster
19:00 GMT	Williams (yellow card) 8'; Sbarra 24'; Hurst (yellow card) 35'; Yeboah 50'; Sharp (yellow card) 53'; Broadbent 65', (yellow card) 82'	Report	Mather 11'; Ennis 72'; Wheatley (yellow card) 78'; Jackson 90+6'	Stadium: Eco-Power Stadium; Referee: Aaron Bannister
	Penalties
	Ironside (penalty scored); Molyneux (penalty scored); Broadbent (penalty missed); Gibson (penalty scored)		(penalty scored) Mather; (penalty scored) Wheatley; (penalty scored) Fletcher; (penalty scored) Amass; (penalty scored) Biancheri (penalty scored)

29 October 2024 Group stage	Barnsley	1–3	Doncaster Rovers	Barnsley
19:00 GMT	Bland (yellow card) 45'; Marsh 78'	Report	Ironside 45+1'; Anderson (yellow card) 47'; Fleming (yellow card) 67'; Clifton 72'; Hurst 84'	Stadium: Oakwell; Attendance: 1,813; Referee: Elliot Bell

==== Knockout stages ====
10 December 2024 Round of 32	Doncaster Rovers	0–1	Port Vale	Doncaster
19:00 GMT	Gibson (yellow card) 80'	Report	Harper 90+2'; John (yellow card) 90+5'	Stadium: Eco-Power Stadium; Attendance: 1,396; Referee: Paul Marsden

== Statistics ==
=== Appearances and goals ===
As of match played 26 April 2025

Players with no appearances are not included on the list
Italics indicate a loaned in player

No.	Pos	Nat	Player	Total		League Two		FA Cup		EFL Cup		EFL Trophy	
No.	Pos	Nat	Player	Apps	Goals	Apps	Goals	Apps	Goals	Apps	Goals	Apps	Goals
1	GK	(Republic of Ireland) IRL	Ian Lawlor	5	0	0+0	0	0+0	0	1+0	0	4+0	0
2	DF	(England) ENG	Jamie Sterry	46	2	39+1	2	4+0	0	0+1	0	1+0	0
3	DF	(Scotland) SCO	James Maxwell	26	0	19+4	0	3+0	0	0+0	0	0+0	0
4	DF	(England) ENG	Tom Anderson	32	1	23+5	1	2+0	0	0+0	0	2+0	0
5	DF	(England) ENG	Joseph Olowu	39	3	27+4	3	4+0	0	2+0	0	2+0	0
6	DF	(England) ENG	Richard Wood	8	0	7+1	0	0+0	0	0+0	0	0+0	0
7	FW	(England) ENG	Luke Molyneux	54	18	43+1	16	4+0	1	1+1	1	0+4	0
8	MF	(England) ENG	George Broadbent	45	2	27+10	1	3+1	0	0+2	0	2+0	1
9	FW	(England) ENG	Rob Street	23	10	14+7	10	2+0	0	0+0	0	0+0	0
10	MF	(England) ENG	Joe Sbarra	34	2	7+19	1	2+0	0	1+1	0	4+0	1
11	MF	(England) ENG	Jordan Gibson	51	6	31+10	6	1+3	0	1+1	0	2+2	0
14	FW	(England) ENG	Billy Sharp	50	12	19+23	9	4+0	2	1+1	1	1+1	0
15	MF	(Wales) WAL	Harry Clifton	46	7	26+14	6	0+3	0	1+0	0	1+1	1
16	DF	(England) ENG	Tom Nixon	12	0	2+6	0	0+1	0	2+0	0	1+0	0
17	MF	(England) ENG	Owen Bailey	53	5	45+0	5	4+0	0	1+1	0	0+2	0
18	FW	(England) ENG	Ethan Ennis	16	0	3+11	0	1+1	0	0+0	0	0+0	0
19	GK	(England) ENG	Teddy Sharman-Lowe	50	0	45+0	0	4+0	0	1+0	0	0+0	0
20	FW	(England) ENG	Joe Ironside	49	6	17+22	4	0+4	0	1+1	0	3+1	2
21	FW	(England) ENG	Kyle Hurst	28	4	9+12	3	1+1	0	0+1	0	2+2	1
22	MF	(Northern Ireland) NIR	Patrick Kelly	38	3	15+15	2	1+2	1	2+0	0	3+0	0
23	DF	(England) ENG	Jack Senior	29	0	15+6	0	2+1	0	2+0	0	3+0	0
24	MF	(England) ENG	Zain Westbrooke	9	0	2+4	0	0+0	0	2+0	0	0+1	0
25	DF	(Republic of Ireland) IRL	Jay McGrath	40	0	30+3	0	2+0	0	2+0	0	2+1	0
27	MF	(Wales) WAL	Charlie Crew	12	0	10+2	0	0+0	0	0+0	0	0+0	0
33	MF	(England) ENG	Ben Close	11	0	3+4	0	0+1	0	0+0	0	3+0	0
34	DF	(England) ENG	Josh Emmanuel	9	0	3+2	0	0+1	0	0+0	0	3+0	0
37	MF	(England) ENG	Sam Straughan-Brown	2	0	0+0	0	0+0	0	0+0	0	0+2	0
40	MF	(England) ENG	Kasper Williams	2	0	0+0	0	0+0	0	0+0	0	1+1	0
Players who featured whilst on loan but returned to parent club on loan during the season:
18	FW	(Italy) ITA	Ephraim Yeboah	15	2	1+10	0	0+0	0	1+0	0	2+1	2
27	DF	(England) ENG	Brandon Fleming	20	0	12+5	0	0+1	0	0+0	0	2+0	0
