= George Broadbent (footballer) =

English footballer (born 2000)

Personal information
- Full name: George Broadbent
- Date of birth: 30 September 2000 (age 26)
- Place of birth: Tameside, England
- Height: 6 ft 2 in (1.88 m)
- Position: Midfielder

Team information
- Current team: Doncaster Rovers
- Number: 8

Youth career
- 2005–2010: Curzon Ashton
- –2017: Manchester United
- 2017–2020: Sheffield United

Senior career*
Years	Team	Apps	(Gls)
2020–2023	Sheffield United	0	(0)
2020	→ Curzon Ashton (loan)	5	(1)
2021	→ Beerschot (loan)	2	(0)
2021–2022	→ Rochdale (loan)	21	(1)
2022–2023	→ Boreham Wood (loan)	36	(5)
2023–	Doncaster Rovers	116	(2)
- * Club domestic league appearances and goals as of 1 May 2026 (UTC)

George Broadbent (born 30 September 2000) is an English professional footballer who plays as a midfielder for EFL League One club Doncaster Rovers.

== Career ==
=== Sheffield United ===
Broadbent played for the youth teams of Curzon Ashton from 2005 to 2010. He joined Sheffield United in July 2017 after playing in the youth academy of Manchester United. In January 2020, he rejoined National League North side Curzon Ashton on loan. On 11 January 2021, he joined Belgian First Division A side Beerschot on loan until the end of the season. Six days later, he made his professional debut, coming on as a substitute for the final minutes in a 3–0 loss to Club Brugge.

On 3 August 2021, Broadbent joined Rochdale on loan until January.

On 23 September 2022, Broadbent joined National League club Boreham Wood on a short-term loan deal. In January 2023, the loan was extended until the end of the season.

=== Doncaster Rovers ===
On 2 June 2023, Broadbent signed for Doncaster Rovers for an undisclosed fee manager Grant McCann looked to bolster the club’s midfield options.

Broadbent quickly established himself as a regular in the Rovers’ midfield following his arrival. In his first season he made over 30 league appearances in EFL League Two, playing primarily as a central midfielder and contributing to the team’s tempo and transitional play.

Broadbent’s role evolved as he was deployed in a deeper midfield position, where his physical presence, passing range and defensive awareness were key components of Doncaster’s balanced side. His performances drew praise for consistency and adaptability as the club pursued promotion

Broadbent scored his first league goal for Doncaster in a 2–2 League Two draw with Cheltenham Town at the Eco-Power Stadium. With the score level early in the second half, he struck from around 20 yards out after a corner was cleared only as far as him, rifling a powerful effort off the inside of the post and into the net to restore parity for Doncaster.

In recognition of his contributions, Doncaster Rovers triggered a contract extension option and, in summer 2025, Broadbent signed a new long-term deal tying him to the club until at least summer 2027, with an additional option year also included.

Entering the 2025–26 season in League One, Broadbent continued as a first-team regular, adapting his game to the higher level and producing key passes and midfield stability as Doncaster competed in the third tier.

== Career statistics ==
As of match played 8 March 2025

Appearances and goals by club, season and competition
Club	Season	League			Cup		League Cup		Other		Total	
Club	Season	Division	Apps	Goals	Apps	Goals	Apps	Goals	Apps	Goals	Apps	Goals
Sheffield United	2019–20	Premier League	0	0	0	0	0	0	—		0	0
Sheffield United	2020–21	Premier League	0	0	0	0	0	0	—		0	0
Sheffield United	2021–22	Championship	0	0	0	0	0	0	—		0	0
Sheffield United	2022–23	Championship	0	0	0	0	0	0	—		0	0
Sheffield United	Total		0	0	0	0	0	0	0	0	0	0
Curzon Ashton (loan)	2019–20	National League North	5	1	0	0	—		—		5	1
Beerschot (loan)	2020–21	Belgian First Division A	2	0	0	0	—		—		2	0
Rochdale (loan)	2021–22	League Two	21	1	2	0	1	0	3 (Note: Appearances in EFL Trophy)	0	27	1
Boreham Wood (loan)	2022–23	National League	38	5	5	2	—		3 (Note: 2 appearances in National League play-offs and 1 appearance in FA Trophy)	0	46	7
Doncaster Rovers	2023–24	League Two	32	0	3	0	2	0	6	0	43	0
Doncaster Rovers	2024–25	League Two	38	1	4	0	2	0	2	1	36	2
Doncaster Rovers	2025–26	League One	39	1	3	0	0	0	5	0	47	1
Doncaster Rovers	2026–27	League One	7	0	0	0	2	0	2	0	11	0
Career total			126	8	14	2	5	0	14	1	159	11

== Honours ==
Doncaster Rovers

- EFL League Two: 2024–25
