= Joseph Olowu =

Nigerian footballer (born 1999)

- Olowu playing for Leyton Orient in 2026

Personal information
- Full name: Joseph Olugbenga Olowu
- Date of birth: 27 November 1999 (age 26)
- Place of birth: Ibadan, Nigeria
- Position: Centre-back

Team information
- Current team: Leyton Orient
- Number: 5

Youth career
- 2008–2021: Arsenal

Senior career*
| Years | Team | Apps | (Gls) |
| 2019–2021 | Arsenal | 0 | (0) |
| 2020 | → Cork City (loan) | 15 | (1) |
| 2021 | → Wealdstone (loan) | 13 | (0) |
| 2021–2025 | Doncaster Rovers | 121 | (8) |
| 2025–2026 | Stockport County | 31 | (2) |
| 2026– | Leyton Orient | 13 | (1) |
- * Club domestic league appearances and goals as of 12:05, 22 November 2026 (UTC)

Joseph Olugbenga Olowu (born 27 November 1999) is a Nigerian professional footballer who plays as a centre-back for EFL League One club Leyton Orient.

== Early and personal life ==
Olowu was born in Ibadan, Nigeria, moving to England as a child. He is eligible to represent both England and Nigeria at international level.

== Career ==
=== Arsenal ===
Olowu began his career with Arsenal at the age of 8, spending time on loan at Cork City in 2020, and Wealdstone in 2021. He left Arsenal at the end of the 2020–21 season (after 13 years with the club) and went on trial with Manchester United.

=== Doncaster Rovers ===
In September 2021, Olowu joined League One side Doncaster Rovers following a successful trial period, signing a contract until January 2022.

In May 2023, Olowu signed a new two-and-a-half year contract.

Following their title-winning campaign, Olowu rejected a new contract with Doncaster Rovers at the end of the 2024–25 season.

=== Stockport County ===
In June 2025 it was announced that Olowu would sign for Stockport County on 1 July 2025 on a free transfer, signing a three-year contract.

=== Leyton Orient ===
On 21 July 2026, Olowu signed for Leyton Orient for an undisclosed fee.

== Career statistics ==
As of match played 21 November 2026

Appearances and goals by club, season and competition
| Club | Season | League | | | National Cup | | League Cup | | Other | | Total | |
| Club | Season | Division | Apps | Goals | Apps | Goals | Apps | Goals | Apps | Goals | Apps | Goals |
|---|---|---|---|---|---|---|---|---|---|---|---|---|
| Arsenal | 2019–20 | Premier League | 0 | 0 | 0 | 0 | 0 | 0 | 0 | 0 | 0 | 0 |
| Arsenal | 2020–21 | Premier League | 0 | 0 | 0 | 0 | 0 | 0 | 0 | 0 | 0 | 0 |
| Arsenal | Total | | 0 | 0 | 0 | 0 | 0 | 0 | 0 | 0 | 0 | 0 |
| Cork City (loan) | 2020 | League of Ireland Premier Division | 15 | 1 | 1 | 0 | 0 | 0 | 0 | 0 | 16 | 1 |
| Wealdstone (loan) | 2020–21 | National League | 13 | 0 | 0 | 0 | 0 | 0 | 0 | 0 | 13 | 0 |
| Doncaster Rovers | 2021–22 | League One | 35 | 4 | 1 | 0 | 0 | 0 | 2 (Note: Appearance(s) in the EFL Trophy.) | 0 | 38 | 4 |
| Doncaster Rovers | 2022–23 | League Two | 17 | 1 | 0 | 0 | 1 | 0 | 1 | 0 | 19 | 1 |
| Doncaster Rovers | 2023–24 | League Two | 38 | 0 | 2 | 0 | 2 | 0 | 6 | 0 | 48 | 0 |
| Doncaster Rovers | 2024–25 | League Two | 31 | 3 | 4 | 0 | 2 | 0 | 2 | 0 | 39 | 3 |
| Doncaster Rovers | Total | | 121 | 8 | 7 | 0 | 5 | 0 | 11 | 0 | 144 | 8 |
| Stockport County | 2025–26 | League One | 31 | 2 | 2 | 0 | 1 | 0 | 7 | 0 | 41 | 2 |
| Leyton Orient | 2026–27 | League One | 13 | 1 | 1 | 0 | 3 | 0 | 2 | 0 | 19 | 1 |
| Career total | | | 193 | 12 | 11 | 0 | 9 | 0 | 20 | 0 | 233 | 12 |

== Honours ==
Doncaster Rovers

- EFL League Two: 2024–25

Stockport County

- EFL Trophy runner-up: 2025–26

Individual

- EFL League Two Community Player of the Year: 2024–25
