= Tom Nixon (footballer, born 2002) =

English footballer (born 2002)

Personal information
- Full name: Thomas George Joseph Nixon
- Date of birth: 20 February 2002 (age 24)
- Height: 6 ft 1 in (1.85 m)
- Position: Right-back

Team information
- Current team: Doncaster Rovers
- Number: 16

Youth career
- Stoke City
- 2021–2022: Hull City

Senior career*
Years	Team	Apps	(Gls)
2022–2024	Hull City	0	(0)
2022	→ Boston United (loan)	4	(0)
2023	→ Boston United (loan)	15	(1)
2023–2024	→ Doncaster Rovers (loan)	25	(1)
2024–	Doncaster Rovers	26	(0)
- * Club domestic league appearances and goals as of 13:21, 22 November 2026 (UTC)

Thomas George Joseph Nixon (born 25 November 2002) is an English professional footballer who plays as a right-back for EFL League One club Doncaster Rovers.

== Career ==
Nixon began his career with Stoke City and Hull City, and spent a loan spell in non-league at Boston United, before moving on loan to Doncaster Rovers in July 2023. In June 2024 he returned to Doncaster on a three-year contract, for an undisclosed transfer fee.

== Career statistics ==
As of match played on 21 November 2026

Appearances and goals by club, season and competition
Club	Season	League			FA Cup		EFL Cup		Other		Total	
Club	Season	Division	Apps	Goals	Apps	Goals	Apps	Goals	Apps	Goals	Apps	Goals
Hull City	2022–23	Championship	0	0	0	0	0	0	0	0	0	0
Hull City	2023–24	Championship	0	0	0	0	0	0	0	0	0	0
Hull City	Total		0	0	0	0	0	0	0	0	0	0
Boston United (loan)	2022–23	National League North	19	1	0	0	0	0	1 (Note: Appearance in the FA Trophy)	0	20	1
Doncaster Rovers (loan)	2023–24	League Two	25	1	3	0	0	0	4 (Note: Appearance(s) in the EFL Trophy)	0	32	1
Doncaster Rovers	2024–25	League Two	9	0	1	0	2	0	1	0	13	0
Doncaster Rovers	2025–26	League One	14	0	0	0	3	1	6	0	23	1
Doncaster Rovers	2026–27	League One	3	0	1	0	0	0	2	0	6	0
Doncaster Rovers	Total		26	0	2	0	5	1	9	0	42	1
Career total			70	2	5	0	5	1	14	0	94	3

== Honours ==
Doncaster Rovers

- EFL League Two: 2024–25
