= Brandon Fleming (footballer) =

English footballer (born 1999)

Personal information
- Full name: Brandon James Fleming
- Date of birth: 3 December 1999 (age 26)
- Place of birth: Kingston upon Hull, England
- Height: 5 ft 9 in (1.75 m)
- Positions: Left-back; left wing-back

Team information
- Current team: Derry City
- Number: 19

Youth career
- 2008–2017: Hull City

Senior career*
Years	Team	Apps	(Gls)
2017–2025	Hull City	31	(0)
2018	→ Gainsborough Trinity (loan)	3	(0)
2020	→ Bolton Wanderers (loan)	10	(0)
2023	→ Oxford United (loan)	14	(0)
2023–2024	→ Shrewsbury Town (loan)	8	(0)
2024–2025	→ Doncaster Rovers (loan)	17	(0)
2025	→ Forest Green Rovers (loan)	9	(0)
2025–	Derry City	44	(1)
- * Club domestic league appearances and goals as of 12:22, 9 November 2026 (UTC)

Brandon James Fleming (born 3 December 1999) is an English professional footballer who plays as a left-back or left wing-back for League of Ireland Premier Division side Derry City.

== Club career ==
=== Hull City ===
Fleming joined Hull City at the age of nine and signed a scholarship in July 2016. He signed his first professional deal in February 2017 after impressing for the Under-18s. On 22 August 2017, he made his debut in a 2–0 EFL Cup defeat to Doncaster Rovers. On 30 November 2020, Fleming signed a new two-and-a-half-year deal with the club. On 9 July 2022, Fleming signed a three-year contract extension, with the club holding an option for a further year.

==== Gainsborough Trinity (loan) ====
Fleming joined Gainsborough Trinity on 27 February 2018 on an initial month's loan.

==== Bolton Wanderers (loan) ====
He signed with League One club Bolton Wanderers on a six-month loan on 17 January 2020.

==== Oxford United (loan) ====
Fleming signed with League One club Oxford United on a six-month loan on 6 January 2023. He made 14 League appearances, and an FA Cup appearance as a late substitute in a third-round defeat to Arsenal, before returning to his parent club at the end of the season.

==== Shrewsbury Town (loan) ====
On 1 September 2023, Fleming joined League One club Shrewsbury Town on loan until the end of the season. On 2 February 2024, Fleming returned to Hull City.

==== Doncaster Rovers (loan) ====
Fleming joined League Two side Doncaster Rovers on a season-long loan in August 2024. He was recalled in January 2025.

==== Forest Green Rovers (loan) ====
On 14 February 2025, Fleming joined National League side Forest Green Rovers on loan until the end of the season.

=== Derry City ===
On 17 July 2025, Fleming joined League of Ireland Premier Division side Derry City on an eighteen-month contract. On 17 December 2025, he signed a new three-year contract to keep him at the club until the end of the 2028 season. On 8 November 2026, he was part of the starting XI in a 1–0 win over Waterford in the 2026 FAI Cup final at the Aviva Stadium.

== Career statistics ==
As of match played on 8 November 2026

Appearances and goals by club, season and competition
Club	Season	League			National Cup (Note: Includes FA Cup & FAI Cup)		League Cup (Note: Includes EFL Cup)		Europe		Other		Total	
Club	Season	Division	Apps	Goals	Apps	Goals	Apps	Goals	Apps	Goals	Apps	Goals	Apps	Goals
Hull City	2017–18	Championship	0	0	0	0	1	0	—		0	0	1	0
Hull City	2018–19	Championship	4	0	0	0	2	0	—		0	0	6	0
Hull City	2019–20	Championship	4	0	1	0	2	0	—		0	0	7	0
Hull City	2020–21	League One	3	0	1	0	2	0	—		3 (Note: Appearances in the EFL Trophy)	0	9	0
Hull City	2021–22	Championship	16	0	0	0	1	0	—		0	0	17	0
Hull City	2022–23	Championship	4	0	0	0	0	0	—		0	0	4	0
Hull City	2023–24	Championship	0	0	0	0	1	0	—		0	0	1	0
Hull City	Total		31	0	1	0	9	0	0	0	3	0	45	0
Bolton Wanderers (loan)	2019–20	League One	10	0	0	0	0	0	—		0	0	10	0
Oxford United	2022–23	League One	14	0	1	0	0	0	—		0	0	15	0
Shrewsbury Town	2023–24	League One	8	0	0	0	0	0	—		0	0	8	0
Doncaster Rovers (loan)	2024–25	League Two	17	0	1	0	0	0	—		2	0	20	0
Forest Green Rovers (loan)	2024–25	National League	9	0	0	0	—		—		0	0	9	0
Derry City	2025	LOI Premier Division	12	1	1	0	—		—		—		13	1
Derry City	2026	LOI Premier Division	32	0	4	0	—		3 (Note: 1 appearance in UEFA Europa League; 2 appearances in UEFA Conference League)	0	1 (Note: Appearance in President of Ireland's Cup)	0	40	0
Derry City	Total		44	1	5	0	—		3	0	1	0	53	1
Career total			133	1	9	0	9	0	3	0	5	0	169	1

== Honours ==
Doncaster Rovers

- EFL League Two: 2024–25

Derry City

- FAI Cup: 2026
