= Zain Westbrooke =

English footballer (born 1996)

Personal information
- Full name: Zain Sam Westbrooke
- Date of birth: 28 October 1996 (age 30)
- Place of birth: Chertsey, England
- Height: 5 ft 11 in (1.80 m)
- Position: Central midfielder

Team information
- Current team: Yeovil Town
- Number: 25

Youth career
- –2011: Chelsea
- 2011–2015: Brentford

Senior career*
Years	Team	Apps	(Gls)
2015–2018	Brentford	1	(0)
2017	→ Solihull Moors (loan)	2	(0)
2017–2018	→ Leyton Orient (loan)	5	(0)
2018–2020	Coventry City	32	(4)
2020–2023	Bristol Rovers	46	(2)
2022	→ Stevenage (loan)	12	(0)
2023–2026	Doncaster Rovers	53	(2)
2025–2026	→ Scunthorpe United (loan)	34	(2)
2026–	Yeovil Town	17	(1)
- * Club domestic league appearances and goals as of 22:47, 21 November 2026 (UTC)

Zain Sam Westbrooke (born 28 October 1996) is an English professional footballer who plays as a central midfielder for National League club Yeovil Town.

Westbrooke is a graduate of the Brentford academy and made his professional breakthrough with Coventry City, before transferring to Bristol Rovers in 2020. He transferred to Doncaster Rovers in 2023. After falling out of favour, he transferred to Yeovil Town in 2026.

== Career ==
=== Brentford ===
Westbrooke began his career in the academy at Chelsea, before moving to West London neighbours Brentford in 2011 and signing scholarship forms at the end of the 2012–13 season. By the completion of his scholarship in April 2015, he had made 55 appearances and scored four goals for the youth team, in addition to scoring two goals in eight matches for the Development Squad during the 2014–15 season. Westbrooke signed a one-year Development Squad contract for the 2015–16 season and by November 2015 he had impressed sufficiently to sign a one-year extension. He finished the 2015–16 season with 23 appearances and one goal.

Westbrooke was named captain of the new B team for the 2016–17 season and signed a new one-year contract on 17 February 2017. He topped the B team's appearance-chart during the 2016–17 season, making 38 appearances and scoring six goals. He also voted the B Team Players' Player of the Year. Westbrooke was called into the first team squad for the final two matches of the 2016–17 season and made his debut in the West London derby with Fulham as a 76th-minute substitute for Konstantin Kerschbaumer on 29 April 2017.

Mounting injuries led to Westbrooke's inclusion on the first team bench for a league match versus Ipswich Town on 19 August 2017, but he remained an unused substitute during the 2–0 defeat. Westbrooke subsequently spent much of the first half of the 2017–18 season away on loan at National League clubs Solihull Moors and Leyton Orient, for both of whom he appeared sparingly. After his return on 10 January 2018, Westbrooke spent the remainder of the 2017–18 season with the B team. He departed Griffin Park on 7 May 2018.

=== Coventry City ===
On 7 May 2018, Westbrooke joined Coventry City on a two-year contract on a free transfer, with the option of a further year, effective 1 July 2018. The club's victory in the 2018 League Two play-off final, after the announcement of his transfer, meant that he began his time with the club in League One. After a substitute appearance in an EFL Trophy group stage match, Westbrooke made his full debut for the club with a start in a 1–0 win over Southend United on 29 December 2018. He had a short run in the team in late-January and early-February 2019 and finished the 2018–19 season with eight appearances.

Westbrooke broke into the team and made 33 appearances and scored four goals during the truncated 2019–20 season, which ended with promotion to the Championship as League One champions. After making 41 appearances and scoring four goals during his two seasons with Coventry City, Westbrooke transferred out of the club in August 2020.

=== Bristol Rovers ===
On 3 August 2020, Westbrooke signed a three-year contract with League One club Bristol Rovers for an undisclosed fee. He made 49 appearances and scored three goals during a 2020–21 season which culminated in relegation to League Two. After appearing in the first two matches of the 2021–22 season, manager Joey Barton dropped Westbrooke from the matchday squad and revealed that he was free to leave the club. A move did not materialise before the end of the summer transfer window and Westbrooke remained at the Memorial Stadium. He made a further seven appearances, predominantly in cup competitions, before joining League Two club Stevenage on loan until the end of the 2021–22 season on 17 January 2022. Westbrooke made 12 appearances during his spell and in his absence, Bristol Rovers were automatically promoted back to League One.

Returning to the Memorial Stadium for the 2022–23 pre-season, manager Joey Barton stated that Westbrooke's performances in training and matches had "done nothing but enhance his claim" for a first team place. Though he started in the opening match of the regular season versus Forest Green Rovers, Westbrooke was subsequently barred from first team training and was told he was free to leave the club. A move did not materialise before the end of the summer transfer window. After making just two EFL Trophy appearances since the opening day of the season, Westbrooke's contract was terminated by mutual consent on 23 January 2023. He made 61 appearances and scored four goals during 2 1/2 years at the Memorial Stadium.

=== Doncaster Rovers ===
Following a period training with Walsall, Westbrooke joined League Two club Doncaster Rovers as a free agent on 24 March 2023 and signed a contract running until the end of the 2022–23 season. He made eight appearances and signed a one-year contract at the end of the season. Either side of three months out with a thigh muscle tear suffered in early December 2023, Westbrooke made 34 appearances and scored two goals during the 2023–24 season, which culminated in a playoff semi-final defeat. He signed a new two-year contract in March 2024, effective 1 July 2024. Further thigh problems restricted Westbrooke's appearances during the first half of the 2024–25 season. He regained his fitness in March 2025 and ended the 2024–25 League Two championship-winning season with 10 appearances.

On 1 October 2025, having failed to make an appearance to date during the 2025–26 season, Westbrooke joined National League club Scunthorpe United on a loan that was later extended until the end of the season. He made 42 appearances and scored two goals during his spell, which culminated in a playoff semi-final defeat. Westbrooke was released by Doncaster Rovers when his contract expired at the end of the 2025–26 season.

=== Yeovil Town ===
On 28 May 2026, Westbrooke signed a three-year contract with National League club Yeovil Town on a free transfer.

== Personal life ==
Westbrooke is of Pakistani descent through his maternal grandfather. He attended Woking High School and is a Tottenham Hotspur supporter.

== Career statistics ==
As of match played 21 November 2026

Appearances and goals by club, season and competition
Club	Season	League			National cup (Note: Includes FA Cup)		League cup (Note: Includes EFL Cup, National League Cup)		Other		Total	
Club	Season	Division	Apps	Goals	Apps	Goals	Apps	Goals	Apps	Goals	Apps	Goals
Brentford	2016–17	Championship	1	0	0	0	0	0	—		1	0
Brentford	2017–18	Championship	0	0	—		0	0	—		0	0
Brentford	Total		1	0	0	0	0	0	—		1	0
Solihull Moors (loan)	2017–18	National League	2	0	—		—		—		2	0
Leyton Orient (loan)	2017–18	National League	5	0	3	0	—		0	0	8	0
Coventry City	2018–19	League One	7	0	0	0	0	0	1 (Note: Appearance(s) in EFL Trophy)	0	8	0
Coventry City	2019–20	League One	25	4	6	0	1	0	1	0	33	4
Coventry City	Total		32	4	6	0	1	0	2	0	41	4
Bristol Rovers	2020–21	League One	42	2	3	0	1	0	3	1	49	3
Bristol Rovers	2021–22	League Two	3	0	2	0	1	0	3	1	9	1
Bristol Rovers	2022–23	League One	1	0	0	0	0	0	2	0	3	0
Bristol Rovers	Total		46	2	5	0	2	0	8	2	61	4
Stevenage (loan)	2021–22	League Two	12	0	—		—		—		12	0
Doncaster Rovers	2022–23	League Two	8	0	—		—		—		8	0
Doncaster Rovers	2023–24	League Two	35	2	2	1	2	0	4 (Note: 3 appearances in EFL Trophy, 1 appearance in League Two play-offs)	0	35	2
Doncaster Rovers	2024–25	League Two	10	0	0	0	2	0	1	0	10	0
Doncaster Rovers	2025–26	League One	0	0	—		0	0	0	0	0	0
Doncaster Rovers	Total		42	1	2	1	4	0	5	0	53	2
Scunthorpe United (loan)	2025–26	National League	34	2	1	0	2	0	5 (Note: 3 appearances in FA Trophy, 2 appearances in National League play-offs)	0	42	2
Yeovil Town	2026–27	National League	17	1	1	0	—		0	0	18	1
Career total			192	10	18	1	9	0	20	2	239	13

== Honours ==
Coventry City

- EFL League One: 2019–20

Doncaster Rovers

- EFL League Two: 2024–25

Individual

- Brentford B Players' Player of the Year: 2016–17
