= Jamie Sterry =

English footballer (born 1995)

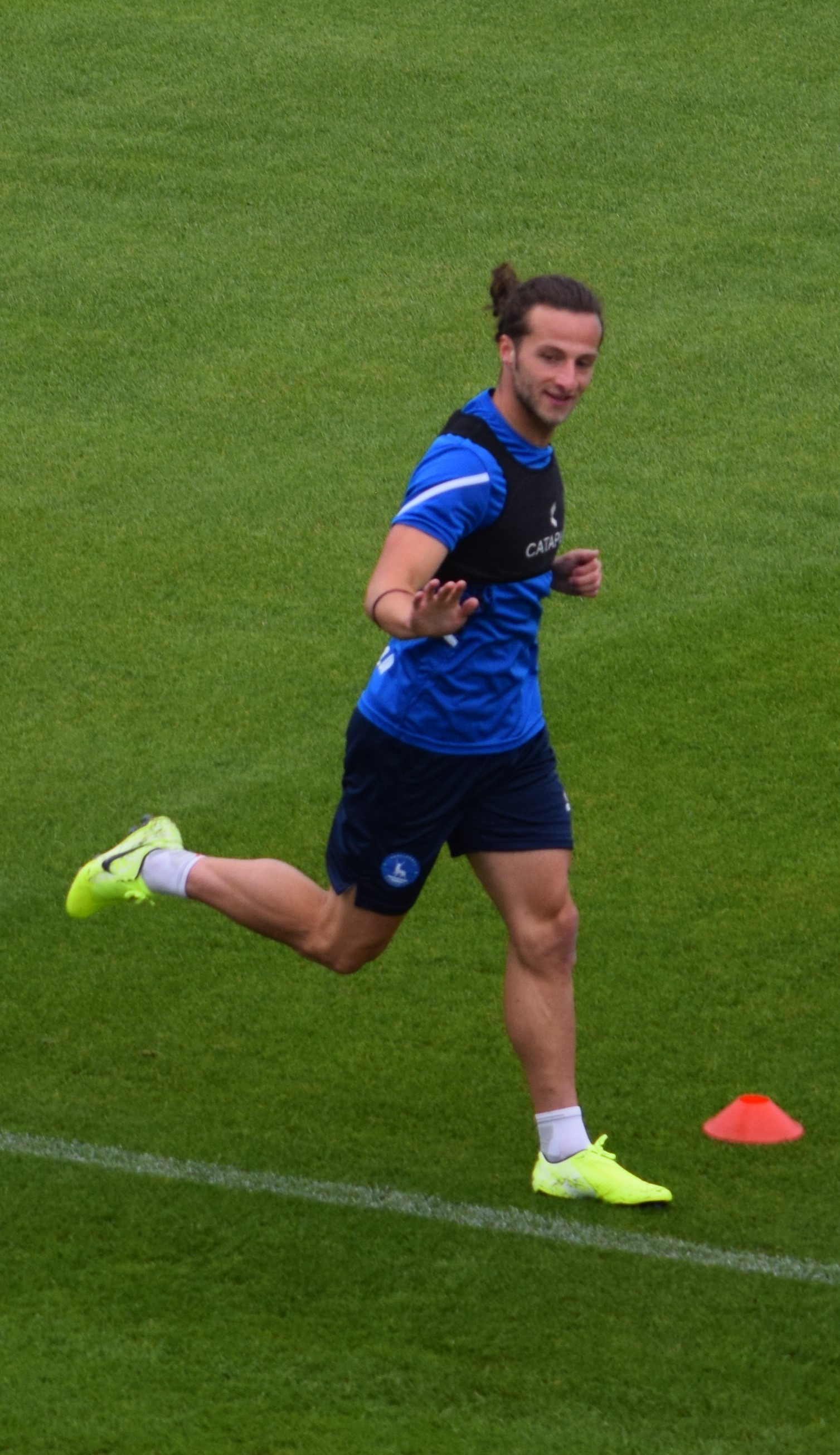
- Sterry warming up for Hartlepool United in 2022

Personal information
- Full name: Jamie Michael Sterry
- Date of birth: 21 November 1995 (age 30)
- Place of birth: Newcastle upon Tyne, England
- Height: 5 ft 11 in (1.80 m)
- Position: Right back

Team information
- Current team: Doncaster Rovers
- Number: 2

Youth career
- 2011–2016: Newcastle United

Senior career*
Years	Team	Apps	(Gls)
2015–2020	Newcastle United	3	(0)
2016–2017	→ Coventry City (loan)	16	(0)
2018–2019	→ Crewe Alexandra (loan)	10	(0)
2020	South Shields	2	(0)
2020–2023	Hartlepool United	90	(4)
2023–	Doncaster Rovers	101	(2)
- * Club domestic league appearances and goals as of 11:05, 8 October 2026 (UTC)

Jamie Michael Sterry (born 21 November 1995) is an English professional footballer who plays for EFL League One club Doncaster Rovers.

Sterry came through the ranks with Newcastle United, signing his first professional contract in July 2015 and making his Newcastle debut in 2016. He had spells on loan with Coventry City and Crewe Alexandra before being released by Newcastle in 2020. Sterry had a brief spell with non-League South Shields before joining Hartlepool United. In his first season with the club, Hartlepool earned promotion to League Two after winning the 2021 play-off final on penalties, with Sterry scoring a penalty in the shootout. He left Hartlepool in 2023 having made 102 appearances in total, signing for Doncaster Rovers.

== Career ==
=== Early career ===
Sterry began his career with Newcastle United, where he progressed through the youth ranks at St James' Park and signed a professional contract in July 2015. He made his Premier League debut on 15 May 2016, coming on as an 84th-minute substitute in place of Moussa Sissoko during a 5–1 home win over Tottenham Hotspur.

On 31 August 2016, he joined Coventry City on loan until January. Sterry scored his first professional goal for Coventry in an FA Cup tie against Morecambe on 6 November 2016.

On 31 January 2018, Sterry joined Crewe Alexandra on loan until the end of the season. He made his Crewe debut on 3 February 2018 at Notts County. He returned to Crewe for a further loan spell in January 2019, but the loan spell was cut short after Sterry made just one appearance (against Northampton Town on 2 March) for Crewe.

On 23 June 2020, Sterry was released by Newcastle United. He joined Northern Premier League side South Shields four months later.

=== Hartlepool United ===
On 21 December 2020, Sterry signed for National League club Hartlepool United. He made his debut for Hartlepool the following day in a 4–0 win against Stockport County. On 22 January 2021, he decided to stay with the National League club until the end of the season.

During the 2020–21 season, Sterry played predominantly at right wing back; forming a partnership with Newcastle loanee Lewis Cass. He started in the 2021 National League play-off final for Hartlepool as they drew 1–1 with Torquay United. In the resulting penalty shoot-out, Sterry scored his penalty as Hartlepool were promoted back to League Two. Sterry described the 2020–21 season at Hartlepool as his most enjoyable year by far after his struggles with mental health earlier in his career.

On 12 July 2021, he signed a new two-year contract with Hartlepool. On 11 September 2021, Sterry scored his first Hartlepool goal in a 1–0 victory over Bristol Rovers. Over Christmas 2022, Sterry helped to raise over £1,500 for a local foodbank. He was later nominated as Hartlepool's PFA Community Champion for his efforts.

At the end of the 2022–23 season, Sterry was offered a new deal with Hartlepool but he turned it down in order to explore other options. He made 102 appearances in all competitions for Pools and scored on his final appearance in a 3–1 win against Barrow on 29 April 2023, a day which saw the club relegated back to the National League after results went against them.

=== Doncaster Rovers ===
On 26 May 2023, Sterry signed for Doncaster Rovers on a two-year contract. Sterry made his competitive debut on 5 August 2023 in a 2–1 home defeat to Harrogate Town in the opening match of the 2023–24 League Two season. During his first campaign at the club, Sterry established himself as the club's first-choice right-back, making 29 appearances in all competitions as Doncaster reached the League Two play-offs.

In the 2024–25 season, Sterry Made 47 appearances in all competitions and scoring his first two goals for the club. He also contributed seven league assists as Doncaster won the League Two title and secured promotion to League One.

On 3 April 2025, Sterry signed a new deal until the summer of 2027 with an option of a further 12 months.

== Career statistics ==
As of match played 2 May 2026

Appearances and goals by club, season and competition
Club	Season	League			FA Cup		EFL Cup		Other		Total	
Club	Season	Division	Apps	Goals	Apps	Goals	Apps	Goals	Apps	Goals	Apps	Goals
Newcastle United	2015–16	Premier League	1	0	0	0	0	0	—		1	0
Newcastle United	2016–17	Championship	2	0	0	0	1	0	—		3	0
Newcastle United	2017–18	Premier League	0	0	0	0	1	0	3 (Note: Appearance(s) in EFL Trophy)	0	4	0
Newcastle United	2018–19	Premier League	0	0	2	0	1	0	1	0	4	0
Newcastle United	Total		3	0	2	0	3	0	4	0	12	0
Coventry City (loan)	2016–17	League One	16	0	2	1	0	0	2	0	20	1
Crewe Alexandra (loan)	2017–18	League Two	9	0	0	0	0	0	0	0	9	0
Crewe Alexandra (loan)	2018–19	League Two	1	0	0	0	0	0	0	0	1	0
Crewe Alexandra (loan)	Total		10	0	0	0	0	0	0	0	10	0
South Shields	2020–21	Northern Premier League	2	0	1	0	0	0	1 (Note: Appearance(s) in FA Trophy)	1	4	1
Hartlepool United	2020–21	National League	27	0	0	0	0	0	3 (Note: Appearance(s) in National League play-offs)	0	30	0
Hartlepool United	2021–22	League Two	37	2	3	0	1	0	3	0	44	2
Hartlepool United	2022–23	League Two	26	2	0	0	0	0	2	0	28	2
Hartlepool United	Total		90	4	3	0	1	0	8	0	102	4
Doncaster Rovers	2023–24	League Two	26	0	0	0	0	0	3 (Note: 2 appearances in EFL Trophy, 1 appearance in League Two play-offs)	0	29	0
Doncaster Rovers	2024–25	League Two	41	2	4	0	1	0	1	0	47	2
Doncaster Rovers	2025–26	League One	32	0	2	0	0	0	2	0	36	0
Doncaster Rovers	2026–27	League One	2	0	0	0	2	0	0	0	4	0
Doncaster Rovers	Total		99	2	6	0	1	0	6	0	112	2
Career total			220	6	14	1	4	0	20	1	260	8

== Honours ==
Newcastle United

- EFL Championship: 2016–17

Hartlepool United

- National League play-offs: 2021

Doncaster Rovers

- EFL League Two: 2024–25
