= Kyle Hurst =

English footballer (born 2002)

Personal information
- Full name: Kyle Christopher Hurst
- Date of birth: 20 April 2002 (age 24)
- Place of birth: Milton Keynes, England
- Height: 1.78 m (5 ft 10 in)
- Positions: Winger; forward

Team information
- Current team: Scunthorpe United
- Number: 18

Youth career
- Milton Keynes Dons
- 20??–2020: Birmingham City

Senior career*
Years	Team	Apps	(Gls)
2020–2022	Birmingham City	0	(0)
2022	→ Alvechurch (loan)	4	(0)
2022–2026	Doncaster Rovers	108	(15)
2025	→ Queen's Park (loan)	10	(0)
2025–2026	→ Gateshead (loan)	25	(4)
2026	→ Scunthorpe United (loan)	5	(0)
2026–	Scunthorpe United	10	(2)
- * Club domestic league appearances and goals as of 14 October 2026 (UTC)

Kyle Christopher Hurst (born 20 January 2002) is an English professional footballer who plays as a winger or forward for Scunthorpe United

He began his football career as a youngster with Milton Keynes Dons before joining Birmingham City at 16 and turning professional two years later. He had a loan spell with Southern League club Alvechurch in early 2022, but never played first-team football for Birmingham, and left the club for Doncaster Rovers in July 2022.

== Club career ==
=== Birmingham City ===
Hurst was born in Milton Keynes, and was a youth player with Milton Keynes Dons before taking up a two-year scholarship with Birmingham City in July 2018. According to coach Steve Spooner, Hurst is "a wonderful technician. He has great dribbling skills, great receiving skills. Very attack-minded and can deliver good crosses, but he must become more consistent with his end product."

On his first competitive start for Birmingham's development squad team, in September 2018, Hurst scored the second goal of a 4–0 win against Sheffield Wednesday U23. He scored in the semi-final of the 2019 Professional Development League (PDL) play-offs against Ipswich Town, and started in the final, but had been substituted by the time Birmingham lost to Leeds United U23 in a penalty shoot-out. The following season, he scored an 86th-minute winning goal that took Birmingham into the fifth round of the FA Youth Cup despite having had two players sent off; according to the report on the club's website, he "flicked the ball over an opponent, darted on into the area behind the defensive line and cracked a half-volley that went in off the post." Hurst was given a first-team squad number in 2020, but a hamstring issue prevented any involvement with the matchday squad, and he signed his first professional contract, of three years with the option of a fourth, in June 2020. He again helped Birmingham U23 qualify for the PDL play-offs in 2021, and played the whole of the semi-final win away to Bristol City, but was an unused substitute as his side beat Sheffield United to gain promotion to Premier League 2 for 2021–22.

Hurst scored four goals from 17 appearances for Birmingham's U23 team in the 2021–22 Premier League 2 season. He joined Southern League Premier Division Central club Alvechurch in mid-February 2022 on loan until the end of the season. He made his debut in senior football on 12 February, starting in a 1–1 draw away to Tamworth, and made three more appearances before returning to his parent club.

=== Doncaster Rovers ===
After a trial in which Hurst played in several pre-season friendlies for Doncaster Rovers, he signed a two-year contract with the League Two club on 22 July 2022. He made his club and Football League debut on the opening day of the 2022–23 season, playing 82 minutes of a goalless draw away to Bradford City before being substituted immediately after receiving a yellow card. Hurst continued in the starting eleven, and scored his first senior goals in his fifth league match, a 20-yard (18 m) chip over the goalkeeper and a powerful shot high to his near post, to complete Doncaster's comeback from 1–0 down against Salford City. On 1 March 2023, by which time he had seven goals from 36 appearances in all competitions, he signed a two-and-a-half-year contract with the club.

Having been almost ever-present in 2022–23, injury kept Hurst out of the new season until 9 September.

During the 2024–25 season, Hurst continued to contribute to Rovers’ promotion push. On 26 October 2024, he provided both assists in a 2–1 away win against Bradford City, setting up the opening goals for Luke Molyneux and Billy Sharp in a Yorkshire derby fixture. The following week, in a Football League Trophy match on 29 October 2024, Hurst scored in Doncaster’s 3–1 victory over Barnsley, coming off the bench to net the third goal and help secure progression in the competition.

By the middle of the 2024–25 season, Hurst had lost his first-team place. His contract with Doncaster was extended to run until June 2026, and he joined Scottish Championship club Queen's Park on loan for the remainder of the season. He made his debut on 9 February, replacing Seb Drozd in the starting eleven for the Scottish Cup fifth round match against Rangers at Ibrox Park. He came close to opening the scoring in the second half before being replaced by Drozd, who gave Queen's Park the lead two minutes later. Seven minutes into stoppage time, Rangers were awarded a penalty kick, which was saved by Calum Ferrie to inflict what was Rangers' first Scottish Cup defeat to lower league opponents since 1967 and only such defeat at home.

On 9 August 2025, Hurst joined National League club Gateshead on loan until 4 January 2026. On 8 January 2026, he joined fellow National League side Scunthorpe United on loan for the remainder of the season.

He was released by Doncaster upon the expiry of his contract at the end of the 2025–26 season.

=== Scunthorpe United ===
On 25 June, Hurst returned to Scunthorpe on a permanent deal.

== Career statistics ==
As of match played 22 March 2025

Appearances and goals by club, season and competition
Club	Season	League			National cup (Note: Includes FA Cup, Scottish Cup)		EFL Cup		Other		Total	
Club	Season	Division	Apps	Goals	Apps	Goals	Apps	Goals	Apps	Goals	Apps	Goals
Birmingham City	2021–22	Championship	0	0	0	0	0	0	—		0	0
Alvechurch (loan)	2021–22	Southern League; Premier Division Central	4	0	—		—		0	0	4	0
Doncaster Rovers	2022–23	League Two	45	7	1	0	1	0	3 (Note: Appearance(s) in EFL Trophy)	1	50	7
Doncaster Rovers	2023–24	League Two	35	4	3	0	0	0	6 (Note: Four appearances in EFL Trophy, two in League Two play-offs)	2	30	4
Doncaster Rovers	2024–25	League Two	28	4	2	0	1	0	4	1	28	4
Doncaster Rovers	2025–26	League One	0	0	0	0	0	0	0	0	0	0
Doncaster Rovers	Total		87	11	6	0	2	0	13	4	108	15
Queen's Park (loan)	2024–25	Scottish Championship	7	0	2	0	—		0	0	9	0
Career total			98	11	8	0	2	0	13	4	121	15

== Honours ==
Queen's Park

- Scottish Challenge Cup runner-up: 2024–25

Doncaster Rovers

- EFL League Two: 2024–25
