= Jack Degruchy =

English footballer (born 2003)

Personal information
- Full name: Jack Degruchy
- Date of birth: 13 August 2003 (age 23)
- Place of birth: Knaresborough, England
- Height: 1.77 m (5 ft 10 in)
- Position: Midfielder

Team information
- Current team: Knaresborough Town

Youth career
- York City

Senior career*
Years	Team	Apps	(Gls)
2022–2025	Doncaster Rovers	3	(0)
2022–2023	→ FC United of Manchester (loan)	14	(0)
2023	→ Marske United (loan)	1	(0)
2024	→ Kettering Town (loan)	4	(0)
2024	→ Matlock Town (loan)	0	(0)
2024	→ Hanley Town (loan)	6	(1)
2024–2025	→ Liversedge (loan)	34	(1)
2025–2026	Stocksbridge Park Steels		
2026	Spennymoor Town		
2026–	Knaresborough Town		
- * Club domestic league appearances and goals as of 07:04, 6 September 2026 (UTC)

Jack Degruchy (born 13 August 2003) is an English professional footballer who plays as a midfielder for Knaresborough Town.

== Career ==
=== Doncaster Rovers ===
Born in Knaresborough, after playing for York City, Degruchy signed for Doncaster Rovers in July 2022.

He made his league debut for Doncaster Rovers in their 0–0 draw with Bradford City in EFL League Two, being replaced by Josh Andrews after half time.

On 12 September 2022, Degruchy and team-mate Tavonga Kuleya were sent on a youth loan to FC United of Manchester. Degruchy was recalled in February 2023.

In July 2023, Degruchy and Kuleya signed on loan for Marske United, where he made one league appearance. He joined Kettering Town in January 2024 on an initial one-month loan deal. He joined Matlock Town in March 2024 on loan for the remainder of the season.

In July 2024, Degruchy joined Hanley Town on loan. He signed on loan for Liversedge in September 2024, with the loan being extended in February 2025 to the end of the season.

Degruchy was released by Doncaster Rovers at the end of the 2024–25 season.

=== Non-League ===
In July 2025, Degruchy joined newly promoted Northern Premier League Premier Division side Stocksbridge Park Steels. After playing with Spennymoor Town, he signed for Knaresborough Town in July 2026.
