= Louis Jones (footballer) =

English footballer

Personal information
- Full name: Louis Jones
- Date of birth: 12 October 1998 (age 28)
- Place of birth: Doncaster, England
- Height: 6 ft 1 in (1.85 m)
- Position: Goalkeeper

Team information
- Current team: Scunthorpe United
- Number: 1

Youth career
- 2010–2016: Doncaster Rovers

Senior career*
Years	Team	Apps	(Gls)
2016–2025	Doncaster Rovers	45	(0)
2017	→ Gainsborough Trinity (loan)	3	(0)
2017	→ Tadcaster Albion (loan)		
2017	→ Sheffield (loan)		
2018	→ Grantham Town (loan)		
2019	→ Mickleover Sports (loan)	2	(0)
2019	→ Yeovil Town (loan)	0	(0)
2024	→ Waterford (loan)	6	(0)
2025	Dagenham & Redbridge	7	(0)
2025–	Scunthorpe United	0	(0)
- * Club domestic league appearances and goals as of 18:42, 3 December 2025 (UTC)

Louis Jones (born 12 October 1998) is an English professional footballer who plays as a goalkeeper for National League club Scunthorpe United.

== Career ==
=== Doncaster Rovers ===
After coming through the youth system since being a 12 year old, Jones signed his first professional contract with Doncaster Rovers in March 2017. This was extended in March 2018, then further in January 2019 for 18 months, and again in July 2020, until 2022.

Following several loan moves, Jones made his first team debut in the EFL Trophy on 8 September 2020 against Bradford City, where he saved a penalty in the shoot out at the end of the 0–0 draw.

He played his first League game in the 2-1 Doncaster win over Portsmouth on 2 March 2021 as Andy Butler took over managing the team.

In July 2024, Jones joined League of Ireland Premier Division side Waterford on loan for the remainder of the 2024 season.

=== Non-League ===
On 7 February 2025, Jones signed for National League side Dagenham & Redbridge for an undisclosed fee on a short-term deal until the end of the season.

On 29 November 2025, Jones joined National League club Scunthorpe United on non-contract terms.

== Career statistics ==
As of match played 22 March 2025

Appearances and goals by club, season and competition
Club	Season	League			National Cup (Note: Includes FAI Cup, FA Cup)		League Cup (Note: Includes EFL Cup)		Other		Total	
Club	Season	Division	Apps	Goals	Apps	Goals	Apps	Goals	Apps	Goals	Apps	Goals
Doncaster Rovers	2015–16	League One	0	0	0	0	0	0	0	0	0	0
Doncaster Rovers	2016–17	League Two	0	0	0	0	0	0	0	0	0	0
Doncaster Rovers	2017–18	League One	0	0	0	0	0	0	0	0	0	0
Doncaster Rovers	2018–19	League One	0	0	0	0	0	0	0	0	0	0
Doncaster Rovers	2019–20	League One	0	0	0	0	0	0	0	0	0	0
Doncaster Rovers	2020–21	League One	13	0	1	0	0	0	3 (Note: Appearance(s) in EFL Trophy)	0	17	0
Doncaster Rovers	2021–22	League One	10	0	1	0	1	0	4	0	16	0
Doncaster Rovers	2022–23	League Two	2	0	0	0	0	0	3	0	5	0
Doncaster Rovers	2023–24	League Two	20	0	3	0	0	0	4	0	27	0
Doncaster Rovers	Total		45	0	5	0	1	0	14	0	65	0
Gainsborough Trinity (loan)	2016–17	National League North	3	0	—		—		—		3	0
Mickleover Sports (loan)	2019–20	NPL Premier Division	2	0	—		—		—		2	0
Yeovil Town (loan)	2019–20	National League	0	0	—		—		—		0	0
Waterford (loan)	2024	LOI Premier Division	6	0	1	0	—		—		7	0
Dagenham & Redbridge	2024–25	National League	7	0	—		—		—		7	0
Career total			63	0	6	0	1	0	14	0	84	0
