= Deji Sotona =

Irish footballer (born 2002)

Personal information
- Full name: Ayodeji Sotona
- Date of birth: 7 December 2002 (age 23)
- Place of birth: Waterford, Ireland
- Height: 1.79 m (5 ft 10 in)
- Position: Forward

Youth career
- –2016: Mullingar Athletic
- 2015–2016: Leixlip United
- 2016–2020: Manchester United
- 2020–2023: Nice
- 2022: → Brentford B (loan)
- 2023: Burnley

Senior career*
| Years | Team | Apps | (Gls) |
| 2022–2023 | Nice | 0 | (0) |
| 2022–2023 | → Kilmarnock (loan) | 2 | (0) |
| 2023 | Burnley | 0 | (0) |
| 2023–2024 | Doncaster Rovers | 6 | (1) |
| 2023–2024 | → Boston United (loan) | 19 | (2) |
| 2024–2025 | Eastleigh | 1 | (0) |
| 2025–2026 | Boston United | 0 | (0) |
| 2025–2026 | → Witton Albion (dual–registration) | 11 | (1) |
| 2026 | King's Lynn Town | 3 | (0) |

International career
| 2017 | Republic of Ireland U15 | 2 | (1) |
| 2018 | Republic of Ireland U16 | 2 | (0) |
- * Club domestic league appearances and goals as of 14:45, 8 May 2026 (UTC)

Ayodeji Sotona (born 7 December 2002) is an Irish professional footballer who most recently played as a forward for National League North club King's Lynn Town.

== Club career ==
=== Early career ===
Sotona was born in Waterford, but moved to Mullingar as a child, where he joined local side Mullingar Athletic. At a young age, he joined the Mullingar Harriers Athletic Club, picking up several provincial and national sprinting medals, including an All-Ireland bronze medal in 2013. He then went on to play for Leixlip United.

At the age of 13, he began attracting attention from English sides Manchester City and Manchester United, eventually signing with the latter. While at Manchester United, Sotona was named as the club's fastest player, ahead of first team members Diogo Dalot, Marcus Rashford and Daniel James. After four years with the club, in which he trained with the first team, he rejected the offer of a three-year extension to his contract, and left the club as a free agent in September 2020.

=== Nice ===
After a phone call with Patrick Vieira, who was managing Nice at the time, Sotona decided to join the French side at the expiration of his contract with Manchester United. Vieira had promised first-team football, but after he was sacked in December 2020, new manager Adrian Ursea assigned Sotona to the reserves.

With the COVID-19 pandemic disrupting the footballing schedule, he struggled for game time, and when a return to England with Brentford B presented itself in January 2022, Sotona took the opportunity, and joined on a six-month loan deal. On 9 August 2022, Sotona signed for Scottish club Kilmarnock on a season-long loan. He returned to Nice in January 2023.

=== Burnley ===
On 30 January 2023, Sotona moved to Burnley, playing for their academy squad until the end of the season.

=== Doncaster Rovers ===
On 14 July 2023, Sotona moved to Doncaster Rovers on a free transfer following his release from Burnley.

On 24 November 2023, he joined National League North club Boston United on loan until 13 January 2024. Following the expiration of the previous agreement, his loan was extended until the end of the season. He was part of the Boston Utd squad that gained promotion to the National League via the play offs.

Following the completion of the season, Sotona returned to Doncaster where he was placed on the transfer list.

=== Eastleigh ===
On 25 June 2024, Sotona joined National League side Eastleigh for an undisclosed fee. On 10 August 2024, his debut for the Spitfires, he suffered an Anterior cruciate ligament injury that was expected to rule him out for the remainder of the season. He departed the club upon the expiration of his contract at the end of the 2024–25 season.

=== Return to Boston United ===
On 28 November 2025, Sotona returned to National League club Boston United on a short-term deal. On 19 December 2025, he joined Northern Premier League Division One West club Witton Albion on dual-registration, linking up with his brother Damola who already played for the club.

=== King's Lynn Town ===
On 17 March 2025, Sotona joined National League North club King's Lynn Town. He made three substitute appearances before the end of the season, before being released by the club.

== International career ==
Sotona is eligible to represent the Republic of Ireland, Nigeria and England at international level. He has represented the Republic of Ireland at under-15 and under-16 level.

== Career statistics ==
As of end of 2024–25 season

Appearances and goals by club, season and competition
| Club | Season | League | | | National cup (Note: Includes FA Cup, Coupe de France and Scottish Cup) | | League cup (Note: Includes EFL Cup and Scottish League Cup) | | Other | | Total | |
| Club | Season | Division | Apps | Goals | Apps | Goals | Apps | Goals | Apps | Goals | Apps | Goals |
|---|---|---|---|---|---|---|---|---|---|---|---|---|
| Manchester United U23 | 2019–20 | — | | | — | | — | | 1 (Note: Appearance(s) in EFL Trophy) | 0 | 1 | 0 |
| Nice | 2020–21 | Ligue 1 | 0 | 0 | 0 | 0 | — | | 0 | 0 | 0 | 0 |
| Nice | 2021–22 | Ligue 1 | 0 | 0 | 0 | 0 | — | | 0 | 0 | 0 | 0 |
| Nice | 2022–23 | Ligue 1 | 0 | 0 | 0 | 0 | — | | 0 | 0 | 0 | 0 |
| Kilmarnock B (loan) | 2022–23 | — | | | — | | — | | 2 (Note: Appearances in the Scottish Challenge Cup) | 1 | 2 | 1 |
| Kilmarnock (loan) | 2022–23 | Scottish Premiership | 2 | 0 | 0 | 0 | 0 | 0 | 0 | 0 | 2 | 0 |
| Burnley | 2022–23 | Championship | 0 | 0 | 0 | 0 | 0 | 0 | 0 | 0 | 0 | 0 |
| Doncaster Rovers | 2023–24 | League One | 6 | 1 | 0 | 0 | 2 | 0 | 2 | 0 | 10 | 1 |
| Boston United (loan) | 2023–24 | National League North | 19 | 2 | 0 | 0 | — | | 3 (Note: Appearance(s) in National League North play-offs) | 0 | 22 | 2 |
| Eastleigh | 2024–25 | National League | 1 | 0 | 0 | 0 | — | | 0 | 0 | 1 | 0 |
| King's Lynn Town | 2025–26 | National League North | 3 | 0 | — | | — | | — | | 3 | 0 |
| Career total | | | 31 | 3 | 0 | 0 | 2 | 0 | 8 | 1 | 41 | 4 |

== Honours ==
Boston United

- National League North play-offs: 2024
