= Jack Goodman (footballer) =

English footballer (born 2005)

Personal information
- Full name: Jack Connor Goodman
- Date of birth: 21 March 2005 (age 21)
- Place of birth: Nottingham, England
- Position: Forward

Team information
- Current team: Mansfield Town)
- Number: 36

Youth career
- 2013–2018: Notts County
- 2018–2021: Hucknall Sports
- 2021: Notts County
- 2021: Doncaster Rovers

Senior career*
Years	Team	Apps	(Gls)
2021–2025	Doncaster Rovers	10	(0)
2022–2023	→ Stamford (loan)	1	(0)
2023	→ Gainsborough Trinity (loan)	4	(1)
2024	→ Matlock Town (loan)	1	(0)
2024	→ Peterborough Sports (loan)	13	(0)
2024–2025	→ Bradford (Park Avenue)	8	(1)
2025	→ Basford United (loan)	11	(1)
2025	Basford United	3	(1)
2025–	Mansfield Town	0	(0)
2025–	→ Basford United (loan)	0	(0)
- * Club domestic league appearances and goals as of 11:29, 11 September 2025 (UTC)

Jack Connor Goodman (born 21 March 2005) is an English professional footballer who plays as a forward for Northern Premier League Division One Midlands club Basford United on loan from Mansfield Town.

== Career ==
Goodman graduated from The Holgate Academy. He joined Notts County at under-8 level, but dropped out at under-13 level to play with Hucknall Sports. He rejoined Notts County in 2021, but elected to take up a scholarship at Doncaster Rovers. He made his first-team debut at the age of sixteen, having come on as an 87th-minute substitute for Joe Dodoo in a 3–2 win at Scunthorpe United in the EFL Trophy; this made him the seventh youngest person in history to play for the club. He scored eighteen goals for the youth-team in the 2021–22 campaign and scored five goals in one afternoon in July 2022. He made his home first-team debut at the Eco-Power Stadium on 9 August 2022, in a 3–0 defeat to Lincoln City in the EFL Cup; manager Gary McSheffrey said Goodman was "the positive for the night".

On 26 December 2022, he joined Stamford of the Northern Premier League Division One Midlands on loan.

Goodman made his league debut on 3 April 2023, coming on as a half time substitute in Doncaster's home match against Crewe Alexandra.

On 23 July 2023, Goodman signed for Gainsborough Trinity on loan for the 2023–24 season, however he was recalled just one month into the season. In February 2024, he joined Matlock Town on loan until the end of the season.

In July 2024, Goodman joined National League North club Peterborough Sports on an initial six-week loan deal. In November 2024, he joined Bradford (Park Avenue) on loan until January 2025. In January 2025, he joined Basford United on loan for the remainder of the season.

In May 2025, Goodman returned to Basford United on a permanent deal following his release from Doncaster Rovers.

On 10 September 2025, Goodman joined the under-21s side of League One club Mansfield Town, returning to Basford United on loan for the remainder of the season.

== Career statistics ==
As of match played 25 August 2025

Appearances and goals by club, season and competition
Club	Season	League			FA Cup		EFL Cup		Other		Total	
Club	Season	Division	Apps	Goals	Apps	Goals	Apps	Goals	Apps	Goals	Apps	Goals
Doncaster Rovers	2021–22	EFL League Two	0	0	0	0	0	0	1 (Note: Appearance(s) in the EFL Trophy)	0	1	0
Doncaster Rovers	2022–23	EFL League Two	7	0	0	0	1	0	1	0	9	0
Doncaster Rovers	2023–24	League Two	7	0	1	0	1	0	4	0	13	0
Doncaster Rovers	Total		14	0	1	0	2	0	6	0	23	0
Stamford (loan)	2022–23	Northern Premier League; Division One Midlands	0	0	0	0	0	0	0	0	0	0
Gainsborough Trinity (loan)	2023–24	NPL Premier Division	4	1	0	0	—		0	0	4	1
Matlock Town (loan)	2023–24	NPL Premier Division	1	0	—		—		0	0	1	0
Peterborough Sports (loan)	2024–25	National League North	13	0	5	0	—		0	0	18	0
Bradford (Park Avenue) (loan)	2024–25	NPL Division One East	8	1	0	0	—		0	0	8	1
Basford United (loan)	2024–25	NPL Premier Division	11	1	0	0	—		1 (Note: Appearance(s) in Nottinghamshire Senior Cup)	2	12	3
Basford United	2025–26	NPL Division One Midlands	3	1	1	1	—		0	0	4	2
Career total			54	4	7	1	2	0	7	2	70	7
