= Tyler Roberts (footballer, born 2003) =

Jamaican footballer (born 2003)

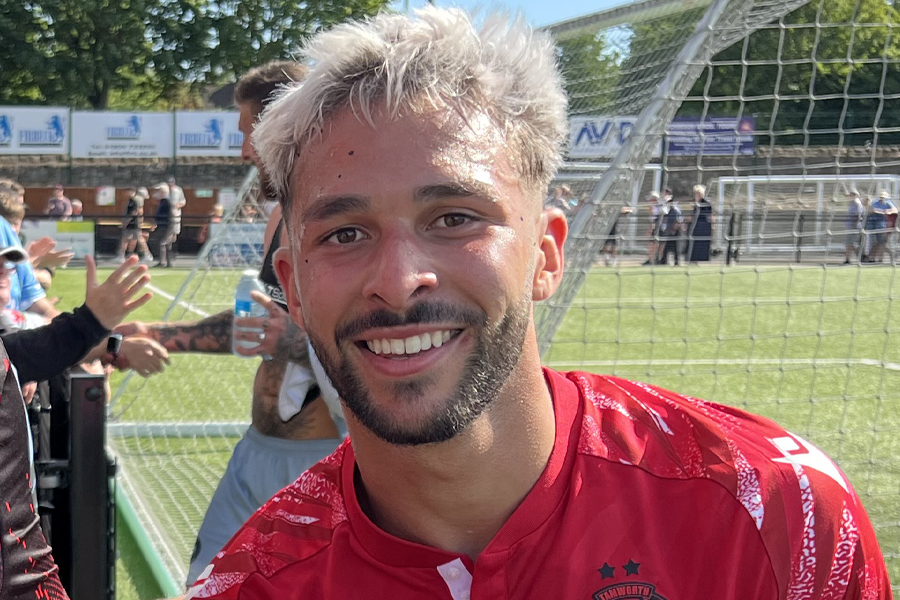
- Roberts in July 2025

Personal information
- Full name: Tyler Ashley Roberts
- Date of birth: 4 November 2003 (age 23)
- Place of birth: Walsall, England
- Height: 1.77 m (5 ft 10 in)
- Position: Winger

Team information
- Current team: Rushall Olympic

Youth career
- 2012–2022: Wolverhampton Wanderers

Senior career*
Years	Team	Apps	(Gls)
2022–2025	Wolverhampton Wanderers	0	(0)
2023–2024	→ Doncaster Rovers (loan)	10	(0)
2024–2025	→ AFC Fylde (loan)	14	(2)
2025	AFC Fylde	15	(1)
2025–2026	Tamworth	23	(1)
2026–	Rushall Olympic	0	(0)

International career^{‡}
2022	Jamaica U20	5	(0)
2023	Jamaica	1	(0)
- * Club domestic league appearances and goals as of 18:00, 6 August 2026 (UTC) ‡ National team caps and goals as of 18:00, 6 August 2026 (UTC)

Tyler Ashley Roberts (born 4 November 2003) is a professional footballer who plays as a winger for Southern League Premier Division Central side Rushall Olympic. Born in England, he plays for the Jamaica national team.

== Club career ==
=== Wolverhampton Wanderers ===
Roberts is a youth product of Wolverhampton Wanderers since the age of nine. He worked his way up their youth sides, until signing his first professional contract with the club on 14 November 2021. In September 2021 he started training with their senior team, having played with their U21 and U23 sides.

On 16 June 2023, Doncaster Rovers signed Roberts on a season-long loan. On 2 January 2024, his loan was ended and he returned to his parent club.

=== AFC Fylde ===
On 30 August 2024, Roberts joined National League side AFC Fylde on loan until 31 January 2025. In January 2025, he joined the club on a permanent eighteen-month contract.

=== Tamworth ===
On 22 June 2025, Roberts returned to the National League following AFC Fylde's relegation, joining Tamworth. Tyler made his National League debut for Tamworth on 9 August 2025, he started the opening day fixture at home to Scunthorpe United. In an eventful game Roberts was booked on the 18th minute, and was substitited for Harvey Sayer on the 83rd minute, as his new club succumbed to a 2–1 home defeat. Roberts scored once for Tamworth in the National League on 13 September 2025, in an away fixture against Sutton United, he scored Tamworth's second goal on the 20th minute in a 3–2 victory. Roberts went on to make 23 appearances for Tamworth, scoring a single goal.

=== Rushall Olympic ===
On 5 August 2026, Roberts was confirmed as signing for Southern League Premier Division Central side Rushall Olympic.

== International career ==
Roberts was born in England and is of Jamaican descent. He was called up to represent the Jamaica U20s for the 2022 CONCACAF U-20 Championship. He debuted for the senior Jamaica national team in a friendly 0–0 draw to Trinidad and Tobago on 14 March 2023.
