= Ben Bottomley =

English footballer (born 2002)

Personal information
- Full name: Ben Bottomley
- Date of birth: 22 October 2002 (age 24)
- Place of birth: Pontefract, England
- Position: Goalkeeper

Team information
- Current team: North Ferriby

Youth career
- –2021: Doncaster Rovers

Senior career*
Years	Team	Apps	(Gls)
2021–2024	Doncaster Rovers	0	(0)
2021	→ Frickley Athletic (loan)	5	(0)
2021–2022	→ Tadcaster Albion (loan)	4	(0)
2022	→ Pickering Town (loan)	9	(0)
2022	→ Lincoln United (loan)	5	(0)
2022	→ Tadcaster Albion (loan)	1	(0)
2023	→ Gainsborough Trinity (loan)	6	(0)
2024	→ Cleethorpes Town (loan)	2	(0)
2024–	North Ferriby	0	(0)
- * Club domestic league appearances and goals as of 11:37, 2 April 2024 (UTC)

Ben Bottomley (born 22 October 2002) is an English professional footballer who plays as a goalkeeper for North Ferriby.

== Career ==
Bottomley signed his first professional contract for Doncaster Rovers in July 2021. Across the 2021–22 and 2022–23 seasons, Bottomley spent time on loan at Frickley Athletic, twice with Tadcaster Albion,Pickering Town and Lincoln United.

In June 2023, Bottomley signed a new one-year deal with Doncaster. He joined Gainsborough Trinity on loan in November 2023. In March 2024, he joined Cleethorpes Town on loan for the remainder of the season.

On 15 May 2024, Doncaster announced he would be released in the summer when his contract expired.

== Career statistics ==
As of match played 26 December 2023

Appearances and goals by club, season and competition
Club	Season	League			FA Cup		League Cup		Other		Total	
Club	Season	Division	Apps	Goals	Apps	Goals	Apps	Goals	Apps	Goals	Apps	Goals
Frickley Athletic (loan)	2021–22	NPL Division One East	5	0	0	0	—		0	0	5	0
Tadcaster Albion (loan)	2021–22	NPL Division One East	4	0	0	0	—		0	0	4	0
Pickering Town (loan)	2021–22	NPL Division One East	9	0	—		—		0	0	9	0
Lincoln United (loan)	2022–23	NPL Division One East	5	0	1	0	—		0	0	6	0
Tadcaster Albion (loan)	2022–23	NPL Division One East	1	0	0	0	—		0	0	1	0
Gainsborough Trinity (loan)	2023–24	NPL Premier Division	6	0	0	0	—		0	0	6	0
Career total			30	0	1	0	0	0	0	0	31	0
