= Tavonga Kuleya =

English footballer

Personal information
- Full name: Tavonga Daniel Kuleya
- Date of birth: 15 June 2004 (age 22)
- Place of birth: Bradford, England
- Position: Winger

Team information
- Current team: Belper Town

Youth career
- Doncaster Rovers

Senior career*
| Years | Team | Apps | (Gls) |
| 2021–2025 | Doncaster Rovers | 8 | (0) |
| 2022 | → FC United of Manchester (loan) | 5 | (1) |
| 2022–2023 | → Worksop Town (loan) | 16 | (5) |
| 2023 | → Marske United (loan) | 0 | (0) |
| 2023 | → Sheffield (loan) | 2 | (0) |
| 2024 | → Gainsborough Trinity (loan) | 2 | (0) |
| 2024 | → Matlock Town (loan) | 12 | (2) |
| 2024 | → Truro City (loan) | 7 | (0) |
| 2024–2025 | → Belper Town (loan) | 10 | (3) |
| 2025– | Belper Town | 0 | (0) |
- * Club domestic league appearances and goals as of 13:21, 8 July 2025 (UTC)

Tavonga Daniel Kuleya (born 15 June 2004) is an English professional footballer who plays for Northern Premier League Division One Midlands side Belper Town.

== Career ==
=== Doncaster Rovers ===
He made his professional debut with Doncaster Rovers in a 3–2 EFL Trophy win over Scunthorpe United on 11 November 2021, assisting his side's first goal in the win.

In September 2022, Kuleya joined Northern Premier League Premier Division club FC United of Manchester on a one-month loan deal.

On the 8th of September 2023 Kuleya joined Sheffield F.C. on a one-month loan deal.

On 11 January 2024, Kuleya joined Gainsborough Trinity on an initial one-month loan deal. The following month, he joined Matlock Town on loan until the end of the season.

In August 2024, Kuleya joined National League South side Truro City on an initial one-month loan deal, later extended until January 2025. In December 2024, he was recalled before joining Belper Town on loan for the remainder of the 2024–25 season.

He departed the club upon the expiry of his contract at the end of the 2024–25 season.

=== Non-League ===
On 6 July 2025, Kuleya returned to Northern Premier League Division One Midlands club Belper Town.

== Personal life ==
Born in England, Kuleya is of Zimbabwean descent.
