= 2026–27 Doncaster Rovers F.C. season =

148th season in existence of Doncaster Rovers FC

Doncaster Rovers
2026–27 season
- Owner: Doncaster Rovers Limited
- Chairman: Terry Bramall
- Manager: Grant McCann
- Stadium: Eco-Power Stadium

The 2026–27 season is the 148th season in the history of Doncaster Rovers Football Club and their second consecutive season in League One. The club are participating in League One, the FA Cup, the EFL Cup, and the EFL Trophy.

== Transfers and contracts ==
=== In ===
Date	Pos.	Player	From	Fee	Ref.
1 July 2026 (Note: The transfer was announced on 20 May, and would become official on July 1 once Ayinde's contract at Ipswich Town had expired)	LW	(Republic of Ireland) Leon Ayinde	(England) Ipswich Town	Free	
1 July 2026 (Note: The transfer was announced on 9 June, and would become official on July 1 once Byrne's contract at Bradford City had expired)	CB	(Republic of Ireland) Neill Byrne	(England) Bradford City	Free	
1 July 2026 (Note: The transfer was announced on 22 May, and would become official on July 1 once Husband's contract at Blackpool had expired)	LB	(England) James Husband	(England) Blackpool	Free	
1 July 2026 (Note: The transfer was announced on 26 June, and would become official on July 1 once Okoronkwo's contract at Everton had expired)	CF	(England) Francis Okoronkwo	(England) Everton	Free	
20 July 2026	CM	(England) Isaac Hutchinson	(England) Bristol Rovers	Undisclosed	
28 July 2026	RW	(England) Jordan Thomas	(England) Cheltenham Town	Free	
6 September 2026	GK	(Northern Ireland) Josh Clarke	(Scotland) Partick Thistle	Undisclosed	
13 October 2026	CF	(Republic of Ireland) Will Keane	(England) Preston North End	Free	

=== Out ===
Date	Pos.	Player	To	Fee	Ref.
28 July 2026	CB	(England) Will Flint	(England) FC Halifax Town	Undisclosed	
28 July 2026	RW	(England) Luke Molyneux	(England) Salford City	Undisclosed	
1 September 2026	LW	(Scotland) Glenn Middleton	(England) Rochdale	Undisclosed	

=== Loaned in ===
Date	Pos.	Player	From	Loaned until	Ref.
19 June 2026	CF	(England) Alfie May	(England) Huddersfield Town	End of Season	
25 June 2026	GK	(England) Tommy Simkin	(England) Stoke City	End of Season	
7 July 2026	GK	(Northern Ireland) Josh Clarke	(Scotland) Partick Thistle	6 September 2026 (Note: On 6 September, Clarke's initial half-season loan was made permanent.)	
26 August 2026	CAM	(England) Tommi O'Reilly	(England) Aston Villa	End of Season	
1 September 2026	CF	(Republic of Ireland) James Collins	(England) Lincoln City	2 January 2027	

=== Loaned out ===
Date	Pos.	Player	To	Loaned until	Ref.
16 July 2026	CB	(England) Bobby Faulkner	(England) Tranmere Rovers	End of Season (Note: A mid-season break clause available in the deal.)	
1 August 2026	CM	(England) Sam Straughan-Brown	(England) Spalding United	2 January 2027 (Note: On 4 September, Straughan-Brown's initial one-month loan was extended until January.)	
7 August 2026	CB	(England) Kasper Williams	(England) Alfreton Town	2 January 2027 (Note: On 10 September, Williams' initial one-month loan was extended until January.)	
17 August 2026	CAM	(England) Alex Pavan	(England) Pontefract Collieries	30 October 2026 (Note: On 30 October, Pavan was recalled back from his initial half-season loan at Pontefract Collieries and subsequently loaned to Cleethorpes Town.)	
3 September 2026	RB	(England) Liam Potts	(England) Retford		
4 September 2026	GK	(England) Jake Oram	(England) Spennymoor Town	3 October 2026	
19 September 2026	CB	(England) Lincoln Pawlak	(England) Blyth Spartans	30 October 2026	
17 October 2026	CM	(England) Joshua Butler	(England) Pickering Town	14 November 2026	
17 October 2026	CF	(England) Ethan Hodgett	(England) Grimsby Borough	10 December 2026 (Note: On 12 November, Tomlinson's and Hodgett's initial one-month loans at Grimsby Borough was extended for a further 28-days.)	
17 October 2026	CM	(England) Lucas McKie	(England) Rossington Main	14 November 2026	
17 October 2026	RB	(England) Liam Potts	(England) Pickering Town	14 November 2026	
17 October 2026	CM	(England) Ashton Swales	(England) Ashton United	14 November 2026	
17 October 2026	CB	(England) Jonny Tomlinson	(England) Grimsby Borough	10 December 2026	
24 October 2026	GK	(England) Jake Oram	(England) Chorley	20 November 2026	
30 October 2026	CB	(England) Lincoln Pawlak	(England) Ossett United	5 January 2027	
30 October 2026	CAM	(England) Alex Pavan	(England) Cleethorpes Town	30 November 2026	
20 November 2026	GK	(England) Jake Oram	(England) Guiseley	18 December 2026	

=== Released / out of contract ===
Date	Pos.	Player	Subsequent club	Joined date	Ref.
30 June 2026	RM	(England) Jordan Gibson	(England) Crewe Alexandra	1 July 2026	
30 June 2026	LB	(Scotland) James Maxwell	(England) Northampton Town	1 July 2026	
30 June 2026	CM	(England) Zain Westbrooke	(England) Yeovil Town	1 July 2026	
30 June 2026	LW	(England) Kyle Hurst	(England) Scunthorpe United	1 July 2026	
30 June 2026	CAM	(England) Joe Sbarra	(England) Solihull Moors	1 July 2026	
30 June 2026	CM	(England) Franklin Middleton	(England) Barnsley	29 July 2026	
30 June 2026	CF	(England) Billy Sharp	Retired	11 Oct 2026	
30 June 2026	CM	(England) Ben Close			

=== New contract ===
Date	Pos.	Player	Contract until	Ref.
8 May 2026	LB	(England) Jack Senior	30 June 2028	
21 May 2026	GK	(England) Jake Oram	30 June 2027 (Note: Option to extend for a further year)	
1 July 2026 (Note: Contract agreement was announced on 13 May, and would become official on July 1)	CAM	(England) Alex Pavan	Undisclosed (Note: First professional contract)	
1 July 2026	CB	(England) Lincoln Pawlak	Undisclosed	
6 August 2026	CDM	(England) Owen Bailey	30 June 2029	
5 November 2026	CM	(England) Robbie Gotts	30 June 2029	

== Pre-season and friendlies ==
On 19 May, Rovers announced a pre-season tour to Dublin between 12–18 July. On 5 June, a friendly versus Lincoln City was confirmed. Six days later, two friendlies against Harrogate Town and Gainsborough Trinity for the same date were confirmed. On 24 June, a home friendly against Wolverhampton Wanderers was announced.

Win Draw Loss Fixtures

14 July 2026 Friendly	St Patrick's Athletic	2–4	Doncaster Rovers	Dublin, Republic of Ireland
19:30 BST	Rooney 69' (pen.); McClelland 77'	Report	Pearson 15'; Molyneux 17' (pen.); Hanlan 33', 83'	Stadium: Richmond Park

16 July 2026 Friendly	Glenavon	0–5	Doncaster Rovers	Lurgan, Northern Ireland
19:30 BST		Report	Bailey 15'; May 25'; Ayinde 31'; Clifton 39'; Nixon 68'	Stadium: Mourneview Park

18 July 2026 Friendly	Linfield	0–2	Doncaster Rovers	Belfast, Northern Ireland
15:00 BST		Report	McCann 7'; May 23'	Stadium: Windsor Park

25 July 2026 Friendly	Harrogate Town	2–2	Doncaster Rovers	Harrogate
12:00 BST	Burrell 31'; McGowan 40'	Report	McCann 59'; Bailey 69'	Stadium: Marcy Fitness Stadium

25 July 2026 Friendly	Gainsborough Trinity	0–0	Doncaster Rovers	Gainsborough
16:00 BST		Report		Stadium: KAL Group Stadium

29 July 2026 Friendly	Doncaster Rovers	0–2	Wolverhampton Wanderers	Doncaster
19:30 BST		Report	López 81'; Chirewa 85'	Stadium: Club Doncaster Sports Village; Attendance: 3,641 (1,074 away); Referee: Tom Nield

1 August 2026 Friendly	Doncaster Rovers	0–1	Lincoln City	Doncaster
15:00 BST		Report	Thorn 49'	Stadium: Club Doncaster Sports Village; Attendance: 2,455 (306 away); Referee: Seb Stockbridge

== Competitions ==
=== League One ===
==== League table ====
Pos	Team	Pld	W	D	L	GF	GA	GD	Pts	Promotion, qualification or relegation
18	AFC Wimbledon	15	4	4	7	11	25	−14	16	
19	Notts County	13	3	5	5	13	15	−2	14	
20	Doncaster Rovers	14	3	4	7	16	24	−8	13	
21	Peterborough United	14	3	4	7	13	23	−10	13	Relegation to EFL League Two
22	Blackpool	14	3	3	8	18	24	−6	12	Relegation to EFL League Two

Updated to match(es) played on 21 November 2026. Source: EFL Official Website
Rules for classification: 1) Points; 2) Goal difference; 3) Number of goals scored; 4) Head-to-head results; 5) Wins; 6) Away goals; 7) Penalty points (sec 9.5); 8) 12-point sending off offences

==== Results summary ====
Overall								Home						Away					
Pld	W	D	L	GF	GA	GD	Pts	W	D	L	GF	GA	GD	W	D	L	GF	GA	GD
14	3	4	7	16	24	−8	13	2	2	2	6	6	0	1	2	5	10	18	−8

Last updated: 21 November 2026.
Source: Soccerway

==== Results by round ====
Round	1	2	3	4	5	6	7	10	11	12	13	9^{2}	14	15^{3}	16	17	18	19	8^{1}	20	21	22	23	24	25	26
Ground	A	H	A	H	H	A	A	H	A	H	H	A	A	H	A	H	A	H	H	H	A	A	H	H	A	A
Result	L	D	D	D	L	L	W	W	L	L	W	L	L	P	D											
Position	19	19	20	20	22	23	21	16	17	19	17	18	20	P	20											
Points	0	1	2	3	3	3	6	9	9	9	12	12	12	P	13											

Source: EFL
A = Away; H = Home; W = Win; D = Draw; L = Loss; P = Postponed
Notes:
- ^{1} Matchday 8 (vs. Oxford United) was postponed due to international call-ups.
- ^{2} Matchday 9 (vs. Luton Town) was postponed due to international call-ups.
- ^{3} Matchday 15 (vs. Leyton Orient) was postponed due to international call-ups.

==== Matches ====
On 25 June, the League One fixtures were revealed.

Win Draw Loss Fixtures

15 August 2026 1	Mansfield Town	2–1	Doncaster Rovers	Mansfield
	Oates 26'; Reed 74'; Blake-Tracy (yellow card) 82'; Thompson (yellow card) 86'	Report	Senior 49'; Grehan (yellow card) 56'	Stadium: One Call Stadium; Attendance: 8,860 (1,607 away); Referee: Dean Whitestone

22 August 2026 2	Doncaster Rovers	0–0	Barnsley	Doncaster
	Thomas (yellow card) 61'	Report	Earl (yellow card) 83'	Stadium: Club Doncaster Sports Village; Attendance: 10,288 (2,676 away); Referee: David Webb
Note: Fixture was initially scheduled for a 15:00 kick-off, but was brought forward for live Sky Sports.

29 August 2026 3	Stevenage	2–2	Doncaster Rovers	Stevenage
	Magennis 57'; Sanderson 82'	Report	Hutchinson (yellow card) 40'; McGrath (yellow card) 56'; Senior 70', (yellow card) 76'; Bailey 80'	Stadium: Stevenage FC Stadium; Attendance: 3,139 (577 away); Referee: Oliver Yates

1 September 2026 4	Doncaster Rovers	1–1	Notts County	Doncaster
	Hutchinson 36'; Senior (yellow card) 44'; Clifton (yellow card) 88'	Report	Lipsiuc (yellow card) 45'; Cooper 64', (yellow card) 76'; Bedeau (yellow card) 88'	Stadium: Club Doncaster Sports Village; Referee: Zac Kennard-Kettle

5 September 2026 5	Doncaster Rovers	2–3	Plymouth Argyle	Doncaster
	May 51' (pen.); Byrne (yellow card) 71'; Hutchinson (yellow card) 79'; Senior (yellow card) 86'; Grehan 90+5'	Report	Evans 28'; Pepple 74'; Watts 83'	Stadium: Club Doncaster Sports Village; Referee: Matthew Corlett

12 September 2026 6	AFC Wimbledon	1–0	Doncaster Rovers	Wimbledon
	Stockley (yellow card) 27'; Hippolyte 43', (yellow card) 84'	Report	Aydine (yellow card) 31'; Bailey (yellow card) 76'; Simkin (yellow card) 90+4'	Stadium: The Cherry Red Records Stadium; Attendance: 7,426; Referee: Elliot Swallow

19 September 2026 7	Peterborough United	0–2	Doncaster Rovers	Peterborough
	Feeney (yellow card) 36'; Leonard (yellow card) 90+2'	Report	May 15'; Hutchinson 88'; Senior (yellow card) 90+2'	Stadium: Weston Homes Stadium; Attendance: 7,935 (1,107 away); Referee: William Davis

10 October 2026 10	Doncaster Rovers	1–0	Burton Albion	Doncaster
	Bailey (yellow card) 41'; Ayinde 45+2'; Gotts (yellow card) 70'; Adelakun (yellow card) 89'		Dennis (yellow card) 39'; Araujo (yellow card) 84'	Stadium: Club Doncaster Sports Village; Referee: Harrison Blair

17 October 2026 11	Leicester City	2–1	Doncaster Rovers	Leicester
	Thomas (yellow card) 17'; Lundstram 45+1'; Doyle 61'	Report	May (yellow card) 57'; McGrath (yellow card) 59'; Ayinde (yellow card) 65'; O'Hora 84' (o.g.)	Stadium: King Power Stadium; Referee: Carl Brook

20 October 2026 12	Doncaster Rovers	0–2	Stockport County	Doncaster
19:45 BST	Bailey (yellow card) 21'; Robinson (yellow card) 90+1'	Report	Diamond (yellow card) 49'; Jobe 53'; Norwood (penalty missed) 58'; Wootton 59'	Stadium: Club Doncaster Sports Village; Referee: Alan Young

24 October 2026 13	Doncaster Rovers	2–0	Sheffield Wednesday	Doncaster
15:00 BST	Bailey 7', 16'; Gotts (yellow card) 73'	Report	Al-Hamadi (yellow card) 14'; Mitchell (yellow card) 86'	Stadium: Club Doncaster Sports Village; Attendance: 11,257; Referee: Ross Martin

27 October 2026 9	Luton Town	3–1	Doncaster Rovers	Luton
19:45 GMT	Donley (yellow card) 30', (goal) 52', 72'; Marshall 44' (pen.)	Report	Sterry (yellow card) 11'; Bailey (yellow card) 60'; McCann 84'; Thomas (yellow card) 90+3'	Stadium: Kenilworth Road; Attendance: 9,707; Referee: Matthew Russell
Note: Fixture was initially scheduled for 3 October, but was rearranged due to international call-ups.

31 October 2026 14	Milton Keynes Dons	6–1	Doncaster Rovers	Denbigh
15:00 GMT	Collins 2', 21', 69', 76'; Crowley (yellow card) 44'; Jones (yellow card) 72'; Paterson 81'; Ekpiteta 89'	Report	Hutchinson (yellow card) 56'; Thomas 64', (yellow card) 80'; Gotts (yellow card) 88'	Stadium: Stadium MK; Attendance: 7,732; Referee: Andrew Humphries

14 November 2026 15	Doncaster Rovers	Postponed	Leyton Orient	Doncaster
15:00 GMT				Stadium: Club Doncaster Sports Village
Note: Fixture was postponed due to international call-ups.

21 November 2026 16	Bradford City	2–2	Doncaster Rovers	Bradford
15:00 GMT	Powell 55'; Touray (yellow card) 59'; Humphrys 78'	Report	Pearson (yellow card) 1'; Thomas 745'; Grehan 90+5'	Stadium: Mbanq Valley Parade; Attendance: 19,836; Referee: Darren Drysdale

26 November 2026 17	Doncaster Rovers	v	Huddersfield Town	Doncaster
20:00 GMT				Stadium: Club Doncaster Sports Village
Note: Fixture was initially scheduled for 28 November, but was brought forward a couple days for live Sky Sports broadcasting.

1 December 2026 18	Reading	v	Doncaster Rovers	Reading
19:45 GMT				Stadium: Select Car Leasing Stadium

12 December 2026 19	Doncaster Rovers	v	Bromley	Doncaster
15:00 GMT				Stadium: Club Doncaster Sports Village

15 December 2026 8	Doncaster Rovers	v	Oxford United	Doncaster
19:45 GMT				Stadium: Club Doncaster Sports Village
Note: Fixture was initially scheduled for 26 September, but was rearranged due to international call-ups.

26 December 2026 21	Doncaster Rovers	v	Wigan Athletic	Doncaster
15:00 GMT				Stadium: Club Doncaster Sports Village

29 December 2026 22	Cambridge United	v	Doncaster Rovers	Cambridge
19:45 GMT				Stadium: Cledara Abbey Stadium

1 January 2027 23	Blackpool	v	Doncaster Rovers	Blackpool
15:00 GMT				Stadium: Bloomfield Road

9 January 2027 24	Doncaster Rovers	v	Wycombe Wanderers	Doncaster
15:00 GMT				Stadium: Club Doncaster Sports Village

16 January 2027 25	Doncaster Rovers	v	Leicester City	Doncaster
15:00 GMT				Stadium: Club Doncaster Sports Village

19 January 2027 26	Stockport County	v	Doncaster Rovers	Edgeley
19:45 GMT				Stadium: Edgeley Park

23 January 2027 27	Sheffield Wednesday	v	Doncaster Rovers	Owlerton
12:30 GMT				Stadium: Hillsborough
Note: Fixture was initially scheduled for a 15:00 kick-off, but was brought forward for live Sky Sports broadcasting.

=== FA Cup ===
Doncaster were drawn away to Kidderminster Harriers in the first round.

Win Draw Loss Fixtures

7 November 2026 First round	Kidderminster Harriers	3–0	Doncaster Rovers	Kidderminster
15:00 GMT	Walker 22'; Kouhyar 36'; Davis 59'	Report	Gotts (yellow card) 79'; May (yellow card) 90'	Stadium: Aggborough; Attendance: 3,786 (675 away); Referee: Declan Bourne

=== EFL Cup ===
Doncaster were drawn away to Stockport County in the first round and home to Middlesbrough in the second round.

Win Draw Loss Fixtures

8 August 2026 First round	Stockport County	1–1 (4–5 p)	Doncaster Rovers	Edgeley
15:00 BST	Wootton 51'	Report	May 50'; Bailey (yellow card) 83'	Stadium: Edgeley Park; Attendance: 4,974 (892 away); Referee: Leigh Doughty
	Penalties
	Osborn (penalty missed); Andresson (penalty scored); Wootton (penalty scored); Fiorini (penalty scored); Adigun (penalty scored); O'Connell (penalty missed)		May (penalty scored); Broadbent (penalty scored); Bailey (penalty scored); Clifton (penalty missed); Sterry (penalty scored); Adelakun (penalty scored)

25 August 2026 Second round	Doncaster Rovers	1–3	Middlesbrough	Doncaster
19:30 BST	Gotts (yellow card) 26'; Broadbent (yellow card) 77'; Hutchinson 90+2'		Joseph 34'; Peart-Harris (yellow card) 45'; Neto Borges (yellow card) 45+1'; Lankshear 78'; Sarmiento 87'	Stadium: Club Doncaster Sports Village; Referee: Edward Duckworth

=== EFL Trophy ===
==== Group stage ====
Doncaster were drawn against Huddersfield Town, Rochdale and Liverpool U21 into Northern Group H.

Pos	Div	Team	Pld	W	PW	PL	L	GF	GA	GD	Pts	Qualification
1	L1	Huddersfield Town	3	3	0	0	0	12	1	+11	9	Advance to Round 2
2	L1	Doncaster Rovers	3	2	0	0	1	6	4	+2	6	Advance to Round 2
3	ACA	Liverpool U21	3	0	1	0	2	3	8	−5	2	
4	L2	Rochdale	3	0	0	1	2	4	12	−8	1	

Source: EFL

Win Draw Loss Fixtures

8 September 2026 Group stage	Doncaster Rovers	1–3	Huddersfield Town	Doncaster
19:00 BST	Broadbent (yellow card) 7'; Ayinde 40'	Report	Mumba (yellow card) 32'; Spencer 67'; Low 74'; Sørensen 77'; Bowat (yellow card) 83'	Stadium: Club Doncaster Sports Village; Referee: Richard Eley

6 October 2026 Group stage	Doncaster Rovers	1–0	Liverpool U21	Doncaster
19:00 BST	O'Reilly 45+1'; Gotts (yellow card) 71'		McConnell (yellow card) 39'; Onanuga (yellow card) 90+4'	Stadium: Club Doncaster Sports Village; Referee: Richard Aspinall

3 November 2026 Group stage	Rochdale	1–4	Doncaster Rovers	Spotland
19:00 GMT	Henderson 15'; Hannant (yellow card) 67'	Report	May 54'; Hanlan 63'; Clifton (yellow card) 74'; Bailey 88'; Hutchinson 90+2'	Stadium: Crown Oil Arena; Attendance: 645 (202 away); Referee: Martin Woods

== Statistics ==
=== Appearances and goals ===
As of match played 21 November 2026

Players with no appearances are not included on the list; italics indicated loaned in player

No.	Pos	Nat	Player	Total		League One		FA Cup		EFL Cup		EFL Trophy	
No.	Pos	Nat	Player	Apps	Goals	Apps	Goals	Apps	Goals	Apps	Goals	Apps	Goals
1	GK	(England) ENG	Tommy Simkin	15	0	14+0	0	0+0	0	1+0	0	0+0	0
2	DF	(England) ENG	Jamie Sterry	7	0	5+0	0	0+0	0	2+0	0	0+0	0
3	DF	(England) ENG	James Husband	5	0	2+1	0	0+0	0	0+0	0	2+0	0
4	MF	(England) ENG	Owen Bailey	19	4	14+0	3	1+0	0	1+1	0	1+1	1
5	DF	(England) ENG	Matty Pearson	3	0	2+0	0	0+0	0	0+0	0	1+0	0
6	DF	(Republic of Ireland) IRL	Jay McGrath	13	0	8+0	0	1+0	0	2+0	0	1+1	0
7	MF	(England) ENG	Tommi O'Reilly	6	1	3+2	0	0+0	0	0+0	0	1+0	1
8	MF	(England) ENG	George Broadbent	17	0	9+4	0	0+0	0	1+1	0	2+0	0
9	FW	(England) ENG	Brandon Hanlan	20	1	7+7	0	1+0	0	0+2	0	3+0	1
10	FW	(Republic of Ireland) IRL	Alfie May	17	4	11+2	2	1+0	0	2+0	1	0+1	1
11	FW	(Republic of Ireland) IRL	Leon Ayinde	17	2	8+5	1	0+1	0	1+1	0	1+0	1
12	DF	(Republic of Ireland) IRL	Neill Byrne	17	0	13+1	0	1+0	0	1+0	0	1+0	0
15	MF	(Wales) WAL	Harry Clifton	11	0	0+6	0	1+0	0	0+1	0	2+1	0
16	DF	(England) ENG	Tom Nixon	6	0	2+1	0	1+0	0	0+0	0	2+0	0
17	FW	(Republic of Ireland) IRL	James Collins	1	0	0+1	0	0+0	0	0+0	0	0+0	0
18	FW	(Republic of Ireland) IRL	Will Keane	6	0	2+3	0	0+0	0	0+0	0	1+0	0
19	FW	(England) ENG	Jordan Thomas	15	2	4+5	2	1+0	0	1+1	0	2+1	0
20	MF	(Northern Ireland) NIR	Darren Robinson	6	0	1+1	0	0+1	0	1+0	0	2+0	0
21	MF	(England) ENG	Isaac Hutchinson	20	4	9+5	2	0+1	0	2+0	1	1+2	1
22	MF	(England) ENG	Robbie Gotts	18	0	13+1	0	1+0	0	1+0	0	2+0	0
23	DF	(England) ENG	Jack Senior	15	2	11+0	2	1+0	0	2+0	0	1+0	0
25	DF	(Northern Ireland) NIR	Bayley McCann	14	1	1+9	1	0+0	0	1+1	0	2+0	0
27	DF	(Republic of Ireland) IRL	Seán Grehan	17	2	11+2	2	0+0	0	1+1	0	2+0	0
38	MF	(England) ENG	Alex Pavan	1	0	0+0	0	0+0	0	0+0	0	0+1	0
39	DF	(England) ENG	Lincoln Pawlak	1	0	0+0	0	0+0	0	0+0	0	0+1	0
42	GK	(Northern Ireland) NIR	Josh Clarke	5	0	0+0	0	1+0	0	1+0	0	3+0	0
46	MF	(England) ENG	Jonny Tomlinson	1	0	0+0	0	0+0	0	0+0	0	0+1	0
47	FW	(England) ENG	Hakeeb Adelakun	16	0	4+6	0	0+1	0	1+1	0	0+3	0
48	MF	(England) ENG	Ashton Swales	1	0	0+0	0	0+0	0	0+0	0	0+1	0
50	FW	(England) ENG	Dylan Hartley	1	0	0+0	0	0+0	0	0+0	0	0+1	0
