= 2025–26 Doncaster Rovers F.C. season =

147th season in existence of Doncaster Rovers FC

Doncaster Rovers
2025–26 season
- Owner: Doncaster Rovers Limited
- Chairman: Terry Bramall
- Manager: Grant McCann
- Stadium: Eco-Power Stadium
- League One: 17th

The 2025–26 season was the 147th season in the history of Doncaster Rovers Football Club and their first season back in League One since the 2021–22 season following promotion from League Two in the preceding season. The club participated in League One, the FA Cup, the EFL Cup, and the EFL Trophy.

== Transfers and contracts ==
=== In ===
Date	Pos.	Player	From	Fee	Ref.
24 June 2025	CB	(Republic of Ireland) Seán Grehan	(England) Crystal Palace	Undisclosed	
1 July 2025 (Note: The transfer was announced on 15 May, and would become official on July 1 once his Barrow contract had expired)	CM	(England) Robbie Gotts	(England) Barrow	Free	
1 July 2025 (Note: The transfer was announced on 13 June, and would become official on July 1 once his Wycombe contract had expired)	CF	(England) Brandon Hanlan	(England) Wycombe Wanderers	Free	
1 July 2025 (Note: The transfer was announced on 3 June, and would become official on July 1 once his Dundee United contract had expired)	LW	(Scotland) Glenn Middleton	(Scotland) Dundee United	Free	
1 July 2025 (Note: The transfer was announced on 12 June, and would become official on July 1 once his Huddersfield contract had expired)	CB	(England) Matty Pearson	(England) Huddersfield Town	Free	
2 January 2026	LB	(Northern Ireland) Bayley McCann	(England) Barnsley	Undisclosed	
2 January 2026	CDM	(Northern Ireland) Darren Robinson	(England) Derby County	Free transfer	
6 January 2026	RW	(England) Hakeeb Adelakun	(England) Cheltenham Town	Free	

=== Out ===
Date	Pos.	Player	To	Fee	Ref.
1 September 2025	CF	(England) Joe Ironside	(England) Tranmere Rovers	Undisclosed	
10 January 2026	GK	(Republic of Ireland) Ian Lawlor	(England) Crewe Alexandra	Free Transfer	

=== Loaned in ===
Date	Pos.	Player	From	Date until	Ref.
16 June 2025	GK	(France) Thimothée Lo-Tutala	(England) Hull City	31 May 2026	
24 June 2025	RW	(England) Damola Ajayi	(England) Tottenham Hotspur	1 January 2026 (Note: On 23 December, it was announced that Ajayi would be recalled to Tottenham in January)	
27 June 2025	CB	(Republic of Ireland) Connor O'Riordan	(England) Blackburn Rovers	5 January 2026 (Note: On 23 December, it was announced that O'Riordan would be recalled to Blackburn on 5 January)	
5 August 2025	CDM	(Wales) Charlie Crew	(England) Leeds United	1 January 2026 (Note: On 23 December, it was announced that Crew would be recalled to Leeds in January)	
30 August 2025	CF	(England) Toyosi Olusanya	(United States) Houston Dynamo	6 January 2026	
6 January 2026	CF	(England) Francis Okoronkwo	(England) Everton	6 March 2026 (Note: On 6 March, Okoronkwo returned to Everton due to a hamstring injury ruling him out for the rest of the season)	
10 January 2026	GK	(Scotland) Zander Clark	(Scotland) Heart of Midlothian	31 May 2026	
26 January 2026	CB	(Republic of Ireland) Neill Byrne	(England) Bradford City	31 May 2026	
2 February 2026	CAM	(England) Elliot Lee	(Wales) Wrexham	31 May 2026	

=== Loaned out ===
Date	Pos.	Player	To	Date until	Ref.
1 July 2025	CM	(England) Sam Straughan-Brown	(England) Peterborough Sports	25 March 2026 (Note: On 25 March, Straughan-Brown was recalled from his season-long loan at Peterborough Sports)	
2 July 2025	CB	(England) Bobby Faulkner	(England) Harrogate Town	31 May 2026	
24 July 2025	CM	(England) Will Flint	(England) Gateshead	9 February 2026 (Note: On 9 February, Flint was recalled from his season-long loan at Gateshead and subsequently joined Buxton on loan)	
31 July 2025	CB	(England) Kasper Williams	(England) Bridlington Town	11 September 2025	
8 August 2025	LW	(England) Kyle Hurst	(England) Gateshead	2 January 2026	
1 October 2025	CM	(England) Zain Westbrooke	(England) Scunthorpe United	31 May 2026 (Note: On 8 January, Westbrooke's loan at Scunthorpe United was extended until the end of the season)	
13 November 2025	CAM	(England) Joe Sbarra	(England) Solihull Moors	31 May 2026 (Note: On 13 January, Sbarra's loan at Solihull Moors was extended until the end of the season)	
22 December 2025	GK	(England) Jake Oram	(England) Hallam	19 January 2026	
24 December 2025	CB	(England) Kasper Williams	(England) Stocksbridge Park Steels	21 January 2026	
27 December 2025	CB	(England) Aaron Cashmore	(England) Stamford	Work Experience	
1 January 2026	CF	(England) Rhomani Murray	(England) Bottesford Town	Work Experience	
1 January 2026	CM	(England) Harry Glaves	(England) Pickering Town	Work Experience	
1 January 2026	CF	(England) Ethan Hodgett	(England) Gainsborough Trinity	Work Experience	
1 January 2026	CM	(England) Franklin Middleton	(England) Ossett United	Work Experience	
1 January 2026	CM	(England) Deshaun Musgrave-Dore	(England) Bridlington Town	Work Experience	
2 January 2026	LB	(Northern Ireland) Bayley McCann	(England) Alfreton Town	25 March 2026 (Note: On 25 March, McCann was recalled from his half-season long loan at Alfreton Town)	
8 January 2026	LW	(England) Kyle Hurst	(England) Scunthorpe United	31 May 2026	
3 February 2026	GK	(England) Jake Oram	(England) Bradford (Park Avenue)	4 February 2026 (Note: On 4 February, Oram was recalled from his loan at Bradford (Park Avenue))	
9 February 2026	CB	(England) Will Flint	(England) Buxton	31 May 2026	

=== Released / Out of Contract ===
Date	Pos.	Player	Subsequent club	Join date	Ref.
30 June 2025	CB	(England) Tom Anderson	(England) Shrewsbury Town	1 July 2025	
30 June 2025	CF	(England) Jack Goodman	(England) Basford United	1 July 2025	
30 June 2025	CB	(England) Joseph Olowu	(England) Stockport County	1 July 2025	
30 June 2025	RW	(England) Tavonga Kuleya	(England) Belper Town	6 July 2025	
30 June 2025	AM	(England) Jack Degruchy	(England) Stoskbridge Park Steels	17 July 2025	
30 June 2025	LB	(England) Freddie Allen			
30 June 2025	CB	(England) Richard Wood	Retired		

=== New Contract ===
Date	Pos.	Player	Contract until	Ref.
4 June 2025	GK	(England) Jacob Bryant	30 June 2026 (Note: Option of an additional year)	
4 June 2025	CM	(England) Sam Straughan-Brown	30 June 2027 (Note: First professional contract)	
4 June 2025	CB	(England) Kasper Williams	30 June 2027	
5 June 2025	CB	(England) Bobby Faulkner	30 June 2026	
4 July 2025	DM	(England) George Broadbent	30 June 2027	
10 July 2025	CB	(Republic of Ireland) Jay McGrath	30 June 2028	
8 October 2025	CB	(England) Lincoln Pawlak	30 June 2027	
24 April 2026	CAM	(England) Alex Pavan	30 June 2027	
29 April 2026	GK	(England) Jacob Bryant	30 June 2027	
29 April 2026	CM	(Wales) Harry Clifton	30 June 2027	
29 April 2026	CB	(England) Bobby Faulkner	30 June 2027	
29 April 2026	CB	(England) Will Flint	30 June 2027	

== Pre-season and friendlies ==
On 27 May, Doncaster Rovers confirmed their first two pre-season friendlies, a double-header against Stamford and Peterborough Sports. A week later, a match against Milton Keynes Dons at a neutral venue was confirmed. A fourth fixture was added, against Gateshead. On 20 June, two further friendlies were confirmed against Blackpool and Alfreton Town.

Win Draw Loss Fixtures

8 July 2025 Friendly	Alfreton Town	2–3	Doncaster Rovers	Alfreton
19:00 BST	Clackstone 33' (pen.); Trialist 102'	Report	Ajayi 45'; Broadbent 74'; Hanlan 92'	Stadium: North Street
Note: 120-minute match.

12 July 2025 Friendly	Stamford	0–5	Doncaster Rovers	Stamford
12:00 BST		Report	Hanlan 29'; Ajayi 33', 87'; Senior 52'; Clifton 55'	Stadium: Zeeco Stadium

12 July 2025 Friendly	Peterborough Sports	1–1	Doncaster Rovers	Peterborough
15:00 BST	Booth 28'	Report	Gibson 49'	Stadium: Lincoln Road

15 July 2025 Friendly	Gateshead	0–7	Doncaster Rovers	Wokingham
13:00 BST		Report	Sharp 17', 33' (pen.); Bailey 26'; Middleton 61' (pen.), 70'; Sbarra 62', 75'	Stadium: Cantley Park; Attendance: 0 (behind-closed-doors)
Note: Fixture was originally schedued to take place at Gateshead International Stadium, but was moved to behind-closed-doors at an alternative venue due to concerns over the playing surface.

19 July 2025 Friendly	Milton Keynes Dons	1–3	Doncaster Rovers	Dunstable
15:00 BST	Thompson-Sommers 29'	Report	Ajayi 19'; Molyneux 27'; Hanlan 33'	Stadium: Creasey Park

26 July 2025 Friendly	Doncaster Rovers	1–1	Blackpool	Doncaster
15:00 BST	Bailey 51'	Report	Fletcher 26'	Stadium: Eco-Power Stadium

== Competitions ==
=== League One ===
==== League table ====
Pos	Team	Pld	W	D	L	GF	GA	GD	Pts
12	Reading	46	16	15	15	64	60	+4	63
13	Blackpool	46	17	9	20	54	65	−11	60
14	Doncaster Rovers	46	17	9	20	50	69	−19	60
15	Barnsley	46	15	14	17	68	73	−5	59
16	Wigan Athletic	46	14	14	18	49	58	−9	56

Source: EFL Official Website
Rules for classification: 1) Points; 2) Goal difference; 3) Number of goals scored; 4) Head-to-head results; 5) Wins; 6) Away goals; 7) Penalty points (sec 9.5); 8) 12-point sending off offences

==== Results summary ====
Overall								Home						Away					
Pld	W	D	L	GF	GA	GD	Pts	W	D	L	GF	GA	GD	W	D	L	GF	GA	GD
46	17	9	20	50	69	−19	60	9	6	8	27	32	−5	8	3	12	23	37	−14

Last updated: complete.
Source: Soccerway

==== Results by round ====
Round	1	2	3	4	5	6	7	8	9	10	11	12	13	14	15	16	17	18	19	20	21	22	23	24	27	28	29	30	26^{2}	31	33	34	35	36	25^{1}	37	38	39	32^{3}	41	42	43	44	40^{4}	45	46
Ground	H	A	H	A	A	H	H	A	H	A	H	A	H	A	H	A	A	H	H	A	H	A	A	H	A	H	H	A	A	A	H	A	H	A	H	H	A	A	H	H	A	H	A	H	H	A
Result	W	W	D	L	W	W	W	L	L	L	D	L	L	D	L	L	D	W	L	L	L	L	L	D	W	D	W	L	W	L	W	W	L	L	D	W	D	W	W	L	L	W	W	L	D	W
Position	10	6	5	10	8	5	2	5	7	9	10	10	12	12	18	19	19	18	19	20	23	23	23	23	22	22	21	22	17	20	18	17	18	18	18	17	17	17	15	17	17	15	14	15	15	14
Points	3	6	7	7	10	13	16	16	16	16	17	17	17	18	18	18	18	21	21	21	21	23	23	24	27	28	31	31	34	34	37	40	40	40	41	44	45	48	51	51	51	54	57	57	58	61

Source: EFL
A = Away; H = Home; W = Win; D = Draw; L = Loss; P = Postponed
Notes:
- ^{1} Matchday 25 (vs. Luton Town) was postponed due to a frozen pitch and then due to oppositions reinstatement in the EFL Trophy.
- ^{2} Matchday 26 (vs. Burton Albion) was postponed due to both clubs in FA Cup involvements.
- ^{3} Matchday 32 (vs. Port Vale) was postponed due to their FA Cup involvements.
- ^{4} Matchday 40 (vs. Lincoln City) was postponed due to international call-ups.

==== Matches ====
On 26 June, the League One fixtures were announced, with Doncaster hosting Exeter City on the opening weekend.

Win Draw Loss Fixtures

2 August 2025 1	Doncaster Rovers	1–0	Exeter City	Doncaster
15:00 BST	Molyneux 88' (pen.)	Report		Stadium: Eco-Power Stadium; Attendance: 8,688; Referee: Ross Joyce

9 August 2025 2	Mansfield Town	1–2	Doncaster Rovers	Mansfield
15:00 BST	McAdam (yellow card) 19'; McLaughlin 57'; Bowery (yellow card) 90+7'	Report	Crew (yellow card) 55'; Bailey 76', 90+6'	Stadium: Field Mill; Attendance: 8,798; Referee: Andrew Humphries

16 August 2025 3	Doncaster Rovers	1–1	Wycombe Wanderers	Doncaster
15:00 BST	Sharp 56'; O'Riordan (yellow card) 75'; Bailey (yellow card) 84'; Broadbent (yellow card) 90+2'	Report	Mullins (yellow card) 30'; Quitirna 71'; Onyedinma (yellow card) 90+3'	Stadium: Eco-Power Stadium; Referee: Martin Coy

19 August 2025 4	Huddersfield Town	2–0	Doncaster Rovers	Doncaster
19:45 BST	Wallace (yellow card) 27'; Ledson (yellow card) 45+1'; Wiles 78'; Taylor 84' (pen.); Sørensen (yellow card) 90'	Report	Broadbent (yellow card) 50'; Sharp (yellow card) 60'; O'Riordan (yellow card) 83'	Stadium: Kirklees Stadium; Attendance: 18,529; Referee: Leigh Doughty

23 August 2025 5	Port Vale	0–1	Doncaster Rovers	Burslem
15:00 BST	Humphreys (yellow card) 37'	Report	McGrath (yellow card) 50'; Bailey 54'; Molyneux (yellow card) 90+2'	Stadium: Vale Park; Attendance: 7,728; Referee: Ruebyn Ricardo

30 August 2025 6	Doncaster Rovers	1–0	Rotherham United	Doncaster
12:30 BST	Bailey 26'; Broadbent (yellow card) 73'; Ajayi (yellow card) 85'; Senior (yellow card) 87'	Report	Etete (yellow card) 12'	Stadium: Eco-Power Stadium; Attendance: 11,457; Referee: Elliot Bell
Note: Fixture was originally scheduled for a 15:00 kick-off, but was moved live Sky Sports broadcasting.

6 September 2025 7	Doncaster Rovers	3–1	Bradford City	Doncaster
3:00 BST	Molyneux 6'; Gibson 22'; Sharp 44'		Swan 12'; Tilt (yellow card) 44'; Wright (yellow card) 53'	Stadium: Eco-Power Stadium; Attendance: 11,191; Referee: Alex Chilowicz

13 September 2025 8	Wigan Athletic	3–0	Doncaster Rovers	Wigan
15:00 BST	Costelloe 11'; Smith 14'; Mullin (yellow card) 43'; Murray 50'; Fox (yellow card) 69'	Report	Senior (yellow card) 76'	Stadium: Brick Community Stadium; Attendance: 9,288; Referee: Craig Hicks

20 September 2025 9	Doncaster Rovers	1–2	AFC Wimbledon	Doncaster
15:00 BST	Molyneux (yellow card) 37'; Bailey 53'	Report	Seddon (yellow card) 37'; Johnson 70'; Smith (yellow card) 80'; Hippolyte 82'	Stadium: Eco-Power Stadium; Attendance: 7,889; Referee: Peter Wright

27 September 2025 10	Luton Town	1–0	Doncaster Rovers	Luton
15:00 BST	Naismith 40'; Wells (penalty missed) 43'; Keeley (yellow card) 45+5'; Kodua (yellow card) 77'	Report	Middleton (yellow card) 39'	Stadium: Kenilworth Road; Attendance: 10,957; Referee: Tim Robinson

4 October 2025 11	Doncaster Rovers	1–1	Burton Albion	Doncaster
12:30 BST	Pearson 31'; Sbarra (yellow card) 72'	Report	Hartridge (yellow card) 33'; Shade 69'	Stadium: Eco-Power Stadium; Attendance: 7,435; Referee: Thomas Parsons
Note: Fixture was originally scheduled for a 15:00 kick-off, but was rescheduled for live Sky Sports broadcasting.

11 October 2025 12	Leyton Orient	4–0	Doncaster Rovers	Leyton
15:00 BST	Ballard 2', 49', 72'; Connolly 20'; El Mizouni (yellow card) 90+6'	Report	McGrath (yellow card) 24'	Stadium: Brisbane Road; Attendance: 8,128; Referee: Edward Duckworth

18 October 2025 13	Doncaster Rovers	1–2	Northampton Town	Doncaster
15:00 BST	Close 36'; Middleton (yellow card) 55'	Report	Wheatley 47'; Hoskins 67' (pen.), (penalty missed) 86'; Fornah (yellow card) 81'	Stadium: Eco-Power Stadium; Attendance: 8,113; Referee: John Busby

25 October 2025 14	Reading	1–1	Doncaster Rovers	Reading
15:00 BST	Savage (yellow card) 44'; Doyle 68'	Report	Lo-Tutala (yellow card) 33'; Sharp 61'	Stadium: Madejski Stadium; Attendance: 12,003; Referee: Matthew Russell

8 November 2025 15	Doncaster Rovers	1–2	Barnsley	Doncaster
15:00 GMT	Molyneux 38'; Nixon (yellow card) 90+5'	Report	Yoganathan 33' (yellow card) 55'; Keillor-Dunn 68'; Roberts (yellow card) 75'; Connell (yellow card) 88'	Stadium: Eco-Power Stadium; Attendance: 11,415; Referee: Darren Drysdale

15 November 2025 16	Lincoln City	2–1	Doncaster Rovers	Lincoln
15:00 GMT	Okoronkwo 31'; Collins (yellow card) 44'; Gotts 71' (o.g.); Jefferies (yellow card) 84'	Report	Broadbent (yellow card) 36'; Maxwell (yellow card) 38'; Hanlan 70', (yellow card) 90+6'	Stadium: Sincil Bank; Attendance: 9,812; Referee: David Rock

22 November 2025 17	Stevenage	0–0	Doncaster Rovers	Stevenage
15:00 GMT	Piergianni (yellow card) 44'	Report	Middleton (yellow card) 86'; Molyneux (yellow card) 90+1'	Stadium: Broadhall Way; Attendance: 4,015; Referee: Elliot Bell

29 November 2025 18	Doncaster Rovers	2–1	Peterborough United	Doncaster
15:00 GMT	Gibson 7', 24'; Hanlan (yellow card) 32'; Clifton (yellow card) 33'; O'Riordan (yellow card) 65'; McGrath (yellow card) 69'; Maxwell (yellow card) 76'	Report	Kioso (yellow card) 34'; Leonard 50'; Woods (yellow card) 77'	Stadium: Eco-Power Stadium; Attendance: 9,654; Referee: Oliver Yates

9 December 2025 19	Doncaster Rovers	0–2	Stockport County	Doncaster
19:45 GMT	Sharp (yellow card) 38'; Broadbent (yellow card) 40'; Molyneux (yellow card) 55'; Bailey (yellow card) 90+6'	Report	Olowu (yellow card) 10'; Osborn 59', (yellow card) 83'; Wootton 66'	Stadium: Eco-Power Stadium; Attendance: 7,929; Referee: Martin Woods

13 December 2025 20	Cardiff City	4–3	Doncaster Rovers	Leckwith
15:00 GMT	Kellyman 25'; Ashford 34'; Salech 50'; Robertson (yellow card) 57'; Wintle (yellow card) 82'; Bagan 90+9'	Report	Bailey 15', (yellow card) 76'; Hanlan 42'; Close (yellow card) 59'; Clifton 72'	Stadium: Cardiff City Stadium; Referee: Alex Chilowicz

20 December 2025 21	Doncaster Rovers	1–5	Plymouth Argyle	Doncaster
15:00 GMT	Hanlan 4'; Bailey (yellow card) 62'; Lo-Tutala (yellow card) 72'	Report	Tolaj 11', 23', 73'; Oseni 22'; Ralls (yellow card) 62'; Mumba (yellow card) 63'; Amaechi 88'	Stadium: Eco-Power Stadium; Attendance: 8,370; Referee: Ross Joyce

26 December 2025 22	Blackpool	1–0	Doncaster Rovers	Blackpool
15:00 GMT	Bloxham 17'; Honeyman (yellow card) 36'; Horsfall (yellow card) 60'; Morgan (yellow card) 67'	Report	Broadbent (yellow card) 67'; Bailey (yellow card) 86'; Gotts (yellow card) 90+1'	Stadium: Bloomfield Road; Attendance: 16,616; Referee: Matthew Corlett

29 December 2025 23	Stockport County	4–2	Doncaster Rovers	Edgeley
19:45 GMT	Norwood 29' (pen.), (yellow card) 66'; Edun (yellow card) 38'; Wootton 60', 83'; Bailey (yellow card) 80'; Senior 90+8' (o.g.)	Report	Molyneux 25'; Senior (yellow card) 28'; Bailey 74'; Sharp (yellow card) 90+6'	Stadium: Edgeley Park; Attendance: 9,629

1 January 2026 24	Doncaster Rovers	1–1	Bolton Wanderers	Doncaster
15:00 GMT	Middleton 54'; Bailey (yellow card) 75'; Clifton (yellow card) 81'	Report	Osei-Tutu (yellow card) 36'; Simons (yellow card) 47'; Dempsey (yellow card) 70', (goal) 78'	Stadium: Eco-Power Stadium

17 January 2026 27	AFC Wimbledon	0–1	Doncaster Rovers	Wimbledon
15:00 GMT	Seddon (yellow card) 66'; Lewis (yellow card) 72' (yellow-red card) 90'; Reeves (yellow card) 85'	Report	Senior (yellow card) 56'; Gotts (yellow card) 73'; Bailey 90+9'	Stadium: Plough Lane; Attendance: 8,092; Referee: James Durkin

24 January 2026 28	Doncaster Rovers	3–3	Wigan Athletic	Doncaster
15:00 GMT	Okoronkwo 7'; McGrath 21'; Clifton 49'; Broadbent (yellow card) 58'; Gotts (yellow card) 79'; Senior (yellow card) 90+8'	Report	Carragher (yellow card) 45+1'; Taylor 60'; Wright 66'; Moxon 87'; Fox (yellow card) 89'	Stadium: Eco-Power Stadium; Attendance: 8,128; Referee: David Rock

27 January 2026 29	Doncaster Rovers	3–0	Leyton Orient	Doncaster
20:00 GMT	Bailey 34', 49'; Sterry (yellow card) 38'; Molyneux 45+1' (pen.); Sharp (yellow card) 79'	Report	Casey (yellow card) 45'; O'Neill (yellow card) 51'; Wellens (yellow card) 90+1'	Stadium: Eco-Power Stadium; Attendance: 7,033; Referee: Martin Woods
Note: Fixture was originally scheduled for a 19:45 kick-off, but was rescheduled for live Sky Sports broadcasting.

31 January 2026 30	Bradford City	1–0	Doncaster Rovers	Bradford
12:30 GMT	Baldwin (yellow card) 53'; Mullin (yellow card) 71'; Wright 81'	Report	Hanlan (yellow card) 80'	Stadium: Valley Parade; Attendance: 19,775; Referee: Craig Hicks
Note: Fixture was originally scheduled for a 15:00 kick-off, but was rescheduled for live Sky Sports broadcasting.

3 February 2026 26	Burton Albion	1–2	Doncaster Rovers	Burton upon Trent
19:45 GMT	Lofthouse 74'; Beesley (yellow card) 78'	Report	Molyneux 2' (pen.); Bailey 12'; Gotts (yellow card) 29'; Senior (yellow card) 45+1'	Stadium: Pirelli Stadium; Attendance: 3,069; Referee: Charles Breakspear
Note: Fixture was originally scheduled for 10 January, but it was postponed due to both clubs in FA Cup involvements.

7 February 2026 31	Wycombe Wanderers	4–0	Doncaster Rovers	High Wycombe
15:00 GMT	Morley 13'; Boyd-Munce (yellow card) 17'; Woodrow 47'; Onyedinma 59'; Mullins 72'	Report	McGrath (yellow card) 48'	Stadium: Adams Park; Attendance: 5,063; Referee: Kirsty Dowle

17 February 2026 33	Doncaster Rovers	1–0	Huddersfield Town	Doncaster
19:45 GMT	Byrne (yellow card) 28'; Molyneux 34' (pen.), (yellow card) 88'; Gotts (yellow card) 64'; Bailey (yellow card) 75'	Report	Nicholls (yellow card) 33'	Stadium: Eco-Power Stadium; Attendance: 9,118; Referee: Seb Stockbridge

21 February 2026 34	Rotherham United	1–2	Doncaster Rovers	Rotherham
12:30 GMT	Nombe 3' (pen.); McWilliams (yellow card) 10'; Spence (yellow card) 45'; Gray (yellow card) 90+6'	Report	McGrath (yellow card) 1'; Bynre (yellow card) 17'; Hanlan 56'; Molyneux 68'; Sterry (yellow card) 73'	Stadium: New York Stadium; Attendance: 10,049; Referee: Simon Mather
Note: Fixture was originally scheduled for a 15:00 kick-off, but was rescheduled on police advice.

28 February 2026 35	Doncaster Rovers	0–4	Cardiff City	Doncaster
15:00 GMT	Gotts (yellow card) 45+1'; Broadbent (yellow card) 77'	Report	Robertson 26'; Lawlor 46'; Ashford 56'; Robinson 90+5'	Stadium: Eco-Power Stadium; Attendance: 11,618; Referee: Edward Duckworth

7 March 2026 36	Plymouth Argyle	2–1	Doncaster Rovers	Plymouth
15:00 GMT	Edwards (yellow card) 21'; Pepple 45+3', (yellow card) 60'; Curtis (penalty missed) 51'; MacKenzie (yellow card) 58'; Watts (yellow card) 72'; Kane 74'; Ashby-Hammond (yellow card) 90+4'	Report	Lee 22'; Senior (yellow card) 35'; Clifton (yellow card) 42'; Molyneux (yellow card) 73'; Sterry (yellow card) 81'	Stadium: Home Park; Attendance: 16,046; Referee: Stephen Parkinson

10 March 2026 25	Doncaster Rovers	1–1	Luton Town	Doncaster
19:45 GMT	Hanlan 60'; Gotts (yellow card) 90+4'	Report	Palmer 27', (yellow card) 68'; Clark (yellow card) 41'; Walsh (yellow card) 72'	Stadium: Eco-Power Stadium; Attendance: 7,470; Referee: Andrew Humphries
Note: Fixture was originally scheduled for 4 January, but it was postponed due to a frozen pitch. It was then postponed again due to Luton's reinstatement into the EFL Trophy.

14 March 2026 37	Doncaster Rovers	2–1	Blackpool	Doncaster
15:00 GMT	Bailey 29'; Adelakun 83'	Report	Anderson (yellow card) 42'; Ennis (yellow card) 60'; Bowler (yellow card) 64'; Horsfall (yellow card) 74' (yellow-red card) 89'; Fletcher 88'	Stadium: Eco-Power Stadium; Attendance: 8,662; Referee: Carl Brook

17 March 2026 38	Bolton Wanderers	0–0	Doncaster Rovers	Horwich
19:45 GMT	Dempsey (yellow card) 58'; Toal (yellow card) 90+7'	Report	Gotts (yellow card) 45+1'; Pearson (yellow card) 54'; Sterry (yellow card) 90+6'; Byrne (yellow card) 90+8'	Stadium: Toughsheet Community Stadium; Attendance: 19,570; Referee: Jamie O'Connor

21 March 2026 39	Barnsley	0–1	Doncaster Rovers	Barnsley
15:00 GMT	O'Keeffe (yellow card) 64'; Watson (yellow card) 74'	Report	Gotts (yellow card) 54'; Lee 65' (pen.); Lo-Tutala (yellow card) 74'	Stadium: Oakwell; Attendance: 13,026; Referee: David Rock

24 March 2026 32	Doncaster Rovers	1–0	Port Vale	Doncaster
19:45 GMT	Campbell 22' (o.g.); Sterry (yellow card) 73'; Gotts (yellow card) 89'; Middleton (yellow card) 90+4'	Report		Stadium: Eco-Power Stadium; Attendance: 7,178; Referee: Michael Barlow
Note: Fixture was originally scheduled for 14 February, but was postponed due to Port Vale in FA Cup involvements.

3 April 2026 41	Doncaster Rovers	0–2	Mansfield Town	Doncaster
12:30 BST	Pearson (yellow card) 44'; McGrath (yellow card) 89'	Report	Oshilaja (yellow card) 26'; Oates 50'; Russell 70'	Stadium: Eco-Power Stadium; Attendance: 10,887; Referee: Lee Swabey
Note: Fixture was initially scheduled for a 15:00 kick-off, but was brought forward as an agreement was reached between the two clubs.

6 April 2026 42	Exeter City	3–0	Doncaster Rovers	Exeter
15:00 BST	Wareham (yellow card) 20', (goal) 42', 84'; Magennis 69'	Report		Stadium: St James Park; Attendance: 6,638; Referee: Alan Dale

11 April 2026 43	Doncaster Rovers	1–0	Reading	Doncaster
15:00 BST	Bailey 58'; Hanlan (yellow card) 90+6'	Report	Savage (yellow card) 37'; Kyerewaa (yellow card) 67'	Stadium: Eco-Power Stadium; Attendance: 8,904; Referee: Scott Jackson

18 April 2026 44	Northampton Town	1–3	Doncaster Rovers	Northampton
15:00 BST	Burroughs (yellow card) 45'; Campbell (yellow card) 59'; Guinness-Walker (yellow card) 69'; Evans (yellow card) 86'; List (yellow card) 90+1'; McGeehan 90+6'	Report	Lee 50'; Adelakun 57'; Lo-Tutala (yellow card) 69'; Broadbent 90+3'; Gotts (yellow card) 90+5'	Stadium: Sixfields Stadium; Attendance: 6,454; Referee: Dale Baines

21 April 2026 40	Doncaster Rovers	0–2	Lincoln City	Doncaster
19:45 BST	Gotts (yellow card) 16'; Senior (yellow card) 33'; Grehan (yellow card) 74'	Report	Lo-Tutala (yellow card) 22'; House 43', 72'	Stadium: Eco-Power Stadium; Attendance: 10,241; Referee: Seb Stockbridge
Note: Fixture was initially scheduled for 28 March, but was needed to be rearranged due to international call-ups.

25 April 2026 45	Doncaster Rovers	1–1	Stevenage	Doncaster
12:30 BST	McGrath (yellow card) 45+3'; Sharp 69'; Senior (yellow card) 72'	Report	Phillips 9'; Earley (yellow card) 60'	Stadium: Eco-Power Stadium; Attendance: 8,770; Referee: Martin Coy
Note: Fixture was initially scheduled for a 15:00 kick-off, but was brought forward for live Sky Sports broadcasting.

2 May 2026 46	Peterborough United	1–3	Doncaster Rovers	Peterborough
15:00 BST	Mills (yellow card) 38'; Leonard 76'	Report	Sharp 54', 73', 79'; Grehan (yellow card) 68'; Lee (yellow card) 87'	Stadium: London Road Stadium; Attendance: 10,192; Referee: Ed Duckworth

=== FA Cup ===
Doncaster were drawn away to Crewe Alexandra in the first round, to Chesterfield in the second round and at home to Southampton in the third round.

Win Draw Loss Fixtures

1 November 2025 First round	Crewe Alexandra	1–2	Doncaster Rovers	Crewe
15:00 GMT	Demetriou 45'	Report	Pearson (yellow card) 40'; Sharp 54'; Olusanya (yellow card) 86'; Bailey 90+2'	Stadium: Gresty Road; Attendance: 2,996; Referee: Neil Hair

6 December 2025 Second round	Chesterfield	1–2	Doncaster Rovers	Chesterfield
19:30 GMT	Bonis 31', (yellow card) 57'; Fleck (red card) 60'	Report	Clifton (yellow card) 6'; Maxwell (yellow card) 31'; Bailey 34'; Senior 90'	Stadium: SMH Group Stadium; Attendance: 6,175; Referee: Neil Hair

10 January 2026 Third round	Doncaster Rovers	2–3	Southampton	Doncaster
15:00 GMT	McGrath (yellow card) 36'; Pearson 48', (yellow card) 67'; Gibson 59'; Gotts (yellow card) 78'	Report	Bragg 8'; Archer 24'; Matsuki (yellow card) 36', (goal) 41'; Downes (yellow card) 84'	Stadium: Eco-Power Stadium; Attendance: 7,671; Referee: John Busby

=== EFL Cup ===
Doncaster were drawn away to Middlesbrough in the first round, Accrington Stanley in the second round and Tottenham Hotspur in the third round.

Win Draw Loss Fixtures

12 August 2025 First round	Middlesbrough	0–4	Doncaster Rovers	Middlesbrough
19:30 BST	Kanté (yellow card) 27'	Report	Close 11', (yellow card) 83'; Ajayi 23'; McGrath (yellow card) 47'; Grehan (yellow card) 60'; Gotts 84'; Nixon 90+6'	Stadium: Riverside Stadium; Attendance: 11,979; Referee: Matt Corlett

26 August 2025 Second round	Accrington Stanley	0–2	Doncaster Rovers	Accrington
19:45 BST	Woods (yellow card) 65' (yellow-red card) 71'	Report	Bailey 75'; Close 82'	Stadium: Crown Ground; Attendance: 1,270; Referee: Zac Kennard-Kettle

24 September 2025 Third round	Tottenham Hotspur	3–0	Doncaster Rovers	Tottenham
19:45 BST	João Palhinha 14'; McGrath 17' (o.g.); Porro (yellow card) 85'; Johnson 90+4'	Report	Bailey (yellow card) 19'	Stadium: Tottenham Hotspur Stadium; Attendance: 42,473; Referee: Andrew Madley

=== EFL Trophy ===
Doncaster were drawn against Bradford City, Grimsby Town and Everton U21 in the group stage. After winning the group they were guaranteed a home time in the round of 32, and were drawn against Chesterield, Then against Fleetwood Town in the round of 16, away to Huddersfield Town in the quarter-finals and home to Stockport County in the semi-finals.

Pos	Div	Team	Pld	W	PW	PL	L	GF	GA	GD	Pts	Qualification
1	L1	Doncaster Rovers	3	3	0	0	0	8	2	+6	9	Advance to Round 2
2	L1	Bradford City	3	2	0	0	1	8	5	+3	6	Advance to Round 2
3	L2	Grimsby Town	3	1	0	0	2	6	8	−2	3	
4	ACA	Everton U21	3	0	0	0	3	5	12	−7	0	

Source: EFL

Win Draw Loss Fixtures

2 September 2025 North Group C	Doncaster Rovers	2–1	Everton U21	Doncaster
19:00 BST	Hanlan 7'; Close (yellow card) 54'; McGrath (yellow card) 65'; Sbarra 90+4'	Report	Beaumont-Clark (yellow card) 51'; Clarke 90+2'	Stadium: Eco-Power Stadium; Attendance: 1,755; Referee: Jamie O'Connor

7 October 2025 North Group C	Grimsby Town	0–3	Doncaster Rovers	Cleethorpes
19:00 BST		Report	Gotts 7', 14'; McJannet 90' (o.g.); Flint (yellow card) 90+3'	Stadium: Blundell Park; Attendance: 1,511; Referee: Scott Oldham

11 November 2025 North Group C	Doncaster Rovers	3–1	Bradford City	Doncaster
19:00 GMT	Gotts (yellow card) 16'; Gibson 64', 78'; Hanlan 70'	Report	Wright 39'; Halliday (yellow card) 84'	Stadium: Eco-Power Stadium; Attendance: 2,085; Referee: Steven Copeland

2 December 2025 Round of 32	Doncaster Rovers	5–1	Chesterfield	Doncaster
19:00 GMT	Sharp 15', 77', 90+1'; Ajayi 19'; Senior 31'	Report	Grimes (yellow card) 54'; Bonis 74'	Stadium: Eco-Power Stadium; Referee: James Oldham

13 January 2026 Round of 16	Doncaster Rovers	3–1	Fleetwood Town	Doncaster
19:00 GMT	Sharp 25', 52'; Adelakun 84'; Molyneux (yellow card) 90+4'	Report	Davies 90', (yellow card) 90+5'; Bonds (yellow card) 90+3'	Stadium: Eco-Power Stadium; Attendance: 1,506; Referee: Richard Eley

10 February 2026 Quarter-finals	Huddersfield Town	0–0 (0–2 p)	Doncaster Rovers	Huddersfield
19:00 GMT	Ashia 52'; Kasumu (yellow card) 73'	Report	Pearson (yellow card) 18'; Sharp 35' (pen.); Maxwell (yellow card) 90'	Stadium: Kirklees Stadium; Referee: Tom Reeves
	Penalties
	May (penalty missed); Sørensen (penalty missed); Charles (penalty missed); Evans (penalty missed)		Molyneux (penalty missed); Close (penalty scored); Gotts (penalty scored)

3 March 2026 Semi-finals	Doncaster Rovers	0–1	Stockport County	Doncaster
20:00 GMT	Pearson (yellow card) 79'; Molyneux (yellow card) 90'	Report	Norwood 11'; Dixon (yellow card) 53'	Stadium: Eco-Power Stadium; Attendance: 5,418; Referee: Will Finnie

== Statistics ==
=== Appearances and goals ===
Players with no appearances are not included on the list; italics indicated loaned in player

No.	Pos	Nat	Player	Total		League One		FA Cup		EFL Cup		EFL Trophy	
No.	Pos	Nat	Player	Apps	Goals	Apps	Goals	Apps	Goals	Apps	Goals	Apps	Goals
1	GK	(Scotland) SCO	Zander Clark	9	0	7+0	0	0+0	0	0+0	0	2+0	0
2	DF	(England) ENG	Jamie Sterry	36	0	28+4	0	2+0	0	0+0	0	2+0	0
3	DF	(Scotland) SCO	James Maxwell	26	0	18+1	0	2+1	0	1+0	0	3+0	0
4	MF	(England) ENG	Owen Bailey	55	16	46+0	13	3+0	2	1+2	1	0+3	0
5	DF	(England) ENG	Matty Pearson	37	2	26+5	1	2+0	1	1+0	0	3+0	0
6	DF	(Republic of Ireland) IRL	Jay McGrath	42	1	27+5	1	2+1	0	2+0	0	5+0	0
7	FW	(England) ENG	Luke Molyneux	52	8	39+1	8	3+0	0	0+3	0	0+6	0
8	MF	(England) ENG	George Broadbent	46	1	24+15	1	2+0	0	0+0	0	4+1	0
9	FW	(England) ENG	Brandon Hanlan	46	7	20+16	5	1+1	0	1+1	0	3+3	2
10	MF	(England) ENG	Joe Sbarra	8	1	3+0	0	0+0	0	3+0	0	2+0	1
11	MF	(England) ENG	Jordan Gibson	51	6	18+22	3	2+1	1	2+1	0	2+3	2
12	DF	(Republic of Ireland) IRL	Neill Byrne	14	0	14+0	0	0+0	0	0+0	0	0+0	0
14	FW	(England) ENG	Billy Sharp	45	14	19+18	7	1+2	1	1+0	0	4+0	6
15	MF	(Wales) WAL	Harry Clifton	42	2	27+10	2	2+0	0	0+1	0	2+0	0
16	DF	(England) ENG	Tom Nixon	23	1	9+5	0	0+0	0	3+0	1	5+1	0
17	FW	(Scotland) SCO	Glenn Middleton	46	1	15+20	1	1+1	0	1+2	0	6+0	0
18	MF	(England) ENG	Elliot Lee	18	3	14+4	3	0+0	0	0+0	0	0+0	0
20	MF	(Northern Ireland) NIR	Darren Robinson	10	0	2+4	0	0+1	0	0+0	0	3+0	0
22	MF	(England) ENG	Robbie Gotts	44	3	25+11	0	1+1	0	1+1	1	3+1	2
23	DF	(England) ENG	Jack Senior	46	2	28+9	0	1+1	1	2+0	0	4+1	1
25	DF	(Northern Ireland) NIR	Bayley McCann	2	0	0+2	0	0+0	0	0+0	0	0+0	0
27	DF	(Republic of Ireland) IRL	Seán Grehan	24	0	11+6	0	1+0	0	3+0	0	3+0	0
29	GK	(France) FRA	Thimothée Lo-Tutala	39	0	33+0	0	3+0	0	0+0	0	3+0	0
31	MF	(England) ENG	Will Flint	2	0	0+0	0	0+0	0	0+0	0	2+0	0
32	GK	(England) ENG	Jake Oram	1	0	0+1	0	0+0	0	0+0	0	0+0	0
33	MF	(England) ENG	Ben Close	31	3	9+12	1	0+1	0	3+0	2	5+1	0
34	MF	(England) ENG	Harry Glaves	1	0	0+0	0	0+0	0	0+0	0	0+1	0
37	MF	(England) ENG	Sam Straughan-Brown	3	0	0+0	0	0+0	0	0+0	0	1+2	0
38	FW	(England) ENG	Ethan Hodgett	2	0	0+0	0	0+0	0	0+0	0	0+2	0
39	MF	(England) ENG	Deshaun Musgrave-Dore	1	0	0+0	0	0+0	0	0+0	0	0+1	0
40	DF	(England) ENG	Kasper Williams	1	0	0+1	0	0+0	0	0+0	0	0+0	0
41	GK	(England) ENG	Jacob Bryant	1	0	0+0	0	0+0	0	0+0	0	0+1	0
42	FW	(England) ENG	Rhomani Murray	1	0	0+0	0	0+0	0	0+0	0	0+1	0
47	FW	(England) ENG	Hakeeb Adelakun	23	3	14+5	2	1+0	0	0+0	0	0+3	1
Player(s) who featured but departed the club during the season:
1	GK	(Republic of Ireland) IRL	Ian Lawlor	11	0	6+0	0	0+0	0	3+0	0	2+0	0
12	DF	(Republic of Ireland) IRL	Connor O'Riordan	23	0	18+1	0	2+0	0	0+1	0	1+0	0
18	MF	(Wales) WAL	Charlie Crew	11	0	5+2	0	0+1	0	1+1	0	1+0	0
19	FW	(England) ENG	Damola Ajayi	19	2	1+10	0	0+1	0	3+0	1	4+0	1
19	FW	(England) ENG	Francis Okoronkwo	5	1	3+0	1	1+0	0	0+0	0	0+1	0
20	FW	(England) ENG	Joe Ironside	2	0	0+0	0	0+0	0	0+2	0	0+0	0
30	FW	(England) ENG	Toyosi Olusanya	11	0	0+7	0	0+1	0	1+0	0	2+0	0
