= Owen Bailey =

English footballer (born 1999)

Personal information
- Full name: Owen John Edward Bailey
- Date of birth: 22 January 1999 (age 27)
- Place of birth: Newcastle upon Tyne, England
- Height: 5 ft 11 in (1.80 m)
- Position: Midfielder

Team information
- Current team: Doncaster Rovers
- Number: 4

Youth career
- –2021: Newcastle United

Senior career*
Years	Team	Apps	(Gls)
2021–2023	Gateshead	74	(9)
2023–	Doncaster Rovers	152	(23)
- * Club domestic league appearances and goals as of 13:20, 22 November 2026 (UTC)

Owen John Edward Bailey (born 22 January 1999) is an English professional footballer who plays as a midfielder for EFL League One club Doncaster Rovers.

== Career ==
Born in Newcastle upon Tyne, Bailey began his career at Newcastle United, captaining the under-23 team. Bailey suffered from injuries which saw him out-of-action for 538 days. After being released by Newcastle, he played in non-league with Gateshead, before signing for Doncaster Rovers in June 2023, having trialled with the club in 2021.

On 13 May 2023, Bailey signed for Doncaster Rovers on a two-year contract.

Bailey was a regular starter throughout the 2023–24 League Two season, making 59 first‑team appearances and featuring in all league matches as Doncaster finished 5th in the League Two table.

Bailey scored his first English Football League goal for Doncaster in a 1–0 victory against Wrexham on 2 April 2024, heading home from a James Maxwell cross just before half-time.

Ahead of the 2025–26 season, Bailey was named club captain having led the club through the majority of the title-winning 2024–25 season.

On 9 August 2025, he scored both goals in a 2–1 away win against Mansfield Town, equalising in the 76th minute and then scoring the stoppage-time winner.

Bailey was named the EFL League One Player of the Month for August 2025 following a series of strong performances at the start of the 2025–26 season. The Doncaster Rovers captain scored four goals during the month and played a key role as the club made a positive return to League One following promotion. He was selected ahead of fellow nominees Jamie Reid, Matty Stevens and Nathan Trott . Upon receiving the award, Bailey credited his teammates and coaching staff, stating that individual recognition was a reflection of the collective effort of the squad.

In April 2026, Bailey was nominated for League One player of the season, alongside Sonny Bradley, Dom Ballard and Jack Moylan, after an incredible personal season, having scored 15 goals from midfield and defensive roles at the time.

On 22 August 2026, Bailey made his 140th consecutive league start, breaking a club record that had stood for 75 years.

== Career statistics ==
As of match played 21 November 2026

Appearances and goals by club, season and competition
Club	Season	League			FA Cup		EFL Cup		Other		Total	
Club	Season	Division	Apps	Goals	Apps	Goals	Apps	Goals	Apps	Goals	Apps	Goals
Newcastle United U21	2017–18	—			—		—		1 (Note: Appearance(s) in EFL Trophy)	0	1	0
Newcastle United U21	2018–19	—			—		—		5	0	5	0
Newcastle United U21	2019–20	—			—		—		1	0	1	0
Newcastle United U21	Total		—		—		—		7	0	7	0
Gateshead	2021–22	National League North	42	4	5	0	—		0	0	47	4
Gateshead	2022–23	National League	32	5	3	0	—		4 (Note: Appearance(s) in FA Trophy)	2	39	7
Gateshead	Total		74	9	8	0	0	0	4	2	86	11
Doncaster Rovers	2023–24	League Two	46	2	3	0	2	0	8 (Note: Six appearances, one goal in EFL Trophy, Two appearances in English Football League play-offs)	1	59	3
Doncaster Rovers	2024–25	League Two	46	5	4	0	2	0	2	0	54	5
Doncaster Rovers	2025–26	League One	46	13	3	2	3	1	3	0	55	16
Doncaster Rovers	2026–27	League One	14	3	1	0	2	0	2	1	19	4
Doncaster Rovers	Total		152	23	11	2	9	1	15	2	187	28
Career total			226	32	19	2	9	1	26	4	279	39

== Honours ==
Doncaster Rovers

- EFL League Two: 2024–25

Individual

- EFL League One Player of the Month: August 2025
- EFL League One Team of the Season: 2025–26
