= Jack Senior (footballer) =

English footballer (born 1997)

Personal information
- Full name: Jack Christopher Senior
- Date of birth: 13 January 1997 (age 29)
- Place of birth: Halifax, England
- Height: 5 ft 9 in (1.74 m)
- Position: Left-back

Team information
- Current team: Doncaster Rovers
- Number: 23

Youth career
- –2007: Elland Juniors
- 2007–2016: Huddersfield Town

Senior career*
| Years | Team | Apps | (Gls) |
| 2016–2019 | Luton Town | 10 | (0) |
| 2019 | → Harrogate Town (loan) | 4 | (0) |
| 2019–2020 | Gloucester City | 8 | (1) |
| 2020–2023 | FC Halifax Town | 100 | (0) |
| 2023– | Doncaster Rovers | 91 | (2) |
- * Club domestic league appearances and goals as of 21:14, 16 August 2026 (UTC)

Jack Christopher Senior (born 13 January 1997) is an English professional footballer who plays as a left-back for EFL League One club Doncaster Rovers.

== Career ==
=== Huddersfield Town ===
Senior was born in Halifax, West Yorkshire, and began his youth career with Elland Juniors before joining the Huddersfield Town academy at the age of ten. He commenced a two-year scholarship ahead of the 2013–14 season and subsequently signed his first professional contract with the club for the 2015–16 campaign. During that season, Senior took part in the first-team pre-season programme but primarily featured for the development squad, which won the Northern Division by an eight‑point margin. He made 36 appearances and scored two goals at that level. At the conclusion of the campaign, Huddersfield exercised the option to extend his contract for a further year.

=== Luton Town ===
Senior joined League Two club Luton Town on a two-year contract on 31 August 2016. Upon his arrival, manager Nathan Jones described him as "a young, hungry and athletic player who wants to learn." Shortly after signing, Senior sustained an injury in training, but he made his Luton debut on 4 October 2016, starting in a 2–0 home victory over West Bromwich Albion U21 in the EFL Trophy. He made his English Football League debut on 14 January 2017, appearing as a 56th-minute substitute for Jordan Cook in a 2–1 win away to Crewe Alexandra. Senior subsequently established himself in the team with a run of ten consecutive starts, a sequence that ended when he was rested for the league match against Yeovil Town on 4 March. He returned to the starting line‑up for a 1–1 draw with Exeter City two weeks later but then missed four matches due to a foot injury. In April 2017, Senior was named in the EFL Trophy Team of the Tournament. Although fit for selection thereafter, he made no further appearances and concluded the 2016–17 season with 16 appearances in all competitions.

On 14 November 2017, Senior signed a one-year contract extension with Luton, which included an option for a further year. He joined National League club Harrogate Town on 31 January 2019 on loan for the remainder of the 2018–19 season and was released by Luton at the end of the campaign following the expiry of his contract.

=== Gloucester City ===
After leaving Luton, Senior spent time on trial with Grimsby Town in July 2019 but was not offered a contract. He subsequently signed for National League North club Gloucester City on 26 November 2019 and scored on his debut four days later in a 2–2 home draw with Kettering Town.

=== FC Halifax Town ===
Senior signed for National League club FC Halifax Town on 21 August 2020.

=== Doncaster Rovers ===
Senior signed for League Two club Doncaster Rovers on 8 June 2023 after agreeing a two-year contract. In March 2025, with his contract due to expire at the end of the season, Doncaster exercised an option to extend it by a further year. After scoring his first goal for the club on his 74th appearance in a 5–1 victory over Chesterfield in the EFL Trophy on 2 December 2025, he netted again against the same opposition four days later, scoring a 90th-minute winner in a 2–1 FA Cup second-round tie that sent Doncaster into the third round. Following the end of the 2025–26 League One season, in which Doncaster finished 14th and Senior made 37 appearances, he signed a new two-year contract with the club on 8 May 2026.

On 15 August, Senior scored his first league goal for Doncaster against Mansfield Town

== Career statistics ==
As of end of 2025–26 season

Appearances and goals by club, season and competition
| Club | Season | League | | | FA Cup | | EFL Cup | | Other | | Total | |
| Club | Season | Division | Apps | Goals | Apps | Goals | Apps | Goals | Apps | Goals | Apps | Goals |
|---|---|---|---|---|---|---|---|---|---|---|---|---|
| Luton Town | 2016–17 | League Two | 10 | 0 | 0 | 0 | 0 | 0 | 6 (Note: Appearances in EFL Trophy) | 0 | 16 | 0 |
| Luton Town | 2017–18 | League Two | 0 | 0 | 0 | 0 | 0 | 0 | 5 | 0 | 5 | 0 |
| Luton Town | 2018–19 | League One | 0 | 0 | 0 | 0 | 0 | 0 | 3 | 0 | 3 | 0 |
| Luton Town | Total | | 10 | 0 | 0 | 0 | 0 | 0 | 14 | 0 | 24 | 0 |
| Harrogate Town (loan) | 2018–19 | National League | 4 | 0 | — | | — | | 2 (Note: One appearance in FA Trophy, one in National League play-offs) | 0 | 6 | 0 |
| Gloucester City | 2019–20 | National League North | 8 | 1 | — | | — | | — | | 8 | 1 |
| FC Halifax Town | 2020–21 | National League | 31 | 0 | 1 | 0 | — | | 2 (Note: Appearances in FA Trophy) | 0 | 34 | 0 |
| FC Halifax Town | 2021–22 | National League | 33 | 0 | 4 | 0 | — | | 4 (Note: Three appearances in FA Trophy, one in National League play-offs) | 0 | 41 | 0 |
| FC Halifax Town | 2022–23 | National League | 36 | 0 | 2 | 0 | — | | 5 | 0 | 43 | 0 |
| FC Halifax Town | Total | | 100 | 0 | 7 | 0 | — | | 11 | 0 | 118 | 0 |
| Doncaster Rovers | 2023–24 | League Two | 23 | 0 | 2 | 0 | 1 | 0 | 2 | 0 | 28 | 0 |
| Doncaster Rovers | 2024–25 | League Two | 21 | 0 | 3 | 0 | 2 | 0 | 3 | 0 | 29 | 0 |
| Doncaster Rovers | 2025–26 | League One | 37 | 0 | 2 | 1 | 2 | 0 | 5 | 1 | 46 | 2 |
| Doncaster Rovers | 2026–27 | League One | 10 | 2 | 0 | 0 | 2 | 0 | 1 | 0 | | |
| Doncaster Rovers | Total | | 81 | 0 | 7 | 1 | 5 | 0 | 10 | 1 | 103 | 2 |
| Career total | | | 203 | 1 | 14 | 1 | 5 | 0 | 37 | 1 | 259 | 3 |

== Honours ==
FC Halifax Town

- FA Trophy: 2022–23

Doncaster Rovers

- EFL League Two: 2024–25

Individual

- EFL Trophy Team of the Tournament: 2016–17
