= Darren Robinson (footballer) =

Northern Irish footballer

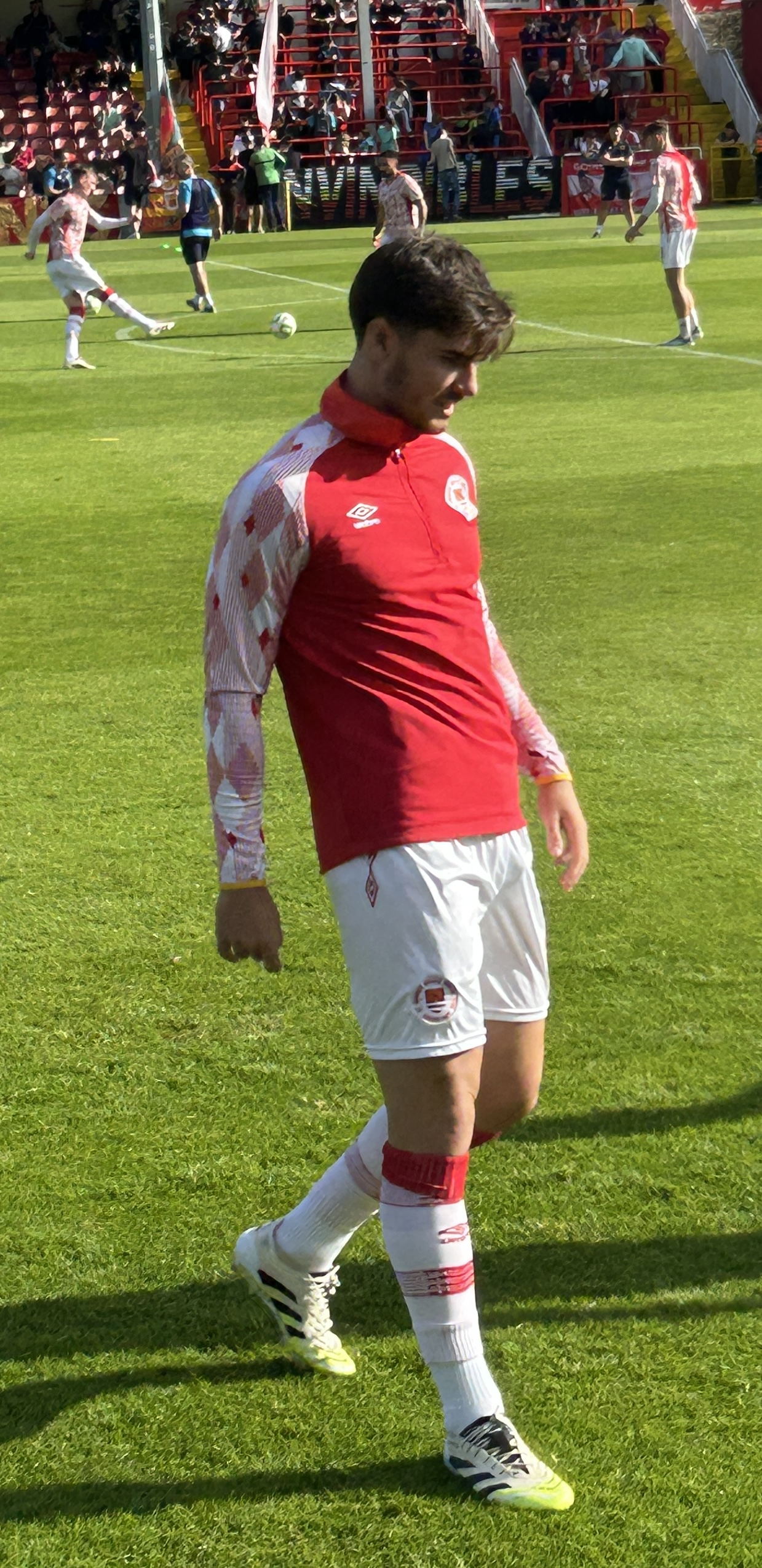
- Robinson during a pre-match warmup with St Patrick's Athletic in 2025.

Personal information
- Full name: Darren Robert Russell Robinson
- Date of birth: 29 December 2004 (age 21)
- Place of birth: Portadown, Northern Ireland
- Height: 6 ft 2 in (1.87 m)
- Position: Midfielder

Team information
- Current team: Doncaster Rovers
- Number: 20

Youth career
- –2019: Portadown
- 2019–2021: Dungannon Swifts
- 2021–2023: Derby County

Senior career*
Years	Team	Apps	(Gls)
2021	Dungannon Swifts	1	(0)
2021–2026	Derby County	1	(0)
2024	→ Hartlepool United (loan)	6	(0)
2025	→ St Patrick's Athletic (loan)	8	(0)
2026–	Doncaster Rovers	8	(0)

International career^{‡}
2022	Northern Ireland U18	3	(0)
2022–2023	Northern Ireland U19	6	(0)
2023–	Northern Ireland U21	12	(0)
- * Club domestic league appearances and goals as of 16:06, 22 October 2026 (UTC) ‡ National team caps and goals as of 17:31, 16 October 2025 (UTC)

Darren Robert Russell Robinson (born 29 December 2004) is a Northern Irish professional footballer who plays as a midfielder for EFL League One club Doncaster Rovers.

Robinson spent his youth career in his native Northern Ireland at Portadown, before joining Dungannon Swifts in 2019, where he made his first team debut in 2021. In May 2021, Robinson moved to England and signed with Derby County, making his debut for the first team in April 2022. Robinson had a loan spell at Hartlepool United from August to October 2024 and another at St Patrick's Athletic from July to November 2025.

== Club career ==
=== Early career ===
Portadown, County Armagh born Robinson came through the academy at local club Portadown before departing in 2019 for Dungannon Swifts.

=== Dungannon Swifts ===
Robinson signed his first professional contract with Dungannon Swifts in January 2021. During the 2020–21 season, he spent time training at English clubs Fleetwood Town, Stoke City and Derby County. He made his first-team debut for Dungannon Swifts, aged 15, on 29 May 2021 as a late substitute against Glenavon.

=== Derby County ===
On 31 May 2021, Robinson signed for EFL Championship club Derby County on a three-year professional contract. After Derby County went into administration in November 2021, it was reported that Dungammon Swifts were owed £36,000 for the transfer of Robinson. On 15 January 2022, he was named on Derby's first-team bench for their 2–0 win over Sheffield United, having impressed for both the under-18 and under-23 teams. He made his debut for Derby on 23 April 2022 as a 82nd-minute substitute in a 3–1 defeat to Bristol City. During the 2022–23 season, Robinson was a regular in the under-21 team and made two first team appearances, both in the EFL Trophy. He signed his professional contract for the club, until June 2024 and was named club scholar of the year for a second year in a row in May 2023. In the lead up the 2023–24 season, Robinson was promoted to the first team squad, taking a full part in all first team pre-season activities. Robinson featured in 10 League One matchday squads as an unused substitute during the season which ended in promotion back to the Championship for the first team, Robinson would play one first team match for Derby, in an EFL Trophy match against Wolverhampton Wanderers U-21s on 8 November 2023; playing 90 minutes as a central defender. Robinson when not part of first team squads played for the under-21s, where he took on the role of captain. On 18 May 2024, it was announced that Robinson had signed a two-year contract extension, keeping him at Derby until June 2026.

==== Hartlepool United loan ====
In August 2024, he joined National League side Hartlepool United on loan until 1 January 2025. Robinson struggled to make an impact at Hartlepool and on 25 October 2024, was recalled from his loan by Derby after making six appearances, with only two starts.

==== St Patrick's Athletic loan ====
On 28 July 2025, Robinson signed for League of Ireland Premier Division club St Patrick's Athletic on loan until the end of their season in November. He made his debut for the club on 3 August 2025, replacing Brandon Kavanagh from the bench in injury time of a 2–0 win over Waterford at the RSC. On 14 August 2025, he made his first start for the club, in a 3–2 defeat away to Turkish giants Beşiktaş in the UEFA Conference League. He made a total of 11 appearances in all competitions during his loan spell, before returning to his parent club.

=== Doncaster Rovers ===
On 2 January 2026, Robinson joined League One club Doncaster Rovers on a free transfer, signing a two-and-a-half year deal. He made his debut for the club as an 84th-minute substitute in a 3–2 loss at home to Southampton in the FA Cup.

== International career ==
Robinson was called up to the Northern Ireland under-19 team in March 2022. He made 3 appearances during the March 2022 international break.

== Career statistics ==
As of match played 20 October 2026

Appearances and goals by club, season and competition
Club	Season	League			National Cup (Note: Includes the Irish Cup, FA Cup & FAI Cup)		League Cup (Note: Includes the Northern Ireland Football League Cup & EFL Cup)		Europe		Other		Total	
Club	Season	Division	Apps	Goals	Apps	Goals	Apps	Goals	Apps	Goals	Apps	Goals	Apps	Goals
Dungannon Swifts	2020–21	NIFL Premiership	1	0	0	0	0	0	–		–		1	0
Derby County	2021–22	Championship	1	0	0	0	0	0	–		–		1	0
Derby County	2022–23	League One	0	0	0	0	0	0	–		2 (Note: Appearance(s) in the EFL Trophy)	0	2	0
Derby County	2023–24	League One	0	0	0	0	0	0	–		1	0	1	0
Derby County	2024–25	Championship	0	0	0	0	0	0	–		–		0	0
Derby County	2025–26	Championship	0	0	0	0	–		–		–		0	0
Derby County	Total		1	0	0	0	0	0	–		3	0	4	0
Hartlepool United (loan)	2024–25	National League	6	0	0	0	–		–		–		6	0
St Patrick's Athletic (loan)	2025	League of Ireland Premier Division	8	0	1	0	–		1 (Note: Appearance(s) in the UEFA Conference League)	0	1 (Note: Appearance in the Leinster Senior Cup)	0	11	0
Doncaster Rovers	2025–26	League One	6	0	1	0	–		–		3	0	10	0
Doncaster Rovers	2026–27	League One	2	0	0	0	1	0	–		1	0	4	0
Doncaster Rovers	Total		8	0	1	0	1	0	–		4	0	14	0
Career total			24	0	2	0	1	0	1	0	8	0	36	0
