= Jay McGrath =

Irish footballer (born 2003)

Personal information
- Full name: John-Alan McGrath
- Date of birth: 15 April 2003 (age 23)
- Place of birth: Doncaster, England
- Height: 1.85 m (6 ft 1 in)
- Position: Defender

Team information
- Current team: Doncaster Rovers
- Number: 6

Youth career
- –2019: Doncaster Rovers

Senior career*
| Years | Team | Apps | (Gls) |
| 2019–2020 | Mickleover | 7 | (0) |
| 2020–2023 | Coventry City | 0 | (0) |
| 2022 | → Alfreton Town (loan) | 0 | (0) |
| 2023 | → St Patrick's Athletic (loan) | 20 | (1) |
| 2023 | St Patrick's Athletic | 7 | (0) |
| 2024– | Doncaster Rovers | 75 | (1) |
- * Club domestic league appearances and goals as of 15:55, 8 October 2026 (UTC)

John-Alan "Jay" McGrath (born 15 April 2003) is an Irish professional footballer who plays as a defender for EFL League One club Doncaster Rovers. Mainly a centre-back, he can also be deployed as a left-back.

== Career ==
=== Youth career ===
McGrath was born and raised in Doncaster and came through the academy of his local club Doncaster Rovers before being released at the age of 16.

=== Mickleover ===
McGrath started his senior career with Mickleover where he made 7 first team appearances during the 2019–20 Northern Premier League season. In August 2019, he made history when he (aged 16) and his father John McGrath (aged 39) became the first ever father and son to feature together in an FA Cup tie, when they featured in a 3–0 win over Coventry Sphinx.

=== Coventry City ===
After his breakthrough season, he signed for Coventry City on a two-year contract in the summer of 2020. He captained the club's Under 23 side during his time with the Sky Blues. In November 2022, he joined Alfreton Town on a month-long loan deal. His only appearance for Alfreton Town, came in a 4–1 defeat away to Darlington in the FA Trophy. During his time with the club, he trained regularly with the first team, marking future Arsenal striker Viktor Gyökeres among others in training games. On 14 February 2023 he was loaned out to St Patrick's Athletic until the end of his contract. He was released by the club on 30 June 2023, upon the expiry of his contract.

=== St Patrick's Athletic ===
On 14 February 2023, he signed for League of Ireland Premier Division club St Patrick's Athletic on loan until 30 June 2023. He scored the first senior goal of his career on 5 June 2023, finding the bottom corner from 25 yards out in a 4–1 win over Derry City at Richmond Park. On 1 July 2023, McGrath signed a permanent contract with the club upon the expiry of his loan deal and Coventry City contract. On 20 July 2023, McGrath made his first appearance in European competition in a 3–2 loss at home to F91 Dudelange in the first qualifying round of the UEFA Europa Conference League. On 12 November 2023, McGrath was part of the squad for the 2023 FAI Cup Final, as his side produced a 3–1 win over Bohemians in front of a record breaking FAI Cup Final crowd of 43,881 at the Aviva Stadium.

=== Doncaster Rovers ===
On 4 January 2024, McGrath signed a two-and-a-half-year contract with League Two side Doncaster Rovers, his local club whom his father John also played for between 2003 and 2005. McGrath featured heavily during the club's 2024–25 EFL League Two win which earned them promotion to EFL League One. On 10 July 2025, he signed a new 3-year contract with the Doncaster, who revealed that they had turned down a bid of £500,000 from a fellow League One side for McGrath. On 24 January 2026, he scored his first goal for the club in a 3–3 draw at home to Wigan Athletic.

== Personal life ==
He is the son of former professional footballer John McGrath.

McGrath, like his father, has a degree in Professional Sports Writing and Broadcasting from the University of Staffordshire, which he obtained in 2024.

== International career ==
Born in England, McGrath is eligible to play for the Ireland through his Limerick-born father John, who is a former Republic of Ireland U21 international. In 2021, he was called up to the Republic of Ireland U19 side for a training camp. On 25 March 2023, McGrath received his first call-up to the Republic of Ireland U21 team for a friendly against Iceland U21 at Turners Cross.

== Career statistics ==
As of match played on 6 October 2026

Appearances and goals by club, season and competition
| Club | Season | League | | | National Cup (Note: Includes FA Cup & FAI Cup) | | League Cup (Note: Includes EFL Cup) | | Other | | Total | |
| Club | Season | Division | Apps | Goals | Apps | Goals | Apps | Goals | Apps | Goals | Apps | Goals |
|---|---|---|---|---|---|---|---|---|---|---|---|---|
| Mickleover Sports | 2019–20 | Northern Premier League | 7 | 0 | 1 | 0 | — | | — | | 8 | 0 |
| Coventry City | 2020–21 | Championship | 0 | 0 | 0 | 0 | 0 | 0 | — | | 0 | 0 |
| Coventry City | 2021–22 | Championship | 0 | 0 | 0 | 0 | 0 | 0 | — | | 0 | 0 |
| Coventry City | 2022–23 | Championship | 0 | 0 | 0 | 0 | 0 | 0 | — | | 0 | 0 |
| Coventry City | Total | | 0 | 0 | 0 | 0 | 0 | 0 | 0 | 0 | 0 | 0 |
| Alfreton Town (loan) | 2022–23 | National League North | 0 | 0 | — | | — | | 1 (Note: Appearance(s) in FA Trophy) | 0 | 1 | 0 |
| St Patrick's Athletic (loan) | 2023 | LOI Premier Division | 20 | 1 | – | | – | | – | | 20 | 1 |
| St Patrick's Athletic | 2023 | LOI Premier Division | 7 | 0 | 4 | 0 | – | | 1 (Note: Appearance(s) in UEFA Europa Conference League) | 0 | 12 | 0 |
| Doncaster Rovers | 2023–24 | League Two | 5 | 0 | – | | – | | 2 (Note: Appearance(s) in EFL Trophy) | 0 | 7 | 0 |
| Doncaster Rovers | 2024–25 | League Two | 33 | 0 | 2 | 0 | 2 | 0 | 3 | 0 | 40 | 0 |
| Doncaster Rovers | 2025–26 | League One | 32 | 1 | 3 | 0 | 2 | 0 | 5 | 0 | 42 | 1 |
| Doncaster Rovers | 2026–27 | League One | 5 | 0 | 0 | 0 | 2 | 0 | 1 | 0 | 8 | 0 |
| Doncaster Rovers | Total | | 75 | 1 | 5 | 0 | 6 | 0 | 11 | 0 | 97 | 1 |
| Total | | | 109 | 2 | 10 | 0 | 6 | 0 | 13 | 0 | 138 | 2 |

== Honours ==
St Patrick's Athletic

- FAI Cup: 2023

Doncaster Rovers

- EFL League Two: 2024–25
