= Robbie Gotts =

English footballer (born 1999)

Personal information
- Full name: Robbie Gotts
- Date of birth: 9 November 1999 (age 27)
- Place of birth: Harrogate, England
- Height: 1.77 m (5 ft 10 in)
- Positions: Midfielder; right-back

Team information
- Current team: Doncaster Rovers
- Number: 22

Youth career
- –2019: Leeds United

Senior career*
Years	Team	Apps	(Gls)
2019–2021	Leeds United	1	(0)
2020–2021	→ Lincoln City (loan)	7	(0)
2021	→ Salford City (loan)	23	(3)
2021–2025	Barrow	154	(8)
2025–	Doncaster Rovers	50	(0)
- * Club domestic league appearances and goals as of 13:20, 22 November 2026 (UTC)

Robbie Gotts (born 9 November 1999) is an English professional footballer who plays for EFL League One club Doncaster Rovers, as a midfielder or right-back.

== Career ==
=== Leeds United ===
He impressed for Carlos Corberán's Leeds United under 23 side over the course of the 2018–19 season, winning the PDL Northern League 2018–19 season, then becoming the national Professional Development League champions by beating Birmingham City in the final.

As of 12 December 2019, he had featured on the first-team substitutes' bench over 30 times for the first team, but had yet to make his senior debut. He made his long-awaited debut by starting in the FA Cup on 6 January 2020 in a 1–0 defeat against Premier League side Arsenal at the Emirates Stadium.

After the English professional football season was paused in March 2020 due to COVID-19 pandemic, the season was resumed during June, where Gotts earned promotion with Leeds to the Premier League and also become the EFL Championship champions for the 2019-20 season in July.

Gotts won Leeds United's Academy Player of the Year award at the club's end of season awards on 24 July 2020.

On 15 October 2020, Gotts joined Lincoln City on a season-long loan deal. He made his debut at home against Portsmouth on 3 November 2020 and scored his first goal in what would be his final game, a EFL Trophy tie against Accrington Stanley on 12 January 2021. He was recalled by Leeds United a few days later and immediately sent on loan to Salford City for the remainder of the season. He was cup-tied for Salford's victory in the 2020 EFL Trophy Final (played in March 2021).

=== Barrow ===
Gotts left Leeds and signed for Barrow on 31 August 2021. He won Player of the Year in his first season with the Bluebirds.

He was offered a new contract at the end of the 2024–25 season.

=== Doncaster Rovers ===
On 15 May 2025, Gotts agreed to join recently crowned League Two champions Doncaster Rovers on 1 July 2025, on a two-year deal with the option for a further twelve months. On 2 August 2025 Gotts made his competitive debut for Doncaster against Exeter City, after coming off the bench in the 27th Minute for Jamie Sterry.

On 12 August 2025 Gotts scored his first goal for Doncaster, in a 4–0 victory away at Middlesbrough in the EFL Cup first round.

In November 2026, Gotts signed a new contract, extending his deal until the summer of 2029, with an option for a further year.

== Style of play ==
Gotts was primarily a right-back but was converted by Marcelo Bielsa to play as a central midfielder. Bielsa described that he had never seen a player as "dynamic" as Gotts in his career, saying that "he's a number eight, a midfielder. He is not offensive and not defensive. He's a number eight."

== Career statistics ==
As of match played 21 November 2026

Appearances and goals by club, season and competition
Club	Season	League			FA Cup		League Cup		Other		Total	
Club	Season	Division	Apps	Goals	Apps	Goals	Apps	Goals	Apps	Goals	Apps	Goals
Leeds United	2019–20	Championship	1	0	1	0	0	0	0	0	2	0
Leeds United	2020–21	Premier League	0	0	0	0	1	0	0	0	1	0
Leeds United	Total		1	0	1	0	1	0	0	0	3	0
Lincoln City (loan)	2020–21	League One	7	0	2	0	0	0	3	1	12	1
Salford City (loan)	2020–21	League Two	23	3	0	0	0	0	0	0	23	3
Barrow	2021–22	League Two	35	2	3	1	0	0	1	0	39	3
Barrow	2022–23	League Two	37	1	0	0	2	0	2	0	41	1
Barrow	2023–24	League Two	41	2	1	0	1	0	2	0	45	2
Barrow	2024–25	League Two	41	3	1	0	2	0	1	0	45	3
Barrow	Total		154	8	5	0	5	0	6	0	170	9
Doncaster Rovers	2025–26	League One	36	0	2	0	2	1	4	2	44	3
Doncaster Rovers	2026–27	League One	14	0	1	0	1	0	2	0	18	0
Doncaster Rovers	Total		50	0	3	0	3	1	6	2	62	3
Career total			235	11	11	1	9	1	15	3	270	16

== Honours ==
Individual

- Barrow Player of the Year: 2021–22
- Leeds United Academy Player of the Year: 2019–20
