= Thimothée Lo-Tutala =

French footballer (born 2003)

Personal information
- Full name: Thimothée Jacques Orcel Lo-Tutala
- Date of birth: 13 February 2003 (age 23)
- Place of birth: Gonesse, France
- Height: 1.85 m (6 ft 1 in)
- Position: Goalkeeper

Team information
- Current team: Colchester United (on loan from Hull City)
- Number: 22

Youth career
- 2013–2014: West Ham United
- 2015–2016: Brentford
- 2016–2022: Tottenham Hotspur

Senior career*
Years	Team	Apps	(Gls)
2022–	Hull City	0	(0)
2023	→ Stevenage (loan)	7	(0)
2024	→ Doncaster Rovers (loan)	18	(0)
2025	→ Crawley Town (loan)	1	(0)
2025–2026	→ Doncaster Rovers (loan)	33	(0)
2026–	→ Colchester United (loan)	15	(0)

International career^{‡}
2021–2022	France U19	14	(0)
2022–2023	France U20	5	(0)
- * Club domestic league appearances and goals as of 14:28, 22 November 2026 (UTC) ‡ National team caps and goals as of 06:30, 31 March 2025 (UTC)

Thimothée Jacques Orcel Lo-Tutala (born 13 February 2003) is a French professional footballer who plays as a goalkeeper for EFL League Two club Colchester United on loan from Premier League club Hull City.

== Early life ==
Born in Gonesse, Paris, France, Lo-Tutala grew up in Essex in England.

== Club career ==
Lo-Tutala spent his early career with West Ham United, Brentford and Tottenham Hotspur. After leaving Tottenham in the summer of 2022, he signed for Hull City in August 2022.

In April 2023 he signed an emergency loan with Stevenage, making his senior debut on 7 April 2023, and becoming the seventh goalkeeper to play for Stevenage in the 2022–23 season.

On 1 February 2024, Lo-Tutala moved on loan to Doncaster Rovers for the rest of the 2023–24 season. During his spell, he made 20 appearances in all competitions, including participation in the League Two play-offs, and kept eight clean sheets as the club secured a play-off place

On 11 September 2024, Lo-Tutala signed a contract extension with Hull City keeping him at the club until 2028.

On 21 March 2025, Lo-Tutala joined League One side Crawley Town on a seven-day emergency loan.

On 16 June 2025, Lo-Tutala returned to Doncaster Rovers on a season-long loan deal following their promotion to League One. On 10 February, in a quarter-final tie against Huddersfield Town in the EFL Trophy, he had a standout performance, making several key saves during the match and saving three penalties in the shootout to help Doncaster progress; he was subsequently named Player of the Round

On 6 August, Lo-Tutala joined Colchester United on a season-long loan deal.

== International career ==
Lo-Tutala is a France youth international, and by August 2022 he had 14 caps for their under-19 team. In June 2022, he was included in the French squad that took part in the UEFA European Under-19 Championship, where the Bleuets reached the semi-finals before losing to eventual runners-up Israel. He was called up to the France U20s for the 2023 FIFA U-20 World Cup.

== Career statistics ==
As of match played 21 November 2026

Club	Season	League			FA Cup		EFL Cup		Other		Total	
Club	Season	Division	Apps	Goals	Apps	Goals	Apps	Goals	Apps	Goals	Apps	Goals
Tottenham Hotspur U21	2021–22	—			—		—		1 (Note: Appearance(s) in EFL Trophy)	0	1	0
Hull City	2022–23	Championship	0	0	0	0	0	0	—		0	0
Hull City	2023–24	Championship	0	0	0	0	0	0	—		0	0
Hull City	2024–25	Championship	0	0	0	0	0	0	—		0	0
Hull City	2025–26	Championship	0	0	0	0	0	0	—		0	0
Hull City	2026–27	Premier League	0	0	0	0	0	0	—		0	0
Hull City	Total		0	0	0	0	0	0	0	0	0	0
Stevenage (loan)	2022–23	League Two	7	0	0	0	0	0	0	0	7	0
Doncaster Rovers (loan)	2023–24	League Two	18	0	0	0	0	0	2 (Note: Appearances in League Two play-offs)	0	20	0
Crawley Town (loan)	2024–25	League One	1	0	0	0	0	0	0	1	0	
Doncaster Rovers (loan)	2025–26	League One	33	0	3	0	0	0	3	0	39	0
Colchester United (loan)	2026–27	League Two	15	0	1	0	1	0	2	0	19	0
Career total			74	0	4	0	1	0	8	0	87	0
