= Seán Grehan =

Irish footballer (born 2004)

Personal information
- Full name: Seán Patrick Grehan
- Date of birth: 8 January 2004 (age 22)
- Place of birth: Dublin, Ireland
- Height: 1.88 m (6 ft 2 in)
- Position: Centre-back

Team information
- Current team: Doncaster Rovers
- Number: 27

Youth career
- –: St. Kevin's
- –2022: Bohemians
- 2022–2023: Crystal Palace

Senior career*
Years	Team	Apps	(Gls)
2021–2022	Bohemians	0	(0)
2023–2025	Crystal Palace	0	(0)
2024	→ Carlisle United (loan)	3	(0)
2025	→ Bohemians (loan)	18	(3)
2025–	Doncaster Rovers	21	(1)

International career^{‡}
2022	Republic of Ireland U19	9	(1)
2023–2026	Republic of Ireland U21	20	(2)
- * Club domestic league appearances and goals as of 10 September 2026 (UTC) ‡ National team caps and goals as of 00:08, 18 November 2026 (UTC)

Seán Patrick Grehan (born 8 January 2004) is an Irish professional footballer who plays as a centre-back for League One club Doncaster Rovers. He is a Republic of Ireland youth international.

== Club career ==
=== Bohemians ===
From Dublin, Grehan came through the youth system at St. Kevin's before joining Bohemians at U17 level. He featured in the first team for the first time in the FAI Cup against College Corinthians in July 2021.

=== Crystal Palace ===
He signed for Premier League club Crystal Palace in August 2022 following a trial. Grehan signed a new three-year contract with Palace in December 2023.

==== Carlisle United ====
In January 2024, he signed on loan with Carlisle United. On 3 February 2024, Grehan made his professional debut as a late substitute in Carlisle's 3–2 defeat away to Leyton Orient.

==== Bohemians loan ====
On 21 February 2025, it was announced that Grehan had returned to Bohemians on loan until June 2025. He made 18 appearances during his loan spell, scoring 3 goals before returning to Palace.

=== Doncaster Rovers ===
On 24 June 2025, Grehan signed for newly promoted EFL League One club Doncaster Rovers on a three-year contract for an undisclosed fee.

== International career ==
In 2022, Grehan received a call-up to the Republic of Ireland U19 side making nine appearances in total. The following season he made his debut for the Republic of Ireland U21 side.

== Style of play ==
He has been described as a versatile defender that can play on the right or left side as a centre-back, and can also pass the ball out from the back.

== Career statistics ==
As of match played on 13 June 2025

Appearances and goals by club, season and competition
Club	Season	League			National Cup (Note: Includes FAI Cup & FA Cup)		League Cup (Note: Includes EFL Cup)		Other		Total	
Club	Season	Division	Apps	Goals	Apps	Goals	Apps	Goals	Apps	Goals	Apps	Goals
Bohemians	2021	LOI Premier Division	0	0	1	0	—		0	0	1	0
Bohemians	2022	LOI Premier Division	0	0	0	0	—		—		0	0
Bohemians	Total		0	0	1	0	—		0	0	1	0
Crystal Palace	2023–24	Premier League	0	0	0	0	0	0	—		0	0
Crystal Palace	2024–25	Premier League	0	0	0	0	0	0	—		0	0
Total			0	0	0	0	0	0	—		0	0
Carlisle United (loan)	2023–24	EFL League One	3	0	—		—		—		3	0
Bohemians (loan)	2025	LOI Premier Division	18	3	—		—		0	0	18	3
Doncaster Rovers	2025–26	EFL League One	17	0	0	0	0	0	0	0	0	0
Doncaster Rovers	2026–27	EFL League One	6	1	0	0	2	0	2	0	8	1
Career total			21	3	1	0	0	0	0	0	22	3
