= Francis Okoronkwo =

English footballer (born 2004)

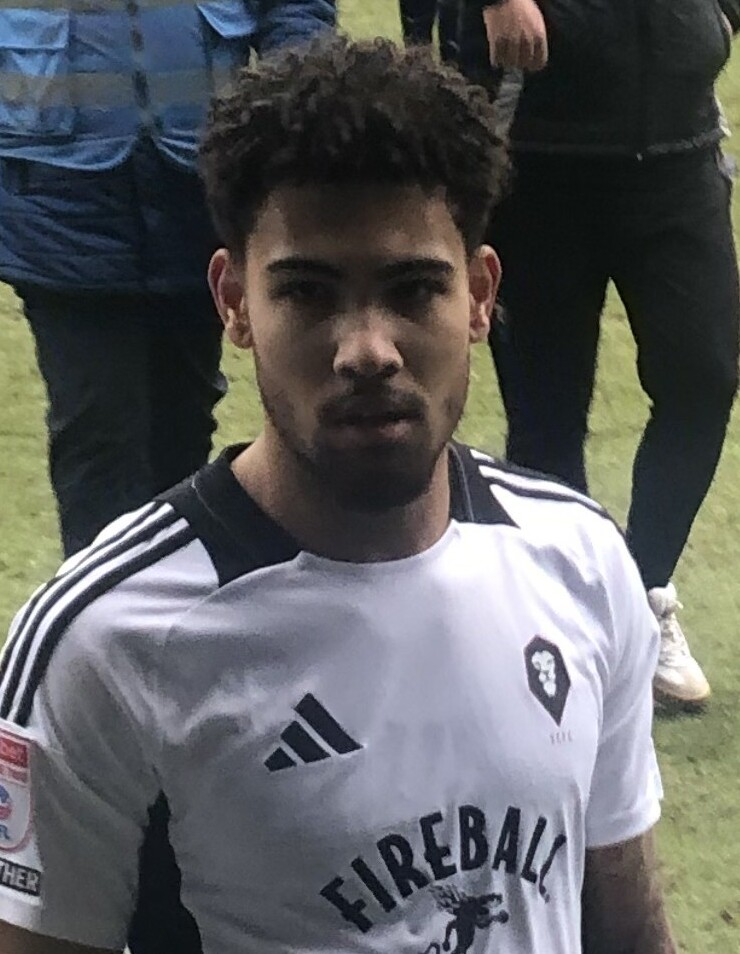
- Okoronkwo in 2025

Personal information
- Full name: Francis Okereke Okoronkwo
- Date of birth: 18 September 2004 (age 22)
- Place of birth: Blyth, England
- Height: 1.86 m (6 ft 1 in)
- Position: Forward

Team information
- Current team: Doncaster Rovers
- Number: 14

Youth career
- Sunderland
- 2021–2024: Everton

Senior career*
Years	Team	Apps	(Gls)
2024–2026	Everton	0	(0)
2024–2025	→ Salford City (loan)	22	(3)
2025–2026	→ Lincoln City (loan)	13	(1)
2026	→ Doncaster Rovers (loan)	3	(1)
2026–	Doncaster Rovers	0	(0)
- * Club domestic league appearances and goals as of 21:31, 27 January 2026 (UTC)

Francis Okereke Okoronkwo (born 18 September 2004) is an English professional footballer who plays as a forward for Doncaster Rovers.

== Career ==
Okoronkwo began his career with Sunderland, moving to Everton for £1 million in 2021. He signed a new contract with Everton in November 2023, and signed on loan for Salford City in August 2024. He scored on his debut, in a 1–0 home victory against MK Dons on 2 September 2024.

On 18 August 2025, Okoronkwo joined League One side Lincoln City on loan for the 2025-26 season. He made his debut coming off the bench against Northampton Town replacing James Collins in the 82nd minute to help Lincoln City win 1–0. He scored his first goal for the club in an EFL Trophy game against Barnsley. He scored his first League One goal in the following game, against Doncaster Rovers in a 2–1 victory. He returned to Everton in January having played 20 times and scoring twice.

On 6 January 2026, the same day he left Lincoln City, he joined League One side Doncaster Rovers on loan for the remainder of the season.

On 9 June 2026, Everton announced that they were releasing Okoronkwo at the expiration of his contract that summer. He returned to Doncaster Rovers on a two-year contract from 1 July 2026.

== Personal life ==
Born in England, Okoronkwo is of Nigerian descent.

== Career statistics ==
As of 27 January 2026

Appearances and goals by club, season and competition
Club	Season	League			National cup		League cup		Other		Total	
Club	Season	Division	Apps	Goals	Apps	Goals	Apps	Goals	Apps	Goals	Apps	Goals
Everton U21	2022–23	—	—		—		—		5 (Note: Appearance(s) in EFL Trophy)	1	5	1
Everton U21	2023–24	—	—		—		—		3	0	3	0
Everton U21	2024–25	—	—		—		—		1	0	1	0
Everton U21	Total		—		—		—		9	1	9	1
Salford City (loan)	2024–25	League Two	22	3	2	1	0	0	0	0	24	4
Lincoln City (loan)	2025–26	League One	13	1	1	0	2	0	4	1	20	2
Doncaster Rovers (loan)	2025–26	League One	3	1	1	0	0	0	1	0	5	1
Career total			38	5	4	1	2	0	14	2	58	8
