= Joe Sbarra =

English footballer (born 1998)

Personal information
- Full name: Joseph Christopher Sbarra
- Date of birth: 21 December 1998 (age 27)
- Place of birth: Lichfield, England
- Height: 5 ft 6 in (1.68 m)
- Position: Midfielder

Team information
- Current team: Solihull Moors

Youth career
- West Bromwich Albion
- –2017: Burton Albion

Senior career*
Years	Team	Apps	(Gls)
2017–2020	Burton Albion	49	(1)
2019	→ Solihull Moors (loan)	6	(0)
2020–2024	Solihull Moors	132	(34)
2024–2026	Doncaster Rovers	50	(3)
2025–2026	→ Solihull Moors (loan)	27	(10)
2026–	Solihull Moors	16	(0)

International career
2022–2023	England C	2	(0)
- * Club domestic league appearances and goals as of 17:01, 29 April 2026 (UTC)

Joseph Christopher Sbarra (born 21 December 1998) is an English professional footballer who plays as a midfielder for National League club Solihull Moors. He began his footballing career through the youth academy of EFL Championship club West Bromwich Albion. He will become a free agent on 30 June 2026.

== Career ==
=== Burton Albion ===
Sbarra came up through the youth academy at Burton Albion and made his debut on the last day of the 2016–17 season, coming on in the 68 minute against Reading aged 18. On 10 November 2017, Sbarra was rewarded for his breakthrough with a new contract that would see him stay with the club until 2020. Sbarra had to wait until the 2019–20 season to score his first senior goal, opening the scoring three minutes into a 2–2 draw with Portsmouth.

==== Solihull Moors (loan) ====
On 25 March 2019, Sbarra joined Solihull Moors on loan until the end of the season. The following day Sbarra came off of the bench in the 70 minute of a 2–2 draw with Boreham Wood and had to wait until the last day of the season to make his first start in a 1–1 draw with Dagenham & Redbridge. Sbarra made a total of six appearances as Solihull narrowly missed out on automatic promotion before losing in the playoffs.

=== Solihull Moors ===
On 5 August 2020, Sbarra returned to Solihull Moors on a free transfer following his release from Burton Albion, signing a two-year deal. He made his debut on 3 October against Woking on the opening day of the season and opened his account for the club the following week in a 5–0 thrashing of King's Lynn Town.

Following the conclusion of the 2023–24 season, the club confirmed that Sbarra would be leaving the club upon the expiration of his contract. His time at the club ultimately ended in disappointment as the club were defeated in the play-off final and the FA Trophy final within a week of each other.

=== Doncaster Rovers ===
On 20 May 2024, Sbarra agreed to join League Two club Doncaster Rovers on a two-year deal with the option for a further year.

On 3 May 2025, Doncaster secured the League Two title on the final day of the season, earning automatic promotion to EFL League One.

In November 2025, Sbarra returned to National League club Solihull Moors on an initial two-month loan deal. In January 2026, this loan was extended for the remainder of the season.

He was released upon the expiry of his contract at the end of the 2025–26 season.

=== Return to Solihull Moors ===
On 16 June, it was announced Sbarra would rejoin Solihull Moors

== International career ==
Sbarra was called up to the England C team for a friendly against Wales C in March 2022.

== Career statistics ==
As of match played 28 April 2026

Appearances and goals by club, season and competition
Club	Season	League			FA Cup		League Cup		Other		Total	
Club	Season	Division	Apps	Goals	Apps	Goals	Apps	Goals	Apps	Goals	Apps	Goals
Burton Albion	2016–17	Championship	1	0	0	0	0	0	—		1	0
Burton Albion	2017–18	Championship	17	0	1	0	2	0	—		20	0
Burton Albion	2018–19	League One	9	0	0	0	4	0	3 (Note: Appearances in EFL Trophy.)	0	16	0
Burton Albion	2019–20	League One	22	1	4	0	4	0	3	0	33	1
Burton Albion	Total		49	1	5	0	10	0	6	0	70	1
Solihull Moors (loan)	2018–19	National League	6	0	—		—		0	0	6	0
Solihull Moors	2020–21	National League	34	6	3	2	—		2 (Note: Appearance(s) in FA Trophy)	0	39	8
Solihull Moors	2021–22	National League	44	18	3	0	—		5 (Note: Three appearances in FA Trophy and two appearances in National League play-offs)	0	52	18
Solihull Moors	2022–23	National League	33	9	3	1	—		1	1	37	11
Solihull Moors	2023–24	National League	21	1	0	0	—		5 (Note: Two appearances and one goal in FA Trophy and three appearances and two goals in National League play-offs)	3	26	4
Solihull Moors	Total		132	34	9	3	—		13	4	154	41
Doncaster Rovers	2024–25	League Two	39	2	2	0	2	0	4	1	35	2
Doncaster Rovers	2025–26	League One	11	1	0	0	3	0	2	1	8	1
Doncaster Rovers	Total		30	1	2	0	5	0	6	2	43	3
Solihull Moors (loan)	2025–26	National League	27	10	—		—		1	0	28	10
Career total			244	46	16	3	15	0	26	6	301	55

== Honours ==
Solihull Moors

- FA Trophy runner-up: 2023–24

Doncaster Rovers

- EFL League Two: 2024–25

Individual

- National League Team of the Season: 2021–22
- Solihull Moors Players' Player of the Season: 2021–22
- Solihull Moors Supporters' Player of the Season: 2021–22
- Solihull Moors Supporters Association Player of the Season: 2021–22
- Solihull Moors Goal of the Season: 2021–22
