= Sam Straughan-Brown =

English footballer

Personal information
- Full name: Sam Ellis Straughan-Brown
- Date of birth: 24 September 2006 (age 20)
- Place of birth: Retford, England
- Height: 1.76 m (5 ft 9 in)
- Position: Midfielder

Team information
- Current team: Spalding United (on loan from Doncaster Rovers)
- Number: 26

Youth career
- 2014–2023: Doncaster Rovers

Senior career*
Years	Team	Apps	(Gls)
2023–	Doncaster Rovers	1	(0)
2025	→ Bradford (Park Avenue) (loan)	8	(0)
2025	→ Peterborough Sports	10	(0)
2025–2026	→ Peterborough Sports (loan)	25	(2)
2026–	→ Spalding United (loan)	17	(1)
- * Club domestic league appearances and goals as of 13:29, 21 November 2026 (UTC)

Sam Straughan-Brown (born 24 September 2006) is an English footballer who plays as a midfielder for EFL League One club Doncaster Rovers.

== Early life ==
Hailing from Retford, Straughan-Brown joined Doncaster Rovers at under-9 level, the youngest age group for the academy.

== Career ==
On 30 August 2023, Straughan-Brown made his senior debut in an EFL Cup defeat to Everton, coming off the bench in the 83rd minute. In October 2023, he signed a first professional contract with the club, manager Grant McCann labelling him as one of the best young players that he had worked with in quite some time. On 1 January 2024, he made his League Two debut, again as a late substitute, in a 3–0 victory over Milton Keynes Dons.

On 1 January 2025, Straughan-Brown joined Northern Premier League Division One East side Bradford (Park Avenue) on a short-term youth loan. On 28 February, he joined National League North side Peterborough Sports on a similar loan. On 1 July, he returned to Peterborough Sports on a season-long loan deal.

== Career statistics ==
As of 14 February 2026

Appearances and goals by club, season and competition
Club	Season	League			FA Cup		League Cup		Other		Total	
Club	Season	Division	Apps	Goals	Apps	Goals	Apps	Goals	Apps	Goals	Apps	Goals
Doncaster Rovers	2023–24	League Two	1	0	0	0	1	0	0	0	2	0
Doncaster Rovers	2024–25	League Two	0	0	0	0	0	0	2 (Note: Appearance(s) in EFL Trophy)	0	2	0
Doncaster Rovers	Total		1	0	0	0	1	0	2	0	4	0
Bradford (Park Avenue) (loan)	2024–25	Northern Premier League Division One East	8	0	0	0	—		0	0	8	0
Peterborough Sports (loan)	2024–25	National League North	10	0	0	0	—		0	0	10	0
Peterborough Sports (loan)	2025–26	National League North	25	2	0	0	—		3	0	28	2
Peterborough Sports (loan)	Total		35	2	0	0	—		0	0	38	2
Career total			44	2	0	0	1	0	5	0	50	2
