= James Maxwell (footballer, born 2001) =

Scottish footballer (born 2001)

Personal information
- Full name: James Ian Maxwell
- Date of birth: 9 December 2001 (age 24)
- Place of birth: Crewe, England
- Height: 1.79 m (5 ft 10 in)
- Position: Left-back

Team information
- Current team: Northampton Town
- Number: 3

Youth career
- 2010–2015: Ayr United
- 2015–2018: Falkirk
- 2019–2020: Rangers

Senior career*
Years	Team	Apps	(Gls)
2020–2022	Rangers	0	(0)
2020–2021	→ Queen of the South (loan)	26	(3)
2021–2022	→ Ayr United (loan)	34	(5)
2022–2026	Doncaster Rovers	94	(4)
2026–	Northampton Town	11	(0)
- * Club domestic league appearances and goals as of 12 November 2026 (UTC)

James Ian Maxwell (born 9 December 2001) is a Scottish footballer, who plays as a left-back for EFL League Two club Northampton Town.

== Career ==
Maxwell was with Ayr United and Falkirk's youth academies before signing as a pro youth for Rangers.

Maxwell signed on loan with Scottish Championship club Queen of the South for the 2020-21 season. Maxwell had 32 appearances and scored 5 goals for the Dumfries club.

During July 2021, Maxwell signed on loan with Scottish Championship club Ayr United for the 2021-22 season.

On 7 July 2022, Maxwell confirmed that he had left Rangers.

On 21 July 2022, Maxwell moved south of the border for the first time in his career when he joined EFL League Two club Doncaster Rovers. He departed the club at the end of the 2025–26 season.

On 23 June 2026, Maxwell agreed to join Northampton Town on a two-year deal following the club's relegation to League Two.

== Career statistics ==
As of 8 August 2026

Appearances and goals by club, season and competition
Club	Season	League			FA Cup		League Cup		Other		Total	
Club	Season	Division	Apps	Goals	Apps	Goals	Apps	Goals	Apps	Goals	Apps	Goals
Rangers U21	2019–20	–							6 (Note: Appearances in the Scottish Challenge Cup)	0	6	0
Rangers	2020–21	Scottish Premiership	0	0	0	0	0	0	0	0	0	0
Queen of the South (loan)	2020–21	Scottish Championship	26	3	2	1	4	1	0	0	32	5
Ayr United	2021–22	Scottish Championship	34	5	2	1	1	0	0	0	37	6
Doncaster Rovers	2022–23	League Two	29	2	1	0	1	0	3 (Note: Appearances in the EFL Trophy)	0	34	2
Doncaster Rovers	2023–24	League Two	22	2	2	0	2	0	4 (Note: Two appearances in EFL Trophy, two appearances in EFL League Two play-offs)	0	30	2
Doncaster Rovers	2024–25	League Two	24	0	3	0	0	0	0	0	27	0
Doncaster Rovers	2025–26	League One	19	0	3	0	1	0	3	0	26	0
Doncaster Rovers	Total		94	4	9	0	4	0	10	0	117	4
Northampton Town	2026–27	League Two	0	0	0	0	1	0	0	0	0	0
Career total			154	12	13	2	10	1	16	0	192	15

== Honours ==
Doncaster Rovers

- EFL League Two: 2024–25
