= Bayley McCann =

Northern Irish footballer (born 2005)

Personal information
- Date of birth: 8 December 2005 (age 20)
- Place of birth: Cheltenham, England
- Position: Left back

Team information
- Current team: Doncaster Rovers
- Number: 25

Youth career
- Peterborough United
- 2023–2024: Barnsley

Senior career*
Years	Team	Apps	(Gls)
2022–2023	Peterborough United	0	(0)
2024–2025	Barnsley	1	(0)
2024–2025	→ Peterborough Sports (loan)	21	(2)
2025	→ Peterborough Sports (loan)	7	(1)
2025	→ Alfreton Town (loan)	8	(1)
2026–	Doncaster Rovers	10	(1)
2026	→ Alfreton Town (loan)	14	(0)

International career^{‡}
2019	Northern Ireland U16	2	(0)
2025–	Northern Ireland U21	5	(1)
- * Club domestic league appearances and goals as of 22:47, 27 October 2026 (UTC) ‡ National team caps and goals as of 22:49, 17 October 2026 (UTC)

Bayley McCann (born 8 December 2005) is a Northern Irish professional footballer who plays as a left back for EFL League One club Doncaster Rovers and the Northern Ireland national under-21 football team.

== Early and personal life ==
McCann was born in Cheltenham, England, as the first of three sons of Northern Irish footballer Grant McCann, who was then playing for Cheltenham Town. Michael Duff, who played alongside his father for Cheltenham and Northern Ireland, is his godfather. He was mainly raised in Peterborough, where his father was a player and manager for Peterborough United.

== Club career ==
=== Peterborough United ===
McCann was a youth player at Peterborough United from under-10 level. He played as a striker until under-15 level, when he was moved to left winger and then left back. Before his under-16 season, the under-18 team had an injury to their left back and McCann was promoted, earning a scholarship with the club. On 16 November 2022, he was an unused substitute for the first team managed by his father, in a 3–0 win away to Salford City in the first round of the FA Cup; his father said this was to cover the injury of Joe Tomlinson.

=== Barnsley ===
In 2023, McCann moved to Barnsley, after the club made contact with his father. On 7 August 2024, he played for the under-21 team in the afternoon and made his first-team debut in the evening, a 3–2 home loss to Manchester United under-21s in the EFL Trophy, as a 73rd-minute substitute for Kyran Lofthouse. In the tournament's next game on 29 October, he started in a 3–1 loss at Oakwell to Doncaster Rovers, who were managed by his father. Days later, he was loaned to Peterborough Sports in the National League North. Having returned from loan, he made his English Football League debut on 8 March 2025 as a late substitute in a 3–0 home loss to Blackpool.

=== Doncaster Rovers ===
In July 2025, after signing a new contract at Barnsley, McCann was loaned again to Peterborough Sports. From November until March 2026, he was loaned to Alfreton Town also in the National League North; on 2 January he transferred to his father's Doncaster on a free transfer on a two-and-a-half year deal. He made his debut on 25 April in a 1–1 home draw with Stevenage, as a substitute; he then told the press that accusations of nepotism motivated him to play his best. On 27 October, he scored his first EFL goal and first competitive goal for Doncaster, as consolation in a 3–1 loss away to Luton Town.

== International career ==
In September 2019, aged 13, McCann made his international debut for Northern Ireland under-16 in two friendly matches against Finland.

McCann scored his first goal for Northern Ireland under-21 on 26 September 2026, in a 4–0 win over Malta in 2027 UEFA European Under-21 Championship qualification.
