= Grant McCann =

Northern Irish football player and manager (born 1980)

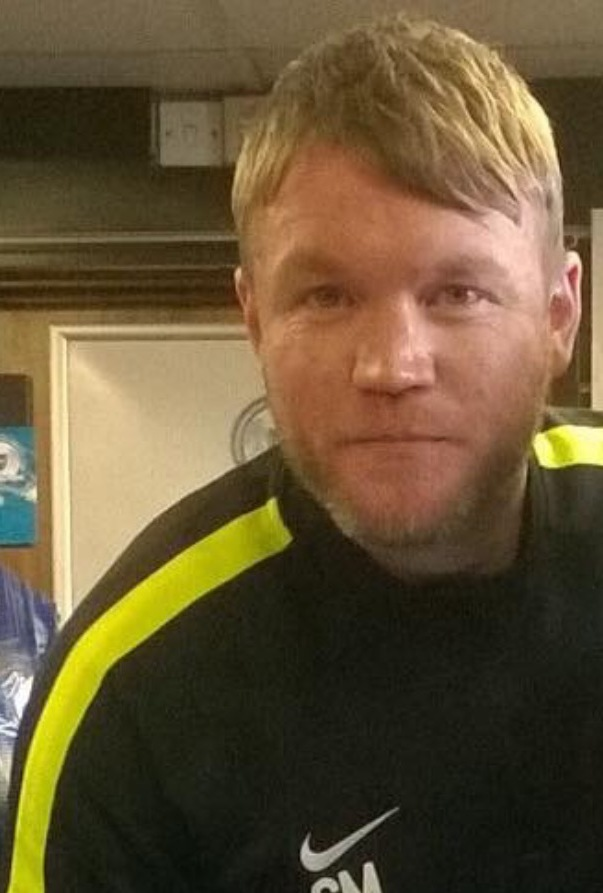
- McCann in 2016

Personal information
- Full name: Grant Samuel McCann
- Date of birth: 14 April 1980 (age 46)
- Place of birth: Belfast, Northern Ireland
- Position: Midfielder

Team information
- Current team: Doncaster Rovers (manager)

Youth career
- Lisburn Youth
- 1995–1996: Distillery
- 1996–1998: West Ham United

Senior career*
Years	Team	Apps	(Gls)
1998–2003	West Ham United	4	(0)
1999	→ Livingston (loan)	4	(0)
2000	→ Notts County (loan)	2	(0)
2000–2001	→ Cheltenham Town (loan)	30	(3)
2002	→ Cheltenham Town (loan)	8	(0)
2003–2007	Cheltenham Town	155	(31)
2006–2007	→ Barnsley (loan)	7	(1)
2007–2008	Barnsley	34	(3)
2008–2010	Scunthorpe United	99	(18)
2010–2015	Peterborough United	160	(29)
2015	Linfield	5	(1)
Total		508	(86)

International career
2000–2001	Northern Ireland U21	11	(3)
2001–2012	Northern Ireland	39	(4)

Managerial career
- 2015: Peterborough United (caretaker)
- 2016–2018: Peterborough United
- 2018–2019: Doncaster Rovers
- 2019–2022: Hull City
- 2022–2023: Peterborough United
- 2023–: Doncaster Rovers
- * Club domestic league appearances and goals

Grant Samuel McCann (born 14 April 1980) is a Northern Irish professional football manager and former player who played as a midfielder in the Football League. He is the manager of EFL League One club Doncaster Rovers.

McCann also won 39 caps for Northern Ireland after making his senior debut against Malta in 2001, with the last of his 39 caps gained against the Netherlands in June 2012.

== Club career ==
=== West Ham and loans ===
Born in Belfast, McCann played for Lisburn Youth and in the Distillery youth system from 1995 until signing for the West Ham United Academy of Football in 1996, where he started his professional career. He made his debut on 19 May 2001 in a 2–1 away defeat to Middlesbrough.

Finding it hard to break into the West Ham first team, McCann had loan spells at Livingston and Notts County before moving to Cheltenham Town, in another loan deal, in 2000. He made a handful of substitute appearances for West Ham and never starting a game. He scored an own goal during a 1–7 away defeat to Blackburn Rovers on 14 October 2001; after coming off the bench, he attempted a clearance from inside his own penalty area but the ball somehow spun backwards behind him and past Shaka Hislop in the West Ham goal. This turned out to be McCann's final appearance for West Ham.

=== Cheltenham Town ===
After another loan deal took him back to Cheltenham in 2002, the move was made permanent during the January 2003 transfer window when he moved from West Ham for £50,000, a record transfer fee for Cheltenham Town. McCann went on to make 155 league appearances for the Gloucestershire club. He had made only four substitute appearances for The Hammers.

=== Barnsley ===
He joined Barnsley on loan deadline day, 23 November 2006, in a contract that expired on 1 January 2007. On his debut against Ipswich Town, he scored a 92nd-minute winner in Simon Davey's first game as caretaker boss. The two clubs agreed a fee of £100,000 and McCann moved to Barnsley permanently on 2 January 2007. At the time this was a record fee for an outbound player from Cheltenham.

=== Scunthorpe ===
In January 2008, McCann left Barnsley to sign for Championship rivals Scunthorpe United for an undisclosed fee.

=== Peterborough United ===
On 24 May 2010, Peterborough United announced that they had beaten off competition from a host of Championship clubs to secure the services of McCann on a three-year contract. On 1 August, McCann was named the captain for the 2010–11 League One season, taking the role from George Boyd. He continued to hold this position for the 2011–12 season.

McCann has been promoted via a play-off three times – once each with three clubs at three Stadiums – with Cheltenham Town at the Millennium Stadium, Cardiff, with Scunthorpe United at Wembley Stadium, London and with Peterborough United at Old Trafford, Manchester.

On 30 April 2012, McCann with seven other Peterborough players were placed on the transfer list by manager Darren Ferguson.

=== Linfield ===
On 14 January 2015, McCann returned to his native country to join NIFL Premiership side Linfield on a free transfer after his contract at Peterborough was terminated by mutual consent. He signed an initial six-month contract to last until the end of the 2014–15 season. McCann, who made close to 200 appearances in all competitions for Posh, had been assisting with the coaching of Peterborough's youth side in the weeks prior to his departure, but was keen to continue playing regularly. His brother, Ryan McCann, had previously played for Linfield between 2002 and 2005, winning several trophies with the Blues including the league title in 2004 and the Setanta Cup in 2005.

On 23 February 2015, McCann was linked to a coaching role at his former club Peterborough United, following the sacking of Darren Ferguson two days earlier. It was assumed that McCann would balance his role at Peterborough with his playing time at Linfield. However, it was later confirmed that McCann would be ending his stay at Linfield after just six weeks. During his short spell at the club, he made six appearances in all competitions, scoring once against Ballymena United in a league game.

On 26 February 2015, Linfield confirmed that McCann's contract had been terminated with immediate effect, facilitating his return to Peterborough in a coaching capacity until at least the end of the 2014–15 season.

== Managerial career ==
=== Peterborough United ===
On 16 May 2016, McCann was appointed Peterborough United manager on a four-year contract. He was named League One Manager of the Month for August 2017, after his team got off to a flying start at the beginning of the season. On 25 February 2018, he was dismissed after no wins in seven matches.

=== Doncaster Rovers ===
On 27 June 2018, McCann was announced as the new Doncaster Rovers manager. He led them to the play-offs on the final day of the season, 4 May 2019, with a 2–0 win over Coventry City. They finished in sixth place in the League One table. They lost to Charlton Athletic in the play-off semi-final stages. After two legs the aggregate score was 4–4 with Charlton winning 4–3 on penalties.

=== Hull City ===
McCann was appointed as head coach of Championship club Hull City on 21 June 2019 on a one-year rolling contract. City vice-chairman and son of owner Assem Allam, Ehab Allam said of McCann's appointment, "Grant has been a standout candidate with a playing style and philosophy aligned to that of the Club. With a great team of existing staff in their support and of the squad too, I hope for an exciting season ahead." On 14 July 2020, Hull lost 8–0 at Wigan Athletic, equalling their record loss to Wolverhampton Wanderers in November 1911. The result put Hull in the bottom three by one point having won once in their past 18 games with 14 defeats. Hull were relegated to League One in 24th and bottom place following a 3–0 defeat by Cardiff City on 22 July. Despite the relegation, McCann said he hoped to manage the team in the upcoming season.

McCann immediately led the team back to the Championship as League One Champions, winning promotion with two matches left to play after a 2–1 victory at Lincoln City. The title was secured the following match with a 3–1 victory over Wigan Athletic, as second-placed Peterborough United were held to a 3–3 draw, a result that still saw them promoted. McCann was awarded a number of individual awards over the season, winning the League One Manager of the Month for both January 2021 and April 2021, culminating in him being named 2020–21 EFL League One Manager of the Season at the league's annual awards ceremony.

On 25 January 2022, McCann was dismissed by the club following a takeover by a Turkish consortium. At the time the club were sitting in 19th position, ten points clear of the relegation zone.

=== Return to Peterborough United ===
On 24 February 2022, McCann returned to Peterborough United for a third spell, his second as manager. He was unable to save his side from relegation and they were immediately relegated back to League One on 23 April following a 1–0 home defeat to Nottingham Forest.

On 4 January 2023, McCann was dismissed with the club sitting in eighth position in League One, five points outside of the play-offs.

=== Return to Doncaster Rovers ===
On 12 May 2023, McCann returned to another of his former clubs when he was appointed manager of League Two club Doncaster Rovers. Despite having sat in 22nd position in February, McCann led Doncaster to a club record-equalling ten-match winning run, ending the season in the play-off positions, McCann being named the EFL League Two Manager of the Month for April 2024.

On 26 April 2025, Rovers were promoted to League One following a 2–1 victory over Bradford City. The following week, his side defeated Notts County on the final day of the season to clinch the League Two title.

== International career ==
McCann made his debut for the Northern Ireland national team on 6 October 2001 in a 1–0 away win against Malta. He opened his goalscoring account for Northern Ireland by scoring the last goal, a header, in the 4–1 away win against Liechtenstein on 24 March 2007. The last of his 39 caps was won in a 6–0 friendly defeat against the Netherlands in June 2012.

=== International goals ===
Scores and results list Northern Ireland's goal tally first.

No	Date	Venue	Opponent	Score	Result	Competition
1.	24 March 2007	Rheinpark Stadion, Vaduz, Liechtenstein	Liechtenstein	4–1	4–1	UEFA Euro 2008 qualifying
2.	15 October 2008	Windsor Park, Belfast, Northern Ireland	San Marino	2–0	4–0	2010 World Cup qualification
3.	11 February 2009	San Marino Stadium, Serravalle, San Marino	San Marino	2–0	3–0	2010 World Cup qualification
4.	12 August 2009	Windsor Park, Belfast, Northern Ireland	Israel	1–0	1–1	Friendly

== Personal life ==
After joining Peterborough United, McCann remained living in the city of Peterborough with his wife, Kelly, and their three sons. His first son Bayley played under him for Peterborough and Doncaster, and his third son was also in Peterborough's academy.

In December 2025, McCann noticed a blemish on his leg that he believed was a cold sore, but his wife believed it was more serious. It was removed by Doncaster's club doctor and confirmed to be melanoma. The following month, he had surgery and was told that the worst scenario would be that he would have five weeks to live, but he was finally given the all-clear. McCann did not tell the public about his treatment until September 2026, when he was asked about the "pressure" from Doncaster's poor start to the season.

== Career statistics ==
=== Playing statistics ===
Appearances and goals by club, season and competition
Club	Season	League			FA Cup		League Cup		Other		Total	
Club	Season	Division	Apps	Goals	Apps	Goals	Apps	Goals	Apps	Goals	Apps	Goals
West Ham United	1999–2000	Premier League	0	0	0	0	0	0	—		0	0
West Ham United	2000–01	Premier League	1	0	0	0	0	0	—		1	0
West Ham United	2001–02	Premier League	3	0	0	0	0	0	—		3	0
West Ham United	Total		4	0	0	0	0	0	0	0	4	0
Livingston (loan)	1999–2000	Scottish First Division	4	0	0	0	0	0	1 (Note: Appearances in Scottish Challenge Cup)	0	5	0
Notts County (loan)	2000–01	Second Division	2	0	0	0	1	0	0	0	3	0
Cheltenham Town (loan)	2000–01	Third Division	30	3	2	0	0	0	1 (Note: Appearances in Football League Trophy)	0	33	3
Cheltenham Town	2002–03	Second Division	27	6	0	0	0	0	2	1	29	7
Cheltenham Town	2003–04	Third Division	43	8	3	3	1	1	1	0	48	12
Cheltenham Town	2004–05	League Two	39	5	0	0	1	0	2	1	42	6
Cheltenham Town	2005–06	League Two	39	8	3	1	2	2	6 (Note: Three appearances in Football League Trophy and three in League Two play-offs)	0	50	11
Cheltenham Town	2006–07	League One	15	5	2	0	2	0	1	2	20	7
Cheltenham Town	Total		193	35	10	4	6	3	13	3	222	45
Barnsley	2006–07	Championship	22	1	0	0	0	0	0	0	22	1
Barnsley	2007–08	Championship	19	3	1	0	2	0	0	0	22	3
Barnsley	Total		41	4	1	0	2	0	0	0	44	4
Scunthorpe United	2007–08	Championship	14	1	0	0	0	0	0	0	14	1
Scunthorpe United	2008–09	League One	43	9	3	0	1	0	7 (Note: Four appearances in Football League Trophy and three in League One play-offs)	1	54	10
Scunthorpe United	2009–10	Championship	42	8	1	0	2	1	0	0	45	9
Scunthorpe United	Total		99	18	4	0	3	1	7	1	113	20
Peterborough United	2010–11	League One	38	9	4	1	1	0	3 (Note: Appearances League One play-offs)	3	46	13
Peterborough United	2011–12	Championship	41	8	0	0	1	0	0	0	42	8
Peterborough United	2012–13	Championship	40	8	1	0	2	0	0	0	43	8
Peterborough United	2013–14	League One	35	4	2	0	2	0	8 (Note: Six appearances in Football League Trophy and two in League One play-offs)	2	47	6
Peterborough United	2014–15	League One	6	0	0	0	1	0	1	0	8	0
Peterborough United	Total		160	29	7	1	7	0	12	5	186	35
Linfield	2015–16	NIFL Premiership	5	1	0	0	0	0	0	0	5	1
Career total			508	87	22	5	19	4	32	10	581	106

=== Managerial statistics ===
As of match played 21 November 2026

Managerial record by team and tenure
Team	From	To	Record					Ref.
Team	From	To	P	W	D	L	Win %	Ref.
Peterborough United (caretaker)	8 September 2015	21 September 2015	2	1	1	0	50.0	
Peterborough United	23 April 2016	25 February 2018	104	41	27	36	39.4	
Doncaster Rovers	27 June 2018	21 June 2019	59	27	14	18	45.8	
Hull City	21 June 2019	25 January 2022	136	53	29	54	39.0	
Peterborough United	24 February 2022	4 January 2023	48	18	8	22	37.5	
Doncaster Rovers	12 May 2023	Present	194	87	39	68	44.8	
Total			543	227	118	198	41.8	

== Honours ==
=== As a player ===
Cheltenham Town

- Football League Two play-offs: 2006

Scunthorpe United

- Football League One play-offs: 2009
- Football League Trophy runner-up: 2008–09

Peterborough United

- Football League One play-offs: 2011
- Football League Trophy: 2013–14

=== As a manager ===
Hull City

- EFL League One: 2020–21

Doncaster Rovers

- EFL League Two: 2024–25

Individual

- EFL League One Manager of the Month: August 2017, September 2018, January 2021, April 2021
- EFL League One Manager of the Season: 2020–21
- EFL League Two Manager of the Month: April 2024, April 2025
