= Stoneacre =

Stoneacre may refer to:

- Stoneacre (1884), a now-demolished mansion formerly located at the Frederick Law Olmsted Park
- Stoneacre, Kent, a small National Trust property in southern England
- Stoneacre Loop, the Stoneacre crossover on the Embsay and Bolton Abbey Steam Railway
- Stoneacre Motor Group, a UK-based car dealership group
