= 2013–14 Football League =

England and Wales football league

The Football League
- Season: 2013–14
- Champions: Leicester City
- Promoted: Leicester City; Burnley; Queens Park Rangers
- Relegated: Bristol Rovers; Torquay United
- New Clubs in League: Mansfield Town; Newport County

The 2013–14 Football League (known as the Sky Bet Football League for sponsorship reasons) was the 115th season of The Football League. It began on 3 August 2013 and concluded on 3 May 2014, with the promotion play-off finals at Wembley Stadium on 24–26 May 2014. The Football League is contested through three Divisions. The divisions are the Championship, League One and League Two. Leicester City, Burnley and Queens Park Rangers were promoted to the Premier League, while Bristol Rovers and Torquay United were relegated to the Conference Premier.

The 2013–14 season was the first in a five-year sponsorship agreement with betting company Sky Bet. As a result of the deal, the three Football League divisions were officially referred to as "The Sky Bet Championship", "Sky Bet League One" and "Sky Bet League Two".

== Promotion and relegation ==
=== From Premier League ===
Relegated to Championship

- Queens Park Rangers
- Reading
- Wigan Athletic

=== From Championship ===
Promoted to Premier League

- Cardiff City
- Hull City
- Crystal Palace

Relegated to League One

- Peterborough United
- Wolverhampton Wanderers
- Bristol City

=== From League One ===
Promoted to Championship

- Doncaster Rovers
- Bournemouth
- Yeovil Town

Relegated to League Two

- Scunthorpe United
- Bury
- Hartlepool United
- Portsmouth

=== From League Two ===
Promoted to League One

- Gillingham
- Rotherham United
- Port Vale
- Bradford City

Relegated to Conference Premier

- Barnet
- Aldershot Town

=== From Conference Premier ===
Promoted to League Two

- Mansfield Town
- Newport County

== Championship ==
=== Table ===
| Pos | Team | Pld | W | D | L | GF | GA | GD | Pts | Promotion, qualification or relegation |
|---|---|---|---|---|---|---|---|---|---|---|
| 1 | Leicester City (C, P) | 46 | 31 | 9 | 6 | 83 | 43 | +40 | 102 | Promotion to the Premier League |
| 2 | Burnley (P) | 46 | 26 | 15 | 5 | 72 | 37 | +35 | 93 | Promotion to the Premier League |
| 3 | Derby County | 46 | 25 | 10 | 11 | 84 | 52 | +32 | 85 | Qualification for Championship play-offs |
| 4 | Queens Park Rangers (O, P) | 46 | 23 | 11 | 12 | 60 | 44 | +16 | 80 | Qualification for Championship play-offs |
| 5 | Wigan Athletic | 46 | 21 | 10 | 15 | 61 | 48 | +13 | 73 | Qualification for Championship play-offs |
| 6 | Brighton & Hove Albion | 46 | 19 | 15 | 12 | 55 | 40 | +15 | 72 | Qualification for Championship play-offs |
| 7 | Reading | 46 | 19 | 14 | 13 | 70 | 56 | +14 | 71 | |
| 8 | Blackburn Rovers | 46 | 18 | 16 | 12 | 70 | 62 | +8 | 70 | |
| 9 | Ipswich Town | 46 | 18 | 14 | 14 | 60 | 54 | +6 | 68 | |
| 10 | Bournemouth | 46 | 18 | 12 | 16 | 67 | 66 | +1 | 66 | |
| 11 | Nottingham Forest | 46 | 16 | 17 | 13 | 67 | 64 | +3 | 65 | |
| 12 | Middlesbrough | 46 | 16 | 16 | 14 | 62 | 50 | +12 | 64 | |
| 13 | Watford | 46 | 15 | 15 | 16 | 74 | 64 | +10 | 60 | |
| 14 | Bolton Wanderers | 46 | 14 | 17 | 15 | 59 | 60 | −1 | 59 | |
| 15 | Leeds United | 46 | 16 | 9 | 21 | 59 | 67 | −8 | 57 | |
| 16 | Sheffield Wednesday | 46 | 13 | 14 | 19 | 63 | 65 | −2 | 53 | |
| 17 | Huddersfield Town | 46 | 14 | 11 | 21 | 58 | 65 | −7 | 53 | |
| 18 | Charlton Athletic | 46 | 13 | 12 | 21 | 41 | 61 | −20 | 51 | |
| 19 | Millwall | 46 | 11 | 15 | 20 | 46 | 74 | −28 | 48 | |
| 20 | Blackpool | 46 | 11 | 13 | 22 | 38 | 66 | −28 | 46 | |
| 21 | Birmingham City | 46 | 11 | 11 | 24 | 58 | 74 | −16 | 44 | |
| 22 | Doncaster Rovers (R) | 46 | 11 | 11 | 24 | 39 | 70 | −31 | 44 | Relegation to Football League One |
| 23 | Barnsley (R) | 46 | 9 | 12 | 25 | 44 | 77 | −33 | 39 | Relegation to Football League One |
| 24 | Yeovil Town (R) | 46 | 8 | 13 | 25 | 44 | 75 | −31 | 37 | Relegation to Football League One |

Source: BBC Sport
Rules for classification: 1) points; 2) goal difference; 3) number of goals scored
(C) Champions; (O) Play-off winners; (P) Promoted; (R) Relegated

=== Play-offs ===
Semifinals
3 | Derby County | 2 | 4 | 6
6 | Brighton & Hove Albion | 1 | 1 | 2
4 | QPR (a.e.t.) | 0 | 2 | 2
5 | Wigan | 0 | 1 | 1

Final
3 | Derby County | 0
4 | QPR | 1

=== Results ===
| Home \ Away | BAR | BIR | BLB | BLP | BOL | BOU | B&HA | BUR | CHA | DER | DON | HUD | IPS | LEE | LEI | MID | MIL | NOT | QPR | REA | SHW | WAT | WIG | YEO |
|---|---|---|---|---|---|---|---|---|---|---|---|---|---|---|---|---|---|---|---|---|---|---|---|---|
| Barnsley | | 0–3 | 2–2 | 2–0 | 0–1 | 0–1 | 0–0 | 0–1 | 2–2 | 1–2 | 0–0 | 2–1 | 2–2 | 0–1 | 0–3 | 3–2 | 1–0 | 1–0 | 2–3 | 1–1 | 1–1 | 1–5 | 0–4 | 1–1 |
| Birmingham City | 1–1 | | 2–4 | 1–1 | 1–2 | 2–4 | 0–1 | 3–3 | 0–1 | 3–3 | 1–1 | 1–2 | 1–1 | 1–3 | 1–2 | 2–2 | 4–0 | 0–0 | 0–2 | 1–2 | 4–1 | 0–1 | 0–1 | 0–2 |
| Blackburn Rovers | 5–2 | 2–3 | | 2–0 | 4–1 | 0–1 | 3–3 | 1–2 | 0–1 | 1–1 | 1–0 | 0–0 | 2–0 | 1–0 | 1–1 | 1–0 | 3–2 | 0–1 | 2–0 | 0–0 | 0–0 | 1–0 | 4–3 | 0–0 |
| Blackpool | 1–0 | 1–2 | 2–2 | | 0–0 | 0–1 | 0–1 | 0–1 | 0–3 | 1–3 | 1–1 | 1–0 | 2–3 | 1–1 | 2–2 | 0–2 | 1–0 | 1–1 | 0–2 | 1–0 | 2–0 | 1–0 | 1–0 | 1–2 |
| Bolton Wanderers | 1–0 | 2–2 | 4–0 | 1–0 | | 2–2 | 0–2 | 0–1 | 1–1 | 2–2 | 3–0 | 0–1 | 1–1 | 0–1 | 0–1 | 2–2 | 3–1 | 1–1 | 0–1 | 1–1 | 1–1 | 2–0 | 1–1 | 1–1 |
| Bournemouth | 1–0 | 0–2 | 1–3 | 1–2 | 0–2 | | 1–1 | 1–1 | 2–1 | 0–1 | 5–0 | 2–1 | 1–1 | 4–1 | 0–1 | 0–0 | 5–2 | 4–1 | 2–1 | 3–1 | 2–4 | 1–1 | 1–0 | 3–0 |
| Brighton & Hove Albion | 1–2 | 1–0 | 3–0 | 1–1 | 3–1 | 1–1 | | 2–0 | 3–0 | 1–2 | 1–0 | 0–0 | 0–2 | 1–0 | 3–1 | 0–2 | 1–1 | 1–3 | 2–0 | 1–1 | 1–1 | 1–1 | 1–2 | 2–0 |
| Burnley | 1–0 | 3–0 | 1–1 | 2–1 | 1–1 | 1–1 | 0–0 | | 3–0 | 2–0 | 2–0 | 3–2 | 1–0 | 2–1 | 0–2 | 0–1 | 3–1 | 3–1 | 2–0 | 2–1 | 1–1 | 0–0 | 2–0 | 2–0 |
| Charlton Athletic | 1–2 | 0–2 | 1–3 | 0–0 | 0–0 | 1–0 | 3–2 | 0–3 | | 0–2 | 2–0 | 0–0 | 0–1 | 2–4 | 2–1 | 0–1 | 0–1 | 1–1 | 1–0 | 0–1 | 1–1 | 3–1 | 0–0 | 3–2 |
| Derby County | 2–1 | 1–1 | 1–1 | 5–1 | 0–0 | 1–0 | 1–0 | 0–3 | 3–0 | | 3–1 | 3–1 | 4–4 | 3–1 | 0–1 | 2–1 | 0–1 | 5–0 | 1–0 | 1–3 | 3–0 | 4–2 | 0–1 | 3–2 |
| Doncaster Rovers | 2–2 | 1–3 | 2–0 | 1–3 | 1–2 | 0–1 | 1–3 | 0–2 | 3–0 | 0–2 | | 2–0 | 0–3 | 0–3 | 1–0 | 0–0 | 0–0 | 2–2 | 2–1 | 1–3 | 1–0 | 2–1 | 3–0 | 2–1 |
| Huddersfield Town | 5–0 | 1–3 | 2–4 | 1–1 | 0–1 | 5–1 | 1–1 | 2–1 | 2–1 | 1–1 | 0–0 | | 0–2 | 3–2 | 0–2 | 2–2 | 1–0 | 0–3 | 1–1 | 0–1 | 0–2 | 1–2 | 1–0 | 5–1 |
| Ipswich Town | 1–1 | 1–0 | 3–1 | 0–0 | 1–0 | 2–2 | 2–0 | 0–1 | 1–1 | 2–1 | 2–1 | 2–1 | | 1–2 | 1–2 | 3–1 | 3–0 | 1–1 | 1–3 | 2–0 | 2–1 | 1–1 | 1–3 | 2–1 |
| Leeds United | 0–0 | 4–0 | 1–2 | 2–0 | 1–5 | 2–1 | 2–1 | 1–2 | 0–1 | 1–1 | 1–2 | 5–1 | 1–1 | | 0–1 | 2–1 | 2–1 | 0–2 | 0–1 | 2–4 | 1–1 | 3–3 | 2–0 | 2–0 |
| Leicester City | 2–1 | 3–2 | 2–1 | 3–1 | 5–3 | 2–1 | 1–4 | 1–1 | 3–0 | 4–1 | 1–0 | 2–1 | 3–0 | 0–0 | | 2–0 | 3–0 | 0–2 | 1–0 | 1–0 | 2–1 | 2–2 | 2–0 | 1–1 |
| Middlesbrough | 3–1 | 3–1 | 0–0 | 1–1 | 1–0 | 3–3 | 0–1 | 1–0 | 1–0 | 1–0 | 4–0 | 1–1 | 2–0 | 0–0 | 1–2 | | 1–2 | 1–1 | 1–3 | 3–0 | 1–1 | 2–2 | 0–0 | 4–1 |
| Millwall | 1–0 | 2–3 | 2–2 | 3–1 | 1–1 | 1–0 | 0–1 | 2–2 | 0–0 | 1–5 | 0–0 | 0–1 | 1–0 | 2–0 | 1–3 | 0–2 | | 2–2 | 2–2 | 0–3 | 1–1 | 2–2 | 2–1 | 0–1 |
| Nottingham Forest | 3–2 | 1–0 | 4–1 | 0–1 | 3–0 | 1–1 | 1–2 | 1–1 | 0–1 | 1–0 | 0–0 | 1–0 | 0–0 | 2–1 | 2–2 | 2–2 | 1–2 | | 2–0 | 2–3 | 3–3 | 4–2 | 1–4 | 3–1 |
| Queens Park Rangers | 2–0 | 1–0 | 0–0 | 1–1 | 2–1 | 3–0 | 0–0 | 3–3 | 1–0 | 2–1 | 2–1 | 2–1 | 1–0 | 1–1 | 0–1 | 2–0 | 1–1 | 5–2 | | 1–3 | 2–1 | 2–1 | 1–0 | 3–0 |
| Reading | 1–3 | 2–0 | 0–1 | 5–1 | 7–1 | 1–2 | 0–0 | 2–2 | 1–0 | 0–0 | 4–1 | 1–1 | 2–1 | 1–0 | 1–1 | 2–0 | 1–1 | 1–1 | 1–1 | | 0–2 | 3–3 | 1–2 | 1–1 |
| Sheffield Wednesday | 1–0 | 4–1 | 3–3 | 2–0 | 1–3 | 1–2 | 1–0 | 1–2 | 2–3 | 0–1 | 0–1 | 1–2 | 1–1 | 6–0 | 2–1 | 1–0 | 2–2 | 0–1 | 3–0 | 5–2 | | 1–4 | 0–3 | 1–1 |
| Watford | 3–0 | 1–0 | 3–3 | 4–0 | 0–1 | 6–1 | 2–0 | 1–1 | 1–1 | 2–3 | 2–1 | 1–4 | 3–1 | 3–0 | 0–3 | 1–0 | 4–0 | 1–1 | 0–0 | 0–1 | 0–1 | | 1–0 | 0–3 |
| Wigan Athletic | 2–0 | 0–0 | 2–1 | 0–2 | 3–2 | 3–0 | 0–1 | 0–0 | 2–1 | 1–3 | 2–2 | 2–1 | 2–0 | 1–0 | 2–2 | 2–2 | 0–1 | 2–1 | 0–0 | 3–0 | 1–0 | 2–1 | | 3–3 |
| Yeovil Town | 1–4 | 0–1 | 0–1 | 1–0 | 2–2 | 1–1 | 0–0 | 1–2 | 2–2 | 0–3 | 1–0 | 1–2 | 0–1 | 1–2 | 1–2 | 1–4 | 1–1 | 3–1 | 0–1 | 0–1 | 2–0 | 0–0 | 0–1 | |

Updated to match(es) played on 3 May 2014. Source: http://www.football-league.co.uk/page/ResultsSearch/0,,10794~201300007,00.html
Legend: Blue = home team win; Yellow = draw; Red = away team win.

== League One ==
=== Table ===
| Pos | Team | Pld | W | D | L | GF | GA | GD | Pts | Promotion, qualification or relegation |
|---|---|---|---|---|---|---|---|---|---|---|
| 1 | Wolverhampton Wanderers (C, P) | 46 | 31 | 10 | 5 | 89 | 31 | +58 | 103 | Promotion to Football League Championship |
| 2 | Brentford (P) | 46 | 28 | 10 | 8 | 72 | 43 | +29 | 94 | Promotion to Football League Championship |
| 3 | Leyton Orient | 46 | 25 | 11 | 10 | 85 | 45 | +40 | 86 | Qualification for League One play-offs (Note: Four teams play for one spot and promotion to Football League Championship.) |
| 4 | Rotherham United (O, P) | 46 | 24 | 14 | 8 | 86 | 58 | +28 | 86 | Qualification for League One play-offs |
| 5 | Preston North End | 46 | 23 | 16 | 7 | 72 | 46 | +26 | 85 | Qualification for League One play-offs |
| 6 | Peterborough United | 46 | 23 | 5 | 18 | 72 | 58 | +14 | 74 | Qualification for League One play-offs |
| 7 | Sheffield United | 46 | 18 | 13 | 15 | 48 | 47 | +1 | 67 | |
| 8 | Swindon Town | 46 | 19 | 9 | 18 | 63 | 59 | +4 | 66 | |
| 9 | Port Vale | 46 | 18 | 7 | 21 | 59 | 73 | −14 | 61 | |
| 10 | Milton Keynes Dons | 46 | 17 | 9 | 20 | 63 | 65 | −2 | 60 | |
| 11 | Bradford City | 46 | 14 | 17 | 15 | 57 | 54 | +3 | 59 | |
| 12 | Bristol City | 46 | 13 | 19 | 14 | 70 | 67 | +3 | 58 | |
| 13 | Walsall | 46 | 14 | 16 | 16 | 49 | 49 | 0 | 58 | |
| 14 | Crawley Town | 46 | 14 | 15 | 17 | 48 | 54 | −6 | 57 | |
| 15 | Oldham Athletic | 46 | 14 | 14 | 18 | 50 | 59 | −9 | 56 | |
| 16 | Colchester United | 46 | 13 | 14 | 19 | 53 | 61 | −8 | 53 | |
| 17 | Gillingham | 46 | 15 | 8 | 23 | 60 | 79 | −19 | 53 | |
| 18 | Coventry City | 46 | 16 | 13 | 17 | 74 | 77 | −3 | 51 (Note: On 2 August Coventry City were deducted 10 points for exiting administration without a CVA.) | |
| 19 | Crewe Alexandra | 46 | 13 | 12 | 21 | 54 | 80 | −26 | 51 | |
| 20 | Notts County | 46 | 15 | 5 | 26 | 64 | 77 | −13 | 50 | |
| 21 | Tranmere Rovers (R) | 46 | 12 | 11 | 23 | 52 | 79 | −27 | 47 | Relegation to Football League Two |
| 22 | Carlisle United (R) | 46 | 11 | 12 | 23 | 43 | 76 | −33 | 45 | Relegation to Football League Two |
| 23 | Shrewsbury Town (R) | 46 | 9 | 15 | 22 | 44 | 65 | −21 | 42 | Relegation to Football League Two |
| 24 | Stevenage (R) | 46 | 11 | 9 | 26 | 46 | 72 | −26 | 42 | Relegation to Football League Two |

Updated to match(es) played on 3 May 2014. Source: BBC Sport
Rules for classification: 1) Points; 2) Goal difference; 3) Number of goals scored
(C) Champions; (O) Play-off winners; (P) Promoted; (R) Relegated

=== Play-offs ===
Semifinals
3 | Leyton Orient | 1 | 2 | 3
6 | Peterborough United | 1 | 1 | 2
4 | Rotherham United | 1 | 3 | 4
5 | Preston North End | 1 | 1 | 2

Final
3 | Leyton Orient | 2 (3)
4 | Rotherham United (p) | 2 (4)

=== Results ===
| Home \ Away | BRA | BRE | BRI | CRL | COL | COV | CRA | CRE | GIL | LEY | MKD | NTC | OLD | PET | PTV | PNE | ROT | SHU | SHR | STE | SWI | TRA | WAL | WOL |
|---|---|---|---|---|---|---|---|---|---|---|---|---|---|---|---|---|---|---|---|---|---|---|---|---|
| Bradford City | | 4–0 | 1–1 | 4–0 | 2–2 | 3–3 | 2–1 | 3–3 | 1–1 | 1–1 | 1–0 | 1–1 | 2–3 | 1–0 | 1–0 | 0–0 | 0–1 | 2–0 | 2–1 | 2–3 | 1–1 | 0–1 | 0–2 | 1–2 |
| Brentford | 2–0 | | 3–1 | 0–0 | 3–1 | 3–1 | 1–0 | 5–0 | 2–1 | 0–2 | 3–1 | 3–1 | 1–0 | 3–2 | 2–0 | 1–0 | 0–1 | 3–1 | 1–0 | 2–0 | 3–2 | 2–0 | 1–0 | 0–3 |
| Bristol City | 2–2 | 1–2 | | 2–1 | 1–1 | 1–2 | 2–0 | 0–0 | 2–1 | 2–2 | 2–2 | 2–1 | 1–1 | 0–3 | 5–0 | 1–1 | 1–2 | 0–1 | 1–1 | 4–1 | 0–0 | 2–2 | 1–0 | 1–2 |
| Carlisle United | 1–0 | 0–0 | 2–4 | | 2–4 | 0–4 | 1–1 | 2–1 | 1–2 | 1–5 | 3–0 | 2–1 | 0–1 | 2–1 | 0–1 | 0–1 | 1–2 | 1–0 | 0–0 | 0–0 | 1–0 | 4–1 | 1–1 | 2–2 |
| Colchester United | 0–2 | 4–1 | 2–2 | 1–1 | | 2–1 | 1–1 | 1–2 | 3–0 | 1–2 | 3–1 | 0–4 | 0–1 | 1–0 | 1–0 | 1–2 | 0–0 | 0–1 | 1–0 | 4–0 | 1–2 | 1–2 | 1–1 | 0–3 |
| Coventry City | 0–0 | 0–2 | 5–4 | 1–2 | 2–0 | | 2–2 | 2–2 | 2–1 | 3–1 | 1–2 | 3–0 | 1–1 | 4–2 | 2–2 | 4–4 | 0–3 | 3–2 | 0–0 | 1–0 | 1–2 | 1–5 | 2–1 | 1–1 |
| Crawley Town | 1–0 | 0–1 | 1–1 | 0–0 | 1–0 | 3–2 | | 1–2 | 3–2 | 2–1 | 0–2 | 1–0 | 1–0 | 1–0 | 0–3 | 2–2 | 1–2 | 0–2 | 1–1 | 1–1 | 0–0 | 2–0 | 0–0 | 2–1 |
| Crewe Alexandra | 0–0 | 1–3 | 1–0 | 2–1 | 0–0 | 1–2 | 1–0 | | 0–3 | 1–2 | 2–0 | 1–3 | 1–1 | 2–2 | 1–2 | 2–1 | 3–3 | 3–0 | 1–1 | 0–3 | 1–1 | 2–1 | 0–3 | 0–2 |
| Gillingham | 0–1 | 1–1 | 1–1 | 1–0 | 0–1 | 4–2 | 1–0 | 1–3 | | 1–2 | 3–2 | 2–1 | 0–1 | 2–2 | 3–2 | 1–2 | 3–4 | 0–1 | 1–1 | 3–2 | 2–0 | 2–0 | 2–2 | 1–0 |
| Leyton Orient | 0–1 | 0–1 | 1–3 | 4–0 | 2–1 | 2–0 | 2–3 | 2–0 | 5–1 | | 2–1 | 5–1 | 1–1 | 1–2 | 3–2 | 0–1 | 1–0 | 1–1 | 3–0 | 2–0 | 2–0 | 2–0 | 1–1 | 1–3 |
| Milton Keynes Dons | 2–3 | 2–2 | 2–2 | 0–1 | 0–0 | 1–3 | 0–2 | 1–0 | 0–1 | 1–3 | | 3–1 | 2–1 | 0–2 | 3–0 | 0–0 | 3–2 | 0–1 | 3–2 | 4–1 | 1–1 | 0–1 | 1–0 | 0–1 |
| Notts County | 3–0 | 0–1 | 1–1 | 4–1 | 2–0 | 3–0 | 1–0 | 4–0 | 3–1 | 0–0 | 1–3 | | 3–2 | 2–4 | 4–2 | 0–1 | 0–1 | 2–1 | 2–3 | 0–1 | 2–0 | 2–0 | 1–5 | 0–1 |
| Oldham Athletic | 1–1 | 0–0 | 1–1 | 1–0 | 0–2 | 0–0 | 1–0 | 1–1 | 1–0 | 1–1 | 1–2 | 1–1 | | 5–4 | 3–1 | 1–3 | 0–2 | 1–1 | 1–2 | 1–0 | 2–1 | 0–1 | 0–1 | 0–3 |
| Peterborough United | 2–1 | 1–3 | 1–2 | 4–1 | 2–0 | 1–0 | 0–2 | 4–2 | 2–0 | 1–3 | 2–1 | 4–3 | 2–1 | | 0–0 | 2–0 | 0–1 | 0–0 | 1–0 | 0–1 | 1–0 | 3–0 | 0–0 | 1–0 |
| Port Vale | 2–1 | 1–1 | 1–1 | 2–1 | 2–0 | 3–2 | 2–1 | 1–3 | 2–1 | 0–2 | 1–0 | 2–1 | 1–0 | 0–1 | | 0–2 | 2–0 | 1–2 | 3–1 | 2–2 | 2–3 | 3–2 | 1–0 | 1–3 |
| Preston North End | 2–2 | 0–3 | 1–0 | 6–1 | 1–1 | 1–1 | 1–0 | 0–2 | 3–1 | 1–1 | 2–2 | 2–0 | 2–1 | 3–1 | 3–2 | | 3–3 | 0–0 | 5–2 | 3–0 | 2–1 | 1–1 | 2–1 | 0–0 |
| Rotherham United | 0–0 | 3–0 | 2–1 | 0–0 | 2–2 | 1–3 | 2–2 | 4–2 | 4–1 | 2–1 | 2–2 | 6–0 | 3–2 | 0–1 | 1–0 | 0–0 | | 3–1 | 2–2 | 2–1 | 0–4 | 1–1 | 1–1 | 3–3 |
| Sheffield United | 2–2 | 0–0 | 3–0 | 1–0 | 1–1 | 2–1 | 1–1 | 3–1 | 1–2 | 1–1 | 0–1 | 2–1 | 1–1 | 2–0 | 2–1 | 0–1 | 1–0 | | 2–0 | 1–0 | 1–0 | 3–1 | 1–1 | 0–2 |
| Shrewsbury Town | 2–1 | 1–1 | 2–3 | 2–2 | 1–1 | 1–1 | 1–1 | 1–3 | 2–0 | 0–2 | 0–0 | 1–0 | 1–2 | 2–4 | 0–0 | 0–1 | 0–3 | 2–0 | | 1–0 | 2–0 | 0–1 | 0–1 | 0–1 |
| Stevenage | 1–1 | 2–1 | 1–3 | 1–3 | 2–3 | 0–1 | 2–0 | 1–0 | 3–1 | 0–1 | 2–3 | 0–1 | 3–4 | 0–1 | 1–1 | 1–1 | 0–3 | 0–0 | 1–3 | | 2–0 | 3–1 | 3–2 | 0–0 |
| Swindon Town | 1–0 | 1–0 | 3–2 | 3–1 | 0–0 | 2–1 | 1–1 | 5–0 | 2–2 | 1–3 | 1–2 | 2–0 | 0–1 | 2–1 | 5–2 | 1–0 | 1–2 | 2–1 | 3–1 | 1–0 | | 1–0 | 1–3 | 1–4 |
| Tranmere Rovers | 1–2 | 3–4 | 1–1 | 0–0 | 2–1 | 3–1 | 3–3 | 1–0 | 1–2 | 0–4 | 3–2 | 3–2 | 2–2 | 0–5 | 0–1 | 1–2 | 1–2 | 0–0 | 2–1 | 0–0 | 1–2 | | 1–1 | 1–1 |
| Walsall | 0–2 | 1–1 | 0–1 | 2–0 | 0–1 | 0–1 | 1–2 | 1–1 | 1–1 | 1–1 | 0–3 | 1–1 | 1–0 | 2–0 | 0–2 | 0–3 | 1–1 | 2–1 | 1–0 | 2–1 | 1–1 | 3–1 | | 0–3 |
| Wolverhampton Wanderers | 2–0 | 0–0 | 3–1 | 3–0 | 4–2 | 1–1 | 2–1 | 2–0 | 4–0 | 1–1 | 0–2 | 2–0 | 2–0 | 2–0 | 3–0 | 2–0 | 6–4 | 2–0 | 0–0 | 2–0 | 3–2 | 2–0 | 0–1 | |

Updated to match(es) played on 3 May 2014. Source: http://www.football-league.co.uk/page/ResultsSearch/0,,10794~2013000025,00.html
Legend: Blue = home team win; Yellow = draw; Red = away team win.

== League Two ==
=== Table ===
| Pos | Team | Pld | W | D | L | GF | GA | GD | Pts | Promotion, qualification or relegation |
|---|---|---|---|---|---|---|---|---|---|---|
| 1 | Chesterfield (C, P) | 46 | 23 | 15 | 8 | 71 | 40 | +31 | 84 | Promotion to Football League One |
| 2 | Scunthorpe United (P) | 46 | 20 | 21 | 5 | 68 | 44 | +24 | 81 | Promotion to Football League One |
| 3 | Rochdale (P) | 46 | 24 | 9 | 13 | 69 | 48 | +21 | 81 | Promotion to Football League One |
| 4 | Fleetwood Town (O, P) | 46 | 22 | 10 | 14 | 66 | 52 | +14 | 76 | Qualification for League Two play-offs |
| 5 | Southend United | 46 | 19 | 15 | 12 | 56 | 39 | +17 | 72 | Qualification for League Two play-offs |
| 6 | Burton Albion | 46 | 19 | 15 | 12 | 47 | 42 | +5 | 72 | Qualification for League Two play-offs |
| 7 | York City | 46 | 18 | 17 | 11 | 52 | 41 | +11 | 71 | Qualification for League Two play-offs |
| 8 | Oxford United | 46 | 16 | 14 | 16 | 53 | 50 | +3 | 62 | |
| 9 | Dagenham & Redbridge | 46 | 15 | 15 | 16 | 53 | 59 | −6 | 60 | |
| 10 | Plymouth Argyle | 46 | 16 | 12 | 18 | 51 | 58 | −7 | 60 | |
| 11 | Mansfield Town | 46 | 15 | 15 | 16 | 49 | 58 | −9 | 60 | |
| 12 | Bury | 46 | 13 | 20 | 13 | 59 | 51 | +8 | 59 | |
| 13 | Portsmouth | 46 | 14 | 17 | 15 | 56 | 66 | −10 | 59 | |
| 14 | Newport County | 46 | 14 | 16 | 16 | 56 | 59 | −3 | 58 | |
| 15 | Accrington Stanley | 46 | 14 | 15 | 17 | 54 | 56 | −2 | 57 | |
| 16 | Exeter City | 46 | 14 | 13 | 19 | 54 | 57 | −3 | 55 | |
| 17 | Cheltenham Town | 46 | 13 | 16 | 17 | 53 | 63 | −10 | 55 | |
| 18 | Morecambe | 46 | 13 | 15 | 18 | 52 | 64 | −12 | 54 | |
| 19 | Hartlepool United | 46 | 14 | 11 | 21 | 50 | 56 | −6 | 53 | |
| 20 | AFC Wimbledon | 46 | 14 | 14 | 18 | 49 | 57 | −8 | 53 (Note: On 28 April AFC Wimbledon were deducted 3 points for fielding an ineligible player.) | |
| 21 | Northampton Town | 46 | 13 | 14 | 19 | 42 | 57 | −15 | 53 | |
| 22 | Wycombe Wanderers | 46 | 12 | 14 | 20 | 46 | 54 | −8 | 50 | |
| 23 | Bristol Rovers (R) | 46 | 12 | 14 | 20 | 43 | 54 | −11 | 50 | Relegation to the Conference Premier |
| 24 | Torquay United (R) | 46 | 12 | 9 | 25 | 42 | 66 | −24 | 45 | Relegation to the Conference Premier |

Updated to match(es) played on 3 May 2014. Source: BBC Sport
Rules for classification: 1) Points; 2) Goal difference; 3) Number of goals scored
(C) Champions; (O) Play-off winners; (P) Promoted; (R) Relegated

=== Play-offs ===
Semifinals
4 | Fleetwood Town | 1 | 0 | 1
7 | York City | 0 | 0 | 0
5 | Southend United | 0 | 2 | 2
6 | Burton Albion | 1 | 2 | 3

Final
4 | Fleetwood Town | 1
6 | Burton Albion | 0

=== Results ===
| Home \ Away | ACC | WIM | BRR | BRT | BRY | CHL | CHF | D&R | EXE | FLE | HAR | MAN | MOR | NPC | NOR | OXF | PLY | POR | ROC | SCU | STD | TOR | WYC | YOR |
|---|---|---|---|---|---|---|---|---|---|---|---|---|---|---|---|---|---|---|---|---|---|---|---|---|
| Accrington Stanley | | 3–2 | 2–1 | 0–1 | 0–0 | 0–1 | 3–1 | 1–2 | 2–3 | 2–0 | 0–0 | 1–1 | 5–1 | 3–3 | 0–1 | 0–0 | 1–1 | 2–2 | 1–2 | 2–3 | 1–1 | 2–1 | 1–1 | 1–1 |
| AFC Wimbledon | 1–1 | | 0–0 | 3–1 | 0–1 | 4–3 | 1–1 | 1–1 | 2–1 | 2–0 | 2–1 | 0–0 | 0–3 | 2–2 | 0–2 | 0–2 | 1–1 | 4–0 | 0–3 | 3–2 | 0–1 | 0–2 | 1–0 | 0–1 |
| Bristol Rovers | 0–1 | 3–0 | | 2–0 | 1–1 | 1–0 | 0–0 | 1–2 | 2–1 | 1–3 | 2–2 | 0–1 | 1–0 | 3–1 | 1–0 | 1–1 | 2–1 | 2–0 | 1–2 | 0–0 | 0–0 | 1–2 | 0–1 | 3–2 |
| Burton Albion | 2–1 | 1–1 | 1–0 | | 2–2 | 2–1 | 0–2 | 1–1 | 1–1 | 2–4 | 3–0 | 1–0 | 0–1 | 1–0 | 1–0 | 0–2 | 1–0 | 1–2 | 1–0 | 2–2 | 0–1 | 2–0 | 1–0 | 1–1 |
| Bury | 3–0 | 1–1 | 2–1 | 0–0 | | 4–1 | 0–2 | 1–1 | 2–0 | 2–2 | 1–0 | 0–0 | 0–2 | 0–0 | 1–1 | 1–1 | 4–0 | 4–4 | 0–0 | 2–2 | 1–1 | 1–3 | 1–0 | 2–1 |
| Cheltenham Town | 1–2 | 1–0 | 0–0 | 2–2 | 2–1 | | 1–4 | 2–3 | 1–0 | 1–2 | 2–2 | 1–2 | 3–0 | 0–0 | 1–1 | 2–2 | 1–3 | 2–2 | 1–2 | 0–2 | 1–2 | 1–0 | 1–1 | 2–2 |
| Chesterfield | 1–0 | 2–0 | 3–1 | 0–2 | 4–0 | 2–0 | | 1–1 | 1–1 | 2–1 | 1–1 | 0–1 | 1–0 | 1–1 | 0–0 | 3–0 | 2–0 | 0–0 | 2–2 | 1–1 | 2–1 | 3–1 | 2–0 | 2–2 |
| Dagenham & Redbridge | 0–0 | 1–0 | 2–0 | 2–0 | 2–1 | 1–2 | 0–1 | | 1–1 | 0–1 | 0–2 | 0–0 | 1–1 | 1–1 | 0–3 | 1–0 | 1–2 | 1–4 | 3–1 | 3–3 | 1–1 | 0–1 | 2–0 | 2–0 |
| Exeter City | 0–1 | 2–0 | 2–1 | 0–1 | 2–2 | 1–1 | 0–2 | 2–2 | | 3–0 | 0–3 | 0–1 | 1–1 | 0–2 | 0–1 | 0–0 | 3–1 | 1–1 | 0–1 | 2–0 | 0–2 | 1–2 | 0–1 | 2–1 |
| Fleetwood Town | 3–1 | 0–0 | 3–1 | 2–3 | 2–1 | 0–2 | 1–1 | 3–1 | 1–2 | | 2–0 | 5–4 | 2–2 | 4–1 | 2–0 | 1–1 | 0–4 | 3–1 | 0–0 | 0–1 | 1–1 | 4–1 | 1–0 | 1–2 |
| Hartlepool United | 2–1 | 3–1 | 4–0 | 1–1 | 0–3 | 0–1 | 1–2 | 2–1 | 0–2 | 0–1 | | 2–4 | 2–1 | 3–0 | 2–0 | 1–3 | 1–0 | 0–0 | 0–3 | 0–0 | 0–1 | 3–0 | 1–2 | 2–0 |
| Mansfield Town | 2–3 | 1–0 | 1–1 | 0–0 | 1–4 | 0–2 | 0–0 | 3–0 | 0–0 | 1–0 | 1–4 | | 1–2 | 2–1 | 3–0 | 1–3 | 0–1 | 2–2 | 3–0 | 0–2 | 2–1 | 1–3 | 2–2 | 0–1 |
| Morecambe | 1–2 | 1–1 | 2–1 | 0–1 | 0–0 | 0–1 | 4–3 | 2–2 | 2–0 | 1–0 | 1–2 | 0–1 | | 4–1 | 1–1 | 1–1 | 2–1 | 2–2 | 1–2 | 1–1 | 2–1 | 1–1 | 1–1 | 0–0 |
| Newport County | 4–1 | 1–2 | 1–0 | 1–1 | 0–0 | 0–1 | 3–2 | 1–2 | 1–1 | 0–0 | 2–0 | 1–1 | 2–3 | | 1–2 | 3–2 | 1–2 | 1–2 | 2–1 | 2–2 | 3–1 | 2–1 | 2–0 | 3–0 |
| Northampton Town | 1–0 | 2–2 | 0–0 | 1–0 | 0–3 | 1–1 | 1–3 | 2–2 | 1–2 | 1–0 | 2–0 | 1–1 | 0–0 | 3–1 | | 3–1 | 0–2 | 0–1 | 0–3 | 1–1 | 2–1 | 1–2 | 1–4 | 0–2 |
| Oxford United | 1–2 | 2–1 | 0–1 | 1–2 | 2–1 | 1–1 | 0–1 | 2–1 | 0–0 | 0–2 | 1–0 | 3–0 | 3–0 | 0–0 | 2–0 | | 2–3 | 0–0 | 1–1 | 0–2 | 0–2 | 1–0 | 2–2 | 0–1 |
| Plymouth Argyle | 0–0 | 1–2 | 1–0 | 0–1 | 2–1 | 1–1 | 2–1 | 2–1 | 1–2 | 0–2 | 1–1 | 1–1 | 5–0 | 0–0 | 1–0 | 0–2 | | 1–1 | 1–0 | 0–2 | 1–1 | 2–0 | 0–3 | 0–4 |
| Portsmouth | 1–0 | 1–0 | 3–2 | 0–0 | 1–0 | 0–0 | 0–2 | 1–0 | 3–2 | 0–1 | 1–0 | 1–1 | 3–0 | 0–2 | 0–0 | 1–4 | 3–3 | | 3–0 | 1–2 | 1–2 | 0–1 | 2–2 | 0–1 |
| Rochdale | 2–1 | 1–2 | 2–0 | 1–1 | 1–0 | 2–0 | 2–2 | 0–1 | 3–1 | 1–2 | 3–0 | 3–0 | 2–1 | 3–0 | 3–2 | 3–0 | 3–0 | 3–0 | | 0–4 | 0–3 | 1–0 | 3–2 | 0–0 |
| Scunthorpe United | 0–2 | 0–0 | 1–1 | 1–0 | 2–2 | 2–0 | 1–1 | 1–1 | 0–4 | 0–0 | 1–0 | 2–0 | 2–0 | 1–1 | 1–1 | 1–0 | 1–0 | 5–1 | 3–0 | | 2–2 | 3–1 | 0–0 | 2–2 |
| Southend United | 1–0 | 0–1 | 1–1 | 1–0 | 0–0 | 1–1 | 3–0 | 0–1 | 2–3 | 2–0 | 1–1 | 3–0 | 1–3 | 0–0 | 2–0 | 3–0 | 1–0 | 2–1 | 1–1 | 0–1 | | 1–0 | 1–1 | 2–1 |
| Torquay United | 0–1 | 1–1 | 1–1 | 1–1 | 2–1 | 4–2 | 0–2 | 0–1 | 1–3 | 0–1 | 0–0 | 0–0 | 1–1 | 0–1 | 1–2 | 1–3 | 1–1 | 1–1 | 2–1 | 0–1 | 1–0 | | 0–3 | 0–3 |
| Wycombe Wanderers | 0–0 | 0–3 | 1–2 | 1–2 | 1–2 | 1–2 | 1–0 | 2–0 | 1–1 | 1–1 | 2–1 | 0–1 | 1–0 | 0–1 | 1–1 | 0–1 | 0–1 | 0–1 | 0–2 | 1–1 | 2–1 | 3–2 | | 1–1 |
| York City | 1–1 | 0–2 | 0–0 | 0–0 | 1–0 | 0–0 | 0–2 | 3–1 | 2–1 | 0–2 | 0–0 | 1–2 | 1–0 | 1–0 | 1–0 | 0–0 | 1–1 | 4–2 | 0–0 | 4–1 | 0–0 | 1–0 | 2–0 | |

Updated to match(es) played on 3 May 2014. Source:
Legend: Blue = home team win; Yellow = draw; Red = away team win.

== Managerial changes ==
| Team | Outgoing manager | Manner of departure | Date of vacancy | Position in table at time of departure | Incoming manager | Date of appointment | Position in table at time of appointment |
|---|---|---|---|---|---|---|---|
| Dagenham & Redbridge | John Still | Signed by Luton Town | 26 February 2013 | 2012–13 season | Wayne Burnett | 2 May 2013 | Pre-season |
| Blackburn Rovers | Michael Appleton | Sacked | 19 March 2013 | 2012–13 season | Gary Bowyer | 24 May 2013 | Pre-season |
| Sheffield United | Danny Wilson | Sacked | 10 April 2013 | 2012–13 season | David Weir | 10 June 2013 | Pre-season |
| Torquay United | Martin Ling | Sacked | 29 April 2013 | Pre-season | Alan Knill | 7 May 2013 | Pre-season |
| Accrington Stanley | Leam Richardson | Signed by Chesterfield | 30 April 2013 | Pre-season | James Beattie | 13 May 2013 | Pre-season |
| Doncaster Rovers | Brian Flynn | Appointed as Director of Football | 3 May 2013 | Pre-season | Paul Dickov | 20 May 2013 | Pre-season |
| Wolverhampton Wanderers | Dean Saunders | Sacked | 7 May 2013 | Pre-season | Kenny Jackett | 31 May 2013 | Pre-season |
| Millwall | Kenny Jackett | Resigned | 7 May 2013 | Pre-season | Steve Lomas | 6 June 2013 | Pre-season |
| Hartlepool United | John Hughes | Sacked | 9 May 2013 | Pre-season | Colin Cooper | 24 May 2013 | Pre-season |
| Brighton & Hove Albion | Gus Poyet | Sacked | 23 June 2013 | Pre-season | Óscar García Junyent | 26 June 2013 | Pre-season |
| Swindon Town | Kevin MacDonald | Mutual consent | 13 July 2013 | Pre-season | Mark Cooper | 20 August 2013 | 17th |
| Carlisle United | Greg Abbott | Sacked | 9 September 2013 | 22nd | Graham Kavanagh | 30 September 2013 | 14th |
| Derby County | Nigel Clough | Sacked | 28 September 2013 | 14th | Steve McClaren | 30 September 2013 | 14th |
| Sheffield United | David Weir | Sacked | 11 October 2013 | 22nd | Nigel Clough | 23 October 2013 | 21st |
| Gillingham | Martin Allen | Sacked | 13 October 2013 | 16th | Peter Taylor | 11 November 2013 | 18th |
| Bury | Kevin Blackwell | Sacked | 14 October 2013 | 21st | David Flitcroft | 9 December 2013 | 20th |
| Middlesbrough | Tony Mowbray | Resigned | 21 October 2013 | 16th | Aitor Karanka | 13 November 2013 | 16th |
| Notts County | Chris Kiwomya | Mutual Consent | 27 October 2013 | 24th | Shaun Derry | 6 November 2013 | 24th |
| Scunthorpe United | Brian Laws | Sacked | 20 November 2013 | 12th | Russ Wilcox | 24 December 2013 | 3rd |
| Portsmouth | Guy Whittingham | Sacked | 25 November 2013 | 18th | Richie Barker | 9 December 2013 | 17th |
| Crawley Town | Richie Barker | Sacked | 27 November 2013 | 12th | John Gregory | 3 December 2013 | 15th |
| Bristol City | Sean O'Driscoll | Sacked | 28 November 2013 | 22nd | Steve Cotterill | 3 December 2013 | 23rd |
| Barnsley | David Flitcroft | Sacked | 30 November 2013 | 24th | Danny Wilson | 17 December 2013 | 24th |
| Sheffield Wednesday | Dave Jones | Sacked | 1 December 2013 | 23rd | Stuart Gray | 25 January 2014 | 19th |
| Wigan Athletic | Owen Coyle | Sacked | 2 December 2013 | 14th | Uwe Rösler | 7 December 2013 | 14th |
| Brentford | Uwe Rösler | Signed by Wigan Athletic | 7 December 2013 | 4th | Mark Warburton | 10 December 2013 | 4th |
| Watford | Gianfranco Zola | Resigned | 16 December 2013 | 13th | Giuseppe Sannino | 18 December 2013 | 13th |
| Northampton Town | Aidy Boothroyd | Sacked | 21 December 2013 | 24th | Chris Wilder | 27 January 2014 | 24th |
| Millwall | Steve Lomas | Sacked | 26 December 2013 | 20th | Ian Holloway | 7 January 2014 | 21st |
| Torquay United | Alan Knill | Sacked | 2 January 2014 | 23rd | Chris Hargreaves | 6 January 2014 | 23rd |
| Blackpool | Paul Ince | Sacked | 21 January 2014 | 14th | Barry Ferguson | 4 March 2014 | 20th |
| Shrewsbury Town | Graham Turner | Resigned | 21 January 2014 | 20th | Michael Jackson | 21 February 2014 | 23rd |
| Oxford United | Chris Wilder | Resigned | 25 January 2014 | 6th | Gary Waddock | 22 March 2014 | 6th |
| Charlton Athletic | Chris Powell | Sacked | 11 March 2014 | 24th | José Riga | 11 March 2014 | 24th |
| Nottingham Forest | Billy Davies | Sacked | 24 March 2014 | 7th | Stuart Pearce | 3 April 2014 | 2014–15 season |
| Portsmouth | Richie Barker | Sacked | 27 March 2014 | 22nd | Andy Awford | 1 May 2014 | 11th |
| Bristol Rovers | John Ward | Appointed as Director of Football | 28 March 2014 | 20th | Darrell Clarke | 28 March 2014 | 20th |
| Tranmere Rovers | Ronnie Moore | Sacked | 9 April 2014 | 19th | Robert Edwards | 27 May 2014 | 2014–15 season |
