= 2012–13 Football League =

114th season of the Football League

The Football League
- Season: 2012–13
- Champions: Cardiff City
- Promoted: Cardiff City; Hull City; Crystal Palace
- Relegated: Barnet; Aldershot Town
- New clubs in league: Fleetwood Town; York City

The 2012–13 Football League (known as the npower Football League for sponsorship reasons) was the 114th season of the Football League. It began in August 2012 and concluded in May 2013, with the promotion play-off finals. The Football League is contested through three Divisions: the Championship, League One and League Two. The winner and the runner-up of the League Championship are automatically promoted to the Premier League and they will are joined by the winner of the Championship play-off. The bottom two teams in League Two are relegated to the Conference Premier.

== Promotion and relegation ==
=== From Premier League ===
Relegated to Championship

- Bolton Wanderers
- Blackburn Rovers
- Wolverhampton Wanderers

=== From Championship ===
Promoted to Premier League

- Reading
- Southampton
- West Ham United

Relegated to League One

- Portsmouth
- Coventry City
- Doncaster Rovers

=== From League One ===
Promoted to Championship

- Charlton Athletic
- Sheffield Wednesday
- Huddersfield Town

Relegated to League Two

- Wycombe Wanderers
- Chesterfield
- Exeter City
- Rochdale

=== From League Two ===
Promoted to League One

- Swindon Town
- Shrewsbury Town
- Crawley Town
- Crewe Alexandra

Relegated to Conference Premier

- Hereford United
- Macclesfield Town

=== From Conference Premier ===
Promoted to League Two

- Fleetwood Town
- York City

== Championship ==
=== Table ===
Pos	Team	Pld	W	D	L	GF	GA	GD	Pts	Promotion or relegation
1	Cardiff City (C, P)	46	25	12	9	72	45	+27	87	Promotion to the Premier League
2	Hull City (P)	46	24	7	15	61	52	+9	79	Promotion to the Premier League
3	Watford	46	23	8	15	85	58	+27	77	Qualification for Championship play-offs
4	Brighton & Hove Albion	46	19	18	9	69	43	+26	75	Qualification for Championship play-offs
5	Crystal Palace (O, P)	46	19	15	12	73	62	+11	72	Qualification for Championship play-offs
6	Leicester City	46	19	11	16	71	48	+23	68	Qualification for Championship play-offs
7	Bolton Wanderers	46	18	14	14	69	61	+8	68	
8	Nottingham Forest	46	17	16	13	63	59	+4	67	
9	Charlton Athletic	46	17	14	15	65	59	+6	65	
10	Derby County	46	16	13	17	65	62	+3	61	
11	Burnley	46	16	13	17	62	60	+2	61	
12	Birmingham City	46	15	16	15	63	69	−6	61	
13	Leeds United	46	17	10	19	57	66	−9	61	
14	Ipswich Town	46	16	12	18	48	61	−13	60	
15	Blackpool	46	14	17	15	62	63	−1	59	
16	Middlesbrough	46	18	5	23	61	70	−9	59	
17	Blackburn Rovers	46	14	16	16	55	62	−7	58	
18	Sheffield Wednesday	46	16	10	20	53	61	−8	58	
19	Huddersfield Town	46	15	13	18	53	73	−20	58	
20	Millwall	46	15	11	20	51	62	−11	56	
21	Barnsley	46	14	13	19	56	70	−14	55	
22	Peterborough United (R)	46	15	9	22	66	75	−9	54	Relegation to Football League One
23	Wolverhampton Wanderers (R)	46	14	9	23	55	69	−14	51	Relegation to Football League One
24	Bristol City (R)	46	11	8	27	59	84	−25	41	Relegation to Football League One

Updated to match(es) played on 4 May 2013. Source: BBC Sport
Rules for classification: 1) points; 2) goal difference; 3) number of goals scored.
(C) Champions; (O) Play-off winners; (P) Promoted; (R) Relegated

=== Play-offs ===
Semifinals
3	Watford	0	3	3
6	Leicester City	1	1	2
4	Brighton & Hove Albion	0	0	0
5	Crystal Palace	0	2	2

Final
3	Watford	0
5	Crystal Palace (a.e.t.)	1

=== Results ===
Home \ Away	BAR	BIR	BLB	BLP	BOL	B&HA	BRI	BUR	CAR	CHA	CRY	DER	HUD	HUL	IPS	LEE	LEI	MID	MIL	NOT	PET	SHW	WAT	WOL
Barnsley		1–2	1–3	1–1	2–3	2–1	1–0	1–1	1–2	0–6	1–1	1–1	0–1	2–0	1–1	2–0	2–0	1–0	2–0	1–4	0–2	0–1	1–0	2–1
Birmingham City	0–5		1–1	1–1	2–1	2–2	2–0	2–2	0–1	1–1	2–2	3–1	0–1	2–3	0–1	1–0	1–1	3–2	1–1	2–1	1–0	0–0	0–4	2–3
Blackburn Rovers	2–1	1–1		1–1	1–2	1–1	2–0	1–1	1–4	1–2	1–1	2–0	1–0	1–0	1–0	0–0	2–1	1–2	0–2	3–0	2–3	1–0	1–0	0–1
Blackpool	1–2	1–1	2–0		2–2	1–1	0–0	1–0	1–2	0–2	1–0	2–1	1–3	0–0	6–0	2–1	0–0	4–1	2–1	2–2	0–1	0–0	2–2	1–2
Bolton Wanderers	1–1	3–1	1–0	2–2		1–0	3–2	2–1	2–1	2–0	0–1	2–0	1–0	4–1	1–2	2–2	0–0	2–1	1–1	2–2	1–0	0–1	2–1	2–0
Brighton & Hove Albion	5–1	0–1	1–1	6–1	1–1		2–0	1–0	0–0	0–0	3–0	2–1	4–1	1–0	1–1	2–2	1–1	0–1	2–2	0–0	1–0	3–0	1–3	2–0
Bristol City	5–3	0–1	3–5	1–1	1–2	0–0		3–4	4–2	0–2	4–1	0–2	1–3	1–2	2–1	2–3	0–4	2–0	1–1	2–0	4–2	1–1	2–0	1–4
Burnley	1–1	1–2	1–1	1–0	2–0	1–3	3–1		1–1	0–1	1–0	2–0	0–1	0–1	2–0	1–0	0–1	0–0	2–2	1–1	5–2	3–3	1–1	2–0
Cardiff City	1–1	2–1	3–0	3–0	1–1	0–2	2–1	4–0		0–0	2–1	1–1	1–0	2–1	0–0	2–1	1–1	1–0	1–0	3–0	1–2	1–0	2–1	3–1
Charlton Athletic	0–1	1–1	1–1	2–1	3–2	2–2	4–1	0–1	5–4		0–1	1–1	1–1	0–0	1–2	2–1	2–1	1–4	0–2	0–2	2–0	1–2	1–2	2–1
Crystal Palace	0–0	0–4	2–0	2–2	0–0	3–0	2–1	4–3	3–2	2–1		3–0	1–1	4–2	5–0	2–2	2–2	4–1	2–2	1–1	3–2	2–1	2–3	3–1
Derby County	2–0	3–2	1–1	4–1	1–1	0–0	3–0	1–2	1–1	3–2	0–1		3–0	1–2	0–1	3–1	2–1	3–1	1–0	1–1	3–1	2–2	5–1	0–0
Huddersfield Town	2–2	1–1	2–2	1–1	2–2	1–2	1–0	2–0	0–0	0–1	1–0	1–0		0–1	0–0	2–4	0–2	2–1	3–0	1–1	2–2	0–0	2–3	2–1
Hull City	1–0	5–2	2–0	2–3	3–1	1–0	0–0	0–1	2–2	1–0	0–0	2–1	2–0		2–1	2–0	0–0	1–0	4–1	1–2	1–3	1–3	0–1	2–1
Ipswich Town	1–1	3–1	1–1	1–0	1–0	0–3	1–1	2–1	1–2	1–2	3–0	1–2	2–2	1–2		3–0	1–0	4–0	3–0	3–1	1–1	0–3	0–2	0–2
Leeds United	1–0	0–1	3–3	2–0	1–0	1–2	1–0	1–0	0–1	1–1	2–1	1–2	1–2	2–3	2–0		1–0	2–1	1–0	2–1	1–1	2–1	1–6	1–0
Leicester City	2–2	2–2	3–0	1–0	3–2	1–0	2–0	2–1	0–1	1–2	1–2	4–1	6–1	3–1	6–0	1–1		1–0	0–1	2–2	2–0	0–1	1–2	2–1
Middlesbrough	2–3	0–1	1–0	4–2	2–1	0–2	1–3	3–2	2–1	2–2	2–1	2–2	3–0	2–0	2–0	1–0	1–2		1–2	1–0	0–0	3–1	1–2	2–0
Millwall	1–2	3–3	1–2	0–2	2–1	1–2	2–1	0–2	0–2	0–0	0–0	2–1	4–0	0–1	0–0	1–0	1–0	3–1		0–1	1–5	1–2	1–0	0–2
Nottingham Forest	0–0	2–2	0–0	1–1	1–1	2–2	1–0	2–0	3–1	2–1	2–2	0–1	6–1	1–2	1–0	4–2	2–3	0–0	1–4		2–1	1–0	0–3	3–1
Peterborough United	2–1	0–2	1–4	1–4	5–4	0–0	1–2	2–2	2–1	2–2	1–2	3–0	3–1	1–1	0–0	1–2	2–1	2–3	1–2	0–1		1–0	3–2	0–2
Sheffield Wednesday	2–1	3–2	3–2	0–2	1–2	3–1	2–3	0–2	0–2	2–0	1–0	2–2	1–3	0–1	1–1	1–1	0–2	2–0	3–2	0–1	2–1		1–4	0–0
Watford	4–1	2–0	4–0	1–2	2–1	0–1	2–2	3–3	0–0	3–4	2–2	2–1	4–0	1–2	0–1	1–2	2–1	1–2	0–0	2–0	1–0	2–1		2–1
Wolverhampton Wanderers	3–1	1–0	1–1	1–2	2–2	3–3	2–1	1–2	1–2	1–1	1–2	1–1	1–3	1–0	0–2	2–2	2–1	3–2	0–1	1–2	0–3	1–0	1–1	

Updated to match(es) played on 4 May 2013. Source: The Football League
Legend: Blue = home team win; Yellow = draw; Red = away team win.

== League One ==
=== Table ===
Pos	Team	Pld	W	D	L	GF	GA	GD	Pts	Promotion, qualification or relegation
1	Doncaster Rovers (C, P)	46	25	9	12	62	44	+18	84	Promotion to Football League Championship
2	Bournemouth (P)	46	24	11	11	76	53	+23	83	Promotion to Football League Championship
3	Brentford	46	21	16	9	62	47	+15	79	Qualification for League One play-offs (Note: Four teams play for one spot and promotion to Football League Championship.)
4	Yeovil Town (O, P)	46	23	8	15	71	56	+15	77	Qualification for League One play-offs
5	Sheffield United	46	19	18	9	56	42	+14	75	Qualification for League One play-offs
6	Swindon Town	46	20	14	12	72	39	+33	74	Qualification for League One play-offs
7	Leyton Orient	46	21	8	17	55	48	+7	71	
8	Milton Keynes Dons	46	19	13	14	62	45	+17	70	
9	Walsall	46	17	17	12	65	58	+7	68	
10	Crawley Town	46	18	14	14	59	58	+1	68	
11	Tranmere Rovers	46	19	10	17	58	48	+10	67	
12	Notts County	46	16	17	13	61	49	+12	65	
13	Crewe Alexandra	46	18	10	18	54	62	−8	64	
14	Preston North End	46	14	17	15	54	49	+5	59	
15	Coventry City	46	18	11	17	66	59	+7	55 (Note: On 28 March Coventry City were deducted ten points for entering administration.)	
16	Shrewsbury Town	46	13	16	17	54	60	−6	55	
17	Carlisle United	46	14	13	19	56	77	−21	55	
18	Stevenage	46	15	9	22	47	64	−17	54	
19	Oldham Athletic	46	14	9	23	46	59	−13	51	
20	Colchester United	46	14	9	23	47	68	−21	51	
21	Scunthorpe United (R)	46	13	9	24	49	73	−24	48	Relegation to Football League Two
22	Bury (R)	46	9	14	23	45	73	−28	41	Relegation to Football League Two
23	Hartlepool United (R)	46	9	14	23	39	67	−28	41	Relegation to Football League Two
24	Portsmouth (R)	46	10	12	24	51	69	−18	32 (Note: On 20 April Portsmouth were deducted ten points after coming out of administration.)	Relegation to Football League Two

Updated to match(es) played on 27 April 2013. Source: BBC Sport
Rules for classification: 1) Points; 2) Goal difference; 3) Number of goals scored
(C) Champions; (O) Play-off winners; (P) Promoted; (R) Relegated

=== Play-offs ===
Semifinals
3	Brentford (p)	1	3	4 (5)
6	Swindon Town	1	3	4 (4)
4	Yeovil Town	0	2	2
5	Sheffield United	1	0	1

Final
3	Brentford	1
4	Yeovil Town	2

=== Results ===
Home \ Away	BOU	BRE	BRY	CRL	COL	COV	CRA	CRE	DON	HAR	LEY	MKD	NTC	OLD	POR	PNE	SCU	SHU	SHR	STE	SWI	TRA	WAL	YEO
Bournemouth		2–2	4–1	3–1	1–0	0–2	3–0	3–1	1–2	1–1	2–0	1–1	3–1	4–1	2–0	1–1	1–0	0–1	2–1	1–1	1–1	3–1	1–2	3–0
Brentford	0–0		2–2	2–1	1–0	2–1	2–1	5–1	0–1	2–2	2–2	3–2	2–1	1–0	3–2	1–0	1–0	2–0	0–0	2–0	2–1	1–2	0–0	1–3
Bury	2–2	0–0		1–1	1–2	0–2	0–2	2–2	2–0	2–1	0–2	1–4	0–2	0–1	2–0	1–2	2–1	0–2	2–2	2–0	0–1	0–1	1–1	3–2
Carlisle United	2–4	2–0	2–1		0–2	1–0	0–2	0–0	1–3	3–0	1–4	1–1	0–4	3–1	4–2	1–1	1–1	1–3	2–2	2–1	2–2	0–3	0–3	3–3
Colchester United	0–1	1–3	2–0	2–0		1–3	1–1	1–2	1–2	3–1	2–1	0–2	0–2	0–2	2–2	1–0	1–2	1–1	0–0	1–0	0–1	1–5	2–0	2–0
Coventry City	1–0	1–1	2–2	1–2	2–2		3–1	1–2	1–0	1–0	0–1	1–1	1–2	2–1	1–1	1–1	1–2	1–1	0–1	1–2	1–2	1–0	5–1	0–1
Crawley Town	3–1	1–2	3–2	1–1	3–0	2–0		2–0	1–1	2–2	1–0	2–0	0–0	1–1	0–3	1–0	3–0	0–2	2–2	1–1	1–1	2–5	2–2	0–1
Crewe Alexandra	1–2	0–2	1–0	1–0	3–2	1–0	2–0		1–2	2–1	1–1	2–1	1–2	0–2	1–2	1–0	1–0	1–0	1–1	1–2	2–1	0–0	2–0	0–1
Doncaster Rovers	0–1	2–1	2–1	0–2	1–0	1–4	0–1	0–2		3–0	2–0	0–0	0–1	1–0	1–1	1–3	4–0	2–2	1–0	1–1	1–0	1–0	1–2	1–1
Hartlepool United	1–2	1–1	2–0	1–2	0–0	0–5	0–1	3–0	1–1		2–1	0–2	2–1	1–2	0–0	0–1	2–0	1–2	2–2	0–2	0–0	0–2	0–0	0–0
Leyton Orient	3–1	1–0	2–0	4–1	0–2	0–1	0–1	1–1	0–2	1–0		2–0	2–1	1–1	1–0	2–0	1–3	0–1	2–1	0–1	0–0	2–1	2–1	4–1
Milton Keynes Dons	0–3	2–0	1–1	2–0	5–1	2–3	0–0	1–0	3–0	1–0	1–0		1–1	2–0	2–2	1–1	0–1	1–0	2–3	0–1	2–0	3–0	2–4	1–0
Notts County	3–3	1–2	4–1	1–0	3–1	2–2	1–1	1–1	0–2	2–0	1–1	1–2		1–0	3–0	0–1	1–0	1–1	3–2	1–2	1–0	0–1	0–1	1–2
Oldham Athletic	0–1	0–2	1–2	1–2	1–1	0–1	2–1	1–2	1–2	3–0	2–0	3–1	2–2		1–0	3–1	1–1	0–2	1–0	0–1	0–2	0–1	1–1	1–0
Portsmouth	1–1	0–1	2–0	1–1	2–3	2–0	1–2	2–0	0–1	1–3	2–3	1–1	0–2	0–1		0–0	2–1	3–0	3–1	0–0	1–2	1–0	1–2	1–2
Preston North End	2–0	1–1	0–0	1–1	0–0	2–2	1–2	1–3	0–3	5–0	0–0	0–0	0–0	2–0	1–1		3–0	0–1	1–2	2–0	4–1	1–0	1–3	3–2
Scunthorpe United	1–2	1–1	1–2	3–1	1–0	1–2	2–1	1–2	2–3	1–2	2–1	0–3	2–2	2–2	2–1	2–3		1–1	0–0	1–0	3–1	1–3	1–1	0–4
Sheffield United	5–3	2–2	1–1	0–0	3–0	1–2	0–2	3–3	0–0	2–3	0–0	0–0	1–1	1–1	1–0	0–0	3–0		1–0	4–1	2–0	0–0	1–0	0–2
Shrewsbury Town	0–3	0–0	0–0	2–1	2–2	4–1	3–0	1–0	1–2	1–1	0–2	2–2	2–2	1–0	3–2	1–0	0–1	1–2		2–1	0–1	1–1	1–0	1–3
Stevenage	0–1	1–0	2–2	1–1	0–2	1–3	1–2	2–2	1–2	1–0	0–1	0–2	2–0	1–2	2–1	1–4	1–0	4–0	1–1		0–4	1–1	3–1	0–2
Swindon Town	4–0	0–1	0–1	4–0	0–1	2–2	3–0	4–1	1–1	1–1	0–1	1–0	0–0	1–1	5–0	1–1	1–1	0–0	2–0	3–0		5–0	2–2	4–1
Tranmere Rovers	0–0	1–1	3–0	0–1	4–0	2–0	2–0	2–1	1–2	0–1	3–1	0–1	1–1	1–0	2–2	1–1	1–0	0–1	0–2	3–1	1–3		0–0	3–2
Walsall	3–1	2–2	1–1	1–2	1–0	4–0	2–2	2–2	0–3	1–1	1–2	1–0	1–1	3–1	2–0	3–1	1–4	1–1	3–1	1–0	0–2	2–0		2–2
Yeovil Town	0–1	3–0	2–1	1–3	3–1	1–1	2–2	1–0	2–1	1–0	3–0	2–1	0–0	4–1	1–2	3–1	3–0	0–1	2–1	1–3	0–2	1–0	0–0	

Updated to match(es) played on 27 April 2013. Source: The Football League
Legend: Blue = home team win; Yellow = draw; Red = away team win.

== League Two ==
=== Table ===
Pos	Team	Pld	W	D	L	GF	GA	GD	Pts	Promotion, qualification or relegation
1	Gillingham (C, P)	46	23	14	9	66	39	+27	83	Promotion to Football League One
2	Rotherham United (P)	46	24	7	15	74	59	+15	79	Promotion to Football League One
3	Port Vale (P)	46	21	15	10	87	52	+35	78	Promotion to Football League One
4	Burton Albion	46	22	10	14	71	65	+6	76	Qualification for League Two play-offs (Note: Four teams play for one spot and promotion to Football League One.)
5	Cheltenham Town	46	20	15	11	58	51	+7	75	Qualification for League Two play-offs
6	Northampton Town	46	21	10	15	64	55	+9	73	Qualification for League Two play-offs
7	Bradford City (O, P)	46	18	15	13	63	52	+11	69	Qualification for League Two play-offs
8	Chesterfield	46	18	13	15	60	45	+15	67	
9	Oxford United	46	19	8	19	59	60	−1	65	
10	Exeter City	46	18	10	18	63	62	+1	64	
11	Southend United	46	16	13	17	61	55	+6	61	
12	Rochdale	46	16	13	17	68	70	−2	61	
13	Fleetwood Town	46	15	15	16	55	57	−2	60	
14	Bristol Rovers	46	16	12	18	60	69	−9	60	
15	Wycombe Wanderers	46	17	9	20	50	60	−10	60	
16	Morecambe	46	15	13	18	55	61	−6	58	
17	York City	46	12	19	15	50	60	−10	55	
18	Accrington Stanley	46	14	12	20	51	68	−17	54	
19	Torquay United	46	13	14	19	55	62	−7	53	
20	AFC Wimbledon	46	14	11	21	54	76	−22	53	
21	Plymouth Argyle	46	13	13	20	46	55	−9	52	
22	Dagenham & Redbridge	46	13	12	21	55	62	−7	51	
23	Barnet (R)	46	13	12	21	47	59	−12	51	Relegation to the Conference Premier
24	Aldershot Town (R)	46	11	15	20	42	60	−18	48	Relegation to the Conference Premier

Updated to match(es) played on 27 April 2013. Source: BBC Sport
Rules for classification: 1) Points; 2) Goal difference; 3) Number of goals scored
(C) Champions; (O) Play-off winners; (P) Promoted; (R) Relegated

=== Play-offs ===
Semifinals
4	Burton Albion	3	1	4
7	Bradford City	2	3	5
5	Cheltenham Town	0	0	0
6	Northampton Town	1	1	2

Final
6	Northampton Town	0
7	Bradford City	3

=== Results ===
Home \ Away	ACC	WIM	ALD	BAR	BRA	BRR	BRT	CHL	CHF	D&R	EXE	FLE	GIL	MOR	NOR	OXF	PLY	PTV	ROC	ROT	STD	TOR	WYC	YOR
Accrington Stanley		4–0	1–0	3–2	1–1	1–0	3–3	2–2	1–0	0–2	0–3	0–3	1–1	2–0	2–4	0–3	1–1	2–0	2–3	1–2	1–1	0–0	0–2	0–1
AFC Wimbledon	1–2		1–1	0–1	2–1	3–1	1–1	1–2	1–0	2–2	2–2	2–1	0–1	2–0	1–1	0–3	1–1	2–2	1–2	0–1	0–4	0–1	2–2	3–2
Aldershot Town	2–0	0–1		1–0	0–2	2–2	1–2	0–1	0–1	1–0	1–2	2–0	1–1	0–0	1–2	3–2	1–2	1–3	4–2	0–3	0–2	1–0	0–0	0–2
Barnet	1–1	1–1	0–1		2–0	1–1	3–2	0–0	0–2	0–0	1–2	2–0	1–3	4–1	4–0	2–2	1–4	0–0	0–0	0–0	2–0	1–0	1–0	1–3
Bradford City	2–1	5–1	1–1	3–0		4–1	1–0	3–1	0–0	1–1	0–1	1–0	0–1	3–1	1–0	1–2	1–0	0–1	2–4	0–2	2–2	1–0	1–0	1–1
Bristol Rovers	0–1	1–0	2–2	2–1	3–3		3–0	0–1	3–2	0–1	2–0	0–0	0–2	0–3	3–1	0–2	2–1	2–0	2–1	1–2	2–3	3–2	1–0	0–0
Burton Albion	1–0	6–2	0–1	1–0	1–0	1–1		3–1	0–1	3–2	4–2	0–1	3–2	3–2	3–3	4–0	1–0	1–1	3–2	2–0	2–0	2–1	2–0	3–1
Cheltenham Town	0–3	2–1	1–1	1–0	0–0	1–1	1–0		1–0	2–0	3–0	2–2	1–0	2–0	1–0	2–1	2–1	1–1	0–0	3–0	1–3	2–1	4–0	1–1
Chesterfield	4–3	2–0	0–0	0–1	2–2	2–0	1–1	4–1		1–2	4–0	1–2	0–1	1–1	3–0	2–1	1–2	2–2	1–1	1–1	0–1	1–1	3–1	3–0
Dagenham & Redbridge	1–1	0–1	0–0	1–0	4–3	2–4	1–1	1–0	0–1		1–1	1–0	1–2	1–2	0–1	0–1	0–0	2–3	2–1	5–0	0–3	2–2	3–0	0–1
Exeter City	2–0	2–0	0–0	2–2	4–1	1–2	3–0	0–1	0–1	0–1		2–2	0–0	0–3	3–0	1–3	1–1	0–2	1–2	0–1	3–0	0–1	3–2	1–1
Fleetwood Town	1–3	1–1	4–1	2–1	2–2	0–3	0–4	1–1	1–3	2–1	0–0		2–2	1–0	1–0	3–0	3–0	2–5	0–3	1–1	0–0	0–0	0–1	0–0
Gillingham	1–0	2–2	4–0	0–1	3–1	4–0	4–1	0–0	1–1	2–1	2–3	2–2		2–1	2–0	0–1	2–1	1–2	1–2	1–0	1–0	1–0	0–1	1–1
Morecambe	0–0	3–1	2–1	4–1	0–0	1–1	0–0	0–0	2–0	2–1	0–3	0–4	1–1		1–1	1–1	2–3	1–3	3–0	2–1	1–0	0–2	0–1	2–2
Northampton Town	2–0	2–0	2–0	2–0	0–1	1–0	1–0	2–3	0–0	3–1	3–0	3–1	1–2	3–0		1–0	1–0	2–0	3–1	2–1	3–3	1–0	3–1	0–2
Oxford United	5–0	3–2	1–1	1–0	0–2	0–2	1–1	1–0	0–1	2–3	2–4	1–2	0–0	1–1	2–1		2–1	2–1	3–0	0–4	2–0	0–0	0–1	0–0
Plymouth Argyle	0–0	1–2	0–2	2–1	0–0	1–1	1–2	2–0	0–1	0–0	1–0	2–1	2–2	2–1	3–2	0–1		1–3	3–1	0–1	1–1	1–1	0–1	2–0
Port Vale	3–0	3–0	1–1	3–0	0–0	4–0	7–1	3–2	0–2	1–1	0–2	0–2	0–2	0–1	2–2	3–0	4–0		2–2	6–2	1–2	1–1	4–1	2–2
Rochdale	0–3	0–1	1–1	2–0	0–0	2–1	0–1	4–1	1–1	2–2	2–3	0–0	1–1	1–2	0–0	2–0	1–0	2–2		1–2	4–2	1–0	4–1	2–3
Rotherham United	4–1	1–0	2–0	0–2	4–0	1–3	3–0	4–2	1–0	1–2	4–1	2–1	1–2	2–1	3–1	3–1	1–0	1–2	2–3		0–3	1–0	2–3	1–1
Southend United	0–1	1–3	1–2	2–2	2–2	0–0	0–1	1–2	3–0	3–1	2–1	1–1	0–1	0–1	1–2	1–0	0–2	0–0	3–1	1–1		1–1	1–0	0–0
Torquay United	3–1	2–3	4–3	3–2	1–3	3–3	1–1	2–2	2–1	2–1	1–1	0–1	2–1	1–0	1–1	1–3	0–0	0–1	4–2	1–3	1–4		1–2	2–1
Wycombe Wanderers	0–1	0–1	2–1	0–0	0–3	2–0	3–0	1–1	2–1	1–0	0–1	1–0	0–1	2–2	0–0	1–3	1–1	1–1	1–2	2–2	1–2	2–1		4–0
York City	1–1	0–3	0–0	1–2	0–2	4–1	3–0	0–0	2–2	3–2	1–2	0–2	0–0	1–4	1–1	3–1	2–0	0–2	0–0	0–0	2–1	0–2	1–3	

Updated to match(es) played on 27 April 2013. Source: The Football League
Legend: Blue = home team win; Yellow = draw; Red = away team win.

== Managerial changes ==
Team	Outgoing manager	Manner of departure	Date of vacancy	Position in table at time of departure	Incoming manager	Date of appointment	Position in table at time of appointment
Burton Albion	Paul Peschisolido	Sacked	17 March 2012	2011–12 season	Gary Rowett	10 May 2012	Pre-season
Bournemouth	Lee Bradbury	Sacked	25 March 2012	2011–12 season	Paul Groves	11 May 2012	Pre-season
Crawley Town	Steve Evans	Signed by Rotherham United	9 April 2012	2011–12 season	Sean O'Driscoll	16 May 2012	Pre-season
Hull City	Nick Barmby	Sacked	8 May 2012	Pre-season	Steve Bruce	8 June 2012	Pre-season
Gillingham	Andy Hessenthaler	Mutual Consent	8 May 2012	Pre-season	Martin Allen	5 July 2012	Pre-season
Barnet	Martin Allen	End of contract	31 May 2012	Pre-season	Mark Robson	11 June 2012	Pre-season
Birmingham City	Chris Hughton	Signed by Norwich City	7 June 2012	Pre-season	Lee Clark	26 June 2012	Pre-season
Wolverhampton Wanderers	Terry Connor	End of contract	30 June 2012	Pre-season	Ståle Solbakken	1 July 2012	Pre-season
Watford	Sean Dyche	Sacked	6 July 2012	Pre-season	Gianfranco Zola	7 July 2012	Pre-season
Nottingham Forest	Steve Cotterill	Sacked	12 July 2012	Pre-season	Sean O'Driscoll	19 July 2012	Pre-season
Crawley Town	Sean O'Driscoll	Signed by Nottingham Forest	19 July 2012	Pre-season	Richard Barker	7 August 2012	Pre-season
Bury	Richard Barker	Signed by Crawley Town	7 August 2012	Pre-season	Kevin Blackwell	26 September 2012	24th
Coventry City	Andy Thorn	Sacked	26 August 2012	14th	Mark Robins	19 September 2012	23rd
Chesterfield	John Sheridan	Sacked	28 August 2012	18th	Paul Cook	25 October 2012	13th
AFC Wimbledon	Terry Brown	Sacked	19 September 2012	21st	Neal Ardley	10 October 2012	21st
Wycombe Wanderers	Gary Waddock	Sacked	22 September 2012	21st	Gareth Ainsworth	7 November 2012	22nd
Colchester United	John Ward	Sacked	24 September 2012	22nd	Joe Dunne	27 September 2012	22nd
Blackburn Rovers	Steve Kean	Resigned	28 September 2012	3rd	Henning Berg	31 October 2012	5th
Bournemouth	Paul Groves	Sacked	3 October 2012	20th	Eddie Howe	12 October 2012	21st
Bolton Wanderers	Owen Coyle	Sacked	9 October 2012	18th	Dougie Freedman	25 October 2012	16th
Barnet	N/A	N/A	N/A	N/A	Edgar Davids (Note: Davids and Robson each have the title of joint head coach at Barnet.)	12 October 2012	24th
Burnley	Eddie Howe	Signed by Bournemouth	12 October 2012	16th	Sean Dyche	30 October 2012	14th
Ipswich Town	Paul Jewell	Mutual Consent	24 October 2012	24th	Mick McCarthy	1 November 2012	24th
Hartlepool United	Neale Cooper	Resigned	24 October 2012	24th	John Hughes	13 November 2012	24th
Crystal Palace	Dougie Freedman	Signed by Bolton Wanderers	25 October 2012	4th	Ian Holloway	3 November 2012	4th
Accrington Stanley	Paul Cook	Signed by Chesterfield	25 October 2012	16th	Leam Richardson	1 November 2012	12th
Scunthorpe United	Alan Knill	Sacked	29 October 2012	22nd	Brian Laws	29 October 2012	22nd
Blackpool	Ian Holloway	Signed by Crystal Palace	3 November 2012	12th	Michael Appleton	7 November 2012	12th
Portsmouth	Michael Appleton	Signed by Blackpool	7 November 2012	17th	Guy Whittingham	24 April 2013	24th
Fleetwood Town	Micky Mellon	Sacked	1 December 2012	7th	Graham Alexander	6 December 2012	7th
Bristol Rovers	Mark McGhee	Sacked	15 December 2012	23rd	John Ward	17 December 2012	23rd
Nottingham Forest	Sean O'Driscoll	Sacked	26 December 2012	8th	Alex McLeish	27 December 2012	8th
Blackburn Rovers	Henning Berg	Sacked	27 December 2012	17th	Michael Appleton	11 January 2013	13th
Barnet	Mark Robson (Note: Davids becomes sole head coach at Barnet.)	Mutual Consent	28 December 2012	21st	N/A	N/A	N/A
Barnsley	Keith Hill	Sacked	29 December 2012	24th	David Flitcroft	13 January 2013	23rd
Plymouth Argyle	Carl Fletcher	Sacked	1 January 2013	20th	John Sheridan	6 January 2013	23rd
Wolverhampton Wanderers	Ståle Solbakken	Sacked	5 January 2013	18th	Dean Saunders	7 January 2013	18th
Doncaster Rovers	Dean Saunders	Signed by Wolverhampton Wanderers	7 January 2013	2nd	Brian Flynn	17 January 2013	2nd
Blackpool	Michael Appleton	Signed by Blackburn Rovers	11 January 2013	14th	Paul Ince	18 February 2013	14th
Bristol City	Derek McInnes	Sacked	12 January 2013	24th	Sean O'Driscoll	14 January 2013	24th
Rochdale	John Coleman	Sacked	21 January 2013	14th	Keith Hill	22 January 2013	14th
Huddersfield Town	Simon Grayson	Sacked	24 January 2013	18th	Mark Robins	14 February 2013	18th
Oldham Athletic	Paul Dickov	Resigned	3 February 2013	20th	Lee Johnson	18 March 2013	21st
Notts County	Keith Curle	Sacked	3 February 2013	10th	Chris Kiwomya	23 February 2013	9th
Nottingham Forest	Alex McLeish	Mutual Consent	5 February 2013	11th	Billy Davies	7 February 2013	11th
Preston North End	Graham Westley	Sacked	13 February 2013	17th	Simon Grayson	18 February 2013	17th
Coventry City	Mark Robins	Signed by Huddersfield Town	14 February 2013	8th	Steven Pressley	8 March 2013	9th
Swindon Town	Paolo Di Canio	Resigned	18 February 2013	6th	Kevin MacDonald	28 February 2013	4th
Aldershot Town	Dean Holdsworth	Sacked	20 February 2013	20th	Andy Scott	22 February 2013	20th
Dagenham & Redbridge	John Still	Signed by Luton Town	26 February 2013	16th	Wayne Burnett	2 May 2013	2013–14 season
York City	Gary Mills	Sacked	2 March 2013	18th	Nigel Worthington	4 March 2013	18th
Blackburn Rovers	Michael Appleton	Sacked	19 March 2013	18th	Gary Bowyer	24 May 2013	2013–14 season
Stevenage	Gary Smith	Sacked	20 March 2013	15th	Graham Westley	30 March 2013	15th
Southend United	Paul Sturrock	Sacked	24 March 2013	9th	Phil Brown	25 March 2013	9th
Leeds United	Neil Warnock	Sacked	1 April 2013	12th	Brian McDermott	12 April 2013	17th
Sheffield United	Danny Wilson	Sacked	10 April 2013	5th	David Weir	10 June 2013	2013–14 season
