= Terry Bramall =

British businessman and philanthropist (born 1942)

- Born: November 20, 1942 (age 83)
- Education: Birmingham University
- Occupation: Businessman
- Spouse: Liz Bramall
- Children: 2

Terence George Bramall CBE (born 20 November 1942) is a British businessman and philanthropist. He is also one of four directors of Doncaster Rovers.

== Early life ==
Bramall graduated from Birmingham University with a BSc degree in Civil Engineering in 1964.

== Career ==
Bramall served as the Chairman of Keepmoat, a British community regeneration and housebuilding company. He sold the group to its management for £783 million in 2007, with Bramall and his family owning 72% at the time.

Bramall had donated £60,000 to the Conservative Party by 2012.

Bramall is a director of Doncaster Rovers Football Club. Bramall was chief executive of the Keepmoat construction group, which specialised in social housing.

He was selected as High Sheriff of West Yorkshire for 2017-18.

In May 2025, the Sunday Times Rich List estimated Bramall's net worth to be £429 million.

== Philanthropy ==
Bramall set up the Liz and Terry Bramall Foundation with a £100 million endowment in 2008. He is a Trustee of the Liz and Terry Bramall Foundation. The charity supports charitable organisations that promote Christian Faith in accordance with the Church of England. A major supporter of the arts, especially within the Yorkshire region, The Liz and Terry Bramall Foundation also supports urban regeneration and education programmes.

Bramall donated £2 million for the completion of Birmingham University’s Bramall Music Building.

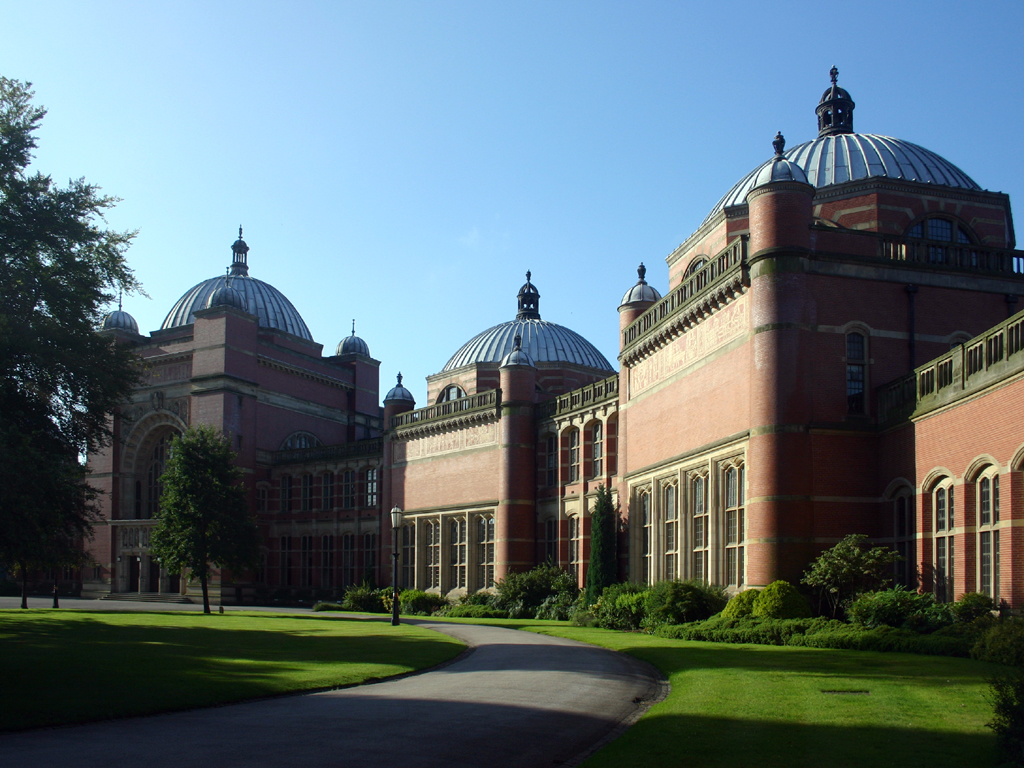
Birmingham University

Bramall was appointed Commander of the Order of the British Empire (CBE) in the 2013 New Years Honours for services to charity. He was awarded The Prince of Wales Medal for Arts Philanthropy in 2014. Bramall was awarded the honorary degree of DUniv by Birmingham University in 2011. Bramall won the National Masters Entrepreneur of the Year award in 2004.
