= Doncaster Rovers F.C. =

Association football club in Doncaster, England

Doncaster Rovers
- Full name: Doncaster Rovers Football Club
- Nicknames: Donny; The Red and White Army
- Short name: Rovers; DRFC
- Founded: 1879; 147 years ago
- Ground: Club Doncaster Sports Village
- Capacity: 15,231
- Owner: Doncaster Rovers Limited
- Chairman: Terry Bramall
- Manager: Grant McCann
- League: EFL League One
- 2025–26: EFL League One, 14th of 24
- Website: doncasterroversfc.co.uk
Home colours	Away colours	Third colours

Doncaster Rovers Football Club is a professional association football club based in Doncaster, South Yorkshire, England. The team currently competes in EFL League One, the third level of the English football league system. The club play their home games at the Club Doncaster Sports Village, having moved from Belle Vue in 2007. Their home strip consists of red and white hoops, which has been the main design of the club's home shirt since 2001 through different variations.

The club was founded in 1879 and turned professional six years later, moving to the Intake Ground. They entered the Midland League in 1891 and were elected into the Football League in 1901. The club lost re-election votes in 1903 and 1905 and so returned to the Midland League. They were admitted into the Football League for a third and final time in 1923 and went on to win the Third Division North in 1934–35. The club won two further Third Division North titles in 1946–47 and 1949–50, having been relegated from the Second Division in 1937 and 1948. Doncaster found themselves in the Fourth Division after suffering consecutive relegations in 1958 and 1959, though would go on to win the Fourth Division title in 1965–66 and 1968–69. The club continued to move between the third and fourth tiers, winning promotions in 1980–81 and 1983–84 and relegations in 1983 and 1988, before suffering relegation into non-League football in 1998.

Doncaster regained their Football League status after winning the 2003 Conference play-offs and then went on to win the Third Division title in 2003–04. They won the Football League Trophy in 2007 and the next year won the League One play-offs to secure a place in the second tier for the first time since 1958. They spent four of the next five seasons in the Championship, winning the League One title in 2012–13, though were relegated out of the Championship in 2012 and 2014. Relegated into League Two in 2016, they won an immediate promotion in 2016–17 and remained in League One until relegation in 2022, before returning to League One in 2025 after clinching the title.

== History ==
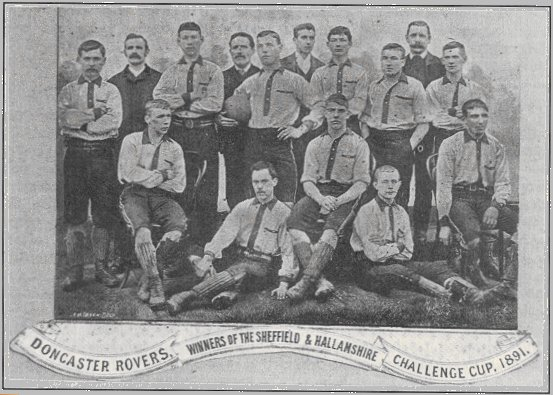
The 1891 Sheffield and Hallamshire Challenge Cup winning Doncaster Rovers team.

=== Early years ===
The club was formed in 1879 by Albert Jenkins, a fitter at Doncaster's Great Northern Railway works. He gathered together some friends to play a match against the Yorkshire Institute for the Deaf in September 1879. The institute side took a 4–0 lead but the game ended as a 4–4 draw. On walking back from the game, the team took a rest at the Hall Cross, and had a discussion in which they decided to play more and called themselves Doncaster Rovers.

The first match under the name was on 3 October 1879, a draw away against Rawmarsh. The club turned professional in 1885. Gradually, they became the main team in the town, and appear to have had their first professional players in 1887–88.

Rovers first entered the FA Cup in 1888–89, losing 9–1 to Rotherham Town at home. Season 1890–91 was to be a significant move forward. The club were a founder member of the Midland Alliance League and came second. The following season, saw them enter the Sheffield and Hallamshire FA Challenge Cup, beating Sheffield United 2–1 at Bramall Lane to win the final. That same season, they also moved up to the Midland League, becoming Champions in 1896–97 and 1898–99.

They were first elected to the Football League in 1901, as a replacement for New Brighton Tower. Their first season in the League was in fact the one when Doncaster achieved their highest position ever (7th in the Football League Second Division). They only lasted two seasons in the league before being voted out in favour of local rivals Bradford City, having finished the 1902 season in the bottom three.

League Positions from 1902 to the present

They spent the following season in the Midland League, only managing 11th place out of 18 but were elected back to Division 2. This time, in 1904–05, Doncaster finished bottom with W3 D2 L29, adrift by 12 points, gaining only 8 points – an unfortunate still standing record. They were voted out once again. The following several seasons saw them finish lower midtable of the Midland League, till between 1910 and 1913 they had greater success. The last few years before the war mediocrity returned, and in August 1914 debts run up over the years led to voluntary liquidation. However, a new club was formed in time for the 1914–15 season and was accepted into the Midland League to continue where the old club had left off. The outbreak of the First World War meant the club closed down, and the army took over its ground using it as a depot.

=== Inter war period ===
The club re-formed as a limited company after the war in 1919, rejoining the Midland League a year later playing at their new temporary Bennetthorpe Ground. The first two seasons Rovers finished lower-mid table. The third season they moved to Belle Vue, finished runners up and were accepted into the Football League Division 3 North for 1923–24 to replace Stalybridge Celtic.

The first match back in the Football League was a 0–0 draw against Wigan Borough at Belle Vue on 25 August 1923, with Rovers playing in red tops with white shorts. One of the players in that first match was Rovers legend Tom Keetley who went on to become the club's highest scorer with 186 goals in 241 appearances. Doncaster ended the season in 9th place. The next few seasons saw them rise towards the top of the table, then decline towards the bottom, before in the early 1930s finishing consistently near the top and finally becoming Champions in 1934–35.

Rovers spent two seasons in Division 2, relegated in 1936–37. However, they did well in the following two seasons before the outbreak of war, being runners up in Division 3 North, with only the champions being promoted at that time.

=== Second World War – late 1990s ===
Doncaster Rovers were involved in the longest ever competitive football match, against Stockport County at Edgeley Park on 30 March 1946, in a Division Three North cup tie. The match was deadlocked at 2–2 at 90 minutes, and after two 10-minute periods of extra time there was no further score. The rule at that time was that the game would carry on until one team scored. However, after 203 minutes, and with darkness closing in, the game was finally stopped. Fans were said to have left the game, gone home for their tea, and come back to watch the end of the game. The replay, at Doncaster, was won by Rovers 4–0.

In 1946–47 Doncaster set a record for the most games won in a league season (33), when they won the Third Division North title. The following season saw them relegated from the Second Division, but two years later with Peter Doherty as player-manager, they won the Third Division North again. This time they stayed in the Second Division for eight seasons, their most successful period to date.

During this time, several high class players were with Doncaster including Harry Gregg who kept goal, and was sold to Manchester United in December 1957 for £23,500. At the time, he was the most expensive goalkeeper in the world. He went on to help save lives in the Munich air disaster and was a regular goalkeeper for Northern Ireland. Another player, lesser known outside Doncaster, was Alick Jeffrey. Matt Busby, manager of Manchester United, had lined him up to be bought, however in October 1956 Jeffrey badly broke his leg playing for England under-23s. This ended his move and any chance of what was seen to be an almost certain glittering international career to come. Doncaster suffered two consecutive relegations in 1958 and 1959 to drop to the Fourth Division.

Billy Bremner, who achieved fame for his playing career with Leeds United and Scotland, managed Doncaster twice, his final spell ending in November 1991 – six years before his death.

=== Richardson era ===
During the early 1990s, Ken Richardson took over as the majority shareholder of the club. He invested a significant amount of money into Doncaster Rovers with the aim of obtaining a new stadium. When he was refused a new stadium by the council he soon lost interest. Richardson hired three men to set a fire at Belle Vue and planned to sell the ground to developers. The attempt put Richardson in jail for four years, ruined Belle Vue and Rovers were edging closer to relegation. In 1998 Rovers dropped out of the league with a −83 goal difference. He withdrew his financial backing and as a result the club was subject to an administration order. The better players were sold to ease some of the financial burden. The fans blamed Richardson for effectively destroying Rovers and even a funeral was held at Belle Vue on the last game of the 1997–98 season complete with coffin along Carr House Road.

=== The rise ===
The Westferry Consortium took over the club just before the beginning of the 1998–99 season with a commitment to invest heavily in the club. The new ownership stated aspirations of returning it to the second tier and building a new stadium within ten years, both of which they went on to achieve within the ten years. Doncaster found their best form in 50 years in the 2000s.

After five seasons in the Conference, under the helm of manager Dave Penney the club returned to the fourth tier (known at the time as Division Three) after winning the 2003 Conference play-off final, in the only sudden death goal in the history of English football promotion play-offs. In 2003–04, the first season they were back in the Football League, Rovers achieved promotion to the third tier as champions. Doncaster were the first team to win the fourth level Championship three times, 1966, 1969, and 2004.

In 2005–06, Doncaster defeated two Premier League teams in the League Cup – Manchester City and Aston Villa. They reached the quarter-finals of the competition where they met Arsenal. They went ahead in normal time and Arsenal equalised, and in extra time Rovers went up for a second time but Gilberto Silva equalised in injury time and the North London side went on to win on penalties. Penney left in August 2006 feeling he had taken the club as far as he could and was swiftly replaced with former AFC Bournemouth manager Sean O'Driscoll.

A new stadium was completed in December 2006. Doncaster's first game at the new Keepmoat Stadium was against Huddersfield Town on New Year's Day, 2007 and the first goal scored at the Stadium was by Mark McCammon.

=== 2007–2023 ===
In the 2006–07 season, Doncaster reached the final of the Football League Trophy at the Millennium Stadium. After a 2–2 draw with Bristol Rovers in normal time, a header from captain Graeme Lee in extra time saw Doncaster claim their first major trophy.

Doncaster's starting line-up for the 2008 Play Off Final win against Leeds United.

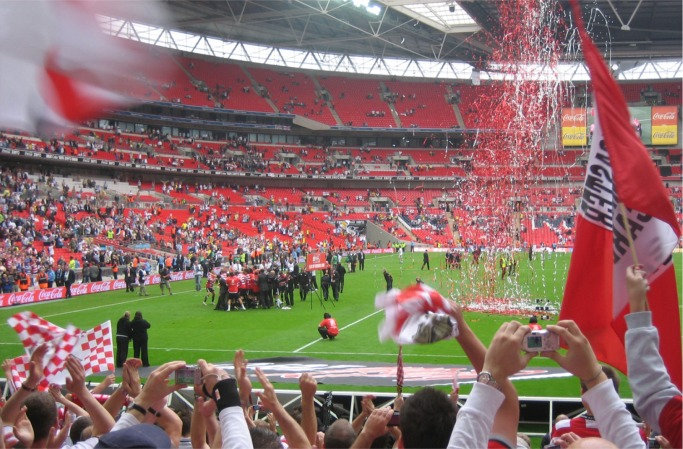
Doncaster Rovers celebrate victory against Leeds United in the Football League One play-off final on 25 May 2008 at Wembley Stadium.

In the 2007–08 season, Doncaster narrowly missed out on automatic promotion on the final day of the season to Nottingham Forest. They defeated Southend United 5–1 in the semi-final to advance to the League One play-off final at Wembley Stadium. They beat Leeds United 1–0 in the final on 25 May 2008 to return to the second tier after a half century absence. A James Hayter headed goal in the 47th minute was enough to secure victory in front of over 75,000 fans at Wembley. The first half of the 2008–09 season saw Doncaster struggling to adapt to the Championship. However, Doncaster ended their first season in the Championship comfortably in 14th position. Doncaster finished the 2009–10 season marginally better than their first season back in the Championship, in 12th and earning two more points than the previous season with 60 points. This was despite a promising period towards the end of the season which saw Doncaster close to the play-off places, thanks in part to Sheffield United loanee Billy Sharp who scored 15 goals during his stay.

The 2010–11 season saw Doncaster struggle. Despite a club record signing of £1.15 million for Billy Sharp, the season was plagued by injuries to key players, as well as poor form. They finished in 21st place, 6 points clear of relegated local rivals Sheffield United and Scunthorpe United.

Doncasters' starting line-up for the match against Portsmouth which saw Doncaster get relegated.

Rovers struggled in the 2011–12 season; seven games into the season, Rovers had failed to win a game. This led to the sacking of manager Sean O'Driscoll, who was later replaced by Dean Saunders from Wrexham. His reign started unbeaten in three games. With the controversial help of football agent Willie McKay, Rovers brought in several players on loans and short-term contracts, and on low wages, including El Hadji Diouf, Pascal Chimbonda, Herita Ilunga, Carl Ikeme, Frédéric Piquionne, and Habib Beye. However, Doncaster were relegated to League One with three games remaining.

The squad was rebuilt for the 2012–13 season with 19 players leaving. Expectations were low, but after an average start, Saunders' team ended up firmly in the promotion positions by the end of 2012. On 7 January, Saunders filled the vacant managers position at Wolves and on 17 January caretaker manager Brian Flynn was given the role permanently until the end of the season. In an incredible finale to the season at Griffin Park, they beat Brentford 1–0 when James Coppinger scored in the last seconds of 5 minutes of added time, only seconds after Brentford's Marcello Trotta had hit a penalty against the crossbar. If Brentford had won, they would have been promoted and Doncaster would have to compete in the play-offs. As it was, the goal put Doncaster one point above Bournemouth as champions.

Following promotion to the Championship for the 2013–14 season, Brian Flynn was moved to become Director of Football and overseeing the newly formed development squad which would be playing competitive games. Paul Dickov was brought in as manager. To boost support for their chosen charity, Bluebell Wood Children's Hospice, the club signed One Direction singer Louis Tomlinson on a non-contract basis.

On 9 November, John Ryan gave an emotional farewell and stepped down as chairman of the club after 15 years, minutes before the kick-off against a Championship encounter against Barnsley at Oakwell, amid reports of boardroom disagreements following a proposed takeover bid by a hedge-fund consortium led by Sequentia Capital. On 3 May 2014, Doncaster were relegated back to League One after just one season following a 1–0 defeat to Leicester City on the final day of the season.

Rovers finished the 2014–15 season in 13th place, before being relegated to League Two after finishing 21st in 2015–16 with new manager Darren Ferguson. The 2016–17 season saw them being promoted back to League One at the first attempt in 3rd position, missing out on the title on the final day of the season.

Darren Ferguson left his post in June 2018 and was replaced by another former Peterborough boss in Grant McCann ahead of the 2018–19 season. Under McCann, Rovers finished sixth in League One, qualifying for the end of season play-offs where they faced Charlton Athletic over two legs. A 2–1 defeat in the first leg and an early Krystian Bielik goal in the second left Rovers with a mountain to climb at The Valley, but goals from captain Tommy Rowe and Andy Butler forced extra time. John Marquis put Rovers ahead for the first time in extra time, only for Darren Pratley to equalise a minute later. Rovers lost the penalty shoot-out 4–3 with misses coming from Rowe and Marquis as they fell just short of making the Wembley Stadium showdown.

McCann left in the summer for Championship side Hull City and was replaced by former defender Darren Moore ahead of the 2019–20 campaign. With the club sitting around the play-offs in December, the club's season looked to be going well. However, Moore moved to struggling Sheffield Wednesday on 1 March 2021, and Andy Butler was appointed as interim manager for the remainder of the season. Doncaster finished the season in 14th place in League One.

For the 2021–22 season, former trophy winning Doncaster Rovers player Richie Wellens was installed as first team manager. Wellens was relieved of his duties as Doncaster Rovers manager on 2 December 2021. Doncaster appointed then under-18s manager Gary McSheffrey as the interim manager, later deciding that McSheffrey was a good fit, and gave him the position full-time on 29 December 2021. Doncaster Rovers finished the season in 22nd place, relegating them to League Two. Rovers then finished 18th in League Two in the 2022–23 season, sacking McSheffrey in October 2022 then his successor Danny Schofield after the season's end.

=== 2023–present ===
On 12 May 2023 Rovers re-appointed Grant McCann as manager. McCann helped Rovers to a club record-equalling run of 10 successive wins to climb into the top seven in the final week of the 2023–24 season, though the club lost on penalties to Crewe Alexandra at the play-off semi-final stage. McCann led Doncaster to the League Two title in the following season, beating Notts County in the final match of the season.

== Players ==
=== Current squad ===
As of 26 September 2026

Note: Flags indicate national team as defined under FIFA eligibility rules; some limited exceptions apply. Players may hold more than one non-FIFA nationality.

No.	Pos.	Nation	Player
1	GK	ENG	Tommy Simkin (on loan from Stoke City)
2	DF	ENG	Jamie Sterry
3	DF	ENG	James Husband
4	MF	ENG	Owen Bailey (captain)
5	DF	ENG	Matty Pearson
6	DF	IRL	Jay McGrath
7	MF	ENG	Tommi O'Reilly (on loan from Aston Villa)
8	MF	ENG	George Broadbent
9	FW	ENG	Brandon Hanlan
10	FW	ENG	Alfie May (on loan from Huddersfield Town)
11	FW	IRL	Leon Ayinde
12	DF	IRL	Neill Byrne
14	FW	ENG	Francis Okoronkwo
15	MF	WAL	Harry Clifton
16	DF	ENG	Tom Nixon

No.	Pos.	Nation	Player
17	FW	IRL	James Collins (on loan from Lincoln City)
18	FW	IRL	Will Keane
19	FW	ENG	Jordan Thomas
20	MF	NIR	Darren Robinson
21	MF	ENG	Isaac Hutchinson
22	MF	ENG	Robbie Gotts
23	DF	ENG	Jack Senior
25	DF	NIR	Bayley McCann
27	DF	IRL	Seán Grehan
32	GK	ENG	Jake Oram
37	MF	ENG	Sam Straughan-Brown
40	DF	ENG	Kasper Williams
41	GK	ENG	Jacob Bryant
42	GK	NIR	Josh Clarke (on loan from Partick Thistle)
47	FW	ENG	Hakeeb Adelakun

=== Out on loan ===
Note: Flags indicate national team as defined under FIFA eligibility rules; some limited exceptions apply. Players may hold more than one non-FIFA nationality.

No.	Pos.	Nation	Player
—	DF	ENG	Bobby Faulkner (at Tranmere Rovers until 30 June 2027)

== Academy ==
The youth system currently has Category 3 status with the U18 academy team playing in the EFL Youth Alliance North East Conference league.

== Non-playing staff ==
Board
Role	Person
Chairman	Terry Bramall
Directors	Terry Bramall; Gavin Baldwin
Chief Executive	Gavin Baldwin

First-team staff
Role	Person
Manager	(Northern Ireland) Grant McCann
Assistant Manager	(Republic of Ireland) Cliff Byrne
First Team Coach	(England) James Coppinger
Goalkeeping Coach	(Wales) Kyle Letheren
Head of Recruitment	(Scotland) Lee Glover
Head of Medical	(England) Dave Rennie
Club Doctor	(England) Dr Tim Douglas

== Stadium ==
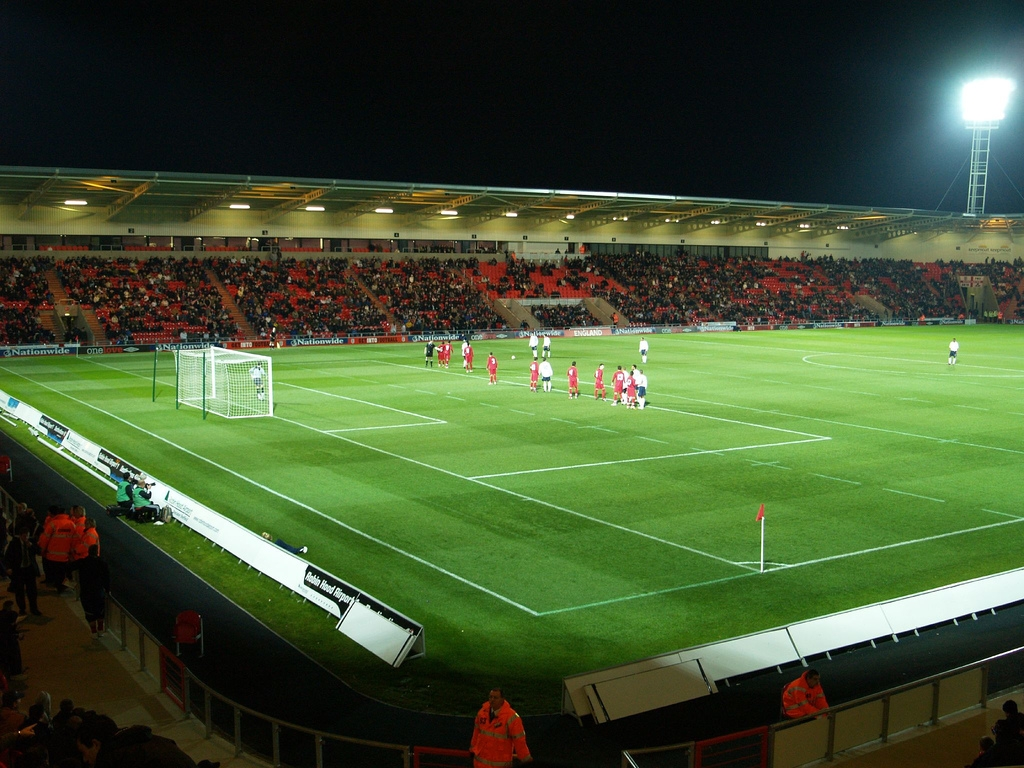
Current home of Doncaster Rovers – Club Doncaster Sports Village

=== 1885–1915: Intake Ground ===
For the first six years the club began playing their games wherever they could, on playing fields at Town Moor and the Racecourse. They gained a permanent ground in 1885 when they started playing their games near the Institute for the Deaf and Dumb and so was known as the Deaf and Dumb Ground. A year later the stadium was officially named as the Intake Ground. A few months after completion, the roof blew off the stand, and the same happened in 1894 on the press and team officials stand after a gale. They played their football there until August 1914 when the club went into liquidation. A new company did take over the club soon after but all English league competition was suspended in 1915 due to the First World War and the club was closed down and the ground turned into an Army depot.

=== 1920–1922: Bennetthorpe Ground ===
When the club was re-formed after the war in the summer of 1919, the Army were still occupying the old Intake Ground as a depot. They had wanted to move to Low Pastures but restrictions set by the local council meant this was not a viable option. The Club did not join the Midland League until 1920–21, by which time and as a temporary solution, a field was found on the south side of Bennetthorpe for which they were given a two-year lease. On the first day of the second season (1921–22) there, in the Midland League, the Bennetthorpe Ground saw 7,219 people watch Rovers against Gainsborough Trinity. The ground consisted of a small stand on one side and small organised terraces around the pitch. Some of the fencing/gates on Town Moor Avenue remain.

=== 1922–2006: Low Pasture, Belle Vue ===
With council restrictions on the six acre Low Pastures site having been satisfactorily negotiated, the club moved there for the beginning of the 1922–23 season. Large amounts of ash from nearby coal tips was laid as a base for the pitch, serving it well throughout its years of use with superb drainage. Initially, there was a stand for 4,000 seated fans with terracing in front for another 3,000. The ground had a unique feature in that home and away teams had separate entrances. The stadium was opened in 1922 by Charles Sutcliffe, a representative of the Football League when it was named Belle Vue. The first match there was against Gainsborough Trinity in the Midland League with an attendance of 10,000. After two years, shelter was added for standing spectators on the "Popular Side". A few years later in 1927, the stand from the Bennet Thorpe Ground was jacked up and moved to the new venue providing a sheltered stand at the "Town End". The "Popular Side" was extended in 1927 and concreted in 1928. Turnstiles, gates and fencing were added in 1935, and in 1938 the "Popular Side" stand roof was replaced and put further back increasing the capacity of Belle Vue to 40,000. In 1947 the stadium recorded its highest attendance of 37,099 against Hull City, although apocryphal accounts refute this and claim that many more gained entry to the ground by climbing over walls and thus avoided having to pay.

Following the Bradford City stadium fire disaster, in 1985 the wooden "Cow Shed", as the old Bennetthorpe stand was known, had to be removed for safety reasons. Mining subsidence in 1987 meant much of the "Pop Side" was removed, drastically reducing the grounds capacity to around 10,000. Further safety conditions imposed after the Hillsborough disaster led the capacity to fall to 7,294.

When the Westferry Consortium took over the club in 1998 one of the first guarantees was to help establish a new stadium for the club. Belle Vue had never been upgraded heavily since 1938 and despite minor cosmetic changes and the addition of some seating was really showing its age by the time Westferry took over. Despite this, some improvements were made in the last few years of its use as the club rose out of the conference, through Division 3 and into League 1. The Town End terracing was made safe and usable with portacabins added as executive stands behind it. The Rossington End was also extended and updated, with the capacity in its final years rising to around 11,500.

In 2003 it was renamed the Earth Stadium after Earth Finance started sponsoring the ground. Belle Vue was Doncaster's home for 84 years.

=== 2007–present: Keepmoat/Eco-Power Stadium/Club Doncaster Sports Village ===
A new 15,231 all-seated stadium owned by Doncaster Metropolitan Borough Council and rented by the club, was completed in December 2006. The first game at the new Keepmoat Stadium was against Huddersfield Town on New Year's Day, 2007. The game also saw the first three red cards in the new stadium. Doncaster Rovers' centre forward Mark McCammon was the first player ever to score on the new pitch in a football match. The official opening of the Keepmoat Stadium was on 3 August 2007, with Doncaster Rovers playing a Manchester United XI in front of a crowd of 13,080. United won the game 2–0 with Anderson making his debut for them.

On 19 June 2012 it was confirmed that Doncaster Rovers had secured a 99-year operating lease from the council to lead the management of the Keepmoat stadium with a view to improving operating results. The change placed the club back in charge of its home stadium after the period of renting since its move from Belle Vue (also leased from the council) in 2007. On 11 August 2012, the stadium was officially handed over to chairman John Ryan in a presentation before the League Cup tie with York City.

On 27 December 2021, the stadium underwent a name change in line with the sponsorship rights being handed over from Keepmoat Homes to the Eco-Power Group.

== Training facilities ==
Doncaster train at Cantley Park which has been their main training facility since June 2000. The site was originally leased from Case IH.

== Crests ==
The coat of arms of the town of Doncaster that was used by Doncaster Rovers prior to 1972.

The Viking crest used by Doncaster Rovers from 1972.

Like most of the early English football clubs, the original crest adopted by Doncaster Rovers was that of the local coat of arms. The coat of arms of Doncaster at the time was of two lions holding Yorkshire roses in their mouths as well as a red shield depicting the old medieval Doncaster Castle. The coat of arms is primarily red and white which explains the team's decision to adopt red and white as their colours. The club stopped using Doncaster's coat of arms in 1972 when the Viking crest was introduced.

In the sixties Doncaster council denied Rovers permission to use the coat of arms and therefore a competition was held, from which the best design would be selected as the club's new badge. The winner and current crest was designed by a group of local students and named "the Viking".

When the new crest was introduced it included a monochrome Viking image overlaying a red and white circle, which denoted the club's colours, along with the year of the club's formation 1879. The Viking image would become known as "The Turk's Head". Also included on the crest was a shield with the club's initials – D.R.F.C. as well as the Yorkshire white rose in reference to the club's location. The inset shield was also coloured red and white to denote the team colours. In the early 1990s the crest was altered, omitting the red and white circle background and the Viking image was coloured gold.

A further modification to the Doncaster Rovers crest was introduced in 2006 and used until 2012. This version included a new Yorkshire rose design on the shield as well as a slightly different Viking image in dark yellow.

The club reverted to the previously used design in 2012 with a two-tone gold background. This is the version still in use by the club today.

== Kits and sponsorship ==
This was the first strip worn by the club in 1879.
This was the first strip worn by the club when they were elected to the football league in 1901.

From 1879 to 1885 Doncaster played in blue and white, and since then red and white. The club's first strip was a navy blue and white strip with a yellow diagonal cross. The kit uniquely included a blue Tam o' Shanter with a red toorie at the centre. A solid red shirt with a black collar was the first design adopted when the club first entered the English Football league in 1901. Since 2001 the club have played in a red and white hooped home shirt.

The home shirts have been red and white hooped (44 seasons), solid red (37), solid white (18), and red and white striped (10).

In recent years, Rovers have had a third kit each season promoting mental health charity Campaign Against Living Miserably (CALM), with proceeds of certain home games being donated to the charity.

Season(s)	Shirt manufacturer	Main sponsor	Second shirt sponsor*
1879–1977	None	None	None
1978–1979	Umbro	None	None
1979–1981	Sereena	None	None
1981–1982	Lynx	None	None
1982–1984	Gertroot	None	None
1982–1984	Hobbott	CIL	None
1984–1987	Hobbott	Pilkington Glass	None
1987–1988	Spall	St. George's Car Centre	None
1988–1990	Spall	Doncaster Free Press	None
1990–1992	Ribero	Doncaster Free Press	None
1992–1993	Matchwinner	Doncaster Free Press	None
1993–1994	Matchwinner	European Car Rental	None
1994–1995	Matchwinner	Doncaster Star	None
1995–1996	Matchwinner	Hayselden Motors	None
1996–1997	Patrick	East Riding Sacks	None
1997–1998	Olympic Sports	East Riding Sacks	None
1998–1999	Asics	Beazer Homes	None
1999–2001	Viking Leisurewear	Beazer Homes	None
2001–2002	Vandanel	One Call Insurance	None
2002–2003	Vandanel	Ledger Mobility	None
2003–2006	Carlotti	Streetwise Sports	Toyota
2006–2007	Streetwise Sports	Carlotti	Toyota
2007–2008	Carlotti	Wright Investments	Stoneacre Motor Group
2008–2010	Vandanel	Wright Investments	Stoneacre Motor Group
2010–2013	Nike	One Call Insurance	Stoneacre Motor Group
2013–2016	Avec	One Call Insurance	Stoneacre Motor Group
2016–2017	FBT	One Call Insurance	Stoneacre Motor Group
2017–2018	FBT	Virgin Trains East Coast	Stoneacre Motor Group
2018–2019	FBT	LNER	Stoneacre Motor Group
2019–2020	Elite Pro Sports	LNER	Stoneacre Motor Group
2020-2021	Elite Pro Sports	LNER	Stoneacre Motor Group
2021-2022	Elite Pro Sports	LNER	Stoneacre Motor Group
2022-2023	Oxen	Eco-Power	Stoneacre Motor Group
2023-2024	Oxen	Eco-Power	Stoneacre Motor Group
2024-2025	Oxen	Eco-Power	Stoneacre Motor Group
2025-2026	Oxen	Pass Logistics	Stoneacre Motor Group
2026-2027	Oxen	Pass Logistics	Stoneacre Motor Group

LNER pledged their sponsorship for 2 further years after the 2018–2019 season. Stoneacre also agreed a new contract with the club to last until the end of the 2021–2022 season extending the partnership to 13 years.

Pass Logistics signed a 2 year front of shirt sponsorship commitment to the club for the 2025-26 and 2026-27 EFL League One seasons and is the current shirt sponsor for Doncaster Rovers FC.

== Mascot ==
The team's mascot, previously portrayed by Andrew Liney, is a brown dog known as Donny Dog that wears a red and white Rovers jersey. Before a scheduled appearance during the game against Huddersfield Town at the Galpharm Stadium on 4 March 2006, police prevented Liney from entering the stadium in costume, citing unspecified "police intelligence", and refused him permission to wear any part of the costume within 50 metres of the stadium. Mr Liney later received a full written apology for these unfounded allegations from the head of West Yorkshire Police. The mascot was next portrayed by Tracy Chandler and in June 2011, she was relieved from the position after she posed in her underwear for a Sunday newspaper. Later in the same week she was reinstated back as the club's mascot.

A second mascot, a yellow haired and bearded Viking with a helmet and wearing the away shirt named Eric the Viking, made its first appearance at the home game against Yeovil on 25 February 2013.

== Fanzine ==
Doncaster Rovers' fanzine is called "Popular Stand" which was first launched on 17 January 1998. Previously there have been several other fanzines "Raise The Roof", "Warboys is still God" and "Keegan Was Crap Really" which are no longer being published. The fanzine sells at £1 which is the same price as when it was first published in 1998. All of its profits of the fanzine are donated to Doncaster Rovers or related causes. Popular Stand is currently edited by Glen Wilson.

In 2016 Popular Stand won the Football Supporters' Federation Fanzine of the Year.

== Rivalries ==
Doncaster Rovers' main rivals are Rotherham United, Barnsley, and Scunthorpe United, with Sheffield Wednesday, Sheffield United, Chesterfield, Leeds United, Mansfield Town, Grimsby Town, Bradford City and Nottingham Forest all being rivalries to a lesser extent.

== In popular culture ==
=== TV ===
In 1998 Rovers featured in a documentary on Yorkshire Television. This episode titled "Trading Places" documents and contrasts the 1997–98 season for two of the region's football clubs; Rovers heading out of the Football League and Halifax Town heading the opposite the way as Champions of the Conference. Also in 1998 the club was featured in the 1998 Channel 5 'fly-on-the-wall' documentary "They Think It's All Rovers" in which it showed the fall of Rovers. In the early 1980s there was a documentary about Billy Bremner as the manager of Rovers. The documentary is notable not only for the inside look at the pre-match preparations, warm-up conducted in the dressing rooms, starting line-up read out as if it is coming to Bremner there and then, but for such rare footage of early 1980s Belle Vue, with a full-size Popular Stand and the Cow Shed still standing at the Town End.

== League history ==
Doncaster Rovers have played their football in the following leagues:

Midland Alliance League
1890–91

Midland Football League:
1891–92 to 1900–01, 1903–04, 1905–06 to 1922–23

Football League:
1901–02 to 1902–03, 1904–05, 1923–24 to 1997–98, 2003–04 to Present

2nd Tier – Division 2, Championship:
1901–02 to 1902–03, 1904–05, 1935–36 to 1936–37, 1947–48, 1950–51 to 1957–58, 2008–09 to 2011–12, 2013–14

3rd Tier – Division 3 North, Division 3, League 1:
1923–24 to 1934–35, 1937–38 to 1946–47, 1948–49 to 1949–50, 1958–59, 1966–67, 1969–70 to 1970–71, 1981–82 to 1982–83, 1984–85 to 1987–88, 2004–05 to 2007–08, 2012–13, 2014–15 to 2015–16, 2017–18 to 2020–21, 2025–26 to Present

4th Tier – Division 4, Division 3:
1959–60 to 1965–66, 1967–68 to 1968–69, 1971–72 to 1980–81, 1983–84, 1988–89 to 1997–98, 2003–04, 2016–17, 2022–23 to 2024–25

5th Tier – Football Conference
1998–99 to 2002–03

=== Last ten seasons ===
Doncaster Rovers: League Standings for last 10 Seasons
Season	League	Pos	P	W	D	L	F	A	GD	Pts
2024–25	League 2	1st	46	24	12	10	73	50	+23	84
2023–24	League 2	5th	46	21	8	17	73	68	+5	71
2022–23	League 2	18th	46	16	7	23	46	65	−19	55
2021–22	League 1	22nd	46	10	8	28	37	82	−45	38
2020–21	League 1	14th	46	19	7	20	63	67	−4	64
2019–20	League 1	9th	34	16	11	9	51	33	18	54
2018–19	League 1	6th	46	20	13	13	76	58	18	73
2017–18	League 1	15th	46	13	17	16	52	52	0	56
2016–17	League 2	3rd	46	25	10	11	85	55	30	85
2015–16	League 1	21st	46	11	13	22	48	64	−16	46

Pos = Position; P = Played; W = Won; D = Drawn; L = Lost; F = Goals for; A = Goals against; GD = Goal difference; Pts = Points

== Managerial history ==
=== Player of the Year ===
The following players have won Doncaster Rovers Player of the year award.

Season	Winner	Notes
1991–92	(Republic of Ireland) Eddie Gormley	
1992–93	(Republic of Ireland) Eddie Gormley	
1996–97	(Scotland) Colin Cramb	
1997–98	(England) Lee Warren	
1998–99	(England) Ian Duerden	
1999–2000	(England) Simon Marples	
2000–01	(Scotland) Jamie Paterson	
2001–02	(Scotland) Jamie Paterson	
2002–03	(England) Paul Barnes	
2003–04	(England) Gregg Blundell	
2004–05	(Scotland) Michael McIndoe	
2005–06	(Scotland) Michael McIndoe	
2006–07	(England) Adam Lockwood / Graeme Lee	
2007–08	(England) Richie Wellens	
2008–09	(England) Matthew Mills	
2009–10	(England) James O'Connor	
2010–11	(England) Billy Sharp	
2011–12	(England) George Friend	
2012–13	(England) Rob Jones	
2013–14	(England) Chris Brown	
2014–15	(England) Nathan Tyson	
2015–16	(England) Craig Alcock	Voted by Sheffield Star
2016–17	(England) John Marquis / James Coppinger	
2017–18	(England) James Coppinger	
2018–19	(England) Ben Whiteman	
2019–20	n/a	Season void
2020–21	(England) James Coppinger	
2021–22	(England) Tommy Rowe	
2024-25	(England) Luke Molyneux	

== Honours ==
League

- Third Division North / League One (level 3)
  - Champions: 1934–35, 1946–47, 1949–50, 2012–13
  - Runners-up: 1937–38, 1938–39
  - Play-off winners: 2008
- Fourth Division / Third Division / League Two (level 4)
  - Champions: 1965–66, 1968–69, 2003–04, 2024–25
  - Runners-up: 1983–84
  - Promoted: 1980–81, 2016–17
- Football Conference (level 5)
  - Play-off winners: 2003
- Midland Football League
  - Champions: 1896–97, 1898–99
  - Runners-up: 1900–01, 1922–23
- Midland Alliance League
  - Runners-up: 1890–91
- Yorkshire League
  - Runners-up: 1898–99

Cup

- Football League Trophy
  - Winners: 2006–07
- Conference League Cup
  - Winners: 1998–99, 1999–2000
- Sheffield and Hallamshire County Cup
  - Winners (7): 1935–36, 1937–38, 1940–41, 1955–56, 1967–68, 1975–76, 1985–86

== Other teams ==
Doncaster Rovers Belles were formed by Rover's lottery ticket saleswomen in 1969 as Belle Vue Belles. They merged with the Official DRFC Women's side in 2003 becoming Doncaster Rovers Belles, though they were still run independently. In 2019 they became part of Club Doncaster. They currently play in the FA Women's National League Division One Midlands. Their home games are played at Oxford Street, Rossington.

Whilst not affiliated in any way to the English club, Doncaster Rovers of Melbourne, Australia, who play in the Victoria Leagues, were formed in 1967 and named after them.
