= Stoneacre Motor Group =

Car dealership group based in the UK

- Company type: Private
- Industry: Car Dealership
- Founded: December 1994
- Headquarters: Doncaster, United Kingdom
- Revenue: £982m
- Number of employees: 3,000
- Website: stoneacre.co.uk

Stoneacre Motor Group is a car dealership group based in the United Kingdom, having been established in December 1994. The company started trading by acquiring Stoneacre in 1994, a used car dealership based in Scunthorpe that had gone bankrupt. Stoneacre offers new and used car sales, as well as many aftersales services such as car servicing and MOTs. In the year to April 2019, Stoneacre had registered a turnover of £982m on its way to a targeted turnover of over £1 billion come 2020, while pre-tax profits rose to £17m (a 25 per cent increase year over year).

== Acquisitions ==
In December 2014, Staffordshire-based Randles Motor Group, with a turnover of £30 million, was acquired by the company. Stoneacre followed this up with the acquisition of the Chesterfield-based Autoworld, an £80m-turnover group, in 2015. Stoneacre added Honda and Mitsubishi to its portfolio in 2017 through the acquisition of Gilder Group in Sheffield and Rotherham.

In 2018, the franchise dealership completed multiple purchases, starting with the acquisition of Chris Variava in Nottingham, before obtaining two showrooms from Burrows Motor Company in Sheffield. In March, Stoneacre completed the purchase of Platts Garage in Stafford, a dealership with multiple franchises. Later in the year, the purchase of Mill Garages North East was completed, a Volvo dealership with three showrooms in the North East and one in Harrogate (Knaresborough). Initially delayed by the COVID-19 pandemic, Stoneacre completed the buyout of Hodgson Motor Group in the summer of 2020, adding Toyota to its list of franchises and four additional showrooms in the North East.

== Aston Martin ==
In early 2015, Stoneacre opened a purpose-built, 14-car Aston Martin showroom at Newcastle's Silverlink Retail and Business Park. The opening night of the showroom saw the public debut of the DB11, which kick-started the Gaydon firm's 'Second Century' plan, with then Aston Martin CEO, Andy Palmer, also in attendance.

== Stoneacre Cup ==
June 2019 saw the inaugural Stoneacre Cup take place at the Keepmoat Stadium in Doncaster—Doncaster Rovers' home ground—organised through Stoneacre's sponsorship of the South Yorkshire football club. The aim of the Stoneacre Cup is to invite local primary schools in the Doncaster area to play in an inter-schools football tournament, with eight teams playing in this first running of the competition. The Covid outbreak halted plans for a second running in 2020.
