= 2022–23 Doncaster Rovers F.C. season =

Doncaster Rovers
2022–23 season
- Owner: Doncaster Rovers Ltd.
- Chairman: David Blunt
- Head Coach: Gary McSheffrey (until 17 October); Danny Schofield (from 20 October)
- Stadium: Keepmoat Stadium
- League Two: 18th
- FA Cup: First round
- EFL Cup: First round
- EFL Trophy: Group stage
Home colours	Away colours

The 2022–23 season is the 144th season in the existence of Doncaster Rovers Football Club and the club's first season back in League Two since the 2016–17 season following their relegation from League One last season. In addition to the league, they will also compete in the 2022–23 FA Cup, the 2022–23 EFL Cup and the 2022–23 EFL Trophy.

== Transfers ==
=== In ===
Date	Pos	Player	Transferred from	Fee	Ref
1 July 2022 (Note: The transfer was announced on 16 May, and would become official on July 1, once his Norwich City contract expired)	LB	(England) Freddie Allen	(England) Norwich City	Free Transfer	
1 July 2022 (Note: The transfer was announced on 19 May, and would become official on July 1, once his Fleetwood Town contract expired)	CM	(England) Harrison Biggins	(England) Fleetwood Town	Free Transfer	
1 July 2022 (Note: The transfer was announced on 20 June, and would become official on July 1, once his Barnsley contract expired)	CF	(England) George Miller	(England) Barnsley	Free Transfer	
1 July 2022 (Note: The transfer was announced on 21 June, and would become official on July 1, once his Hartlepool United contract expired)	AM	(England) Luke Molyneux	(England) Hartlepool United	Free Transfer	
17 July 2022	CB	(England) Adam Long	(England) Wigan Athletic	Undisclosed	
21 July 2022	LB	(Scotland) James Maxwell	(Scotland) Rangers	Free Transfer	
22 July 2022	LW	(England) Kyle Hurst	(England) Birmingham City	Undisclosed	
22 July 2022	SS	(England) Lee Tomlin	(England) Walsall	Free Transfer	
28 July 2022	AM	(England) Jack Degruchy	(England) York City	Free Transfer	
1 August 2022	FW	(England) Tavonga Kuleya	Unattached	Free Transfer	
24 January 2023	CF	(Northern Ireland) Caolan Lavery	(England) Scunthorpe United	Free Transfer	
24 March 2023	CM	(England) Zain Westbrooke	Free agent	—N/a	

=== Out ===
Date	Pos	Player	Transferred to	Fee	Ref
25 June 2022	LW	(England) Joe Dodoo	(England) Burton Albion	Mutual Consent	
28 June 2022	CB	(England) Ben Blythe	(Wales) Swansea City	Undisclosed	
28 June 2022	CF	(England) Jordy Hiwula	(Scotland) Ross County	Nominal	
30 June 2022	CM	(Trinidad and Tobago) John Bostock	(England) Notts County	Rejected Contract	
30 June 2022	GK	(England) Luke Chadwick	Unattached	Released	
30 June 2022	MF	(England) Corie Cole	Unattached	Released	
30 June 2022	CM	(England) Dan Gardner	(England) Oldham Athletic	Released	
30 June 2022	DF	(England) Thomas Henson	Unattached	Released	
30 June 2022	CM	(England) AJ Greaves	(England) York City	Released	
30 June 2022	CM	(England) Lirak Hasani	(England) Gateshead	Released	
30 June 2022	MF	(England) William Hollings	Unattached	Released	
30 June 2022	LB	(England) Branden Horton	(England) Chesterfield	Released	
30 June 2022	LB	(England) Cameron John	(England) Rochdale	Released	
30 June 2022	FW	(England) Tavonga Kuleya	Unattached	Released	
30 June 2022	DF	(England) Michael Nesbitt	Unattached	Released	
30 June 2022	CF	(Nigeria) Fejiri Okenabirhie	(England) Cambridge United	Released	
30 June 2022	CM	(England) Daniel Wilds	(England) Sunderland West End	Released	
30 June 2022	RM	(England) Ed Williams	(England) Chippenham Town	Released	
30 June 2022	FW	(England) Alex Wolny	Unattached	Released	
13 July 2022	CB	(Wales) Joe Wright	(Scotland) Kilmarnock	Free Transfer	
5 October 2022	SS	(England) Lee Tomlin	Retired		
13 January 2023	RB	(England) Kyle Knoyle	(England) Stockport County	Undisclosed	
19 January 2023	CM	(England) Adam Clayton	(England) Bradford City	Free Transfer	

=== Loans in ===
Date	Pos	Player	Loaned from	On loan until	Ref
8 July 2022	CF	(England) Josh Andrews	(England) Birmingham City	1 January 2023	
1 September 2022	CF	(England) Max Woltman	(England) Liverpool	16 January 2023 (Note: On 16 January, Woltman was recalled back to Liverpool)	
13 January 2023	RW	(England) Todd Miller	(England) Brighton & Hove Albion	End of Season	
17 January 2023	RB	(Republic of Ireland) James Brown	(England) Blackburn Rovers	End of Season	
17 January 2023	CB	(England) Ben Nelson	(England) Leicester City	End of Season	
27 January 2023	CM	(England) Charlie Lakin	(England) Burton Albion	End of Season	
18 March 2023	GK	(England) Stuart Moore	(England) Blackpool	25 March 2023	

=== Loans out ===
Date	Pos	Player	Loaned to	On loan until	Ref
12 August 2022	GK	(England) Ben Bottomley	(England) Lincoln United	12 September 2022	
12 September 2022	AM	(England) Jack Degruchy	(England) FC United of Manchester	12 October 2022	
12 September 2022	RW	(England) Tavonga Kuleya	(England) FC United of Manchester	12 October 2022	
16 September 2022	GK	(England) Ben Bottomley	(England) Tadcaster Albion	16 October 2022	
14 October 2022	CM	(Northern Ireland) Liam Ravenhill	(England) Blyth Spartans	14 November 2022	
17 November 2022	RW	(England) Tavonga Kuleya	(England) Worksop Town	End of Season (Note: On 16 December, Kuleya's loan at Worksop was extended until the end of the season.)	
16 December 2022	CB	(England) Bobby Faulkner	(England) Worksop Town	16 January 2023	
3 February 2023	CB	(England) Bobby Faulkner	(England) Spennymoor Town	20 March 2023 (Note: On 20 March, Faulkner was recalled back from his loan at Spennymoor)	
3 February 2023	CM	(Northern Ireland) Liam Ravenhill	(England) Spennymoor Town	3 March 2023	
6 March 2023	CF	(England) Reo Griffiths	(England) Yeovil Town	End of Season	

== Pre-season and friendlies ==
On 1 June, Doncaster Rovers appointed their pre-season schedule. Over a week later, a further friendly was confirmed against Huddersfield Town.

Win Draw Loss Fixtures

2 July 2022 Friendly	Armthorpe Welfare	0–2	Doncaster Rovers	Armthorpe
15:00 BST		Report	Miller (?); Goodman (?)	Stadium: Marra Falcons Stadium

9 July 2022 Friendly	Nuneaton Borough	0–2	Doncaster Rovers	Nuneaton
15:00 BST		Report	Miller 6'; Andrews 68'	Stadium: Liberty Way

13 July 2022 Friendly	Spennymoor Town	1–3	Doncaster Rovers	Spennymoor
19:00 BST	Anderson 7'	Report	Ravenhill 48'; Miller 65'; Williams 69'	Stadium: The Brewery Field

16 July 2022 Friendly	Doncaster Rovers	1–0	Huddersfield Town	Doncaster
15:00 BST	Trialist 70' (pen.)	Report		Stadium: Eco-Power Stadium

19 July 2022 Friendly	Doncaster Rovers	2–2	Rotherham United	Doncaster
19:00 BST	Miller 11', 58'	Report	Odoffin 16'; Kelly 77'	Stadium: Eco-Power Stadium

23 July 2022 Friendly	FC United of Manchester	0–3	Doncaster Rovers	Moston
15:00 BST		Report	Miller 43'; Biggins 59'; Andrews 79'	Stadium: Broadhurst Park

== Competitions ==
=== Overall record ===
Competition	First match	Last match	Starting round	Record							
Competition	First match	Last match	Starting round	Pld	W	D	L	GF	GA	GD	Win %
League Two	August 2022	May 2023	Matchday 1	0	0	0	0	0	0	+0	—
FA Cup	TBC	TBC	First round	0	0	0	0	0	0	+0	—
EFL Cup	TBC	TBC	First round	0	0	0	0	0	0	+0	—
EFL Trophy	TBC	TBC	Group stage	0	0	0	0	0	0	+0	—
Total				0	0	0	0	0	0	+0	—

Last updated: pre-season
Source: [ Soccerway]

=== League Two ===
==== League table ====
Pos	Team	Pld	W	D	L	GF	GA	GD	Pts
15	Newport County	46	14	15	17	53	56	−3	57
16	Walsall	46	12	19	15	46	49	−3	55
17	Gillingham	46	14	13	19	36	49	−13	55
18	Doncaster Rovers	46	16	7	23	46	65	−19	55
19	Harrogate Town	46	12	16	18	59	68	−9	52
20	Colchester United	46	12	13	21	44	51	−7	49
21	AFC Wimbledon	46	11	15	20	48	60	−12	48

Source: EFL Official Website
Rules for classification: 1) Points; 2) Goal difference; 3) Number of goals scored; 4) Head-to-head results; 5) Wins; 6) Away goals; 7) Penalty points (sec 9.5); 8) 12-point sending off offences

==== Results summary ====
Overall								Home						Away					
Pld	W	D	L	GF	GA	GD	Pts	W	D	L	GF	GA	GD	W	D	L	GF	GA	GD
45	16	7	22	45	63	−18	55	11	1	11	27	30	−3	5	6	11	18	33	−15

Last updated: 29 April 2023.
Source: [ Soccerway]

==== Results by round ====
Round	1	2	3	4	5	6	7	8	9	10	11	12	13	14	15	16	17	18	19	20	21	22	23	24	25	26	27	28	29	30	31	32	33	34	35	36	37	38	39	40	41	42	43	44	45
Ground	A	H	A	H	H	A	H	A	H	H	A	A	H	A	A	H	H	A	A	H	A	A	H	H	A	A	H	H	A	H	A	H	A	A	H	A	A	H	H	A	H	A	A	H	H
Result	D	W	D	W	W	W	L	L	L	W	W	L	D	L	D	L	W	W	L	L	W	L	W	W	L	L	L	W	W	W	L	L	D	L	W	L	D	L	L	L	L	D	L	L	W
Position	14	10	9	7	5	3	6	7	12	11	8	9	8	12	12	12	10	10	10	13	10	13	12	8	10	15	15	11	9	9	10	12	13	13	11	12	12	12	12	12	15	15	14	16	15

Updated to match(es) played on 29 April 2023. Source: [ Soccerway]
A = Away; H = Home; W = Win; D = Draw; L = Loss; P = Postponed

==== Matches ====
Win Draw Loss Fixtures

On 23 June, the league fixtures were announced.

30 July 2022 1	Bradford City	0–0	Doncaster Rovers	Bradford
15:00 BST	Harratt (red card) 90+8'	Report	Ravenhill (yellow card) 6'; Tomlin (yellow card) 45+5' (yellow-red card) 45+5'; Hurst (yellow card) 82'; Mitchell (yellow card) 89'	Stadium: Utilita Energy Stadium; Attendance: 19,368; Referee: Bobby Madden

6 August 2022 2	Doncaster Rovers	2–1	Sutton United	Doncaster
15:00 BST	Clayton (yellow card) 59'; Miller 90+2'; Agard 90+4'	Report	Wilson 16'; Kizzi (yellow card) 45'; Smith (yellow card) 67'; Bugiel (yellow card) 75'	Stadium: Eco-Power Stadium; Attendance: 5,720; Referee: Ben Speedie

13 August 2022 3	AFC Wimbledon	2–2	Doncaster Rovers	Wimbledon
15:00 BST	Maghoma (yellow card) 69'; Young-Coombes 76', 84'; Davison (yellow card) 86'	Report	Clayton (yellow card) 2'; Tomlin (yellow card) 39'; Anderson (yellow card) 56'; Williams (yellow card) 66', (goal) 90+4'; Rowe 86'	Stadium: The Cherry Red Records Stadium; Referee: Ollie Yates

16 August 2022 4	Doncaster Rovers	2–1	Stockport County	Doncaster
19:45 BST	Miller 35'; Agard 90+1'; Knoyle (yellow card) 90+5'	Report	Southam-Hales (red card) 21'; Rydel 46'; Crankshaw (yellow card) 86'; Jaroš (yellow card) 90'	Stadium: Eco-Power Stadium; Attendance: 6,309; Referee: Declan Bourne

20 August 2022 5	Doncaster Rovers	2–1	Salford City	Doncaster
15:00 BST	Hurst 45+1', 63'	Report	Thomas-Asante 10'; Hendry (yellow card) 41'; Lund (yellow card) 44'; Watt (yellow card) 90+9'	Stadium: Eco-Power Stadium; Attendance: 6,057; Referee: Andrew Kitchen

27 August 2022 6	Northampton Town	0–1	Doncaster Rovers	Northampton
15:00 BST	Hoskins (yellow card) 20'; McWilliams (yellow card) 56'	Report	Miller 69' (pen.); Mitchell (yellow card) 90+3'	Stadium: PTS Academy Stadium; Attendance: 5,515; Referee: Neil Hair

3 September 2022 7	Doncaster Rovers	1–3	Mansfield Town	Doncaster
15:00 BST	Tomlin 45+2', (yellow card) 66'	Report	Clarke 15', (yellow card) 86'; Maris 56'; Hawkins (yellow card) 61'; Akins 71' (pen.); Lapslie (yellow card) 83'	Stadium: Eco-Power Stadium; Attendance: 8,978; Referee: Thomas Kirk

10 September 2022	Hartlepool United	Postponed	Doncaster Rovers	Hartlepool
15:00 BST				Stadium: Suit Direct Stadium
Note: Fixture was postponed as a mark of respect following the passing of Queen Elizabeth II.

13 September 2022 8	Barrow	2–0	Doncaster Rovers	Barrow-in-Furness
19:45 BST	Kay (yellow card) 14'; Whitfield 37'; Warren 77'	Report	Clayton (yellow card) 34'; Tomlin (yellow card) 54'	Stadium: Furness Building Society Stadium; Attendance: 3,295; Referee: Scott Oldham

17 September 2022 9	Doncaster Rovers	0–1	Swindon Town	Doncaster
15:00 BST	Rowe (yellow card) 10'	Report	Baudry (yellow card) 45+2'; Wakeling 60'	Stadium: Eco-Power Stadium; Attendance: 6,446; Referee: Charles Breakspear

24 September 2022 10	Doncaster Rovers	4–1	Crawley Town	Doncaster
15:00 BST	Olowu 40'; Miller 59' (pen.), 67'; Hurst 83'	Report	Tilley (yellow card) 30', (goal) 42'	Stadium: Eco-Power Stadium; Attendance: 5,711; Referee: Carl Boyeson

1 October 2022 11	Rochdale	1–2	Doncaster Rovers	Rochdale
15:00 BST	Quigley 44'	Report	Agard 39'; Miller 68'; Williams (yellow card) 89'	Stadium: Spotland; Attendance: 3,264; Referee: Darren Drysdale

4 October 2022 12	Hartlepool United	2–1	Doncaster Rovers	Hartlepool
19:45 BST	Umerah 38'; McDonald 86'	Report	Faulkner 67'; Molyneux (yellow card) 80'	Stadium: Suit Direct Stadium; Attendance: 4,296; Referee: Andy Haines

8 October 2022 13	Doncaster Rovers	1–1	Leyton Orient	Doncaster
15:00 BST	Biggins 76'; Faulkner (yellow card) 90+1'	Report	Pratley (yellow card) 22'; Smyth 26'	Stadium: Eco-Power Stadium; Attendance: 6,314; Referee: Martin Woods

15 October 2022 14	Carlisle United	3–0	Doncaster Rovers	Carlisle
15:00 BST	Guy 44'; Huntington (yellow card) 47'; Stretton 53' 66'; Edmondson (penalty missed) 90+3'	Report	Clayton (yellow card) 26'; Williams (yellow card) 69'	Stadium: Brunton Park; Attendance: 5,600; Referee: Peter Wright

22 October 2022 15	Crewe Alexandra	1–1	Doncaster Rovers	Crewe
15:00 BST	Baker-Richardson 14' (yellow card) 45'; Offord (yellow card) 72'; Brook (yellow card) 83'	Report	Miller (penalty missed) 45+1' 77'	Stadium: Mornflake Stadium; Attendance: 4,099; Referee: Carl Brook

25 October 2022 16	Doncaster Rovers	0–1	Stevenage	Doncaster
19:45 BST	Anderson (yellow card) 76'; Clayton (yellow card) 90+4'	Report	Roberts 25'; James-Wildin (yellow card) 31'	Stadium: Eco-Power Stadium; Attendance: 5,690; Referee: Seb Stockbridge

29 October 2022 17	Doncaster Rovers	1–0	Gillingham	Doncaster
15:00 BST	Maxwell (yellow card) 9'; Biggins 60'	Report	Law (yellow card) 62'; O'Keefe (yellow card) 84'	Stadium: Eco-Power Stadium; Attendance: 5,800; Referee: Christopher Pollard

12 November 2022 18	Grimsby Town	1–3	Doncaster Rovers	Cleethorpes
15:00 GMT	Hunt (yellow card) 44'; Smith (yellow card) 45+1'; McAtee 79'; Glennon (yellow card) 86'	Report	Miller 6', 63'; Biggins 51'	Stadium: Blundell Park; Attendance: 8,046; Referee: Lewis Smith

19 November 2022 19	Colchester United	3–0	Doncaster Rovers	Colchester
15:00 GMT	Hannant (yellow card) 23' (goal) 89'; Newby 45+1'; Tovide 59'; Ashley (yellow card) 82'; Tchamadeu (yellow card) 85'	Report	Hurst (yellow card) 11'; Long (yellow card) 45'; Anderson (yellow card) 88'	Stadium: JobServe Community Stadium; Attendance: 3,607; Referee: Tom Nield

2 December 2022 20	Doncaster Rovers	0–2	Walsall	Doncaster
19:45 GMT		Report	Knowles 52'; Johnson 71'	Stadium: Eco-Power Stadium; Attendance: 6,110; Referee: Simon Mather

10 December 2022 21	Newport County	0–1	Doncaster Rovers	Newport
15:00 GMT		Report	Knoyle 58'; Maxwell (yellow card) 63'; Clayton (yellow card) 71'	Stadium: Rodney Parade; Attendance: 3,798; Referee: Adam Herczeg

17 December 2022	Doncaster Rovers	Postponed	Harrogate Town	Doncaster
15:00 GMT				Stadium: Eco-Power Stadium
Note: Fixture was postponed due to safety reasons regarding frozen areas of the pitch.

26 December 2022 22	Tranmere Rovers	3–0	Doncaster Rovers	Birkenhead
15:00 GMT	Bristow (yellow card) 43'; Hemmings 45'; Morris 59'; Lewis 77'	Report	Maxwell (yellow card) 33'; Anderson (yellow card) 59'	Stadium: Prenton Park; Attendance: 7,033; Referee: Anthony Backhouse

29 December 2022 23	Doncaster Rovers	4–3	Rochdale	Doncaster
19:45 GMT	Seaman 6'; Close 9'; Biggins 37'; Anderson 81'	Report	Rodney 14'; Williams 16' (o.g.); Ebanks-Landell (yellow card) 27'; Sinclair 77'	Stadium: The Eco-Power Stadium; Attendance: 6,025; Referee: Andrew Kitchen

1 January 2023 24	Doncaster Rovers	2–1	Carlisle United	Doncaster
15:00 GMT	Maxwell 5'; Seaman (yellow card) 12'; Hurst 67'	Report	Harris (yellow card) 58'; Dennis 87'	Stadium: The Eco-Power Stadium; Attendance: 7,143; Referee: Ben Speedie

7 January 2023 25	Leyton Orient	1–0	Doncaster Rovers	Leyton
15:00 GMT	Smyth (yellow card) 51'; Archibald 68'	Report	Anderson (yellow card) 62'	Stadium: Brisbane Road; Attendance: 7,404; Referee: Alan Young

14 January 2023	Crawley Town	Postponed	Doncaster Rovers	Crawley
15:00 GMT				Stadium: Broadfield Stadium
Note: Fixture was postponed due to a waterlogged pitch.

21 January 2023	Doncaster Rovers	Postponed	Tranmere Rovers	Doncaster
15:00 GMT				Stadium: Eco-Power Stadium
Note: Fixture was postponed on safety grounds.

28 January 2023 26	Mansfield Town	4–1	Doncaster Rovers	Mansfield
15:00 GMT	Anderson 1' (o.g.); Kilgour 26'; Clarke (yellow card) 45+1'; Reed (yellow card) 56'; Akins 60'; Swan 86'	Report	Anderson (yellow card) 45+7'; Hurst 53'; Miller (yellow card) 90+5'	Stadium: One Call Stadium; Attendance: 8,116; Referee: Thomas Parsons

4 February 2023 27	Doncaster Rovers	0–1	Hartlepool United	Doncaster
15:00 GMT	Williams (yellow card) 36'	Report	Pruti (yellow card) 54'; Dodds 88'; Kiernan (yellow card) 90+5'	Stadium: The Eco-Power Stadium; Attendance: 7,002; Referee: Sam Allison

7 February 2023 28	Doncaster Rovers	2–0	Tranmere Rovers	Doncaster
19:45 GMT	Lakin (yellow card) 34'; Close 62'; Hurst 65'	Report	Hendry (yellow card) 33'; Walker (yellow card) 66'; Turnbull (yellow card) 74'	Stadium: The Eco-Power Stadium; Attendance: 5,775; Referee: Andy Haines

11 February 2023 29	Swindon Town	0–2	Doncaster Rovers	Swindon
15:00 GMT	Iandolo (yellow card) 60'; Darcy (yellow card) 67'	Report	Lakin (yellow card) 35'; Anderson (yellow card) 45+1'; Brown (yellow card) 53'; Molyneux 71', 73'	Stadium: The County Ground; Attendance: 9,486; Referee: Ollie Yates

14 February 2023 30	Doncaster Rovers	1–0	Barrow	Doncaster
19:45 GMT	Maxwell 18', (yellow card) 57'	Report	Gotts (yellow card) 54'; Neal (yellow card) 90+6'	Stadium: The Eco-Power Stadium; Attendance: 5,496; Referee: Thomas Kirk

18 February 2023 31	Sutton United	2–0	Doncaster Rovers	Sutton
15:00 GMT	Rowe 49'; Dennis (yellow card) 81'; Ajiboye 88'	Report	Nelson (yellow card) 80'	Stadium: VBS Community Stadium; Attendance: 3,163; Referee: Darren Drysdale

25 February 2023 32	Doncaster Rovers	0–1	Bradford City	Doncaster
15:00 GMT	Olowu (yellow card) 36'; Hurst (yellow card) 60'	Report	Walker (yellow card) 6'; Clayton (yellow card) 11'; Costelloe (yellow card) 46'; Smallwood (yellow card) 60'; Cook 71'	Stadium: The Eco-Power Stadium; Attendance: 10,655; Referee: Sam Purkiss

5 March 2023 33	Stockport County	0–0	Doncaster Rovers	Edgeley
15:00 GMT	Davenport (yellow card) 9'; Rydel (yellow card) 65'	Report	Molyneux (yellow card) 81'; Close (yellow card) 90'	Stadium: Edgeley Park; Attendance: 9,942; Referee: Robert Lewis

7 March 2023 34	Doncaster Rovers	0–2	Harrogate Town	Doncaster
19:45 GMT	Close (yellow card) 57'	Report	Armstrong 81'; Pattison 84'	Stadium: The Eco-Power Stadium; Attendance: 5,777; Referee: David Rock

11 March 2023 35	Doncaster Rovers	2–1	AFC Wimbledon	Doncaster
15:00 GMT	Biggins 27'; Miller 32'; Seaman (yellow card) 34'; Nelson (yellow card) 90+6'	Report	Davison 18'	Stadium: The Eco-Power Stadium; Attendance: 5,998; Referee: Matthew Corlett

18 March 2023 36	Salford City	3–1	Doncaster Rovers	Kersal
15:00 GMT	Bolton 12', 59'; Mallan 38'; Galbraith (yellow card) 73'; Leak (yellow card) 90+3'	Report	Rowe (yellow card) 4'; Miller 14'	Stadium: The Peninsula Stadium; Attendance: 3,148; Referee: Neil Hair

21 March 2023 37	Crawley Town	1–1	Doncaster Rovers	Crawley
19:45 GMT	Ogungbo (yellow card) 60'; Khaleel 82'	Report	Anderson (yellow card) 9'; Brown (yellow card) 45'; Lavery 45+6'; Molyneux (yellow card) 90+3'; Close (yellow card) 90+6'	Stadium: Broadfield Stadium; Attendance: 2,850; Referee: Darren Handley

25 March 2023 38	Doncaster Rovers	0–2	Northampton Town	Doncaster
15:00 GMT	Anderson (yellow card) 38'; Miller (yellow card) 72'	Report	Pinnock 2'; Hoskins 52'; Sowerby (yellow card) 72'; Leonard (yellow card) 76'; Bowie (yellow card) 80'	Stadium: The Eco-Power Stadium; Attendance: 6,469; Referee: Adam Herczeg

1 April 2023 39	Doncaster Rovers	0–2	Crewe Alexandra	Doncaster
15:00 BST		Report	Baker-Richardson 31'; O'Riordan 37'	Stadium: The Eco-Power Stadium; Attendance: 5,993; Referee: Ross Joyce

7 April 2023 40	Gillingham	1–0	Doncaster Rovers	Gillingham
15:00 BST	Nichols 44'	Report	Barlow (yellow card) 88'	Stadium: MEMS Priestfield Stadium; Attendance: 6,842; Referee: Dean Whitestone

10 April 2023 41	Doncaster Rovers	1–2	Grimsby Town	Doncaster
15:00 BST	Barlow 26'; Mitchell (yellow card) 77'	Report	Waterfall (yellow card) 13'; Smith (yellow card) 28'; Taylor (yellow card) 45+3'; Glennon (yellow card) 79'; Clifton (yellow card) 81'; Maher 85'; Green (yellow card) 90+1'; Lloyd 90+6'	Stadium: Eco-Power Stadium; Attendance: 8,620; Referee: Alan Young

15 April 2023 42	Harrogate Town	2–2	Doncaster Rovers	Harrogate
15:00 BST	Sims (yellow card) 39'; Armstrong 50'; Eastman 60'	Report	Ravenhill (yellow card) 12'; Barlow 34'; Molyneux 47'	Stadium: The EnviroVent Stadium; Attendance: 3,014; Referee: Bobby Madley

18 April 2023 43	Stevenage	1–0	Doncaster Rovers	Stevenage
19:45 BST	Roberts 13'; James-Wildin (yellow card) 63'; Rose (yellow card) 84'; Reid (yellow card) 90+5'	Report	Faulkner (yellow card) 77'	Stadium: The Lamex Stadium; Attendance: 2,990; Referee: Craig Hicks

22 April 2023 44	Doncaster Rovers	1–3	Newport County	Doncaster
15:00 BST	Hurst 12'; Ravenhill (yellow card) 35'; Biggins (yellow card) 89'	Report	Lewis (yellow card) 17'; Norman (yellow card) 30', (goal) 79'; Moriah-Welsh (yellow card) 50'; Evans (yellow card) 60'; Farquharson 64'; Wildig 71'	Stadium: The Eco-Power Stadium; Attendance: 5,490; Referee: Simon Mather

29 April 2023 45	Doncaster Rovers	1–0	Colchester United	Doncaster
15:00 BST	Rowe 30'; Williams (yellow card) 35'	Report	Chilvers (yellow card) 35'; Akinde (yellow card) 45+2'; Tchamadeu (yellow card) 90+6'; Ben Garner (yellow card) off the pitch'	Stadium: Eco-Power Stadium; Attendance: 5,928; Referee: Sunny Gill

8 May 2023 46	Walsall	2–1	Doncaster Rovers	Bescot
12:30 BST	Wilkinson 57'; Hutchinson 74'	Report	Faulkner 84'	Stadium: Bescot Stadium; Attendance: 7,176; Referee: Farai Hallam

=== FA Cup ===
Doncaster were drawn at home against King's Lynn Town in the first round.

Win Draw Loss Fixtures

5 November 2022 First round	Doncaster Rovers	0–1	King's Lynn Town	Doncaster
15:00 GMT		Report	Crowther (yellow card) 39'; Omotayo 83'	Stadium: Eco-Power Stadium; Attendance: 3,965; Referee: Geoff Eltringham

=== EFL Cup ===
Win Draw Loss Fixtures

Rovers were drawn at home to Lincoln City in the first round.

9 August 2022 First round	Doncaster Rovers	0–3	Lincoln City	Doncaster
19:45 BST	Ravenhill (yellow card) 45+1'	Report	Kendall 12'; Bishop 47'; Scully 61'	Stadium: Eco-Power Stadium; Attendance: 4,006; Referee: Anthony Backhouse

=== EFL Trophy ===
On 20 June, the initial Group stage draw was made, grouping Doncaster Rovers with Barnsley and Lincoln City. Three days later, Newcastle United U21s joined Northern Group E.

Pos	Div	Team	Pld	W	PW	PL	L	GF	GA	GD	Pts	Qualification
1	L1	Lincoln City	3	2	0	0	1	6	2	+4	6	Advance to Round 2
2	L1	Barnsley	3	2	0	0	1	6	5	+1	6	Advance to Round 2
3	L2	Doncaster Rovers	3	1	1	0	1	4	5	−1	5	
4	ACA	Newcastle United U21	3	0	0	1	2	0	4	−4	1	

Source: EFL.com

Win Draw Loss Fixtures

30 August 2022 Group stage	Doncaster Rovers	0–0 (4–2 p)	Newcastle United U21s	Doncaster
19:00 BST		Report	White (yellow card) 6'	Stadium: Eco-Power Stadium; Attendance: 1,685; Referee: James Oldham
	Penalties
	Hurst (penalty scored); Seaman (penalty scored); Long (penalty scored); Agard (penalty scored)		Savage (penalty scored); Crossley (penalty scored); Turner-Cook (penalty missed); Murphy (penalty missed)

20 September 2022 Group stage	Lincoln City	1–2	Doncaster Rovers	Lincoln
19:00 BST	Vernam 49'	Report	Molyneux (yellow card) 13'; Close (yellow card) 34'; Biggins (yellow card) 37'; Hurst 72'; Long 84'	Stadium: LNER Stadium; Attendance: 2,338; Referee: Adam Herczeg

11 October 2022 Group stage	Doncaster Rovers	2–4	Barnsley	Doncaster
19:00 BST	Taylor (yellow card) 15'; Anderson (yellow card) 39'; Miller 73' 81'	Report	Martin 11' 34'; Connell (yellow card) 15'; Jalo 20' 26'; Tedić (penalty missed) 40'	Stadium: Eco-Power Stadium; Attendance: 2,479; Referee: Marc Edwards
