= Adam Long =

Adam Long may refer to:

- Adam Long (British actor) (born 1991)
- Adam Long (American actor), American actor and playwright
- Adam Long (footballer) (born 2000)
- Adam Long (golfer) (born 1987)
