= Aidan Barlow =

English footballer (born 2000)

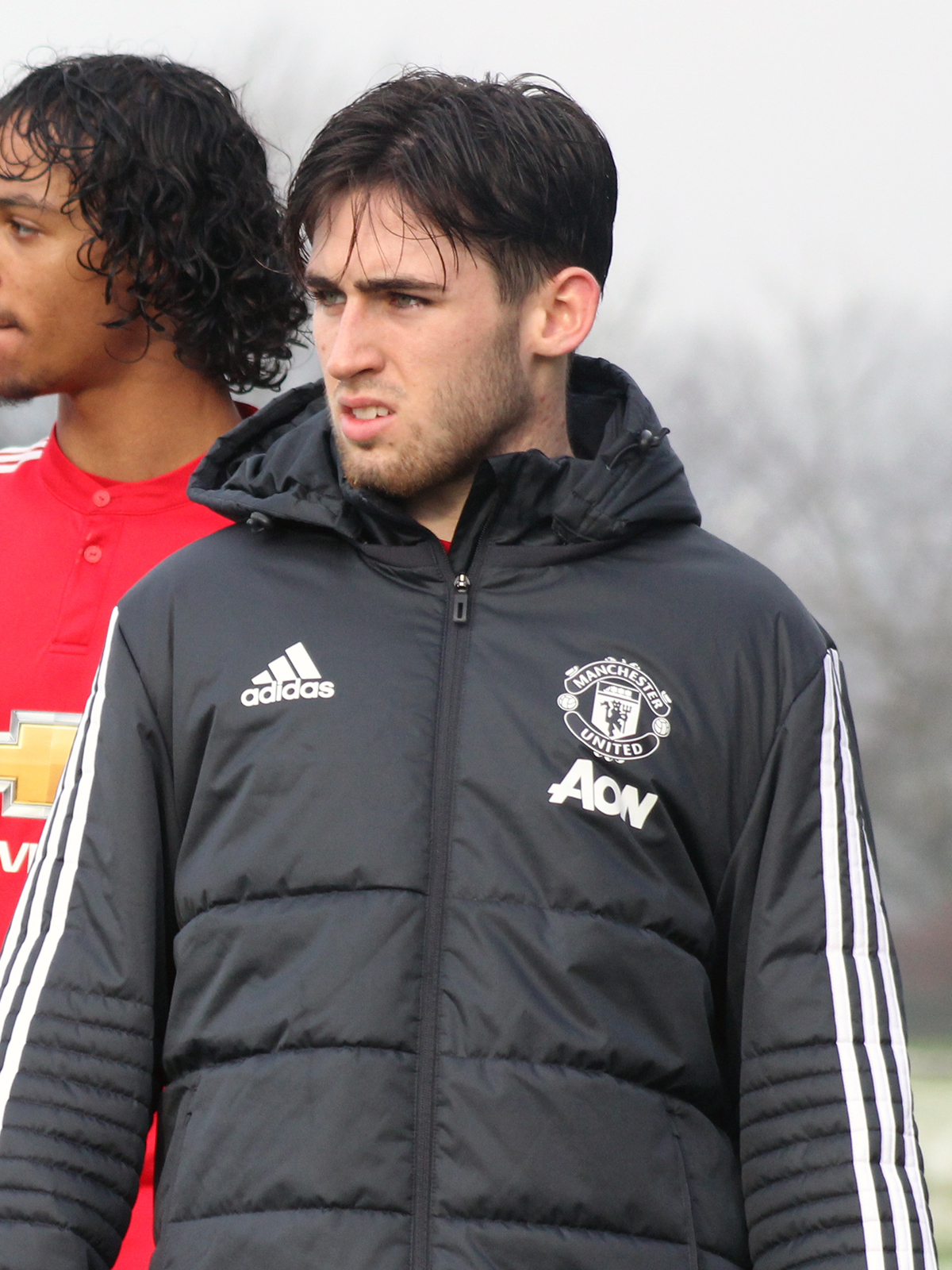
- Barlow in 2017

Personal information
- Full name: Aidan Will Barlow
- Date of birth: 10 January 2000 (age 26)
- Place of birth: Salford, England
- Height: 5 ft 9 in (1.76 m)
- Position: Left midfielder

Team information
- Current team: Rochdale
- Number: 18

Youth career
- 2006–2020: Manchester United

Senior career*
Years	Team	Apps	(Gls)
2019–2020	Manchester United	0	(0)
2019	→ Tromsø (loan)	7	(2)
2021–2023	Doncaster Rovers	43	(3)
2023–2024	Eastleigh	19	(1)
2024–	Rochdale	41	(7)

International career
2017	England U17	3	(1)
2017	England U18	1	(0)
- * Club domestic league appearances and goals as of 18 September 2025

Aidan Will Barlow (born 10 January 2000) is an English professional footballer who plays as a left midfielder for National League club Altrincham F.C.

== Club career ==
=== Manchester United ===
Barlow is a product of the Manchester United academy, having joined at the age of six. He made his first appearance at under-18 level in a defeat to Liverpool in 2014–15, prior to making the step up to under-23 football; he also featured for the under-19s in the UEFA Youth League. Barlow signed his first professional contract in December 2017.

On 13 August 2019, Barlow was loaned to Eliteserien side Tromsø until the end of the Norwegian season. He made his professional debut in Norway's top flight on 18 August, featuring for 76 minutes of a fixture with Lillestrøm. His first senior goal arrived in his third game, as he scored against Haugesund on 1 September. After a further goal versus Sarpsborg 08, he returned to his parent club on 3 December.

On 25 June 2020, it was announced that Barlow would leave Manchester United upon the expiration of his contract five days later. In September 2020, he went on trial at Stoke City, playing three games for their U23 side. In November 2020, he appeared for Ipswich Town's U23 side as a trialist.

=== Doncaster Rovers ===
He went on another trial at Doncaster Rovers in July 2021, and signed a one-year contract with the club on 28 July 2021. Following relegation to League Two, Barlow signed a further one-year contract extension in May 2022 with the option for a following year.

=== Eastleigh ===
On 4 July 2023, Barlow signed for National League club Eastleigh. He departed the club upon the expiration of his contract at the end of the 2023–24 season.

=== Rochdale ===
On 1 July 2024, Barlow signed a one-year contract with Rochdale. On 18 May 2026, the club announced it was releasing him.

=== Altrincham ===
On June 6th 2026 Altrincham signed Barlow after his contract at Rochdale had expired.

== International career ==
In May 2017, Barlow represented England at the UEFA Under-17 Championship in Croatia. He scored on his first appearance in the competition, netting in a 4–0 victory over Ukraine on 7 May. Barlow appeared in three of England's six games as they finished as runners-up to Spain. In the following September, Barlow played for the U18s in a friendly against South Africa U20s.

== Career statistics ==
As of 10 April 2023.

Appearances and goals by club, season and competition
Club	Season	League			Cup		League Cup		Continental		Other		Total	
Club	Season	Division	Apps	Goals	Apps	Goals	Apps	Goals	Apps	Goals	Apps	Goals	Apps	Goals
Manchester United	2019–20	Premier League	0	0	0	0	0	0	0	0	0	0	0	0
Tromsø (loan)	2019	Eliteserien	7	2	0	0	—		—		0	0	7	2
Doncaster Rovers	2021–22	League One	28	1	2	0	2	0	—		2 (Note: Appearance(s) in EFL Trophy)	0	34	1
Doncaster Rovers	2022-23	League Two	13	2	0	0	0	0	—		2	0	15	2
Eastleigh	2023–24	National League	19	1	1	0	—		—		1 (Note: Appearance(s) in FA Trophy)	0	21	1
Career total			67	6	3	0	2	0	0	0	5	0	77	6

== Honours ==
Rochdale

- National League play-offs: 2026
