= Reo Griffiths =

English footballer (born 2000)

Personal information
- Full name: Reo Revaldo Griffiths
- Date of birth: 27 June 2000 (age 26)
- Place of birth: Highgate, England
- Height: 1.80 m (5 ft 11 in)
- Position: Forward

Team information
- Current team: Haringey Borough

Youth career
- 2015–2018: Tottenham Hotspur
- 2018: Lyon

Senior career*
Years	Team	Apps	(Gls)
2018–2022	Lyon II	34	(13)
2022–2023	Doncaster Rovers	20	(2)
2023	→ Yeovil Town (loan)	6	(0)
2024	Wealdstone	0	(0)
2024–2025	Portland Timbers 2	14	(4)
2025–2026	AFC Croydon Athletic	1	(0)
2026–	Haringey Borough	17	(8)

International career^{‡}
2017	England U17	1	(0)
- * Club domestic league appearances and goals as of 12:12, 29 October 2025 (UTC) ‡ National team caps and goals as of 09:40, 2 February 2022 (UTC)

Reo Revaldo Griffiths (born 27 June 2000) is an English footballer who plays as a forward for Haringey Borough.

== Club career ==
Griffiths started his career with Tottenham Hotspur, scoring 33 goals for the club's under–18 side in the 2017–18 season. In the summer of 2018, refusing to sign professional with Tottenham, he was courted by many clubs, such as RB Leipzig, Real Madrid, Barcelona and PSG. On 1 August 2018, he joined Lyon on a four-year deal. He spent three and a half years with Lyon, largely playing for the club's B team in the Championnat National 2.

On 31 January 2022, Griffiths signed for League One side Doncaster Rovers for an undisclosed fee, in a two-and-a-half-year deal. A day later, he made his professional debut as a second-half substitute in a 5–0 loss to Rotherham United.

On 6 March 2023, Griffiths joined National League side Yeovil Town on loan until the end of the season. On 10 November 2023, his contract at Doncaster was cancelled by mutual consent. In January 2024, it was reported that Griffiths was playing Sunday league football in the Essex Corinthian League for Critics FC.

In March 2024, Griffiths signed for National League club Wealdstone.

After one match in the FA Trophy for Wealdstone, Griffiths joined MLS Next Pro club Portland Timbers 2 in April 2024. The following month, he was ruled out for the season after undergoing surgery on his achilles. Despite not making an appearance for Portland during the season, he signed a new six-month contract in November 2024. On 2 July 2025, he was released by the club at the end of his contract.

In October 2025, Griffiths joined Isthmian League South East Division club AFC Croydon Athletic.

== International career ==
In May 2017, Griffiths made his debut for England U17 as a late substitute in a 3–1 win over Norway U17.

== Career statistics ==
As of match played 28 October 2025

Appearances and goals by club, season and competition
Club	Season	League			FA Cup		EFL Cup		Other		Total	
Club	Season	Division	Apps	Goals	Apps	Goals	Apps	Goals	Apps	Goals	Apps	Goals
Tottenham Hotspur U23	2017–18	—			—		—		1 (Note: Appearance(s) in EFL Trophy)	0	1	0
Lyon II	2018–19	National 2	8	1	—		—		—		8	1
Lyon II	2019–20	National 2	16	6	—		—		—		16	6
Lyon II	2020–21	National 2	9	6	—		—		—		9	6
Lyon II	2021–22	National 2	1	0	—		—		—		1	0
Lyon II	Total		34	13	—		—		—		34	13
Doncaster Rovers	2021–22	League One	16	2	0	0	0	0	0	0	16	2
Doncaster Rovers	2022–23	League Two	4	0	0	0	0	0	1	0	5	0
Doncaster Rovers	2023–24	League Two	0	0	0	0	0	0	0	0	0	0
Doncaster Rovers	Total		20	2	0	0	0	0	1	0	21	2
Yeovil Town (loan)	2022–23	National League	6	0	—		—		—		6	0
Wealdstone	2023–24	National League	0	0	—		—		1 (Note: Appearance in FA Trophy)	0	1	0
Portland Timbers 2	2024	MLS Next Pro	14	4	—		—		—		14	4
AFC Croydon Athletic	2025–26	Isthmian League South East Division	1	0	0	0	—		1 (Note: Appearance(s) in Alan Turvey Trophy)	0	2	0
Career total			75	19	0	0	0	0	4	0	79	19
