= Liam Ravenhill =

English footballer (born 2002)

Personal information
- Full name: Liam Thomas Ravenhill
- Date of birth: 28 November 2002 (age 23)
- Place of birth: Doncaster, England
- Position: Midfielder

Team information
- Current team: Matlock Town

Youth career
- 2011–2021: Doncaster Rovers

Senior career*
Years	Team	Apps	(Gls)
2021–2024	Doncaster Rovers	12	(0)
2021	→ Mickleover (loan)	7	(0)
2021	→ AFC Telford United (loan)	3	(0)
2022	→ Blyth Spartans (loan)	4	(0)
2023	→ Spennymoor Town (loan)	1	(0)
2024–2025	Buxton	27	(0)
2025–	Matlock Town	0	(0)
- * Club domestic league appearances and goals as of 17:07, 18 February 2025 (UTC)

Liam Thomas Ravenhill (born 28 November 2002) is an English professional footballer who plays as a midfielder for Northern Premier League Division One East club Matlock Town.

== Club career ==
After joining the Doncaster Rovers academy in 2011, Ravenhill started a two-year scholarship with the club in 2019, and appeared for the club's first-team in pre-season friendlies ahead of the 2020–21 season. He made his professional debut on 7 November 2020 in a 5–1 FA Cup win over FC United of Manchester, and played again three days later in a 2–1 EFL Trophy defeat to Wolverhampton Wanderers U21.

Ravenhill signed a two-year professional contract with the club in June 2021. In September 2021, Ravenhill joined Mickleover on a one-month loan. He made seven appearances over the loan spell. On 22 October 2021, he joined National League North club AFC Telford United on a one-month loan, where he made three appearances. He made his league debut as a substitute in a 1–0 win over Shrewsbury Town on 11 December 2021.

In February 2022 he returned to Mickleover on loan.

On 14 October 2022, Ravenhill joined National League North club Blyth Spartans on a one-month loan deal.

On 15 May 2024, Doncaster announced he would be released in the summer when his contract expired.

In February 2025, Ravenhill joined Northern Premier League Premier Division side Matlock Town on a one-and-a-half year deal.

== International career ==
Ravenhill was called up to the Northern Ireland U21 squad for the first time in October 2020.

== Personal life ==
He is the son of former professional footballer Ricky Ravenhill.

== Career statistics ==
As of match played 7 April 2023

Appearances and goals by club, season and competition
Club	Season	League			FA Cup		EFL Cup		Other		Total	
Club	Season	Division	Apps	Goals	Apps	Goals	Apps	Goals	Apps	Goals	Apps	Goals
Doncaster Rovers	2020–21	League One	0	0	1	0	0	0	1 (Note: Appearance(s) in EFL Trophy)	0	2	0
Doncaster Rovers	2021–22	League One	3	0	1	0	0	0	0	0	4	0
Doncaster Rovers	2022–23	League Two	6	0	0	0	1	0	3	0	10	0
Doncaster Rovers	Total		9	0	2	0	1	0	4	0	16	0
Mickleover Sports (loan)	2021–22	Northern Premier League Premier Division	7	0	0	0	—		0	0	7	0
AFC Telford United (loan)	2021–22	National League North	3	0	0	0	—		0	0	3	0
Blyth Spartans (loan)	2022–23	National League North	4	0	0	0	—		0	0	4	0
Spennymoor Town (loan)	2022–23	National League North	1	0	0	0	—		0	0	1	0
Career total			24	0	2	0	0	0	4	0	31	0
