= Charlie Seaman =

English footballer

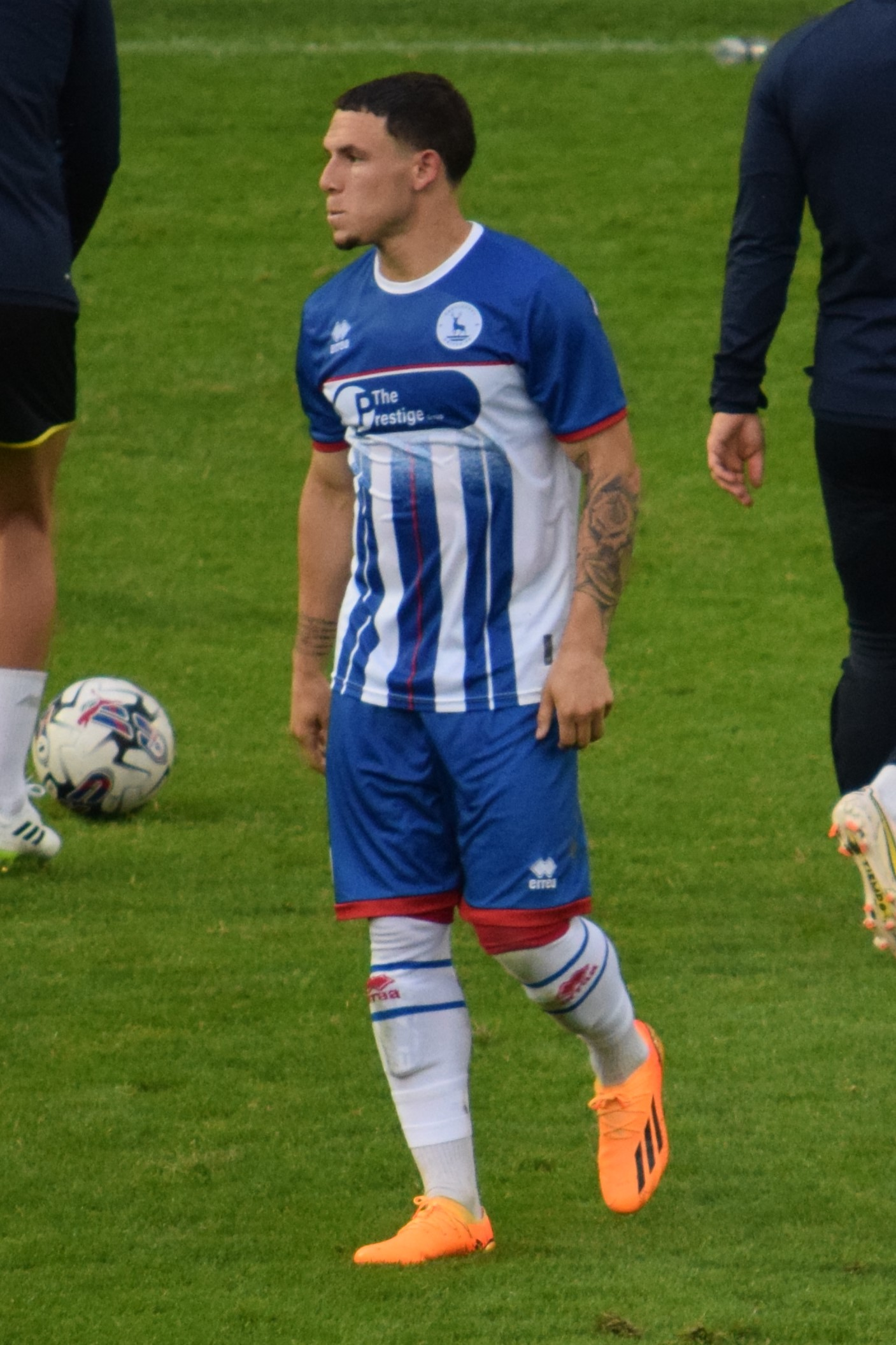
- Seaman playing for Hartlepool United in 2023

Personal information
- Full name: Charlie Martin Seaman
- Date of birth: 30 September 1999 (age 27)
- Place of birth: Waltham Forest, England
- Position: Right back

Team information
- Current team: Ebbsfleet United

Youth career
- West Ham United
- 2016–2018: AFC Bournemouth

Senior career*
Years	Team	Apps	(Gls)
2017–2020	AFC Bournemouth	0	(0)
2017	→ Weymouth (loan)	4	(1)
2019	→ Dundee United (loan)	10	(0)
2019–2020	→ Eastleigh (loan)	18	(0)
2020	→ Maidstone United (loan)	1	(0)
2020–2024	Doncaster Rovers	31	(2)
2020–2021	→ Maidstone United (loan)	11	(3)
2023–2024	→ Hartlepool United (loan)	16	(2)
2024	→ Wealdstone (loan)	7	(0)
2024–2025	Maidstone United	41	(4)
2025–	Ebbsfleet United	44	(6)
- * Club domestic league appearances and goals as of 14:37, 22 May 2026 (UTC)

Charlie Martin Seaman (born 30 September 1999) is an English professional footballer who plays as a right back for National League South club Ebbsfleet United.

== Playing career ==
Seaman began his career as a youth player at West Ham United. He was released in 2016 and joined AFC Bournemouth, playing initially in their under-18 team. He joined Weymouth in the Southern League on a youth loan in November 2017, scoring on his debut against Kings Langley.

He signed his first professional contract with Bournemouth in 2018. In January 2019, he was loaned to Scottish Championship club Dundee United until the end of the 2018–19 season. He made his debut in a 1–0 defeat against Ayr United.

Seaman was on trial with EFL League Two club Exeter City in July 2019, playing in a pre-season friendly against Taunton Town. In September 2019, Bournemouth loaned him to Eastleigh in the National League until the following January. After making 24 appearances for Eastleigh, he returned to Bournemouth having been ruled out for the next three months with a hamstring injury. Seaman went on loan again at the end of the January 2020 transfer window, joining Maidstone United in National League South until the end of the 2019–20 season. They were willing to sign him while he was still recovering from injury, as it was at no cost to the club. He made his Maidstone debut as a substitute against Eastbourne Borough on 14 March, just prior to football being suspended due to the coronavirus pandemic.

Seaman was released by Bournemouth at the end of his contract in June 2020. On 1 October 2020, he joined League One club Doncaster Rovers on a one-year contract and was subsequently loaned out to Maidstone United. He returned to Doncaster for the remainder of the 2020–21 season as the regional National League season at Maidstone was cancelled.

On 27 July 2023, Seaman joined National League side Hartlepool United on a season-long loan. On 5 January 2024, his loan spell was terminated by mutual consent after Seaman had made 16 appearances and scored twice for Hartlepool. On 19 January 2024, he signed for National League side Wealdstone until the end of the 2023–24 season.

On 15 May 2024, Doncaster announced he would be released in the summer when his contract expired.

On 4 June 2024, Seaman returned to Maidstone United on a permanent basis having had two previous loan spells with the club.

In June 2025, Seaman joined recently relegated National League South side Ebbsfleet United.

== Career statistics ==
As of match played 25 April 2026

Appearances and goals by club, season and competition
Club	Season	League			FA Cup		EFL Cup		Other		Total	
Club	Season	Division	Apps	Goals	Apps	Goals	Apps	Goals	Apps	Goals	Apps	Goals
AFC Bournemouth	2018–19	Premier League	0	0	0	0	0	0	0	0	0	0
AFC Bournemouth	2019–20	Premier League	0	0	0	0	0	0	0	0	0	0
AFC Bournemouth	2020–21	Championship	0	0	0	0	0	0	0	0	0	0
AFC Bournemouth	Total		0	0	0	0	0	0	0	0	0	0
Dundee United (loan)	2018–19	Scottish Championship	10	0	2	0	0	0	0	0	12	0
Eastleigh (loan)	2019–20	National League	18	0	6	0	0	0	1 (Note: Appearance(s) in FA Trophy)	1	25	1
Maidstone United (loan)	2019–20	National League South	1	0	0	0	0	0	0	0	1	0
Maidstone United (loan)	2020–21	National League South	12	3	0	0	0	0	2	0	14	3
Maidstone United (loan)	Total		13	3	0	0	0	0	2	0	15	3
Doncaster Rovers	2020–21	League One	0	0	0	0	0	0	0	0	0	0
Doncaster Rovers	2021–22	League One	14	1	0	0	1	0	2 (Note: Appearance(s) in EFL Trophy)	0	17	1
Doncaster Rovers	2022–23	League Two	20	1	0	0	1	0	3	0	24	1
Doncaster Rovers	Total		34	2	0	0	2	0	5	0	41	2
Hartlepool United (loan)	2023–24	National League	16	2	0	0	0	0	0	0	16	2
Wealdstone (loan)	2023–24	National League	7	0	0	0	0	0	0	0	7	0
Maidstone United	2024–25	National League South	41	4	4	0	0	0	3	0	48	4
Ebbsfleet United	2025–26	National League South	44	6	4	1	0	0	2	0	50	7
Career total			183	17	16	1	2	0	13	1	214	19
