= Rodrigo Vilca =

Peruvian footballer (born 1999)

Personal information
- Full name: Rodrigo Gary Vilca Betetta
- Date of birth: 12 March 1999 (age 27)
- Place of birth: Callao, Lima, Peru
- Height: 1.75 m (5 ft 9 in)
- Position: Midfielder

Team information
- Current team: Comerciantes Unidos
- Number: 25

Youth career
- San Vicente
- Blue Rays
- Sporting Diez
- Sporting Cristal
- 2013–2016: Universidad César Vallejo
- 2017–2018: Deportivo Municipal

Senior career*
Years	Team	Apps	(Gls)
2018–2020	Deportivo Municipal	27	(4)
2020–2024	Newcastle United	0	(0)
2021	→ Doncaster Rovers (loan)	10	(1)
2022	→ Universitario (loan)	22	(1)
2023–2024	→ Voždovac (loan)	16	(2)
2025	Atlético Grau	23	(2)
2026–	Comerciantes Unidos	26	(5)

International career^{‡}
2025–	Peru	6	(0)
- * Club domestic league appearances and goals as of 12 September 2026 ‡ National team caps and goals as of 14 November 2026

Rodrigo Gary Vilca Betetta (born 12 March 1999) is a Peruvian footballer who plays as a midfielder for Comerciantes Unidos and the Peru national team.

== Early life ==
Born in Callao in the Lima metropolitan area of Peru, Vilca emigrated to Spain at the age of three.

== Club career ==
=== Early career ===
Having played youth football in Spain with San Vicente in Albacete, and also training in the academy of former footballer José Zalazar, his father decided to return to Peru, taking Vilca with him, in 2010. Having settled in Gambetta, Callao, Vilca began his career in Peru with a team named Blue Rays in Rímac. From there he moved on to Sporting Diez, and began training with professional side Sporting Cristal on a monthly basis. After a four-year spell with Universidad César Vallejo, Vilca joined the academy of Deportivo Municipal at the age of seventeen.

Having suffered two fractures, to his foot in 2017 and to his collarbone the following year, Vilca made his professional debut for Deportivo Municipal in the final game of the 2018 season, starting in a 2–0 loss to Sport Huancayo. He began to establish himself in the following season, and was set to become a key player for the team in 2020, before the effects of the COVID-19 pandemic in Peru led to a five-month hiatus of the league.

=== Newcastle United ===
In September 2020, it was reported by English newspaper the Daily Mail that Vilca was close to signing with Premier League side Newcastle United. The following month, on 5 October, this transfer was confirmed by Newcastle United, with Vilca signing a four-year deal. He began training with the first-team squad immediately, in part because of absences due to the COVID-19 pandemic. On 19 October, he made his debut with Newcastle's under-23 side, starting against Fulham in the Premier League 2, before scoring his first goal for the youth side in a 3–2 loss to Reading on 30 October.

==== Loan to Doncaster Rovers ====
The following season, after three appearances for Newcastle's under-21 side, Vilca joined EFL League One side Doncaster Rovers on 31 August 2021, signing a short-term loan deal until January. He was immediately integrated into the first team, and made his debut as a starter a week after joining; playing at left-wing in an EFL Trophy tie against Rotherham United, he was replaced in the second half by Dan Gardner as Doncaster Rovers lost 6–0 on 7 September.

He scored his first and only goal for the club on 23 October 2021; having started in an EFL League One fixture against Cheltenham Town, he received a pass from Ben Close before skipping past a Cheltenham Town defender and finishing past goalkeeper Scott Flinders as Doncaster Rovers went on to win 3–2. His loan ended at the end of 2021, with Vilca thanking fans for their support and wishing the club well for the rest of the season.

==== Loan to Universitario ====
On 11 March 2022, having briefly returned to Newcastle's under-21 side, Vilca was loaned to Universitario in his native Peru until the end of the 2022 season. He made his debut the following day, coming on as a second-half substitute for Hernán Novick in an eventual 1–1 draw with Cienciano. He was criticised by media in Peru for missing what was seen as a good chance to make the score 2–1 to Universitario. On 10 April he was sent off for a stamp on Ayacucho midfielder Juan Morales in Universitario's 2–1 win.

He scored his first goal for the club on 24 July 2022, as Universitario beat Carlos Stein 2–0 in the Liga 1. Following Universitario's 2–0 away win against Alianza Lima on 4 September 2022, Vilca, as well as physio Guido Thompson, were hit by objects thrown by Alianza fans from the stands. Universitario issued a statement following the incident, requesting punishment for their opponents.

Vilca was criticised by sports journalist Erick Osores following Universitario's 0–0 draw with Sporting Cristal on 9 October 2022, with Osores stating that Vilca should not have come on as a substitute because he is a "ghost", alluding to a perceived inability to have an impact on the match. This would prove to be his last game for the club, as the following month Universitario announced that Vilca would be returning to Newcastle, and would not be part of the squad the following season.

==== Loan to Voždovac ====
Vilca returned once again to Newcastle, featuring in a number of games for their under-21 squad as an over-age player, in early 2023. In June of the same year, he was linked with a move back to Spain, and was reportedly close to joining Albacete. Instead, he moved on a season-long loan to Serbian SuperLiga side FK Voždovac on 5 September 2023. After the end of this loan, in June 2024, Newcastle informed that Vilca's contract would not be extended, and he became a free agent.

=== Atlético Grau ===
On 5 December 2024, Liga 1 club Atlético Grau announced that Vilca would be signing for them ahead of the 2025 season. He scored his first goal in Grau's 1–0 win against Ayacucho on 8 February 2025. In May 2025, he was linked with a move to Alianza Lima.

=== Comerciantes Unidos ===
In late December 2025, Vilca agreed a deal with Comerciantes Unidos.

== International career ==
Vilca was called up to the Peruvian under-18 side for a microcycle in 2017. Despite his good form at club level, he missed out on a place in the Peruvian Olympic Team ahead of the 2020 CONMEBOL Pre-Olympic Tournament due to the form of fellow right-wingers Kevin Quevedo, Kevin Sandoval and Fernando Pacheco.

== Career statistics ==
=== Club ===
As of 12 September 2026

Appearances and goals by club, season and competition
Club	Season	League			Cup (Note: Includes Copa Perú, FA Cup and Serbian Cup)		League Cup		Continental		Other		Total	
Club	Season	Division	Apps	Goals	Apps	Goals	Apps	Goals	Apps	Goals	Apps	Goals	Apps	Goals
Deportivo Municipal	2018	Liga 1	1	0	0	0	—		0	0	0	0	1	0
Deportivo Municipal	2019	Liga 1	13	1	0	0	—		0	0	0	0	13	1
Deportivo Municipal	2020	Liga 1	13	3	0	0	—		0	0	0	0	13	3
Deportivo Municipal	Total		27	4	0	0	—		0	0	0	0	27	4
Newcastle United	2020–21	Premier League	0	0	0	0	0	0	—		0	0	0	0
Newcastle United	2021–22	Premier League	0	0	0	0	0	0	—		0	0	0	0
Newcastle United	Total		0	0	0	0	0	0	0	0	0	0	0	0
Newcastle United U21	2020–21	—	—		—		—		—		1 (Note: Appearances in EFL Trophy)	0	1	0
Doncaster Rovers (loan)	2021–22	League One	10	1	0	0	0	0	–		2	0	12	1
Universitario (loan)	2022	Liga 1	22	1	0	0	—		0	0	0	0	22	1
Voždovac (loan)	2023–24	Serbian SuperLiga	16	2	2	0	—		0	0	0	0	0	0
Atlético Grau	2025	Liga 1	23	2	0	0	—		6 (Note: Appearances in the Copa Sudamericana)	1	0	0	29	3
Comerciantes Unidos	2026	Liga 1	26	5	0	0	1	0	–		–		27	5
Career total			114	15	2	0	1	0	6	1	3	0	136	16

=== International ===
As of match played 13 November 2026.

National team	Year	Apps	Goals
Peru	2025	1	0
Peru	2026	5	0
Total		6	0
