= Lirak Hasani =

English footballer

Personal information
- Full name: Lirak Hasani
- Date of birth: 25 June 2002 (age 24)
- Place of birth: Doncaster, England
- Position: Midfielder

Team information
- Current team: Truro City

Youth career
- Doncaster Rovers

Senior career*
Years	Team	Apps	(Gls)
2018–2022	Doncaster Rovers	11	(0)
2021	→ Gateshead (loan)	1	(0)
2021	→ Matlock Town (loan)	6	(1)
2022	→ Basford United (loan)	11	(0)
2022–2024	Gateshead	21	(1)
2023	→ Boston United (loan)	15	(0)
2023–2024	→ South Shields (loan)	24	(2)
2024	→ Blyth Spartans (loan)	5	(0)
2024–2025	Torquay United	34	(3)
2025–	Truro City	30	(2)
- * Club domestic league appearances and goals as of 18:34, 22 March 2026 (UTC)

Lirak Hasani (born 25 June 2002) is an English professional footballer who plays as a midfielder for Truro City.

== Early and personal life ==
Born in Doncaster, Hasani is from Cantley. His parents are Kosovo Albanian.

== Career ==
Hasani made his senior debut for Doncaster Rovers on 23 March 2019, in a 0–4 away league defeat at Luton Town, as a 72nd minute substitute for Aaron Lewis. Aged 16 at the time, he was voted Doncaster's 'Man of the Match' by the club's supporters, and was praised by manager Grant McCann for his performance.

On 7 January 2021, Hasani arrived at National League North side Gateshead on loan for the remainder of the 2020–21 season. In February 2021 he returned to Doncaster following the cancellation of the National League North.

On 11 August 2021, Hasani was loaned out to Matlock Town of the Northern Premier League Premier Division ahead of the 2021-22 season.

In February 2022 he joined Basford United on loan.

Hasani was released by Doncaster at the end of the 2021–22 season.

Hasani signed a one-year deal with Gateshead on 5 August 2022. He moved on loan to Boston United in January 2023. In August 2023 he moved on loan to South Shields. He moved on loan to Blyth Spartans in March 2024.

On 6 June 2024, Hasani joined National League South side Torquay United. In June 2025 he signed for Truro City.

== Career statistics ==
As of 23 April 2022

Appearances and goals by club, season and competition
Club	Season	League			FA Cup		League Cup		Other		Total	
Club	Season	Division	Apps	Goals	Apps	Goals	Apps	Goals	Apps	Goals	Apps	Goals
Doncaster Rovers	2018–19	League One	2	0	0	0	0	0	0	0	2	0
Doncaster Rovers	2019–20	League One	0	0	0	0	0	0	0	0	0	0
Doncaster Rovers	2020–21	League One	2	0	0	0	1	0	0	0	3	0
Doncaster Rovers	2021–22	League One	7	0	2	0	0	0	2	0	11	0
Doncaster Rovers	Total		11	0	2	0	1	0	2	0	16	0
Gateshead (loan)	2020–21	National League North	1	0	0	0	0	0	0	0	1	0
Matlock Town (loan)	2021–22	Northern Premier League	6	1	1	0	0	0	0	0	7	1
Basford United (loan)	2021–22	Northern Premier League	11	0	0	0	0	0	0	0	11	0
Gateshead	2022–23	Vanarama National League	1	0	0	0	0	0	0	0	1	0
Career total			30	1	3	0	1	0	2	0	35	1
