= Branden Horton =

English footballer

Personal information
- Full name: Branden Horton
- Date of birth: 9 September 2000 (age 26)
- Place of birth: Doncaster, England
- Height: 5 ft 10 in (1.78 m)
- Position: Left-back

Team information
- Current team: Scunthorpe United
- Number: 3

Youth career
- –2018: Doncaster Rovers

Senior career*
| Years | Team | Apps | (Gls) |
| 2018–2022 | Doncaster Rovers | 31 | (2) |
| 2018–2019 | → Gainsborough Trinity (loan) | 3 | (0) |
| 2019 | → Gainsborough Trinity (loan) | 8 | (1) |
| 2020–2021 | → Redditch United (loan) | 8 | (0) |
| 2022–2025 | Chesterfield | 58 | (1) |
| 2025 | Gateshead | 17 | (0) |
| 2025– | Scunthorpe United | 31 | (0) |
- * Club domestic league appearances and goals as of 18:07, 22 March 2026 (UTC)

Branden Horton (born 9 September 2000) is an English professional footballer who plays as a left-back for Scunthorpe United.

== Career ==
=== Doncaster Rovers ===
Born in Doncaster, Horton began his career with Doncaster Rovers, making two EFL Trophy appearances for the club in the 2018–19 season.

He moved on loan to Gainsborough Trinity in November 2018.

Horton turned professional with Doncaster in April 2019.

At the end of August 2019 he returned to Gainsborough Trinity, initially on a one-month loan. The loan was extended in October 2019.

On 21 September 2020, Horton joined Southern League Premier Division Central side Redditch United on loan until January 2021. On 15 January 2021, Horton was recalled by parent club Doncaster Rovers.

He made his Football League debut on 16 March 2021. Following relegation to League Two, Horton was released by the club at the end of the 2021–22 season.

=== Later career ===
On 14 June 2022, Horton agreed to join National League club Chesterfield upon the expiration of his contract with Doncaster Rovers on 1 July. On 11 January 2024 it was announced that Horton's contract had been extended until the summer of 2025.

On 5 February 2025, Horton returned to the National League, signing for Gateshead.

He signed for Scunthorpe United in June 2025.

== Career statistics ==
As of 22 June 2025

Appearances and goals by club, season and competition
| Club | Season | League | | | FA Cup | | League Cup | | Other | | Total | |
| Club | Season | Division | Apps | Goals | Apps | Goals | Apps | Goals | Apps | Goals | Apps | Goals |
|---|---|---|---|---|---|---|---|---|---|---|---|---|
| Doncaster Rovers | 2018–19 | League One | 0 | 0 | 0 | 0 | 0 | 0 | 2 (Note: Appearance(s) in the EFL Trophy.) | 0 | 2 | 0 |
| Doncaster Rovers | 2019–20 | League One | 0 | 0 | 0 | 0 | 0 | 0 | 0 | 0 | 0 | 0 |
| Doncaster Rovers | 2020–21 | League One | 11 | 0 | 0 | 0 | 0 | 0 | 0 | 0 | 11 | 0 |
| Doncaster Rovers | 2021–22 | League One | 20 | 2 | 2 | 1 | 2 | 0 | 4 | 0 | 28 | 3 |
| Doncaster Rovers | Total | | 31 | 2 | 2 | 1 | 2 | 0 | 6 | 0 | 41 | 3 |
| Gainsborough Trinity (loan) | 2018–19 | Northern Premier League | 3 | 0 | 0 | 0 | – | | 0 | 0 | 3 | 0 |
| Gainsborough Trinity (loan) | 2019–20 | Northern Premier League | 8 | 1 | 2 | 0 | – | | 1 (Note: Appearance(s) in the FA Trophy.) | 0 | 11 | 1 |
| Redditch United (loan) | 2020–21 | Southern League Premier Division Central | 8 | 0 | 1 | 1 | — | | 1 | 0 | 10 | 1 |
| Chesterfield | 2022–23 | National League | 25 | 1 | 2 | 0 | – | | 0 | 0 | 27 | 1 |
| Chesterfield | 2023–24 | National League | 26 | 0 | 4 | 0 | – | | 0 | 0 | 30 | 0 |
| Chesterfield | 2024–25 | League Two | 7 | 0 | 1 | 0 | 0 | 0 | 4 | 0 | 12 | 0 |
| Chesterfield | Total | | 58 | 1 | 7 | 0 | 0 | 0 | 4 | 0 | 69 | 1 |
| Gateshead | 2024–25 | National League | 17 | 0 | 0 | 0 | – | | 0 | 0 | 17 | 0 |
| Scunthorpe United | 2025–26 | National League | 0 | 0 | 0 | 0 | – | | 0 | 0 | 0 | 0 |
| Career total | | | 125 | 4 | 12 | 2 | 2 | 0 | 12 | 0 | 151 | 6 |

== Honours ==
Chesterfield

- National League: 2023–24
