= 2021–22 Doncaster Rovers F.C. season =

Doncaster Rovers
2021–22 season
- Chairman: David Blunt
- Manager: Richie Wellens (until 2 December); Gary McSheffrey (from 29 December)
- Stadium: Keepmoat Stadium
- League One: 22nd (relegated)
- FA Cup: Second round
- EFL Cup: Second round
- EFL Trophy: Second round
- Top goalscorer: League: Tommy Rowe (7); All: Tommy Rowe (8)
Home colours	Away colours

The 2021–22 season is Doncaster Rovers' 143rd year in their history and fifth consecutive season in League One. Along with the league, the club will also compete in the FA Cup, the EFL Cup and the 2021–22 EFL Trophy. The season covers the period from 1 July 2021 to 30 June 2022.

== Pre-season friendlies ==
Rovers revealed they would have friendly matches against Rossington Main, Spennymoor Town, Bradford City, Wakefield, Newcastle United, Sheffield United and Harrogate Town as part of their pre-season preparations.

10 July 2021 Friendly	Rossington Main	0–4	Doncaster Rovers	Rossington
15:00 BST		Report	Trialist 34', 40', 43'; Trialist 68' (pen.)	Stadium: Oxford Street

13 July 2021 Friendly	Spennymoor Town	Cancelled	Doncaster Rovers	Spennymoor
19:00 BST				Stadium: The Brewery Field
Note: Match cancelled due to COVID-19 positive test in Doncaster squad.

17 July 2021 Friendly	Bradford City	2–0	Doncaster Rovers	Bradford
15:00 BST	Eisa 10' (pen.); Cook 55'	Report		Stadium: Valley Parade

20 July 2021 Friendly	Wakefield	0–6	Doncaster Rovers	Featherstone
19:30 BST		Report	Trialist (?); Trialist (?); Close (?); Trialist (?); Williams (?); Trialist (?)	Stadium: Millennium Stadium

23 July 2021 Friendly	Doncaster Rovers	2–3	Newcastle United	Doncaster
19:00 BST	Rowe 30'; Bogle 76'	Report	Fraser 12'; Longstaff 24'; Wilson 56'	Stadium: Keepmoat Stadium

28 July 2021 Friendly	Doncaster Rovers	0–4	Sheffield United	Doncaster
19:00 BST		Report	Burke 25'; Mousset 34', 45+4'; Freeman 82'	Stadium: Keepmoat Stadium

1 August 2021 Friendly	Harrogate Town	2–3	Doncaster Rovers	Harrogate
14:00 BST	Muldoon 48'; Armstrong 65'	Report	Knoyle 19'; Barlow 48'; Trialist 51'	Stadium: EnviroVent Stadium

== Competitions ==
=== League One ===
==== League table ====
Pos	Team	Pld	W	D	L	GF	GA	GD	Pts	Promotion, qualification or relegation
17	Lincoln City	46	14	10	22	55	63	−8	52	
18	Shrewsbury Town	46	12	14	20	47	51	−4	50	
19	Morecambe	46	10	12	24	57	88	−31	42	
20	Fleetwood Town	46	8	16	22	62	82	−20	40	
21	Gillingham (R)	46	8	16	22	35	69	−34	40	Relegation to EFL League Two
22	Doncaster Rovers (R)	46	10	8	28	37	82	−45	38	Relegation to EFL League Two
23	AFC Wimbledon (R)	46	6	19	21	49	75	−26	37	Relegation to EFL League Two
24	Crewe Alexandra (R)	46	7	8	31	37	83	−46	29	Relegation to EFL League Two

Source: EFL Official Website
Rules for classification: 1) Points; 2) Goal difference; 3) Number of goals scored; 4) Head-to-head results; 5) Wins; 6) Away goals; 7) Penalty points based on yellow and red cards received excluding the last four games of the season (sec 9.5); 8) 12-point sending off offences; 9) If the tie affects the automatic promotion or relegation places, a play-off game or games would be held between the two tied teams
(R) Relegated

==== Results summary ====
Overall								Home						Away					
Pld	W	D	L	GF	GA	GD	Pts	W	D	L	GF	GA	GD	W	D	L	GF	GA	GD
46	10	8	28	37	82	−45	38	7	3	13	20	32	−12	3	5	15	17	50	−33

Last updated: 30 April 2022.

==== Results by matchday ====
Matchday	1	2	3	4	5	6	7	8	9	10	11	12	13	14	15	16	17	18	19	20	21	22	23	24	25	26	27	28	29	30	31	32	33	34	35	36	37	38	39	40	41	42	43	44	45	46
Ground	H	A	A	H	A	A	H	A	A	H	H	H	A	H	A	A	H	A	A	H	H	H	A	H	H	A	A	H	H	A	H	A	A	H	H	A	A	H	A	H	A	H	H	A	H	A
Result	L	L	L	D	L	L	W	L	L	W	L	W	L	D	L	D	D	L	L	L	W	L	L	L	L	L	W	L	L	W	L	L	W	L	W	D	L	L	D	L	L	W	L	D	W	D
Position	20	23	23	23	24	24	24	24	24	24	24	23	23	23	23	23	23	23	23	24	23	23	24	24	24	24	23	24	24	24	24	24	23	23	22	23	23	23	23	23	23	23	23	23	23	22

Updated to match(es) played on 30 April 2022. Source: Statto.com
A = Away; H = Home; W = Win; D = Draw; L = Loss; P = Postponed

==== Matches ====
Doncaster's fixtures were announced on 24 June 2021.

7 August 2021 1	Doncaster Rovers	1–2	AFC Wimbledon	Doncaster
15:00 BST	Seaman 46'	Report	Hartigan (yellow card) 32'; Assal 58'; McCormick 74', (yellow card) 75'; Guinness-Walker (yellow card) 90+1'	Stadium: Keepmoat Stadium; Attendance: 6,419; Referee: Sam Barrott

14 August 2021 2	Sheffield Wednesday	2–0	Doncaster Rovers	Owlerton
15:00 BST	Bannan 72'; Adeniran 75'	Report	Rowe (yellow card) 22'; Knoyle (yellow card) 40'; Galbraith (yellow card) 72'; Bogle (penalty missed) 88'	Stadium: Hillsborough; Attendance: 24,738; Referee: Ross Joyce

17 August 2021 3	Accrington Stanley	1–0	Doncaster Rovers	Accrington
19:45 BST	Dahlberg 3' (o.g.); Pell (yellow card) 23'; Butcher (yellow card) 62'; Sykes (yellow card) 90+3'	Report		Stadium: Wham Stadium; Attendance: 2,223; Referee: Scott Oldham

21 August 2021 4	Doncaster Rovers	0–0	Portsmouth	Doncaster
15:00 BST	Bostock (yellow card) 65'; Knoyle (yellow card) 87'	Report	Marquis (yellow card) 72'; Williams (penalty missed) 78'; Jacobs (yellow card) 88'	Stadium: Keepmoat Stadium; Attendance: 6,660; Referee: Carl Boyeson

28 August 2021 5	Rotherham United	2–0	Doncaster Rovers	Rotherham
13:00 BST	Miller (yellow card) 4', (red card) 53'; Smith 27', 45+2'	Report	Galbraith (yellow card) 56'; Smith (yellow card) 77'; Knoyle (yellow card) 90+5'	Stadium: AESSEAL New York Stadium; Attendance: 9,748; Referee: Martin Coy

11 September 2021 6	Wigan Athletic	2–1	Doncaster Rovers	Wigan
15:00 BST	Whatmough (yellow card) 11'; Keane 24', 52'; McClean (yellow card) 25'; Wyke (yellow card) 73'; Power (yellow card) 75'	Report	Rowe 22'; Dodoo (yellow card) 25'; Smith (yellow card) 31'; Olowu (yellow card) 48'	Stadium: DW Stadium; Attendance: 8,975; Referee: Tom Nield

18 September 2021 7	Doncaster Rovers	1–0	Morecambe	Doncaster
15:00 BST	Rowe 81'	Report		Stadium: Keepmoat Stadium; Attendance: 5,651; Referee: Will Finnie

25 September 2021 8	Plymouth Argyle	2–1	Doncaster Rovers	Plymouth
15:00 BST	Galloway (yellow card) 45+1'; Houghton (yellow card) 51'; Jephcott 68' (pen.); Grant 90+2' (pen.); Garrick (yellow card) 90+7'; Cooper (yellow card) 90+8'	Report	Smith (yellow card) 30'; Hiwula 54'; Cukur (yellow card) 57'; Rowe (yellow card) 80'; Galbraith (yellow card) 83'; Barlow (yellow card) 89'	Stadium: Home Park; Attendance: 11,033; Referee: Trevor Kettle

28 September 2021 9	Ipswich Town	6–0	Doncaster Rovers	Ipswich
19:45 BST	Burgess (yellow card) 5'; Bonne 13', 73'; Evans 31', 70', 76'; Edmundson 80'	Report	Dodoo (yellow card) 36'; Smith (yellow card) 58'	Stadium: Portman Road; Attendance: 18,111; Referee: Carl Brook

2 October 2021 10	Doncaster Rovers	2–1	Milton Keynes Dons	Doncaster
15:00 BST	Rowe 6'; Hiwula (yellow card) 34'; Cukur 79', (yellow card) 90+1'; Williams (yellow card) 82'	Report	Kioso 24'; Harvie (yellow card) 76'	Stadium: Keepmoat Stadium; Attendance: 5,927; Referee: Andrew Kitchen

16 October 2021 11	Doncaster Rovers	0–2	Wycombe Wanderers	Doncaster
15:00 BST	Knoyle (yellow card) 20'; Close (yellow card) 47'	Report	Stewart 2'; Akinfenwa 17'; Hanlan (yellow card) 42'	Stadium: Keepmoat Stadium; Attendance: 6,134; Referee: Craig Hicks

19 October 2021 12	Gillingham	1–0	Doncaster Rovers	Gillingham
19:45 BST	Oliver (yellow card) 41'; O'Keefe (yellow card) 76', (goal) 79'	Report	Knoyle (yellow card) 52'; Williams (yellow card) 70'	Stadium: Priestfield; Attendance: 3,713; Referee: Sam Purkiss

23 October 2021 13	Doncaster Rovers	3–2	Cheltenham Town	Doncaster
15:00 BST	Dodoo 23'; Anderson 45+1'; Vilca 54'; Dahlberg (yellow card) 87'	Report	Sercombe (penalty missed) 62'; May 68'; Williams 90+1'	Stadium: Keepmoat Stadium; Attendance: 6,101; Referee: Neil Hair

26 October 2021 14	Doncaster Rovers	1–1	Cambridge United	Doncaster
19:45 BST	Galbraith 68'; Williams (yellow card) 71'	Report	Gardner 7' (o.g.); Dunk (yellow card) 45+5'	Stadium: Keepmoat Stadium; Attendance: 6,146; Referee: Andy Haines

30 October 2021 15	Charlton Athletic	4–0	Doncaster Rovers	Charlton
15:00 BST	Purrington (yellow card) 18', (goal) 71'; Lee 21'; Washington 34' (pen.); Stockley 62'	Report	Vilca (yellow card) 9'	Stadium: The Valley; Attendance: 16,449; Referee: Tim Robinson

2 November 2021 16	Crewe Alexandra	1–1	Doncaster Rovers	Crewe
19:45 GMT	Porter 33'	Report	Galbraith (yellow card) 45+1'; Olowu 45+4'; Williams (yellow card) 56'; Anderson (yellow card) 74'; Smith (yellow card) 81'; Dahlberg (yellow card) 90+4'	Stadium: Alexandra Stadium; Attendance: 3,392; Referee: Simon Mather

20 November 2021 17	Doncaster Rovers	0–0	Lincoln City	Doncaster
15:00 GMT	Anderson (yellow card) 71'	Report	McGrandles (yellow card) 27'; Jackson (yellow card) 50'	Stadium: Keepmoat Stadium; Attendance: 8,129; Referee: Robert Lewis

23 November 2021 18	Bolton Wanderers	3–0	Doncaster Rovers	Horwich
20:00 GMT	Doyle (yellow card) 37'; Afolayan (yellow card) 39'; Kachunga 45+4'; Thomason 57'	Report	Olowu (red card) 43'	Stadium: University of Bolton Stadium; Attendance: 12,501; Referee: Steve Martin

27 November 2021 19	Burton Albion	2–0	Doncaster Rovers	Burton upon Trent
15:00 GMT	O'Connor 55'; Jebbison 76'; Hemmings (yellow card) 80'	Report	Barlow (yellow card) 29'; Close (yellow card) 39'; Dodoo (yellow card) 76'	Stadium: Pirelli Stadium; Attendance: 2,954; Referee: Peter Wright

7 December 2021 20	Doncaster Rovers	1–2	Oxford United	Doncaster
19:45 GMT	Jones (yellow card) 23'; Smith (yellow card) 69'; Horton 74'; Rowe (yellow card) 76'	Report	Sykes 16'; Henry 87'	Stadium: Keepmoat Stadium; Attendance: 5,785; Referee: James Oldham

11 December 2021 21	Doncaster Rovers	1–0	Shrewsbury Town	Doncaster
15:00 GMT	Horton (yellow card) 38'; Galbraith (yellow card) 75'; Olowu 79'	Report	Vela (yellow card) 75'	Stadium: Keepmoat Stadium; Attendance: 5,697; Referee: Christopher Pollard

18 December 2021	Lincoln City	v	Doncaster Rovers	Lincoln
15:00 GMT				Stadium: Sincil Bank
Note: The match was postponed due to COVID-19 cases in the Doncaster Rovers squad.

27 December 2021 22	Doncaster Rovers	0–3	Sunderland	Doncaster
12:30 GMT	Gardner (yellow card) 83'	Report	Stewart 7' (pen.); Embleton 41'; Blythe 50' (o.g.); Doyle (yellow card) 88'	Stadium: Keepmoat Stadium; Attendance: 10,751; Referee: Bobby Madley

2 January 2022 23	Morecambe	4–3	Doncaster Rovers	Morecambe
15:00 GMT	Stockton 52', 74'; Obika 83'; Diagouraga 85'; Ayunga (yellow card) 86'	Report	Barlow 7'; Gardner 26'; Olowu 29', (yellow card) 84'; Hiwula (yellow card) 64'	Stadium: Mazuma Stadium; Attendance: 4,001; Referee: James Bell

8 January 2022 24	Doncaster Rovers	0–1	Fleetwood Town	Doncaster
15:00 GMT	Barlow (yellow card) 43'; Rowe (yellow card) 81'	Report	Harrison 50'; Camps (yellow card) 80'; Hayes (yellow card) 90'	Stadium: Keepmoat Stadium; Attendance: 5,648; Referee: Darren Bond

15 January 2022 25	Doncaster Rovers	1–2	Wigan Athletic	Doncaster
15:00 GMT	Hasani (yellow card) 45+4'; Bogle 60'; Galbraith (yellow card) 70'; Dodoo (yellow card) 84'	Report	Power 11'; Keane 54'; Amos (yellow card) 85'	Stadium: Keepmoat Stadium; Attendance: 7,169; Referee: Alan Young

18 January 2022 26	Cambridge United	3–1	Doncaster Rovers	Cambridge
19:45 GMT	Iredale (yellow card) 28'; Knibbs 45+1'; Dunk 63'; Brophy (yellow card) 90+2'; Smith 90+3'	Report	Dodoo 71'; Galbraith (yellow card) 89'	Stadium: Abbey Stadium; Attendance: 4,575; Referee: Christopher Sarginson

22 January 2022 27	Milton Keynes Dons	0–1	Doncaster Rovers	Denbigh
15:00 GMT	McEachran (yellow card) 73'	Report	Dodoo 41'; Olowu (yellow card) 58'; Horton (yellow card) 81'; Barlow (yellow card) 90+3'	Stadium: Stadium MK; Attendance: 7,229; Referee: Darren Drysdale

29 January 2022 28	Doncaster Rovers	1–3	Plymouth Argyle	Doncaster
15:00 GMT	Horton 17'; Younger (yellow card) 82'; Rowe (yellow card) 90+4'	Report	Jephcott 23'; Wilson (yellow card) 37'; Edwards 63'; Garrick 79'	Stadium: Keepmoat Stadium; Attendance: 6,493; Referee: Martin Coy

1 February 2022 29	Doncaster Rovers	0–5	Rotherham United	Doncaster
19:45 GMT	Younger (yellow card) 31'	Report	Miller 8'; Wiles 16'; Ogbene 72'; Barlaser 76' (pen.); Lindsay 89'	Stadium: Keepmoat Stadium; Attendance: 9,255; Referee: Scott Oldham

5 February 2022 30	Sunderland	1–2	Doncaster Rovers	Sunderland
15:00 GMT	Evans (yellow card) 30', (goal) 89'	Report	Griffiths 22'; Rowe 45+2'	Stadium: Stadium of Light; Attendance: 38,395; Referee: Will Finnie

8 February 2022 31	Doncaster Rovers	0–1	Ipswich Town	Doncaster
19:45 GMT		Report	Bakinson (yellow card) 25', (goal) 39'; Donacien (yellow card) 83'	Stadium: Keepmoat Stadium; Attendance: 6,383; Referee: Ollie Yates

12 February 2022 32	Portsmouth	4–0	Doncaster Rovers	Milton
15:00 GMT	Hackett-Fairchild 56'; Hirst 63'; Thompson (yellow card) 66'; O'Brien 81'; Raggett 90+5'	Report		Stadium: Fratton Park; Attendance: 14,767; Referee: Tom Reeves

15 February 2022 33	Lincoln City	0–1	Doncaster Rovers	Lincoln
19:45 GMT	Walsh (yellow card) 73' (yellow-red card) 82'	Report	Gardner 75' (pen.); Mitchell (yellow card) 90+2'	Stadium: LNER Stadium; Attendance: 9,237; Referee: Ben Speedie

19 February 2022 34	Doncaster Rovers	1–3	Sheffield Wednesday	Doncaster
15:00 GMT	Gardner 45' (pen.), (yellow card) 74'	Report	Byers (yellow card) 50'; Paterson 70'; Bannan (penalty missed) 78', 83'; Berahino 80'	Stadium: Keepmoat Stadium; Attendance: 11,217; Referee: Craig Hicks

22 February 2022 35	Doncaster Rovers	2–0	Accrington Stanley	Doncaster
19:45 GMT	Martin 67'; Olowu 87'	Report	Clark (yellow card) 64'; Nottingham (yellow card) 66'	Stadium: Eco-Power Stadium; Attendance: 5,396; Referee: Andy Haines

26 February 2022 36	AFC Wimbledon	2–2	Doncaster Rovers	Wimbledon
15:00 GMT	Rudoni 23'; McCormick (yellow card) 39', (goal) 49'; Marsh (yellow card) 90+1'	Report	Olowu (yellow card) 22'; Gardner (yellow card) 54'; Rowe 63', 66'; Smith (yellow card) 79'	Stadium: Plough Lane Stadium; Attendance: 7,912; Referee: Robert Lewis

5 March 2022 37	Cheltenham Town	4–0	Doncaster Rovers	Cheltenham
15:00 GMT	May 16', 75'; Boyle (yellow card) 31'; Raglan (yellow card) 33'; Williams 38'; Bonds (yellow card) 69'; Pollock 84'	Report	Olowu (yellow card) 12'; Clayton (yellow card) 34' (yellow-red card) 48'	Stadium: The Jonny Rocks Stadium; Attendance: 4,212; Referee: Peter Wright

12 March 2022 38	Doncaster Rovers	0–1	Gillingham	Doncaster
15:00 GMT	Galbraith (yellow card) 90+7'	Report	Kelman 1'	Stadium: Eco-Power Stadium; Attendance: 6,920; Referee: Anthony Backhouse

19 March 2022 39	Fleetwood Town	0–0	Doncaster Rovers	Fleetwood
15:00 GMT		Report	Barlow (yellow card) 22'	Stadium: Highbury Stadium; Attendance: 3,146; Referee: Paul Howard

26 March 2022 40	Doncaster Rovers	0–1	Charlton Athletic	Doncaster
15:00 GMT	Barlow (yellow card) 45+2'	Report	Washington (penalty missed) 15'; Gilbey (yellow card) 18'; Stockley (yellow card) 61', (goal) 66'; Dobson (yellow card) 86'; Blackett-Taylor (yellow card) 89'	Stadium: Eco-Power Stadium; Attendance: 6,350; Referee: Sam Allison

2 April 2022 41	Wycombe Wanderers	2–0	Doncaster Rovers	High Wycombe
15:00 BST	McCleary 18'; Mehmeti 75'; Obita (yellow card) 90+2'	Report	Knoyle (yellow card) 57'	Stadium: Adams Park; Attendance: 5,943; Referee: John Busby

9 April 2022 42	Doncaster Rovers	2–0	Crewe Alexandra	Doncaster
15:00 BST	Rowe 10', (yellow card) 60'; Martin 47'	Report	Mandron (yellow card) 60'; Long (yellow card) 83'	Stadium: Eco-Power Stadium; Attendance: 5,912; Referee: Declan Bourne

15 April 2022 43	Doncaster Rovers	1–2	Bolton Wanderers	Doncaster
15:00 BST	Odubeko 77'; Galbraith (yellow card) 84'; Williams (yellow card) 90+5'	Report	Williams (yellow card) 7'; Thomason (yellow card) 26'; Bakayoko (yellow card) 29', (goal) 47'; Johnston (yellow card) 71'; Sadlier 78'	Stadium: Eco-Power Stadium; Attendance: 8,668; Referee: James Oldham

18 April 2022 44	Shrewsbury Town	3–3	Doncaster Rovers	Shrewsbury
15:00 BST	Udoh 19'; Bowman 34'; Whalley 42', (yellow card) 90+3'	Report	Odubeko 54'; Griffiths 77'; Knoyle 90+4'	Stadium: Montgomery Waters Meadow; Attendance: 6,556; Referee: Andrew Kitchen

23 April 2022 45	Doncaster Rovers	2–0	Burton Albion	Doncaster
15:00 BST	Dodoo 36'; Martin 75'	Report	Ahadme (penalty missed) 33'; Oshilaja (yellow card) 61'; Hamer (yellow card) 79'; Powell (yellow card) 85'	Stadium: Eco-Power Stadium; Attendance: 6,034; Referee: Will Finnie

30 April 2022 46	Oxford United	1–1	Doncaster Rovers	Littlemore
12:30 BST	Bodin 23'	Report	Jackson (yellow card) 55'; Martin 67'	Stadium: The Kassam Stadium; Attendance: 9,139; Referee: Trevor Kettle

=== FA Cup ===
Doncaster were drawn away to Scunthorpe United in the first round and at home to Mansfield Town in the second round.

6 November 2021 First round	Scunthorpe United	0–1	Doncaster Rovers	Scunthorpe
13:00 GMT		Report	Loft 38' (o.g.); Dahlberg (yellow card) 66'	Stadium: Sands Venue Stadium; Attendance: 3,301; Referee: Carl Boyeson

4 December 2021 Second round	Doncaster Rovers	2–3	Mansfield Town	Doncaster
15:00 GMT	Horton 7'; Ravenhill (yellow card) 56'; Rowe 84'	Report	Will Forrester 48'; Lapslie 60', 71'; Stirk (yellow card) 88'	Stadium: Keepmoat Stadium; Attendance: 7,040; Referee: Seb Stockbridge

=== EFL Cup ===
Doncaster Rovers were drawn away to Walsall in the first round and Stoke City in the second round.

10 August 2021 First round	Walsall	0–0 (3–4 p)	Doncaster Rovers	Bescot
19:45 BST	Osadebe (yellow card) 60'	Report	Close (yellow card) 36'; Greaves (red card) 88'	Stadium: Banks's Stadium; Attendance: 2,384; Referee: John Busby
	Penalties
	Wilkinson (penalty scored); Phillips (penalty scored); Osadebe (penalty missed); Earing (penalty missed); Kiernan (penalty missed); Ward (penalty scored); Kinsella (penalty missed)		Gardner (penalty missed); Close (penalty scored); Cukur (penalty missed); Williams (penalty missed); Barlow (penalty scored); Anderson (penalty scored); Knoyle (penalty scored)

24 August 2021 Second round	Stoke City	2–0	Doncaster Rovers	Stoke-on-Trent
19:45 BST	Batth (yellow card) 8'; Ince 38'; Surridge 48', (yellow card) 65'	Report	Williams (yellow card) 25'	Stadium: Bet365 Stadium; Attendance: 6,193; Referee: Marc Edwards

=== EFL Trophy ===
Rovers were drawn into Northern Group E alongside Manchester City U21s, Rotherham United and Scunthorpe United. On July 8, the dates for the group matches were confirmed.

Pos	Div	Team	Pld	W	PW	PL	L	GF	GA	GD	Pts	Qualification
1	L1	Rotherham United	3	3	0	0	0	15	1	+14	9	Advance to Round 2
2	L1	Doncaster Rovers	3	2	0	0	1	5	9	−4	6	Advance to Round 2
3	ACA	Manchester City U21	3	1	0	0	2	4	7	−3	3	
4	L2	Scunthorpe United	3	0	0	0	3	3	10	−7	0	

Source: EFL.com

7 September 2021 Group game 1	Doncaster Rovers	0–6	Rotherham United	Doncaster
19:00 BST		Report	Miller 13'; Ladapo 15'; Jones 16' (o.g.); Mattock (yellow card) 30', (goal) 85'; Grigg 49'; Hull 67'	Stadium: Keepmoat Stadium; Attendance: 1,765; Referee: Ben Speedie

21 September 2021 Group game 2	Doncaster Rovers	2–1	Manchester City U21	Doncaster
19:00 BST	Dodoo 14', (yellow card) 38', (goal) 58'; Vilca (yellow card) 71'; Gardner (yellow card) 89'	Report	Edozie 8'; Smith (yellow card) 68'; Sodje (yellow card) 88'	Stadium: Keepmoat Stadium; Attendance: 1,802; Referee: Ben Toner

9 November 2021 Group game 3	Scunthorpe United	2–3	Doncaster Rovers	Scunthorpe
19:00 GMT	Loft 88'; Scrimshaw 90'	Report	Vilca 5'; Dodoo 16', 58'	Stadium: Sands Venue Stadium; Attendance: 1,011; Referee: Thomas Bramall

1 December 2021 Second round	Crewe Alexandra	2–0	Doncaster Rovers	Crewe
19:45 GMT	Knight 33'; Finney 72'	Report	Knoyle (yellow card) 45'; Anderson (yellow card) 71'	Stadium: Alexandra Stadium; Attendance: 699; Referee: Ross Joyce

== Transfers ==
=== Transfers in ===
Date	Position	Nationality	Name	From	Fee	Ref.
1 July 2021	CM	(England)	Ben Close	(England) Portsmouth	Free transfer	
1 July 2021	RB	(England)	Kyle Knoyle	(England) Cambridge United	Free transfer	
1 July 2021	LM	(England)	Tommy Rowe	(England) Bristol City	Free transfer	
1 July 2021	CB	(England)	Ro-Shaun Williams	(England) Shrewsbury Town	Free transfer	
10 July 2021	CF	(England)	Jordy Hiwula	(England) Portsmouth	Free transfer	
28 July 2021	LM	(England)	Aidan Barlow	Free agent	—N/a	
6 August 2021	AM	(England)	Dan Gardner	(England) Wigan Athletic	Free transfer	
6 September 2021	LW	(England)	Joe Dodoo	(England) Wigan Athletic	Free transfer	
10 September 2021	CB	(England)	Joseph Olowu	(England) Arsenal	Free transfer	
12 January 2022	CF	(England)	Kieran Agard	(England) Plymouth Argyle	Free transfer	
19 January 2022	CB	(England)	Ollie Younger	(England) Sunderland	Free transfer	
21 January 2022	GK	(England)	Jonathan Mitchell	(England) Hartlepool United	Free transfer	
25 January 2022	CM	(England)	Adam Clayton	(England) Birmingham City	Free transfer	
31 January 2022	CF	(England)	Reo Griffiths	(France) Olympique Lyonnais	Free transfer	

=== Loans in ===
Date from	Position	Nationality	Name	From	Date until	Ref.
5 July 2021	CM	(England)	Matt Smith	(England) Arsenal	End of season	
19 July 2021	CF	(Turkey)	Tiago Çukur	(England) Watford	11 January 2022 (Note: On 11 January, Çukur was recalled by his parent club Watford.)	
6 August 2021	GK	(Sweden)	Pontus Dahlberg	(England) Watford	13 January 2022 (Note: On 13 January, Dahlberg was recalled by his parent club Watford.)	
13 August 2021	CM	(Northern Ireland)	Ethan Galbraith	(England) Manchester United	End of season	
31 August 2021	AM	(Peru)	Rodrigo Vilca	(England) Newcastle United	31 December 2021 (Note: On 31 December, Vilca was recalled by his parent club Newcastle United.)	
17 January 2022	LW	(England)	Josh Martin	(England) Norwich City	End of season	
27 January 2022	CF	(Republic of Ireland)	Mipo Odubeko	(England) West Ham United	End of season	
28 January 2022	LB	(England)	Ben Jackson	(England) Huddersfield Town	End of season	

=== Loans out ===
Date from	Position	Nationality	Name	To	Date until	Ref.
12 August 2021	CM	(England)	Lirak Hasani	(England) Matlock Town	1 January 2022	
13 August 2021	GK	(England)	Ben Bottomley	(England) Frickley Athletic		
22 September 2021	CB	(England)	Ben Blythe	(England) Farsley Celtic	22 October 2021	
22 September 2021	CM	(Northern Ireland)	Liam Ravenhill	(England) Matlock Town	21 October 2021	
15 October 2021	DM	(England)	AJ Greaves	(England) Redditch United		
22 October 2021	CM	(Northern Ireland)	Liam Ravenhill	(England) AFC Telford United	22 November 2021	
10 December 2021	GK	(England)	Ben Bottomley	(England) Tadcaster Albion	February 2022	
13 January 2022	DF	(England)	Bobby Faulkner	(England) Frickley Athletic	March 2022	
3 February 2022	CM	(Northern Ireland)	Liam Ravenhill	(England) Mickleover	24 April 2022	
3 February 2022	RM	(England)	Ed Williams	(United States) Rochester New York	End of season	
4 February 2022	CM	(England)	AJ Greaves	(England) York City	End of season	
24 February 2022	CM	(England)	Lirak Hasani	(England) Basford United	27 April 2022	
18 March 2022	GK	(England)	Tom Chambers	(England) Armthorpe Welfare	End of season	

=== Transfers out ===
Date	Position	Nationality	Name	To	Fee	Ref.
9 May 2021	RM	(England)	James Coppinger	Retired		
30 June 2021	LB	(Northern Ireland)	Danny Amos	(England) Port Vale	Released	
30 June 2021	RB	(England)	Charlie Bell	(England) Staveley Miners Welfare	Released	
30 June 2021	CM	(The Gambia)	Ethan Bojang	(England) Peterborough United	Released	
30 June 2021	MF	(England)	Josh Clemitson	Free agent	Released	
30 June 2021	LB	(England)	Lewis Cunningham	(England) York City	Released	
30 June 2021	CF	(England)	Owan Derrett	(England) Handsworth	Released	
30 June 2021	CM	(Spain)	Madger Gomes	(England) Crewe Alexandra	Released	
30 June 2021	RB	(England)	Brad Halliday	(England) Fleetwood Town	Released	
30 June 2021	LB	(England)	Reece James	(England) Blackpool	Free transfer	
30 June 2021	CB	(England)	Max Jemson	(England) Sleaford Town	Released	
30 June 2021	CF	(England)	Luca Nelson	(England) Billingham Town	Released	
30 June 2021	GK	(Republic of Ireland)	Ian Lawlor	(Scotland) Dundee	Released	
30 June 2021	RM	(Democratic Republic of the Congo)	Jason Lokilo	(Poland) Górnik Łęczna	Rejected contract	
30 June 2021	CB	(Wales)	Joe Wright		Released	
9 July 2021	CB	(England)	Andy Butler	(England) Boston United	Mutual consent	
27 January 2022	CF	(England)	Omar Bogle	(England) Hartlepool United	Free transfer	
