= Adam Long (footballer) =

Manx footballer

Personal information
- Full name: Adam David Long
- Date of birth: 14 November 2000 (age 25)
- Place of birth: Douglas, Isle of Man
- Position: Defender

Team information
- Current team: Bangor City 1876
- Number: 31

Youth career
- –2017: St Georges
- 2017–2022: Wigan Athletic

Senior career*
Years	Team	Apps	(Gls)
2017–2022	Wigan Athletic	14	(0)
2020	→ Notts County (loan)	4	(1)
2022–2023	Doncaster Rovers	15	(0)
2024–2025	AFC Fylde	28	(2)
2025–2026	Coleraine	5	(0)
2026–	Bangor City 1876	22	(2)
- * Club domestic league appearances and goals as of 08:45, 8 November 2026 (UTC)

Adam David Long (born 11 November 2000) is a Manx footballer who plays as a defender for Bangor City 1876.

== Club career ==
Born on the Isle of Man, Long began his career with local side St Georges before joining Wigan Athletic in 2017. He made his first-team debut during their EFL Trophy tie against Middlesbrough U23s in October 2017.

On 20 February 2020, Long signed for Notts County on an initial one-month loan deal.

On 17 July 2022, Long signed for newly relegated League Two club Doncaster Rovers for an undisclosed fee, signing a two-year deal.

In February 2024, he left Doncaster by mutual consent, and signed for AFC Fylde. He was released at the end of the 2024–25 season.

He joined Bangor City 1876 in February 2026 after a spell in Northern Ireland playing for Coleraine where he made five league appearances before departing in January 2026.

== Career statistics ==
As of 7 April 2023

Appearances and goals by club, season and competition
Club	Season	League			FA Cup		EFL Cup		Other		Total	
Club	Season	Division	Apps	Goals	Apps	Goals	Apps	Goals	Apps	Goals	Apps	Goals
Wigan Athletic	2017–18	League One	0	0	0	0	0	0	2 (Note: Appearances in the EFL Trophy)	0	2	0
Wigan Athletic	2018–19	Championship	0	0	0	0	0	0	0	0	0	0
Wigan Athletic	2019–20	Championship	0	0	0	0	0	0	0	0	0	0
Wigan Athletic	2020–21	League One	13	0	1	0	1	0	2	0	17	0
Wigan Athletic	2021–22	League One	1	0	0	0	0	0	3	1	4	1
Wigan Athletic	Total		14	0	1	0	1	0	7	1	23	1
Notts County (loan)	2019–20	National League	4	1	0	0	0	0	1 (Note: Appearances in the FA Trophy)	0	5	1
Doncaster Rovers	2022–23	League Two	15	0	1	0	1	0	3	1	20	1
Career total			33	1	2	0	2	0	11	2	48	3
