= Ed Williams (footballer) =

English footballer

Personal information
- Full name: Edward Christopher Williams
- Date of birth: 20 July 1995 (age 31)
- Height: 5 ft 7 in (1.70 m)
- Position: Midfielder

Team information
- Current team: Gloucester City

Youth career
- Cheltenham Town

Senior career*
Years	Team	Apps	(Gls)
2013–2014	Cheltenham Town	0	(0)
2013	→ Bishop's Cleeve (loan)		
2013–2014	→ Evesham United (loan)	9	(1)
2014	→ Gloucester City (loan)	7	(0)
2014–2015	Cirencester Town	35	(6)
2015–2018	Gloucester City	89	(14)
2018–2020	Kidderminster Harriers	61	(14)
2020–2022	Doncaster Rovers	12	(0)
2022	→ Rochester New York (loan)	11	(1)
2022	Rochester New York	9	
2023	Chippenham Town	10	(1)
2023	Swindon Supermarine	11	(4)
2023–2024	Chippenham Town	29	(2)
2024–	Gloucester City	17	(1)

International career
2018–2019	England C	2	(0)
- * Club domestic league appearances and goals as of 16:07, 5 January 2025 (UTC)

Edward Christopher Williams (born 20 July 1995) is an English professional footballer who plays as a midfielder for Gloucester City.

== Club career ==
Born in Cheltenham, Williams spent his early career with Cheltenham Town, Bishop's Cleeve, Evesham United, Gloucester City, Cirencester Town and Kidderminster Harriers. He combined his non-league career with studying at Hartpury University.

He signed for Doncaster Rovers in August 2020. He was made available for transfer by Doncaster manager Richie Wellens in July 2021, but he returned to the first-team squad in December 2021 following the appointment of caretaker manager Gary McSheffrey.

He signed on loan for MLS Next Pro club Rochester New York FC in February 2022. Following Doncaster's relegation to League Two, Williams was released by the club at the end of the 2021–22 season. Williams' move to Rochester became permanent.

Williams returned to England to join Chippenham Town in March 2023. He moved to Swindon Supermarine in August 2023, before returning to Chippenham Town in October 2023.

In June 2024 he returned to Gloucester City.

== International career ==
He has also played for the England C national team.
