= Kade Craig =

English footballer (born 2002)

Personal information
- Full name: Kade Elliot James Craig
- Date of birth: 10 December 2002 (age 23)
- Position: Defender

Team information
- Current team: AFC Telford United
- Number: 30

Youth career
- Birmingham City
- 2021–2022: Shrewsbury Town

Senior career*
Years	Team	Apps	(Gls)
2022–2023	Shrewsbury Town	1	(0)
2022	→ AFC Telford United (loan)	4	(0)
2023–2025	Solihull Moors	36	(4)
2024	→ Brackley Town (loan)	14	(0)
2025–2026	The New Saints	0	(0)
2026–	AFC Telford United	3	(1)
- * Club domestic league appearances and goals as of 11:56, 30 March 2026 (UTC)

Kade Elliot James Craig (born 10 December 2002) is an English professional footballer who plays as a defender for AFC Telford United.

== Career ==
Craig played for the youth team at Birmingham City, before joining the under-18 team at Shrewsbury Town and turning professional at the club in June 2022. He made his first-team debut on 30 August, playing in a centre-back partnership with Declan Hutchings in a 2–1 defeat to Wolverhampton Wanderers U21 in an EFL Trophy fixture at the New Meadow. On 28 October, he joined National League North club AFC Telford United on a one-month loan. However he dislocated his shoulder in training and returned to Shrewsbury to have surgery and rehabilitation. He signed a contract extension at Shrewsbury in December, keeping him at the club until the end of the 2022–23 season. He departed the club at the end of this deal.

In July 2023, Craig signed for National League club Solihull Moors on a two-year deal following a successful trial period. In August 2024, he joined National League North club Brackley Town on loan until 6 January 2025.

In July 2025 he joined The New Saints and departed the club by mutual consent on 2 February 2026. The same month he returned to AFC Telford United.

== Style of play ==
Craig is a defender who can play as a left-sided centre-back, left-back or at left-wing-back.

== Career statistics ==
As of match played 1 November 2022

Appearances and goals by club, season and competition
Club	Season	League			FA Cup		EFL Cup		Other		Total	
Club	Season	Division	Apps	Goals	Apps	Goals	Apps	Goals	Apps	Goals	Apps	Goals
Shrewsbury Town	2022–23	EFL League One	0	0	0	0	0	0	2 (Note: Appearance/s in the EFL Trophy)	0	2	0
AFC Telford United (loan)	2022–23	National League North	2	0	0	0	0	0	0	0	2	0
Career total			0	0	0	0	0	0	2	0	2	0
