= Marko Maroši =

Slovak footballer (born 1993)

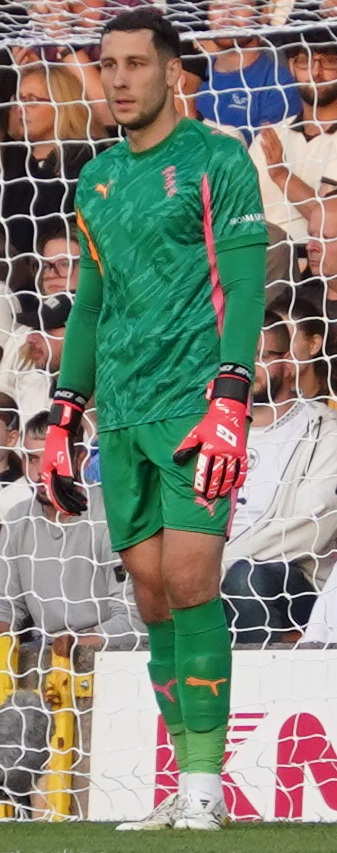
- Maroši as a Port Vale player (2025)

Personal information
- Full name: Marko Maroši
- Date of birth: 23 October 1993 (age 33)
- Place of birth: Michalovce, Slovakia
- Height: 1.93 m (6 ft 4 in)
- Position: Goalkeeper

Team information
- Current team: Port Vale
- Number: 20

Youth career
- 2003–2006: Strážske
- 2006–2010: Pendle Forest
- 2010–2012: Burnley College

Senior career*
| Years | Team | Apps | (Gls) |
| 2012–2013 | Barnoldswick Town | 16 | (0) |
| 2013–2014 | Wigan Athletic | 0 | (0) |
| 2014–2019 | Doncaster Rovers | 78 | (0) |
| 2019–2021 | Coventry City | 54 | (0) |
| 2021–2024 | Shrewsbury Town | 133 | (0) |
| 2024–2025 | Plymouth Argyle | 0 | (0) |
| 2025 | Cambridge United | 2 | (0) |
| 2025– | Port Vale | 13 | (0) |
| 2026 | → Tranmere Rovers (loan) | 16 | (0) |

International career
| 2014 | Slovakia U21 | 1 | (0) |
- * Club domestic league appearances and goals as of 10:21, 22 November 2026 (UTC)

Marko Maroši (born 23 October 1993) is a Slovak professional footballer who plays as a goalkeeper for EFL League Two club Port Vale.

Maroši represented Slovakia at under-21 level, though he began his career in English non-League football with Barnoldswick Town. He turned professional at Wigan Athletic in 2013, though he did not play a competitive game for the club before he joined Doncaster Rovers on a free transfer in August 2014. He played 95 league and cup games in five years, helping the club to win promotion out of League Two in the 2016–17 season. He moved on to Coventry City in May 2019 and was named on the PFA Team of the Year for the 2019–20 campaign as Coventry won the League One title. He played 20 Championship games and was sold to Shrewsbury Town in June 2021. He played 147 matches in three seasons at Shrewsbury. He spent the first half of the 2024–25 season with Plymouth Argyle, and then the second half with Cambridge United. He joined Port Vale in June 2025, though was soon dropped from the first team and loaned out to Tranmere Rovers in February 2026.

== Early and personal life ==
Marko Maroši was born on 23 October 1993 in Michalovce, Slovakia. He played for local side Strážske at the age of ten, leaving after three years with his family to live in Burnley, England. He played youth football for Pendle Forest. He attended Sir John Thursby Community College where he completed his GCSEs. He then went on to study at Burnley College for an Advanced Diploma in Public Services at Burnley College and trained with the college's football academy.

Maroši was married with one daughter in 2024.

== Club career ==
Maroši played 21 matches for North West Counties League Premier Division club Barnoldswick Town in the 2012–13 season.

=== Wigan Athletic ===
Maroši started his professional career at Wigan Athletic after being signed by manager Roberto Martínez. Martínez left and his replacement, Owen Coyle, told Maroši that he was too short and not good enough for professional football. He left the DW Stadium at the end of the 2013–14 season without playing a competitive game for the Latics.

=== Doncaster Rovers ===
On 7 August 2014, Maroši joined Doncaster Rovers on a free transfer, signing a two-year deal after impressing manager Paul Dickov on a summer-long trial. He made his League One debut for Doncaster on 27 September, in a 3–0 defeat at Walsall, replacing an injured Jed Steer in the 30th-minute. He featured three more times in the 2014–15 campaign, and played twice in the 2015–16 season.

He signed a one-year contract extension in June 2016 after regular custodian Thorsten Stuckmann was placed on the transfer list. He faced competition from new signing Ross Etheridge. Etheridge started the 2016–17 season as first-choice, until manager Darren Ferguson turned to Maroši in August; Maroši credited goalkeeping coach Paul Gerrard for his good form. Ferguson, though, demanded that Maroši improve his distribution and decision-making to better suit his high tempo philosophy. He retained his place in the first XI until he sustained a serious ankle injury in January, which led to the arrival of Ian Lawlor. Rovers secured an automatic promotion place out of League Two.

He spent most of the 2017–18 season as back-up to Lawlor. He started the 2018–19 campaign as Rovers' first-choice goalkeeper, though he was sent off for handling the ball outside the area in a 0–0 draw with Portsmouth at the Keepmoat Stadium on 26 August. He lost his position to Lawlor in November and regained it after Lawlor suffered a season-ending injury in January. Donny reached the League One play-offs, losing to Charlton Athletic at the semi-final stage. Maroši left Doncaster after he rejected a new contract offer at the end of the season. Manager Grant McCann admitted that "we can't get anywhere near his demands". He played 95 games in five seasons, keeping 24 clean sheets.

=== Coventry City ===
On 22 May 2019, Maroši agreed to join Coventry City on a three-year deal to start on 30 June. He was praised by manager Mark Robins for his shot stopping after the Sky Blues picked up their 11th clean sheet of the 2019–20 campaign in February. The COVID-19 pandemic brought the season to a premature end, with Coventry being named as champions on points per game. He was named on the PFA Team of the Year, alongside teammates Liam Walsh, Fankaty Dabo and Matt Godden.

He suffered a fractured cheekbone and eye socket in a 1–0 win over Cardiff City at St Andrew's on 25 November 2020. He returned to fitness and spent the rest of the 2020–21 season in-and-out of the team as understudy Ben Wilson had impressed in his absence. He later said he had returned too soon, as he had hoped to win an international call-up. He played 61 games in two seasons with Coventry, keeping 21 clean sheets.

=== Shrewsbury Town ===
On 24 June 2021, Maroši signed a three-year deal with League One club Shrewsbury Town after being signed for an undisclosed fee. He said he was particularly excited to be working with goalkeepering coach Brian Jensen. He enjoyed good form at the start of the 2021–22 season, despite the Shrews struggling, and was cited as being "one of best in [the] league" by manager Steve Cotterill. Maroši was racially abused at Charlton Athletic, which led to a supporter being arrested.

On 24 September 2022, he was praised for his performance as he played with a dislocated finger in a 2–1 victory over Burton Albion at the New Meadow. Burton manager Dino Maamria said it was "probably the best performance I’ve seen in the Football League". He played 49 games in the 2022–23 campaign. He remained the club's first-choice throughout the 2023–24 season under Steve Cotterill, Matthew Taylor and then Paul Hurst. Hurst offered the Slovak a new contract, though he was doubtful that Maroši would stay on, and indeed he did not. He was expected to sign with Rotherham United ahead of alleged interest from numerous clubs.

=== Plymouth Argyle ===
On 13 September 2024, Maroši signed for Championship club Plymouth Argyle on a short-term deal. He arrived as cover for Daniel Grimshaw whilst Conor Hazard underwent surgery, and was praised by manager Wayne Rooney for his attitude in training. He did not play a first-team game for the Pilgrims and left Home Park after his contract expired on 14 January, being described by the club as showing "true professionalism" for being "an exemplary squad member".

=== Cambridge United ===
On 14 January 2025, Maroši signed for Cambridge United on a short-term deal until the end of the 2024–25 season. He played two League One games for Garry Monk's U's before he was sidelined with a hamstring injury. He left the Abbey Stadium as one of 11 players released following confirmation of the club's relegation.

=== Port Vale ===
On 30 June 2025, Maroši agreed a two-year deal with newly promoted League One club Port Vale. Manager Darren Moore said that "he will add huge competition in the goalkeeping department". Moore dropped Maroši after five games in favour of new signing Joe Gauci. On 5 February 2026, he joined Tranmere Rovers on an emergency loan. The loan was granted due to a hip injury sustained by Rovers goalkeeper Luke McGee. He returned to Tranmere on an emergency one-week loan on 14 March after Joe Murphy sustained a concussion injury. He played 16 games for Tranmere in the second half of the 2025–26 season. He returned to Vale Park to find himself transfer listed.

He started the 2026–27 season without a squad number before Jon Brady gave him number 20 and named him on the bench following an injury to Mason Terry. He then was named in the first XI after number one Jackson Smith sustained a concussion in mid-September, keeping his place after Smith returned to fitness having played well in his stead.

== International career ==
Maroši made one appearance for the Slovakia under-21 team, in a friendly against Portugal U20. He was also a member of the squad in the unsuccessful attempt to qualify for the 2015 UEFA European Under-21 Championship. He was in contention to play for the senior team during his time with Coventry City in the Championship.

== Style of play ==
Maroši is a goalkeeper with strong shot-stopping ability.

== Career statistics ==
As of match played 21 November 2026

Appearances and goals by club, season and competition
| Club | Season | League | | | FA Cup | | EFL Cup | | Other | | Total | |
| Club | Season | Division | Apps | Goals | Apps | Goals | Apps | Goals | Apps | Goals | Apps | Goals |
|---|---|---|---|---|---|---|---|---|---|---|---|---|
| Barnoldswick Town | 2012–13 | NWCFL Premier Division | 16 | 0 | 1 | 0 | — | | 4 (Note: One appearance in FA Vase, one appearance in NWCFL Challenge Cup, two appearances in West Riding County Cup) | 0 | 21 | 0 |
| Wigan Athletic | 2013–14 | Championship | 0 | 0 | 0 | 0 | 0 | 0 | 0 | 0 | 0 | 0 |
| Doncaster Rovers | 2014–15 | League One | 3 | 0 | 1 | 0 | 0 | 0 | 0 | 0 | 4 | 0 |
| Doncaster Rovers | 2015–16 | League One | 1 | 0 | 0 | 0 | 0 | 0 | 1 (Note: Appearance in Football League Trophy / EFL Trophy) | 0 | 2 | 0 |
| Doncaster Rovers | 2016–17 | League Two | 25 | 0 | 1 | 0 | 1 | 0 | 2 | 0 | 29 | 0 |
| Doncaster Rovers | 2017–18 | League One | 13 | 0 | 0 | 0 | 1 | 0 | 4 | 0 | 18 | 0 |
| Doncaster Rovers | 2018–19 | League One | 36 | 0 | 2 | 0 | 1 | 0 | 3 (Note: One appearance in EFL Trophy, two appearances in League One play-offs) | 0 | 42 | 0 |
| Doncaster Rovers | Total | | 78 | 0 | 4 | 0 | 3 | 0 | 10 | 0 | 95 | 0 |
| Coventry City | 2019–20 | League One | 34 | 0 | 6 | 0 | 0 | 0 | 0 | 0 | 40 | 0 |
| Coventry City | 2020–21 | Championship | 20 | 0 | 0 | 0 | 1 | 0 | — | | 21 | 0 |
| Coventry City | Total | | 54 | 0 | 6 | 0 | 1 | 0 | 0 | 0 | 61 | 0 |
| Shrewsbury Town | 2021–22 | League One | 46 | 0 | 2 | 0 | 2 | 0 | 0 | 0 | 50 | 0 |
| Shrewsbury Town | 2022–23 | League One | 44 | 0 | 3 | 0 | 2 | 0 | 0 | 0 | 49 | 0 |
| Shrewsbury Town | 2023–24 | League One | 43 | 0 | 3 | 0 | 1 | 0 | 1 | 0 | 48 | 0 |
| Shrewsbury Town | Total | | 133 | 0 | 8 | 0 | 5 | 0 | 1 | 0 | 147 | 0 |
| Plymouth Argyle | 2024–25 | Championship | 0 | 0 | 0 | 0 | — | | — | | 0 | 0 |
| Cambridge United | 2024–25 | League One | 2 | 0 | — | | — | | — | | 2 | 0 |
| Port Vale | 2025–26 | League One | 5 | 0 | 0 | 0 | 1 | 0 | 1 | 0 | 7 | 0 |
| Port Vale | 2026–27 | League Two | 8 | 0 | 1 | 0 | 0 | 0 | 2 | 0 | 11 | 0 |
| Port Vale | Total | | 13 | 0 | 1 | 0 | 1 | 0 | 3 | 0 | 18 | 0 |
| Tranmere Rovers (loan) | 2025–26 | League Two | 16 | 0 | — | | — | | — | | 16 | 0 |
| Career total | | | 312 | 0 | 20 | 0 | 10 | 0 | 18 | 0 | 360 | 0 |

== Honours ==
Doncaster Rovers

- EFL League Two third-place promotion: 2016–17

Coventry City

- EFL League One: 2019–20

Individual

- PFA Team of the Year: 2019–20 League One
