= Tyler Garratt =

English footballer

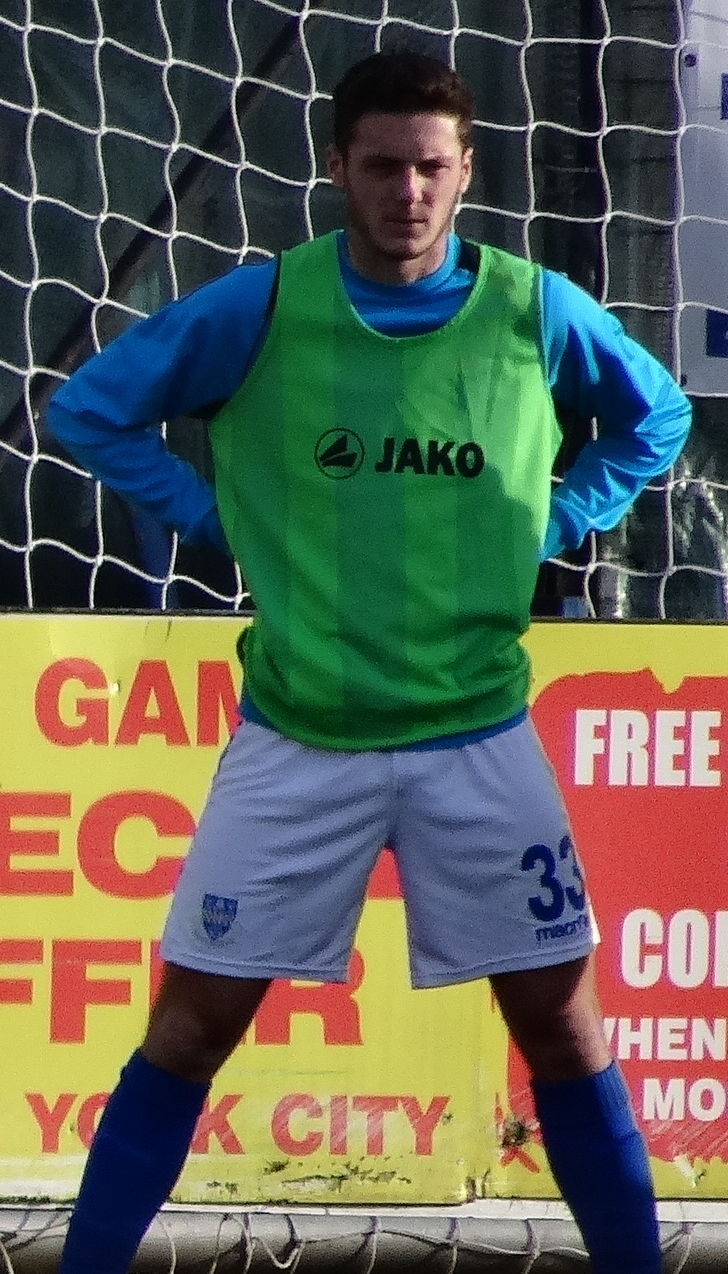
- Garratt with Eastleigh in 2017

Personal information
- Full name: Tyler John Garratt
- Date of birth: 26 October 1996 (age 30)
- Place of birth: Lincoln, England
- Height: 1.82 m (6 ft 0 in)
- Position: Defender

Team information
- Current team: Lions Gibraltar
- Number: 4

Youth career
- 2006–2011: Lincoln City
- 2011–2013: Costa Unida CF
- 2013–2016: Bolton Wanderers

Senior career*
Years	Team	Apps	(Gls)
2016	Bolton Wanderers	3	(0)
2016–2019	Doncaster Rovers	15	(0)
2016–2017	→ Eastleigh (loan)	11	(1)
2018–2019	→ AFC Wimbledon (loan)	6	(0)
2019–2020	Stockport County	12	(0)
2020	→ Wrexham (loan)	3	(0)
2020–2021	Chorley	9	(0)
2021	Bangor City	12	(0)
2021–2022	Cefn Druids	12	(0)
2023	Flint Town United	18	(0)
2023–2025	Europa Point	41	(0)
2025–	Lions Gibraltar	29	(0)
- * Club domestic league appearances and goals as of 8 November 2026

Tyler John Garratt (born 26 October 1996) is an English professional footballer who plays as a defender for Gibraltar Football League side Lions Gibraltar.

== Early life ==
Garratt was born in Lincoln and joined Bolton Wanderers in 2013.

== Club career ==
Garratt has been with Bolton Wanderers since the youth team and made his first team debut on 23 April 2016, coming on as a substitute for Darren Pratley at Cardiff City in the Football League Championship, giving away a last minute penalty in their 2–1 loss. He made his first start the following week in the team's 1–0 home victory over Hull City.

On 28 June 2016, Garratt joined Doncaster Rovers for an undisclosed fee.

On 2 August 2018, Garratt joined fellow League One side AFC Wimbledon on a season-long loan deal. He scored his first goal for Wimbledon in an EFL Trophy tie against Stevenage on 6 November 2018.

He was released by Doncaster at the end of the 2018–19 season.

On 11 October 2019, Garratt signed for Stockport County on a short team deal. On 7 February 2020, he was loaned out to Wrexham until the end of the 2019–20 season.

He signed for Bangor City for the 2021–22 season. In November 2021 he moved to Cefn Druids.

== Career statistics ==
=== Club ===
As of 22 September 2021

Club	Season	League			National Cup		League Cup		Other		Total	
Club	Season	Division	Apps	Goals	Apps	Goals	Apps	Goals	Apps	Goals	Apps	Goals
Bolton Wanderers	2015–16	Championship	3	0	0	0	0	0	–		3	0
Doncaster Rovers	2016–17	League Two	2	0	1	0	1	0	3 (Note: Appearances in the Football League Trophy.)	0	7	0
Doncaster Rovers	2017–18	League One	13	0	2	0	2	0	4	0	21	0
Doncaster Rovers	2018–19	League One	0	0	0	0	0	0	0	0	0	0
Doncaster Rovers	Total		15	0	3	0	3	0	7	0	28	0
Eastleigh (loan)	2016–17	National League	11	1	0	0	–		0	0	11	1
AFC Wimbledon (loan)	2018–19	League One	6	0	1	0	2	0	4	1	13	1
Stockport County	2019–20	National League	11	0	0	0	–		2	0	13	0
Wrexham (loan)	2019–20	National League	3	0	0	0	–		0	0	3	0
Chorley	2020–21	National League North	9	0	0	0	–		1	0	10	0
Bangor City	2021–22	Cymru North	10	0	1	0	–		0	0	11	0
Career Total			68	1	5	0	5	0	14	1	91	2
