= Joe Pugh =

English footballer (born 1997)

Personal information
- Full name: Joseph Pugh
- Date of birth: 10 October 1997 (age 29)
- Place of birth: Doncaster, England
- Position: Forward

Youth career
- –2015: Hull City
- 2015–2016: Doncaster Rovers

Senior career*
Years	Team	Apps	(Gls)
2016–2017	Doncaster Rovers	0	(0)
2016	→ Hyde United (loan)	6	(1)
2016	→ Boston United (loan)	1	(0)
2017	→ Frickley Athletic (loan)	19	(1)
2017	North Ferriby United	10	(1)
2017–20??	Tadcaster Albion		
- Knaresborough Town
- Armthorpe Welfare
- Club Thorne Colliery
- * Club domestic league appearances and goals

Joseph Pugh (born 10 October 1997) is a footballer who plays as a forward.

He began his professional career with Doncaster Rovers.

== Early life ==
Pugh is the son of former midfielder Daral Pugh. He was initially enrolled in Hull City academy, but moved to Doncaster Rovers to play for his local team and in a bid to start enjoying his football again.

== Club career ==
Pugh was an unused substitute for Doncaster Rovers on 8 May 2016, in a League One match against Burton Albion at the Keepmoat Stadium. His first appearance came from the bench in an EFL Trophy match against Mansfield Town which Rovers won 2–0. He has had loan spells at Hyde United, Boston United and Frickley Athletic. He was released following a disappointing campaign.

He signed for North Ferriby United on 26 June 2017.

Pugh signed for Knaresborough Town in October 2020.

He joined Armthorpe Welfare in January 2022, and became a player-coach there in April 2022.

He joined Club Thorne Colliery in summer 2023.

== International career ==
Pugh is eligible for both England and Wales.

In March 2012 he took part in a Wales under 16 training camp.

== Career statistics ==
As of 9 February 2018

Appearances and goals by club, season and competition
Club	Season	League			FA Cup		League Cup		Other		Total	
Club	Season	Division	Apps	Goals	Apps	Goals	Apps	Goals	Apps	Goals	Apps	Goals
Doncaster Rovers	2016–17	League Two	0	0	0	0	0	0	1 (Note: Appearance(s) in EFL Trophy)	0	1	0
Hyde United (loan)	2016–17	NPL Division One North	6	1	1	0	–		2 (Note: Appearance(s) in Manchester Premier Cup)	1	9	2
Boston United (loan)	2016–17	National League North	1	0	–		–		0	0	1	0
Frickley Athletic (loan)	2016–17	NPL Premier Division	19	1	–		–		3 (Note: Appearance(s) in Sheffield & Hallamshire Senior Cup)	2	22	3
North Ferriby United	2017–18	National League North	10	1	0	0	–		1 (Note: Appearance(s) in FA Trophy)	0	11	1
Tadcaster Albion	2017–18	NPL Division One North	5	2	–		1	1	1 (Note: Appearance(s) in West Riding County Cup)	0	7	3
Career total			22	4	1	0	1	1	3	0	51	9
