= 2016–17 Doncaster Rovers F.C. season =

Doncaster Rovers
2016–17 season
- Chairman: David Blunt
- Manager: Darren Ferguson
- Stadium: Keepmoat Stadium
- League Two: 3rd (promoted)
- FA Cup: First round (vs. Oldham Athletic)
- League Cup: First round (vs. Nottingham Forest)
- EFL Cup: Second round (vs. Blackpool)
- Top goalscorer: League: John Marquis (26); All: John Marquis (26)
- Highest home attendance: 10,084 vs Grimsby Town (League Two, 17 Dec 16)
- Lowest home attendance: 1,495 vs Port Vale (EFL Trophy, 8 Nov 16)
- Average home league attendance: 6,021
Home colours	Away colours

The 2016–17 season was Doncaster Rovers's 138th season in their existence, 14th consecutive season in the Football League and first back in League Two following relegation last season. Along with League Two, the club also participated in the FA Cup, League Cup and League Trophy.

The season covered the period from 1 July 2016 to 30 June 2017.

== Squad ==
=== Detailed Overview ===
Caps and goals up to the start of season 2016–17. Players in bold left during the season.

No.	Name	Position (s)	Nationality	Place of birth	Date of birth (age)	Club caps	Club goals	Int. caps	Int. goals	Signed from
Goalkeepers
1	Ross Etheridge	GK	(England)	Chesterfield	14 September 1994 (age 32)	–	–	–	–	Accrington Stanley
13	Marko Maroši	GK	(Slovakia)	Michalovce, Slovakia	23 October 1993 (age 33)	6	0	–	–	Wigan Athletic
38	Ian Lawlor	GK	(Republic of Ireland)	Dublin	27 October 1994 (age 32)	–	–	–	–	Manchester City
Defenders
2	Craig Alcock	RB/LB/CB	(England)	Truro	8 December 1987 (age 38)	29	0	–	–	Sheffield United
3	Tyler Garratt	LB/CB	(England)	Lincoln	26 October 1996 (age 30)	–	–	–	–	Bolton Wanderers
4	Luke McCullough	CB/RB/DM	(Northern Ireland)	Portadown	15 February 1994 (age 32)	91	1	5	0	Manchester United
5	Mathieu Baudry	CB/DM	(France)	Le Havre	24 February 1988 (age 38)	–	–	–	–	Leyton Orient
6	Andy Butler	CB	(England)	Doncaster	4 November 1983 (age 43)	85	7	–	–	Sheffield United
12	Mitchell Lund	RB	(England)	Leeds	27 August 1996 (age 30)	39	2	–	–	Academy
15	Joe Wright	CB	(Wales)	Monk Fryston, England	26 February 1995 (age 31)	–	–	–	–	Huddersfield Town
20	Aaron Taylor-Sinclair	LB/LM	(Scotland)	Aberdeen	8 April 1991 (age 35)	49	2	–	–	Wigan Athletic
	**Frazer Richardson**	**RB/LB**	**(England)**	**Rotherham**	**29 October 1982 (age 44)**	–	–	–	–	**Rotherham United**
27	Cedric Evina	LB/LM	(France)	Cameroon	16 November 1991 (age 34)	73	1	–	–	Charlton Athletic
29	Reece Fielding	CB	(England)	Doncaster	23 October 1998 (age 28)	–	–	–	–	Academy
30	Danny Amos		(England)	Sheffield	20 May 1999 (age 27)	–	–	–	–	Academy
34	Morgan James		(England)	Rotherham	27 August 1999 (age 27)	–	–	–	–	Academy
Midfielders
10	Tommy Rowe	LM/LB/CM	(England)	Wythenshawe	1 May 1989 (age 37)	10	3	–	–	Wolverhampton Wanderers
14	Harry Middleton	CM/AM	(England)	Doncaster	12 April 1995 (age 31)	48	0	–	–	Academy
17	Matty Blair	CM/RW/LW	(England)	Warwick	21 June 1989 (age 37)	–	–	–	–	Mansfield Town
18	Paul Keegan	CM	(Republic of Ireland)	Dublin	5 July 1984 (age 42)	135	2	–	–	(Republic of Ireland) Bohemians
26	James Coppinger	RM/CM/RB	(England)	Guisborough	10 January 1981 (age 45)	493	50	–	–	Exeter City
	Joey McCormick	CM			Age 18	–	–	–	–	Academy
	Tony Donaldson	CM	(England)		Age 18	–	–	–	–	Runcorn Linnets
Forwards
7	Gary McSheffrey	LW/AM/SS	(England)	Coventry	13 August 1982 (age 44)	7	1	–	–	Scunthorpe United
9	John Marquis	CF/LW	(England)	Lewisham	16 May 1992 (age 34)	–	–	–	–	Millwall
11	Andy Williams	CF/RW	(England)	Hereford	14 August 1986 (age 40)	53	16	–	–	Swindon Town
19	Liam Mandeville	CF	(England)	Lincoln	17 February 1997 (age 29)	13	1	–	–	Academy
21	Joe Pugh	CF/CB	(Wales)	Doncaster, England	10 October 1997 (age 29)	0	0	–	–	Academy
22	Will Longbottom	CF	(England)	Leeds	14 September 1994 (age 32)	1	0	–	–	Academy
23	Alfie Beestin	CF	(England)	Leeds	1 October 1997 (age 29)	–	–	–	–	Tadcaster Albion
35	Lewis Scattergood		(England)	Worksop	20 March 1999 (age 27)	–	–	–	–	Academy
	**Dany N'Guessan**	**CF/LW/RW**	**(France)**	**Ivry-sur-Seine**	**11 August 1987 (age 39)**	**9**	**0**	–	–	**(Greece) AEL**

=== Statistics ===
This includes any players featured in a match day squad in any competition.

As of 12 May 2017

No.	Pos	Nat	Player	Total		League Two		FA Cup		League Cup		League Trophy	
No.	Pos	Nat	Player	Apps	Goals	Apps	Goals	Apps	Goals	Apps	Goals	Apps	Goals
1	GK	(England) ENG	Ross Etheridge	8	0	3+3	0	0	0	0	0	2	0
2	DF	(England) ENG	Craig Alcock	29	0	24+3	0	1	0	0	0	1	0
3	DF	(England) ENG	Tyler Garratt	7	0	1+1	0	1	0	1	0	2+1	0
4	DF	(Northern Ireland) NIR	Luke McCullough	7	0	6+1	0	0	0	0	0	0	0
5	DF	(France) FRA	Mathieu Baudry	35	5	26+5	5	1	0	0	0	2+1	0
6	DF	(England) ENG	Andy Butler	46	3	44	3	0+1	0	1	0	0	0
7	FW	(England) ENG	Gary McSheffrey	12	0	3+9	0	0	0	0	0	0	0
8	MF	(England) ENG	Riccardo Calder (on loan from Aston Villa)	20	1	5+10	0	0	0	0+1	0	4	1
9	FW	(England) ENG	John Marquis	48	26	45	26	1	0	1	0	1	0
10	MF	(England) ENG	Tommy Rowe	47	13	46	13	0	0	1	0	0	0
11	FW	(England) ENG	Andy Williams	40	12	25+12	11	0	0	1	0	2	1
12	DF	(England) ENG	Mitchell Lund	6	0	4+2	0	0	0	0	0	0	0
13	GK	(Slovakia) SVK	Marko Maroši	29	0	24+1	0	1	0	1	0	2	0
14	MF	(England) ENG	Harry Middleton	30	0	6+19	0	1	0	1	0	3	0
15	DF	(Wales) WAL	Joe Wright	27	0	18+4	0	1	0	1	0	3	0
16	MF	(England) ENG	Jordan Houghton (on loan from Chelsea)	36	1	32	1	0	0	1	0	1+2	0
17	MF	(England) ENG	Matty Blair	48	3	45	3	1	0	1	0	1	0
18	MF	(Ireland) EIR	Paul Keegan	10	0	0+6	0	0+1	0	0	0	3	0
19	FW	(England) ENG	Liam Mandeville	27	10	9+12	7	1	1	0+1	1	3+1	1
20	DF	(Scotland) SCO	Aaron Taylor-Sinclair	4	0	1+3	0	0	0	0	0	0	0
21	FW	(Wales) WAL	Joe Pugh	1	0	0	0	0	0	0	0	0+1	0
22	FW	(England) ENG	Will Longbottom	7	1	0+3	0	0	0	0	0	2+2	1
23	FW	(England) ENG	Alfie Beestin	8	1	0+3	0	1	0	0	0	4	1
24	DF	(England) ENG	Niall Mason (on loan from Aston Villa)	42	0	37+1	0	0	0	1	0	3	0
25	DF	(England) ENG	Frazer Richardson	6	0	3+1	0	1	0	0	0	0+1	0
25	MF	(England) ENG	Conor Grant (on loan from Everton)	21	1	20+1	1	0	0	0	0	0	0
26	MF	(England) ENG	James Coppinger	39	10	38+1	10	0	0	0	0	0	0
27	DF	(France) FRA	Cedric Evina	21	0	13+3	0	0+1	0	0	0	4	0
29	DF	(England) ENG	Reece Fielding	2	0	0	0	0	0	0	0	1+1	0
30	DF	(England) ENG	Danny Amos	1	0	0	0	0	0	0	0	0+1	0
32	DF	(England) ENG	Joshua Barker	0	0	0	0	0	0	0	0	0	0
33	GK	(England) ENG	Louis Jones	0	0	0	0	0	0	0	0	0	0
34	DF	(England) ENG	Morgan James	0	0	0	0	0	0	0	0	0	0
35	FW	(England) ENG	Lewis Scattergood	0	0	0	0	0	0	0	0	0	0
36	DF	(England) ENG	Tyler Walker	0	0	0	0	0	0	0	0	0	0
37	MF	(England) ENG	Jacob Fletcher	0	0	0	0	0	0	0	0	0	0
38	GK	(England) ENG	Ian Lawlor	19	0	19	0	0	0	0	0	0	0
39	FW	(England) ENG	Alfie May	16	3	9+7	3	0	0	0	0	0	0

==== Goals record ====
As of 12 May 2017.

Rank	No.	Po.	Name	League Two	FA Cup	League Cup	League Trophy	Total
1	9	FW	John Marquis	26	0	0	0	26
2	10	MF	Tommy Rowe	13	0	0	0	13
3	11	FW	Andy Williams	11	0	0	1	12
4	26	MF	James Coppinger	10	0	0	0	10
5	19	FW	Liam Mandeville	7	1	1	1	10
6	5	DF	Mathieu Baudry	5	0	0	0	5
7	17	MF	Matty Blair	3	0	0	0	3
7	6	DF	Andy Butler	3	0	0	0	3
7	39	FW	Alfie May	3	0	0	0	3
10	16	MF	Jordan Houghton	1	0	0	0	1
10	25	MF	Conor Grant	1	0	0	0	1
10	8	MF	Riccardo Calder	0	0	0	1	1
10	22	FW	Will Longbottom	0	0	0	1	1
10	23	FW	Alfie Beestin	0	0	0	1	1
-			Own goal	2	0	0	0	2
Total				85	1	1	5	92

==== Disciplinary record ====
As of 12 May 2017.

No.	Pos.	Name	League Two			FA Cup			League Cup			League Trophy			Total		
No.	Pos.	Name	Yellow card	(yellow card) (yellow-red card)	Red card	Yellow card	(yellow card) (yellow-red card)	Red card	Yellow card	(yellow card) (yellow-red card)	Red card	Yellow card	(yellow card) (yellow-red card)	Red card	Yellow card	(yellow card) (yellow-red card)	Red card
2	DF	Craig Alcock	2	0	0	0	0	0	0	0	0	0	0	0	2	0	0
4	MF	Luke McCullough	3	0	0	0	0	0	0	0	0	0	0	0	3	0	0
5	DF	Mathieu Baudry	8	0	0	0	0	0	0	0	0	0	0	0	8	0	0
6	DF	Andy Butler	11	0	0	0	0	0	0	0	0	0	0	0	11	0	0
7	MF	Gary McSheffrey	1	0	0	0	0	0	0	0	0	0	0	0	1	0	0
8	MF	Riccardo Calder	1	0	0	0	0	0	0	0	0	0	0	0	1	0	0
9	FW	John Marquis	9	0	0	0	0	0	0	0	0	0	0	0	9	0	0
10	MF	Tommy Rowe	4	0	0	0	0	0	0	0	0	0	0	0	4	0	0
11	FW	Andy Williams	4	0	0	0	0	0	0	0	0	0	0	0	4	0	0
13	GK	Marko Maroši	2	0	0	0	0	0	0	0	0	0	0	0	2	0	0
14	MF	Harry Middleton	1	0	0	0	0	0	0	0	0	0	0	0	1	0	0
15	DF	Joe Wright	7	0	0	0	0	0	0	0	0	2	0	0	9	0	0
16	MF	Jordan Houghton	3	0	0	0	0	0	0	0	0	1	0	0	4	0	0
17	MF	Matty Blair	5	1	0	0	0	0	0	0	0	0	0	0	5	1	0
18	MF	Paul Keegan	0	0	0	0	0	0	0	0	0	1	0	0	1	0	0
19	FW	Liam Mandeville	3	0	0	0	0	0	0	0	0	1	0	0	4	0	0
22	MF	Will Longbottom	0	0	0	0	0	0	0	0	0	1	0	0	1	0	0
24	DF	Niall Mason	7	0	0	0	0	0	0	0	0	0	0	0	7	0	0
26	MF	James Coppinger	2	0	1	0	0	0	0	0	0	0	0	0	2	0	1
27	DF	Cedric Evina	2	0	0	0	0	0	0	0	0	0	0	0	2	0	0
29	DF	Reece Fielding	0	0	0	0	0	0	0	0	0	1	0	0	1	0	0
38	GK	Ian Lawlor	2	0	0	0	0	0	0	0	0	0	0	0	2	0	0
39	FW	Alfie May	3	0	0	0	0	0	0	0	0	0	0	0	3	0	0
Total			80	1	1	0	0	0	0	0	0	7	0	0	87	1	1

== Transfers ==
=== Transfers in ===
Date from	Position	Nationality	Name	From	Fee	Ref.
18 May 2016	MF	(England)	Tommy Rowe	Wolverhampton Wanderers	Undisclosed	
24 May 2016	MF	(England)	Matty Blair	Mansfield Town	Free transfer	
25 May 2016	GK	(England)	Ross Etheridge	Accrington Stanley	Free transfer	
27 May 2016	DF	(France)	Mathieu Baudry	Leyton Orient	Free transfer	
1 June 2016	DF	(Wales)	Joe Wright	Huddersfield Town	Free transfer	
6 June 2016	FW	(England)	Gary McSheffrey	Scunthorpe United	Free transfer	
13 June 2016	FW	(England)	John Marquis	Millwall	Free transfer	
28 June 2016	DF	(England)	Tyler Garratt	Bolton Wanderers	Undisclosed	
2 August 2016	FW	(England)	Alfie Beestin	Tadcaster Albion	Undisclosed	
30 August 2016	DF	(England)	Frazer Richardson	Rotherham United	Free transfer	
1 January 2017	ST	(England)	Alfie May	Hythe Town	Undisclosed	
4 January 2017	MF	(England)	Tony Donaldson	Runcorn Linnets	Undisclosed	
13 January 2017	GK	(Republic of Ireland)	Ian Lawlor	Manchester City	Undisclosed	

=== Transfers out ===
Date from	Position	Nationality	Name	To	Fee	Ref.
17 May 2016	MF	(England)	Matty Davies	Free agent	Released	
8 June 2016	DF	(England)	Ben Askins	Whitby Town	Free transfer	
21 June 2016	DF	(Scotland)	Gary MacKenzie	(Scotland) St Mirren	Free transfer	
30 June 2016	DF	(England)	Michael Carberry			
30 June 2016	MF	(England)	Jordan Linley	Free agent	Released	
30 June 2016	DF	(Democratic Republic of the Congo)	Kevin M'buti	(Australia) Adelaide Comets	Free transfer	
4 July 2016	FW	(England)	Curtis Main	Portsmouth	Undisclosed	
29 July 2016	MF	(England)	Richard Chaplow	(United States) Orange County Blues	Free transfer	
2 August 2016	MF	(England)	Billy Whitehouse	Leeds United	Undisclosed	
12 September 2016	FW	(England)	Nathan Tyson	(Scotland) Kilmarnock	Free transfer	
16 September 2016	GK	(Germany)	Thorsten Stuckmann	(Scotland) Partick Thistle	Free transfer	
27 October 2016	FW	(France)	Dany N'Guessan	Free agent	Mutual agreement	
3 January 2017	DF	(England)	Frazer Richardson	Free agent	Released	

=== Loans in ===
Date from	Position	Nationality	Name	From	Date until	Ref.
12 July 2016	MF	(England)	Riccardo Calder	Aston Villa	2 January 2017	
6 August 2016	MF	(England)	Jordan Houghton	Chelsea	End of season (Note: On 1 January 2017, Jordan Houghton's loan from Chelsea was extended until the end of the season.)	
6 August 2016	DF	(England)	Niall Mason	Aston Villa	End of season (Note: On 29 December 2016, Niall Mason's loan from Aston Villa was extended until the end of the season.)	
2 January 2017	MF	(England)	Conor Grant	Everton	End of season	

=== Loans out ===
Date from	Position	Nationality	Name	To	Date until	Ref.
16 September 2016	FW	(England)	Joe Pugh	Hyde United	15 October 2016	
16 December 2016	GK	(England)	Ross Etheridge	Alfreton Town	4 January 2017	
2 January 2017	FW	(England)	Joe Pugh	Frickley Athletic	2 February 2017	
7 January 2016	MF	(England)	Tony Donaldson	AFC Telford United	4 February 2017	
25 February 2017	MF	(England)	Tony Donaldson	Burscough	22 April 2017	

== Competitions ==
=== Pre–season friendlies ===
12 July 2016 Friendly	Rossington Main	0–4	Doncaster Rovers	Doncaster
19:45 BST		Report	Coppinger 15'; Longbottom 23'; Rowe 47'; Williams 83'	Stadium: Oxford Street; Attendance: 1,425

16 July 2016 Friendly	Doncaster Rovers	0–2	Middlesbrough	Doncaster
15:00 BST		Report	Downing 13'; Pattison 82'	Stadium: Keepmoat Stadium; Attendance: 2,886

20 July 2016 Friendly	Doncaster Rovers	2–2	Newcastle United	Doncaster
19:45 BST	Williams 19', 45+4'	Report	Hayden 51'; Pérez 90+2'	Stadium: Keepmoat Stadium; Attendance: 5,698

26 July 2016 Friendly	York City	1–2	Doncaster Rovers	York
19:00 BST	Fenwick 32'	Report	Rowe 21'; Blair 67'	Stadium: Bootham Crescent; Attendance: 883

=== League Two ===
==== League table ====
Pos	Team	Pld	W	D	L	GF	GA	GD	Pts	Promotion, qualification or relegation
1	Portsmouth (C, P)	46	26	9	11	79	40	+39	87	Promotion to EFL League One
2	Plymouth Argyle (P)	46	26	9	11	71	46	+25	87	Promotion to EFL League One
3	Doncaster Rovers (P)	46	25	10	11	85	55	+30	85	Promotion to EFL League One
4	Luton Town	46	20	17	9	70	43	+27	77	Qualification for League Two play-offs (Note: Four teams play for one spot and promotion to EFL League One)
5	Exeter City	46	21	8	17	75	56	+19	71	Qualification for League Two play-offs

Updated to match(es) played on 6 May 2017. Source: BBC Sport
Rules for classification: 1) Points; 2) Goal difference; 3) Number of goals scored
(C) Champions; (P) Promoted

==== Matches ====
Football League fixtures for the 2016–17 season were released on 22 June 2016.

6 August 2016 1	Accrington Stanley	3–2	Doncaster Rovers	Accrington
15:00 BST	Boco 8'; Brown (yellow card) 24'; Pearson 29'; Donacien (yellow card) 51'; McCartan (yellow card) 89'; McConville 90+1'	Report	Rowe 12'; Calder (yellow card) 43'; Williams 82'; Mandeville (yellow card) 86'	Stadium: Crown Ground; Attendance: 2,647; Referee: Seb Stockbridge

13 August 2016 2	Doncaster Rovers	1–1	Crawley Town	Doncaster
15:00 BST	Coppinger 49'; Houghton (yellow card) 83'	Report	Collins 26'; Davey (yellow card) 89'; Smith (yellow card) 90+2'; Blackman (yellow card) 90+5'	Stadium: Keepmoat Stadium; Attendance: 4,327; Referee: Brett Huxtable

16 August 2016 3	Doncaster Rovers	1–0	Cambridge United	Doncaster
19:45 BST	Butler (yellow card) 53'; Coppinger (yellow card) 55'; Marquis 74'; Wright (yellow card) 89'	Report	Norris (yellow card) 2'; Coulson (yellow card) 23'; Pigott (yellow card) 88'	Stadium: Keepmoat Stadium; Attendance: 4,768; Referee: Darren Handley

20 August 2016 4	Cheltenham Town	0–1	Doncaster Rovers	Cheltenham
15:00 BST	Suliman (yellow card) 18'; Jennings (yellow card) 81'	Report	Marquis 53'; Maroši (yellow card) 57'; Houghton (yellow card) 79'; Butler (yellow card) 83'	Stadium: Whaddon Road; Attendance: 2,923; Referee: Mark Heywood

27 August 2016 5	Doncaster Rovers	4–1	Yeovil Town	Doncaster
15:00 BST	Williams 1', 82', 90+1'; Coppinger 54', (yellow card) 66'	Report	Dawson (yellow card) 54'; Hedges 55'; Mugabi (yellow card) 76' (yellow-red card); Dolan (yellow card) 85'	Stadium: Keepmoat Stadium; Attendance: 4,686; Referee: Michael Salisbury

3 September 2016 6	Crewe Alexandra	2–1	Doncaster Rovers	Crewe
15:00 BST	Lowe 14'; Hollands (yellow card) 55'; Jones 87'	Report	Marquis (yellow card) 39'; Rowe 82' (pen.)	Stadium: Alexandra Stadium; Attendance: 3,830; Referee: Lee Probert

10 September 2016 7	Morecambe	1–5	Doncaster Rovers	Morecambe
15:00 BST	Kenyon (yellow card) 27'; Stockton 45'; Barkhuizen (yellow card) 51'; Rose (yellow card) 63'; Whitmore (red card) 84'	Report	Butler 4'; Marquis 17', 66', (yellow card) 49'; Blair 74'; Coppinger 80'	Stadium: Globe Arena; Attendance: 1,791; Referee: Ollie Yates

17 September 2016 8	Doncaster Rovers	2–0	Newport County	Doncaster
15:00 BST	Coppinger 17'; Butler (yellow card) 34'; Williams 59'; Wright (yellow card) 71'; Marquis (yellow card) 78'	Report	Parkin (yellow card) 45+2'; Turley (yellow card) 74'; Bennett (yellow card) 81'; Butler (yellow card) 83'	Stadium: Keepmoat Stadium; Attendance: 5,254; Referee: David Webb

24 September 2016 9	Luton Town	3–1	Doncaster Rovers	Luton
15:00 BST	McGeehan 36', 81' (pen.); Marriott 41'; Potts (yellow card) 90+3'; Hylton (yellow card) 90+5' (yellow-red card)	Report	Coppinger 21'; Evina (yellow card) 61'; Wright (yellow card) 80'	Stadium: Kenilworth Road; Attendance: 7,917; Referee: Andy Haines

27 September 2016 10	Doncaster Rovers	2–2	Carlisle United	Doncaster
19:45 BST	Rowe 18'; Marquis 44', (yellow card) 90+3'	Report	Miller 15'; Grainger (yellow card) 49'; Ibehre 79'	Stadium: Keepmoat Stadium; Attendance: 4,773; Referee: Ross Joyce

1 October 2016 11	Portsmouth	1–2	Doncaster Rovers	Portsmouth
15:00 BST	Evans (yellow card) 36'; Baker 41'	Report	Marquis 7', (yellow card) 90'; Williams 34'; Butler (yellow card) 58'; Evina (yellow card) 88'	Stadium: Fratton Park; Attendance: 16,950; Referee: Darren Deadman

8 October 2016 12	Doncaster Rovers	3–2	Barnet	Doncaster
15:00 BST	Coppinger 15'; Blair 32'; Rowe (yellow card) 81'; Williams (yellow card) 90+2', (goal) 90+2'	Report	Dembélé 63'; Gambin 86'	Stadium: Keepmoat Stadium; Attendance: 4,861; Referee: Trevor Kettle

15 October 2016 13	Doncaster Rovers	1–0	Colchester United	Doncaster
15:00 BST	Mason (yellow card) 19'; Rowe 45+1'; Blair (yellow card) 50'	Report	Brindley (yellow card) 23'; Slater (yellow card) 53'	Stadium: Keepmoat Stadium; Attendance: 5,007; Referee: Seb Stockbridge

22 October 2016 14	Blackpool	4–2	Doncaster Rovers	Blackpool
15:00 BST	Potts 25', 47' (yellow card) 35'; Mellor 39'; Vassell 48' (yellow card) 72'; Slocombe (yellow card) 87'	Report	Taylor 1' (o.g.); Rowe 66' (pen.); Mason (yellow card) 82'	Stadium: Bloomfield Road; Attendance: 3,623; Referee: Dean Whitestone

29 October 2016 15	Doncaster Rovers	2–2	Wycombe Wanderers	Doncaster
15:00 BST	Rowe 29'; Marquis 40'; Baudry (yellow card) 81'	Report	Bloomfield 19', 78'; De Havilland (yellow card) 75'; Harriman (yellow card) 87'	Stadium: Keepmoat Stadium; Attendance: 5,287; Referee: Lee Probert

12 November 2016 16	Exeter City	1–3	Doncaster Rovers	Exeter
15:00 GMT	Reid 51' (pen.)	Report	Maroši (yellow card) 50'; Baudry (yellow card) 53'; Mandeville 72' (yellow card) 90+2'; Rowe (yellow card) 74'; Marquis 77', 90'	Stadium: St. James' Park; Attendance: 3,540; Referee: Charles Breakspear

19 November 2016 17	Doncaster Rovers	2–1	Hartlepool United	Doncaster
15:00 GMT	Marquis 23' (yellow card) 86'; Mandeville 90'	Report	Amond 42' (pen.); Nsiala (yellow card) 86'	Stadium: Keepmoat Stadium; Attendance: 5,009; Referee: Mark Haywood

26 November 2016 18	Doncaster Rovers	3–1	Leyton Orient	Doncaster
15:00 GMT	Houghton 45+1'; Mandeville 59' (pen.), 66' (pen.)	Report	Kennedy 19'; Atangana (yellow card) 38'	Stadium: Keepmoat Stadium; Attendance: 5,135; Referee: Richard Jones

3 December 2016 19	Stevenage	3–4	Doncaster Rovers	Stevenage
15:00 GMT	McKirdy (yellow card) 22'; Lee (yellow card) 41'; Gorman (yellow card) 44'; Pett 61'; Franks 72'; Liburd 90'	Report	Marquis (yellow card) 12' (goal) 73'; Butler 28'; Mandeville 35'; Blair 39'	Stadium: The Lamex Stadium; Attendance: 2,705; Referee: Lee Collins

10 December 2016 20	Plymouth Argyle	2–0	Doncaster Rovers	Plymouth
15:00 GMT	Carey 33'; Jervis 63' (pen.); Smith (yellow card) 79'	Report	Mandeville (penalty missed) 89'; Coppinger (red card) 90'	Stadium: Home Park; Attendance: 8,575; Referee: Oliver Langford

17 December 2016 21	Doncaster Rovers	1–0	Grimsby Town	Doncaster
12:30 GMT	Mandeville 3'; Butler (yellow card) 45+1'	Report	Pearson (yellow card) 70'; Collins (yellow card) 86'; Berrett (yellow card) 89'	Stadium: Keepmoat Stadium; Attendance: 10,084; Referee: Richard Clark

26 December 2016 22	Notts County	0–1	Doncaster Rovers	Nottingham
15:00 GMT	Oliver (yellow card) 74'	Report	Williams 60' (yellow card) 86'; Mandeville (yellow card) 88'	Stadium: Meadow Lane Stadium; Attendance: 5,828; Referee: Darren Drysdale

31 December 2016 23	Mansfield Town	1–1	Doncaster Rovers	Mansfield
12:15 GMT	Pearce (yellow card) 48'; Green 59'	Report	Mandeville 77' (pen.)	Stadium: One Call Stadium; Attendance: 5,042; Referee: Peter Bankes

2 January 2017 24	Doncaster Rovers	1–0	Stevenage	Doncaster
15:00 GMT	Franks 85' (o.g.)	Report	Pett (yellow card) 20'; King (yellow card) 88'	Stadium: Keepmoat Stadium; Attendance: 5,604; Referee: Mark Brown

5 January 2017 25	Doncaster Rovers	3–1	Portsmouth	Doncaster
19:45 GMT	Marquis 5', 72'; Alcock (yellow card) 52'; Rowe 58'	Report	Burgess (yellow card) 34'; Evans (yellow card) 40'; Naismith 41'; Doyle (yellow card) 45+1'	Stadium: The Keepmoat Stadium; Attendance: 5,568; Referee: Jeremy Simpson

14 January 2017 26	Barnet	1–3	Doncaster Rovers	Canons Park, London
15:00 GMT	Akinde 13'; Champion (yellow card) 29'; Weston (yellow card) 37'; Campbell-Ryce (yellow card) 41'; Vilhete (yellow card) 73'; Nelson (yellow card) 90+3'	Report	Coppinger 18', 31'; Baudry (yellow card) 21'; Marquis 28'; Houghton (yellow card) 82'	Stadium: The Hive Stadium; Attendance: 2,582; Referee: John Brooks

21 January 2017 27	Doncaster Rovers	3–1	Crewe Alexandra	Doncaster
15:00 GMT	Grant 22'; Blair (yellow card) 51'; Marquis 56'; Rowe 68'; Williams (yellow card) 73'; Butler (yellow card) 83'	Report	Jones 32'; Ray (yellow card) 82'	Stadium: The Keepmoat Stadium; Attendance: 5,737; Referee: Andy Haines

28 January 2017 28	Yeovil Town	0–3	Doncaster Rovers	Yeovil
15:00 GMT	Butcher (yellow card) 30'	Report	Baudry 31' (yellow card) 78'; Marquis 35', 79'	Stadium: Huish Park; Attendance: 3,627; Referee: Lee Swabey

4 February 2017 29	Doncaster Rovers	1–1	Morecambe	Doncaster
15:00 GMT	Butler (yellow card) 51'; Marquis 56'; Mason (yellow card) 66'	Report	Murphy 24'; Edwards (yellow card) 75'	Stadium: Keepmoat Stadium; Attendance: 6,096; Referee: Eddie Ilderton

10 February 2017 30	Newport County	0–0	Doncaster Rovers	Newport
19:45 GMT	Jones (yellow card) 65'; Rose (yellow card) 68'; Butler (yellow card) 72'	Report	Wright (yellow card) 70'; Marquis (yellow card) 90'	Stadium: Rodney Parade; Attendance: 2,653; Referee: David Webb

14 February 2017 31	Carlisle United	2–1	Doncaster Rovers	Carlisle
19:45 GMT	Joyce (yellow card) 18'; Adams 34'; Gillesphey (yellow card) 55'; Mason 85' (o.g.)	Report	Blair (yellow card) 56'; Lawlor (yellow card) 82'; Rowe 90+5'	Stadium: Brunton Park; Attendance: 4,527; Referee: Tony Harrington

18 February 2017 32	Doncaster Rovers	1–1	Luton Town	Doncaster
15:00 GMT	Butler (yellow card) 15'; May 80'	Report	Cook 54'; Rea (yellow card) 66'	Stadium: Keepmoat Stadium; Attendance: 7,506; Referee: Darren Deadman

25 February 2017 33	Doncaster Rovers	2-2	Accrington Stanley	Doncaster
15:00 GMT	Rowe 20' (yellow card) 68'; Mason (yellow card) 42'; Marquis 58'	Report	McCartan 4' (yellow card) 42'; Hughes (yellow card) 67'; Edwards 81'; Pearson (yellow card) 86'	Stadium: Keepmoat Stadium; Attendance: 5,272; Referee: Robert Lewis

28 February 2017 34	Cambridge United	2–3	Doncaster Rovers	Cambridge
19:45 GMT	Legge (yellow card) 70'; Maris 78'; Berry 90+2'	Report	Rowe 18'; Baudry 23'; Marquis 71' (pen.)	Stadium: Abbey Stadium; Attendance: 4,236; Referee: Ross Joyce

4 March 2017 35	Crawley Town	0–0	Doncaster Rovers	Crawley
GMT	McNerney (yellow card) 54'; Smith (yellow card) 55'; Boldewijn (yellow card) 83'; Young (yellow card) 90+3'	Report	Baudry (yellow card) 63'; Alcock (yellow card) 90+3'	Stadium: Broadfield Stadium; Attendance: 2,417; Referee: Michael Salisbury

11 March 2017 36	Doncaster Rovers	2–0	Cheltenham Town	Doncaster
15:00 GMT	Butler 23'; Blair (yellow card) 53'; Marquis 81'	Report	Boyle (red card) 26'	Stadium: Keepmoat Stadium; Attendance: 5,737; Referee: Kevin Johnson

14 March 2017 37	Doncaster Rovers	3–1	Notts County	Doncaster
GMT	Coppinger 43'; Baudry 47'; Lawlor (yellow card) 66'; May (yellow card) 78'; Williams 90+5'	Report	Duffy 20'; Bola (yellow card) 71'; Tootle (yellow card) 90+1'	Stadium: Keepmoat Stadium; Attendance: 5,760; Referee: Nigel Miller

18 March 2017 38	Leyton Orient	1–4	Doncaster Rovers	Leyton, London
15:00 GMT	Parkes 44'; Massey (yellow card) 68'	Report	Rowe 36'; Marquis 55', 82'; Mason (yellow card) 67'; Baudry 86'	Stadium: Brisbane Road; Attendance: 4,791; Referee: Chris Sarginson

26 March 2017 39	Doncaster Rovers	0–1	Plymouth Argyle	Doncaster
14:45 GMT		Report	Bradley 50'	Stadium: Keepmoat Stadium; Attendance: 7,414; Referee: Oliver Langford

1 April 2017 40	Grimsby Town	1–5	Doncaster Rovers	Cleethorpes
13:00 GMT	Clements (yellow card) 6'; Dyson (yellow card) 22'; Jones 34'; Mills (yellow card) 65'	Report	Marquis 37', 43', 61'; Williams (yellow card) 49' (goal) 78'; May 88'	Stadium: Blundell Park; Attendance: 6,821; Referee: Graham Scott

8 April 2017 41	Doncaster Rovers	1–0	Mansfield Town	Doncaster
15:00 BST	Rowe 74'	Report	Green (yellow card) 57'	Stadium: Keepmoat Stadium; Attendance: 9,903; Referee: Dean Whitestone

14 April 2017 42	Colchester United	1–1	Doncaster Rovers	Colchester
15:00 BST	Dickenson 16'; James (yellow card) 48'; Eastman (yellow card) 71'	Report	Mason (yellow card) 31'; Blair (yellow card) 42'; Baudry 45+2'; May (yellow card) 90+5'	Stadium: Colchester Community Stadium; Attendance: 4,720; Referee: David Webb

17 April 2017 43	Doncaster Rovers	0–1	Blackpool	Doncaster
15:00 BST	Blair (yellow card) 4' (yellow-red card) 52'; Wright (yellow card) 35'; Baudry (yellow card) 87'; Marquis (yellow card) 90+7'	Report	Flores 90+1' (pen.)	Stadium: Keepmoat Stadium; Attendance: 6,914; Referee: Carl Boyeson

22 April 2017 44	Wycombe Wanderers	2–1	Doncaster Rovers	High Wycombe
15:00 BST	O'Nien 9', 32'; Jacobson (yellow card) 21'; Bloomfield (yellow card) 89'	Report	May 18'; Baudry (yellow card) 34'; Butler (yellow card) 65'; McCullough (yellow card) 90+8'	Stadium: Adams Park; Attendance: 4,587; Referee: Graham Horwood

29 April 2017 45	Doncaster Rovers	1–3	Exeter City	Doncaster
15:00 BST	Coppinger 26'; Butler (yellow card) 56'; McCullough (yellow card) 58'; Wright (yellow card) 59'; Mason (yellow card) 90+1'	Report	Moore-Taylor 16'; Wheeler 61'; McAlinden 86'	Stadium: Keepmoat Stadium; Attendance: 7,790; Referee: Charles Breakspear

6 May 2017 46	Hartlepool United	2–1	Doncaster Rovers	Victoria Park, Hartlepool
17:30 BST	Rodney 74', 83'; Magnay (yellow card) 82'	Report	Williams 31'; McCullough (yellow card) 36'; McSheffrey (yellow card) 95'; Wright (yellow card) 90+5'	Attendance: 6,799; Referee: Mark Brown

=== FA Cup ===
Doncaster were drawn against Oldham Athletic of League One in the first round on 17 October 2016.

5 November 2016 First round	Oldham Athletic	2–1	Doncaster Rovers	Oldham
15:00 GMT	Flynn 45+1'; Mckay 53'; Dummigan (yellow card) 84'	Report	Mandeville 90+4' (pen.)	Stadium: Boundary Park; Attendance: 2,984; Referee: David Webb

=== EFL Cup ===
The first round of the EFL Cup for 2016–17 saw fixtures drawn on 22 June 2016. Rovers were drawn against Championship side Nottingham Forest.

9 August 2016 First round	Doncaster Rovers	1–2	Nottingham Forest	Doncaster
19:45 BST	Mandeville 69'	Report	Vaughan 11'; Vellios (yellow card) 54'; Ward (yellow card) 68', (goal) 90+1'	Stadium: Keepmoat Stadium; Attendance: 5,160; Referee: Andy Haines

=== EFL Trophy ===
Following changes to the League Trophy, a group stage was introduced. Each group contains one Category One status academy and at least one team from each of League One and League Two, with the two highest placed teams qualifying for the next round. Doncaster were drawn in Northern Group E, alongside Derby County, Port Vale and Mansfield Town. Fixtures for the group stage were released on 27 July 2016.

Pos	Div	Team	Pld	W	PW	PL	L	GF	GA	GD	Pts	Qualification
1	L2	Doncaster Rovers	3	1	1	1	0	4	2	+2	6	Advance to Round 2
2	L2	Mansfield Town	3	2	0	0	1	4	4	0	6	Advance to Round 2
3	L1	Port Vale	3	1	1	0	1	1	1	0	5	
4	ACA	Derby County U21	3	0	0	1	2	4	6	−2	1	

Source: Sky Sports

30 August 2016 Group stage	Mansfield Town	0–2	Doncaster Rovers	Mansfield
19:45 BST		Report	Wright (yellow card) 23'; Houghton (yellow card) 36'; Beestin 72'; Calder 86'	Stadium: Field Mill; Attendance: 1,461; Referee: Neil Swarbrick

4 October 2016 Group stage	Doncaster Rovers	2–2 (4–2 p)	Derby County	Doncaster
19:45 BST	Wright (yellow card) 14'; Mandeville 53'; Keegan (yellow card) 64'; Longbottom 82'	Report	Wilson 8'; Rawson (yellow card) 88'; Weimann 90'	Stadium: Keepmoat Stadium; Attendance: 1,515; Referee: Carl Boyeson
	Penalties
	Middleton (penalty scored); Longbottom (penalty scored); Keegan (penalty scored); Marquis (penalty missed); Beestin (penalty scored)		Blackman (penalty scored); Guy (penalty scored); Alefe (penalty missed); Bennett (penalty missed)

8 November 2016 Group stage	Doncaster Rovers	0–0 (3–4 p)	Port Vale	Doncaster
GMT	Mandeville (yellow card) 20'; Longbottom (yellow card) 57'	Report	Smith (yellow card) 53'	Stadium: Keepmoat Stadium; Attendance: 1,495; Referee: Geoff Eltringham
	Penalties
	Houghton (penalty scored); Evina (penalty missed); Longbottom (penalty missed); Mandeville (penalty scored); Keegan (penalty scored)		Streete (penalty scored); Grant (penalty missed); Paulo Tavares (penalty scored); Leite Pereira (penalty scored); Hart (penalty scored)

6 December 2016 Second round	Doncaster Rovers	1–1 (7–8 p)	Blackpool	Doncaster
19:00 GMT	Williams 52'	Report	Gnanduillet 24'	Stadium: Keepmoat Stadium; Attendance: 1,549; Referee: David Coote
	Penalties
	Middleton (penalty scored); Beestin (penalty scored); Keegan (penalty scored); Mandeville (penalty scored); Houghton (penalty missed); Calder (penalty scored); Mason (penalty scored); Baudry (penalty scored); Longbottom (penalty missed)		Philliskirk (penalty scored); Cullen (penalty scored); Redshaw (penalty scored); Roache (penalty scored); Yeates (penalty missed); Nolan (penalty scored); Cameron (penalty scored); Aimson (penalty scored); Higham (penalty scored)

== Season summary ==
As of 22 May 2017

=== Detailed Summary ===
Results on penalties are given as draws.

Games played	52 (46 League Two, 1 FA Cup, 1 League Cup, 4 League Trophy)
Games won	26 (25 League Two, 0 FA Cup, 0 League Cup, 1 League Trophy)
Games drawn	13 (10 League Two, 0 FA Cup, 0 League Cup, 3 League Trophy)
Games lost	13 (11 League Two, 1 FA Cup, 1 League Cup, 0 League Trophy)
Goals scored	92 (85 League Two, 1 FA Cup, 1 League Cup, 5 League Trophy)
Goals conceded	63 (55 League Two, 2 FA Cup, 2 League Cup, 4 League Trophy)
Clean sheets	13 (12 League Two, 0 FA Cup, 0 League Cup, 1 League Trophy)
Yellow cards	87 (80 League Two, 0 FA Cup, 0 League Cup, 7 League Trophy)
Second yellow cards	1 (1 League Two, 0 FA Cup, 0 League Cup, 0 League Trophy)
Red cards	1 (1 League Two, 0 FA Cup, 0 League Cup, 0 League Trophy)
Worst discipline	Andy Butler (11 (yellow card) , 0 (yellow card) (yellow-red card) , 0 (red card) )
Best result	5–1 vs. Morecambe and Grimsby Town, both in League Two
Worst result	0–2 vs. Plymouth Argyle, 1–3 vs. Luton Town, Exeter City, 2–4 vs. Blackpool, all in League Two
Most appearances	48 John Marquis
Top scorer	26 John Marquis
League Two Goal Difference	30
League Two Points	85
FA Cup Goal Difference	–1
League Cup Goal Difference	–1
League Trophy Goal Difference	2
Overall Goal difference	85

=== Awards ===
- League Two Player of the Month (August): James Coppinger
- EFL Young Player of the Month (November): Liam Mandeville
- League Two Manager of the Month (January): Darren Ferguson
- League Two Player of the Season: John Marquis
- Football Manager League Two Team of the Season:
  - Manager: Darren Ferguson
  - James Coppinger
  - John Marquis
- Football Manager EFL Team of the Season:
  - Manager: Darren Ferguson
- PFA Player in the Community: Andy Butler
- EFL Supporter of the Year: Paul Mayfield
