= Kelechi Etienne =

English footballer

Personal information
- Date of birth: 2003 (age 22–23)
- Positions: Defender; midfielder

Team information
- Current team: Northwood

Youth career
- Fulham
- Shrewsbury Town

Senior career*
Years	Team	Apps	(Gls)
2022–2023	Shrewsbury Town	0	(0)
2023	Hadley	1	(0)
2023–2024	Colney Heath	14	(2)
2024	Rayners Lane	0	(0)
2024–	Northwood	10	(1)
- * Club domestic league appearances and goals as of 10:47, 30 November 2024(UTC)

Kelechi Etienne is an English professional footballer who plays as a defender or midfielder for Southern Football League side Northwood.

== Career ==
After a spell with Fulham as a youth, Etienne made his senior debut for Shrewsbury Town on 30 August 2022, coming on as a 33rd-minute substitute for Harvey Watts in a 2–1 defeat to Wolverhampton Wanderers U21 at the New Meadow.

Etienne then dropped into non-league, firstly with Hadley, Colney Heath and Rayners Lane, before joining Northwood early into the 2024–25 season.

== Career statistics ==
As of match played 20 September 2022

Appearances and goals by club, season and competition
Club	Season	League			FA Cup		EFL Cup		Other		Total	
Club	Season	Division	Apps	Goals	Apps	Goals	Apps	Goals	Apps	Goals	Apps	Goals
Shrewsbury Town	2022–23	League One	0	0	0	0	0	0	2 (Note: Appearances in the EFL Trophy)	1	2	1
Shrewsbury Town	2023–24	League One	0	0	0	0	0	0	0	0	0	0
Shrewsbury Town	Total		0	0	0	0	0	0	2	1	2	1
Career total			0	0	0	0	0	0	2	1	2	1
