= 2022–23 Shrewsbury Town F.C. season =

Shrewsbury Town
2022–23 season
- Chairman: Roland Wycherley
- Manager: Steve Cotterill
- Stadium: New Meadow
- League One: 12th
- FA Cup: Third round
- EFL Cup: Second round
- EFL Trophy: Group stage
- Highest home attendance: 8,457(vs Sheff Wed)
- Lowest home attendance: 4,803(vs Exeter)
- Average home league attendance: 6,430

The 2022–23 season is the 137th season in the existence of Shrewsbury Town Football Club and the club's eighth consecutive season in League One. In addition to the league, they will also compete in the 2022–23 FA Cup, the 2022–23 EFL Cup and the 2022–23 EFL Trophy.

== Transfers ==
=== In ===
Date	Pos	Player	Transferred from	Fee	Ref
11 May 2022	LM	(Republic of Ireland) Jordan Shipley	(England) Coventry City	Undisclosed	
27 June 2022	CM	(England) Tom Bayliss	(England) Preston North End	Free transfer	
30 June 2022	LW	(Republic of Ireland) Aiden O'Brien	(England) Portsmouth	Free transfer	
1 July 2022 (Note: The transfer was announced on 28 June, and would become official on July 1, once his Sheffield Wednesday contract expired)	CB	(Jamaica) Chey Dunkley	(England) Sheffield Wednesday	Free transfer	

=== Out ===
Date	Pos	Player	Transferred to	Fee	Ref
30 June 2022	RW	(Northern Ireland) Josh Daniels	(Wales) The New Saints	Released	
30 June 2022	CM	(England) David Davis	(England) Forest Green Rovers	Released	
30 June 2022	CB	(England) Ethan Ebanks-Landell	(England) Rochdale	Released	
30 June 2022	GK	(England) Cameron Gregory	(England) Kettering Town	Released	
30 June 2022	CB	(Grenada) Aaron Pierre	(England) Sutton United	Released	
30 June 2022 (Note: The transfer was announced on 8 June, and would become official once his contract at the club expired)	CM	(England) Josh Vela	(England) Fleetwood Town	Free Transfer	
30 June 2022	RW	(England) Shaun Whalley	(England) Accrington Stanley	Released	
22 July 2022	CB	(England) Ben Crompton	(England) Sunderland	Free Transfer	
22 July 2022	CB	(England) Callum Wilson	(England) Sunderland	Free Transfer	
30 August 2022	CB	(England) Ben Kaninda	(England) Wycombe Wanderers	Free Transfer	

=== Loans in ===
Date	Pos	Player	Loaned from	On loan until	Ref
27 June 2022	RB	(France) Julien Dacosta	(England) Coventry City	31 January 2023 (Note: On 31 January, Dacosta was recalled to Coventry)	
4 July 2022	CB	(England) Taylor Moore	(England) Bristol City	End of Season	
1 September 2022	CF	(England) Christian Saydee	(England) Bournemouth	End of Season	
1 September 2022	CF	(England) Rob Street	(England) Crystal Palace	End of Season	
1 September 2022	RB	(Northern Ireland) Carl Winchester	(England) Sunderland	End of Season	
1 January 2023 (Note: The loan was announced on 29 December, and would become official on January 1, once the transfer window re-opens.)	RW	(Republic of Ireland) Killian Phillips	(England) Crystal Palace	End of Season	

=== Loans out ===
Date	Pos	Player	Loaned from	On loan until	Ref.
28 October 2022	CB	(England) Kade Craig	(England) AFC Telford United	28 November 2022	
18 November 2022	AM	(Wales) Charlie Caton	(England) Chester	End of Season (Note: On 19 December, Caton's loan at Chester was extended by a further month, On 24 January, the loan was extended further until the end of season)	
31 January 2023	LW	(Republic of Ireland) Aiden O'Brien	(England) Gillingham	End of Season	
17 February 2023	GK	(England) Jaden Bevan	(England) Glossop North End	17 March 2023	

== Pre-season and friendlies ==
On May 27, Shrewsbury Town announced a week training camp in Spain between 2–7 July, before returning to face AFC Telford United on 12 July. Three days later a home friendly against Cardiff City was confirmed. On 24 June, a further two additions to the pre-season schedule was confirmed, against Qatar SC and Burnley.

Win Draw Loss Fixtures

6 July 2022 Friendly	Qatar SC	Cancelled	Shrewsbury Town	Benidorm, Spain
19:00 CEST				Stadium: Hotel Meliá Villiatana
Note: Match was cancelled.

12 July 2022 Friendly	AFC Telford United	0–0	Shrewsbury Town	Wellington
19:45 BST		Report		Stadium: New Bucks Head

15 July 2022 Friendly	Shrewsbury Town	1–3	Burnley	Shrewsbury
19:00 BST	Shipley 46'	Report	Bastien 27'; Tucker 59'; Thomas 84'	Stadium: Montgomery Waters Meadow

19 July 2022 Friendly	Shrewsbury Town	0–0	Cardiff City	Shrewsbury
19:00 BST		Report		Stadium: Montgomery Waters Meadow

== Competitions ==
=== Overall record ===
Competition	First match	Last match	Starting round	Record							
Competition	First match	Last match	Starting round	Pld	W	D	L	GF	GA	GD	Win %
League One	30 July 2022	06 May 2023	Matchday 1	34	15	7	12	43	36	+7	44.12
FA Cup	5 November 2022	07 January 2023	Third round	3	2	0	1	6	4	+2	66.67
EFL Cup	9 August 2022	23 August 2022	First round	2	1	0	1	3	3	+0	50.00
EFL Trophy	30 August 2022	18 October 2022	Group stage	3	0	0	3	1	7	−6	0.00
Total				42	18	7	17	53	50	+3	42.86

Last updated: 28/01/2023
Source: [ Soccerway]

=== League One ===
==== League table ====
Pos	Team	Pld	W	D	L	GF	GA	GD	Pts
9	Wycombe Wanderers	46	20	9	17	59	51	+8	69
10	Charlton Athletic	46	16	14	16	70	66	+4	62
11	Lincoln City	46	14	20	12	47	47	0	62
12	Shrewsbury Town	46	17	8	21	52	61	−9	59
13	Fleetwood Town	46	14	16	16	53	51	+2	58
14	Exeter City	46	15	11	20	64	68	−4	56
15	Burton Albion	46	15	11	20	57	79	−22	56

Source: EFL Official Website
Rules for classification: 1) Points; 2) Goal difference; 3) Number of goals scored; 4) Head-to-head results; 5) Wins; 6) Away goals; 7) Penalty points (sec 9.5); 8) 12-point sending off offences

==== Results summary ====
Overall								Home						Away					
Pld	W	D	L	GF	GA	GD	Pts	W	D	L	GF	GA	GD	W	D	L	GF	GA	GD
46	17	8	21	52	61	−9	59	11	3	9	32	32	0	6	5	12	20	29	−9

Last updated: complete.
Source: [ Soccerway]

==== Results by round ====
Round	1	2	3	4	5	6	7	8	9	10	11	12	13	14	15	16	17	18	19	20	21	22	23	24	25	26	27	28	29	30	31	32	33	34	35	36	37	38	39	40	41	42	43	44	45	46
Ground	A	H	A	H	H	A	A	H	A	H	A	H	A	H	A	A	H	H	A	H	H	A	H	H	A	H	A	H	A	H	A	A	H	A	A	H	A	A	H	A	H	H	A	H	H	A
Result	D	L	W	D	L	D	W	W	L	W	L	W	W	L	L	D	D	L	L	W	W	L	L	L	W	W	W	W	W	W	D	L	W	D	L	W	L	L	L	L	D	L	L	L	W	L
Position	17	20	15	16	18	20	13	8	12	9	12	9	8	10	12	14	10	14	16	12	10	12	14	16	14	11	9	9	9	8	8	8	8	8	9	8	10	10	10	11	10	12	13	13	12	12

Source: [ Soccerway]
A = Away; H = Home; W = Win; D = Draw; L = Loss; P = Postponed

==== Matches ====
Win Draw Loss Fixtures

On 23 June, the league fixtures were announced.

30 July 2022 1	Morecambe	0–0	Shrewsbury Town	Morecambe
15:00 BST	Love (yellow card) 77'; Delaney (yellow card) 82'	Report	Bowman (yellow card) 63'; Flanagan (yellow card) 80'	Stadium: Mazuma Stadium; Attendance: 4,725; Referee: Marc Edwards

6 August 2022 2	Shrewsbury Town	0–1	Accrington Stanley	Shrewsbury
15:00 BST	Flanagan (yellow card) 57' (yellow-red card) 57'	Report	Coyle (yellow card) 45+6'; Whalley (yellow card) 68'; Leigh 77'	Stadium: Montgomery Waters Meadow; Attendance: 6,117; Referee: Andy Haines

13 August 2022 3	Wycombe Wanderers	1–2	Shrewsbury Town	High Wycombe
15:00 BST	Horgan (yellow card) 28'; Forino-Joseph (yellow card) 48'; McCleary 51'; Mehmeti (yellow card) 82'	Report	Pennington 60'; Leahy 89' (pen.)	Stadium: Adams Park; Attendance: 4,489; Referee: Lee Swabey

16 August 2022 4	Shrewsbury Town	0–0	Derby County	Shrewsbury
19:45 BST	Bayliss (yellow card) 75'; Flanagan (yellow card) 77'; Nurse (yellow card) 89'	Report	Knight (yellow card) 90+2'	Stadium: Montgomery Waters Meadow; Attendance: 7,867; Referee: Scott Oldham

20 August 2022 5	Shrewsbury Town	0–3	Ipswich Town	Shrewsbury
15:00 BST	Bayliss (yellow card) 51'	Report	Morsy (yellow card) 16'; John-Jules 22'; Chaplin 52'; Jackson 90+2'	Stadium: Montgomery Waters Meadow; Attendance: 6,556; Referee: Will Finnie

27 August 2022 6	Bristol Rovers	1–1	Shrewsbury Town	Horfield
15:00 BST	Marquis (yellow card) 57'; Loft 68'	Report	Bowman (yellow card) 65', (goal) 79'	Stadium: Memorial Stadium; Attendance: 8,570; Referee: Sam Purkiss

3 September 2022 7	Forest Green Rovers	0–2	Shrewsbury Town	Nailsworth
15:00 BST	O'Keeffe (yellow card) 44'; Stevenson (yellow card) 45+9'; McGee (yellow card) 72'	Report	Pyke 10'; Shipley 48'; Bayliss (yellow card) 72'; Moore (yellow card) 83'	Stadium: The innocent New Lawn Stadium; Attendance: 2,468; Referee: Peter Wright

10 September 2022	Shrewsbury Town	Postponed	Oxford United	Shrewsbury
15:00 BST				Stadium: Montgomery Waters Meadow
Note: Fixture was postponed as a mark of respect following the passing of Queen Elizabeth II.

13 September 2022 8	Shrewsbury Town	3–2	Exeter City	Shrewsbury
19:45 BST	Pennington 21'; Bayliss 34'; Dunkley 90+3'	Report	Sweeney 17'; Grounds 20', (yellow card) 39'	Stadium: Montgomery Waters Meadow; Attendance: 4,803; Referee: Martin Woods

17 September 2022 9	Port Vale	2–1	Shrewsbury Town	Burslem
15:00 BST	Harrison 9', 90+1'; Butterworth (yellow card) 47'; Jones (yellow card) 87'	Report	Saydee 19'; Flanagan (yellow card) 50'; Street (yellow card) 88'; Shipley (yellow card) 90+2'	Stadium: Vale Park; Attendance: 7,403; Referee: Ben Speedie

24 September 2022 10	Shrewsbury Town	2–1	Burton Albion	Shrewsbury
15:00 BST	Saydee 13'; Bowman 66'; Dunkley (yellow card) 90+11'	Report	Adeboyejo 57'; Borthwick-Jackson (yellow card) 71'	Stadium: Montgomery Waters Meadow; Attendance: 5,667; Referee: Thomas Kirk

1 October 2022 11	Cheltenham Town	2–0	Shrewsbury Town	Cheltenham
15:00 BST	Sercombe (yellow card) 24'; Long 45'; May 46'	Report	Flanagan (yellow card) 18'	Stadium: Whaddon Road Ground; Attendance: 3,842; Referee: Carl Brook

8 October 2022 12	Shrewsbury Town	2–1	Milton Keynes Dons	Shrewsbury
15:00 BST	Bayliss 24'; Shipley 45+2'; Street (yellow card) 90+6'	Report	Jules 54'; Devoy (red card) 59'; Dennis (yellow card) 64'; McEachran (yellow card) 70'	Stadium: Montgomery Waters Meadow; Attendance: 5,875; Referee: Andy Woolmer

15 October 2022 13	Fleetwood Town	0–1	Shrewsbury Town	Fleetwood
15:00 BST	Lane (yellow card) 29'; Rooney (yellow card) 52'; Vela (yellow card) 87'; Sarpong-Wiredu (yellow card) 90+1'	Report	Saydee (yellow card) 28'; Bayliss 30' (yellow card) 88'; Maroši (yellow card) 36'; Street (yellow card) 90'; Leahy (yellow card) 90+4'	Stadium: Highbury Stadium; Attendance: 3,091; Referee: Thomas Parsons

22 October 2022 14	Shrewsbury Town	0–1	Charlton Athletic	Shrewsbury
15:00 BST	Saydee (yellow card) 63'	Report	Inniss (yellow card) 11'; Rak-Sakyi 69'; Fraser (yellow card) 86'; O'Connell (yellow card) 90+2'	Stadium: Montgomery Waters Meadow; Attendance: 6,519; Referee: Seb Stockbridge

25 October 2022 15	Plymouth Argyle	2–1	Shrewsbury Town	Plymouth
19:45 BST	Cosgrove (yellow card) 68'; Ennis 70'; Whittaker 83'	Report	Shipley 30'; Leahy (yellow card) 87'	Stadium: Home Park; Attendance: 15,322; Referee: Andy Woolmer

29 October 2022 16	Portsmouth	1–1	Shrewsbury Town	Milton
15:00 BST	Mingi (yellow card) 8'; Swanson 29'	Report	Bennett 25'	Stadium: Fratton Park; Attendance: 17,792; Referee: Tom Reeves

9 November 2022 17	Shrewsbury Town	1–1	Oxford United	Shrewsbury
19:45 GMT	Moore (yellow card) 11'; Flanagan (yellow card) 33'; Bennett (yellow card) 45+6'; Pennington 65'	Report	Brannagan 15' (yellow card) 22'; Moore (yellow card) 88'	Stadium: Montgomery Waters Meadow; Attendance: 5,158; Referee: Darren Drysdale

12 November 2022 18	Shrewsbury Town	0–1	Barnsley	Shrewsbury
15:00 GMT	Pyke (yellow card) 27'; Flanagan (yellow card) 67'; Shipley (yellow card) 70'; Dunkley (yellow card) 90+6'; Leahy (yellow card) 90+6'	Report	Phillips 10'; Tedić (yellow card) 67'; Collins (yellow card) 90+7'	Stadium: Montgomery Waters Meadow; Attendance: 6,285; Referee: Christopher Pollard

19 November 2022 19	Sheffield Wednesday	1–0	Shrewsbury Town	Owlerton, Sheffield
15:00 BST	McGuinness 39'; Wilks (yellow card) 90+4'	Report	Pyke (yellow card) 82'	Stadium: Hillsborough; Attendance: 24,271; Referee: Andy Woolmer

3 December 2022 20	Shrewsbury Town	2–0	Lincoln City	Shrewsbury
15:00 GMT	Dunkley (yellow card) 10'; Leahy 45' (pen.); Bayliss 60', (yellow card) 86'	Report	Vernam (yellow card) 31'; Walsh (yellow card) 43'; O'Connor (yellow card) 81'	Stadium: Montgomery Waters Meadow; Attendance: 5,461; Referee: Bobby Madden

10 December 2022 21	Shrewsbury Town	3–2	Bolton Wanderers	Shrewsbury
12:30 GMT	Street 2', (yellow card) 73'; Saydee (yellow card) 65', (goal) 79'; Maroši (yellow card) 70'; Shipley (yellow card) 73'; Dunkley 90+2'	Report	Charles 13', 71' (pen.); Sheehan (yellow card) 45+1'	Stadium: Montgomery Waters Meadow; Attendance: 7,098; Referee: Craig Hicks

17 December 2022	Peterborough United	Postponed	Shrewsbury Town	Peterborough
15:00 GMT				Stadium: Weston Homes Stadium
Note: Fixture was postponed due to a frozen pitch.

26 December 2022 22	Cambridge United	2–1	Shrewsbury Town	Cambridge
15:00 GMT	Okedina (yellow card) 24'; Tracey 67', (yellow card) 90+5'; Williams (yellow card) 72'; Smith 76'	Report	Pennington (yellow card) 28'; Saydee 64'; Street (yellow card) 72'; Bowman (red card) 90'	Stadium: Abbey Stadium; Attendance: 5,875; Referee: Sam Allison

29 December 2022 23	Shrewsbury Town	0–1	Cheltenham Town	Shrewsbury
19:45 GMT	Shipley (yellow card) 58'; Leahy (red card) 69'	Report	Nlundulu 38', (yellow card) 60'; Raglan (red card) 69'; Norton (yellow card) 87'; Freestone (yellow card) 88'; Bonds (yellow card) 90+6'	Stadium: Montgomery Waters Meadow; Attendance: 6,149; Referee: Sam Purkiss

1 January 2023 24	Shrewsbury Town	0–3	Fleetwood Town	Shrewsbury
15:00 GMT	Pennington (red card) 22'; Leahy (yellow card) 24'	Report	Sarpong-Wiredu (yellow card) 24'; Muskwe 25' (pen.); Omochere 28'; Dunkley 89' (o.g.)	Stadium: Montgomery Waters Meadow; Attendance: 5,685; Referee: Ross Joyce

14 January 2023 26	Burton Albion	0–4	Shrewsbury Town	Burton upon Trent
15:00 GMT		Report	Saydee 1', 43'; Shipley (yellow card) 12'; Leahy 58' (pen.); Flanagan (yellow card) 70'; Pyke (yellow card) 86'; Dunkley 90+4'	Stadium: Pirelli Stadium; Attendance: 3,575; Referee: Seb Stockbridge

21 January 2023 27	Shrewsbury Town	5–1	Cambridge United	Shrewsbury
15:00 GMT	Leahy 33' (pen.), 90+1'; Shipley 45+5'; Pennington 57'; Saydee 71'	Report	Worman (yellow card) 12'; Bennett (yellow card) 19'; Digby (yellow card) 32'; Okedina (yellow card) 45+3'; Ironside 69'	Stadium: Montgomery Waters Meadow; Attendance: 5,841; Referee: Thomas Kirk

24 January 2023 27	Milton Keynes Dons	0–1	Shrewsbury Town	Milton Keynes
19:45 GMT		Report	Bayliss 89'	Stadium: Stadium MK; Attendance: 5,531; Referee: Alan Young

28 January 2023 28	Shrewsbury Town	2–1	Forest Green Rovers	Shrewsbury
15:00 GMT	Pyke 90+4'; Bowman 90+8'	Report	Garrick 18'	Stadium: Montgomery Waters Meadow; Attendance: 6,310; Referee: Andrew Kitchen

4 February 2023 29	Oxford United	0–1	Shrewsbury Town	Littlemore
15:00 GMT	Long (yellow card) 83'; Moore (yellow card) 88'	Report	Phillips (yellow card) 35'; Flanagan (yellow card) 55'; Shipley (yellow card) 66'; Bowman 74'	Stadium: The Kassam Stadium; Attendance: 7,597; Referee: Scott Oldham

11 February 2023 30	Shrewsbury Town	3–2	Port Vale	Shrewsbury
15:00 GMT	Dunkley 27', (yellow card) 62'; Leahy 33'; Phillips 43'; Winchester (yellow card) 48'; Saydee (yellow card) 54'	Report	Politic 12', (yellow card) 57'; Proctor 52'; Conlon (yellow card) 58'; Massey (yellow card) 90+4'; Garrity (yellow card) 90+7'	Stadium: Montgomery Waters Meadow; Attendance: 8,502; Referee: Thomas Parsons

14 February 2023 31	Exeter City	0–0	Shrewsbury Town	Exeter
19:45 GMT		Report	Bennett (yellow card) 90+2'	Stadium: St James Park; Attendance: 5,661 (204 away); Referee: Ben Speedie

18 February 2023 32	Accrington Stanley	1–0	Shrewsbury Town	Accrington
15:00 GMT	Pressley 12'; Longelo (yellow card) 67'; Sangare (yellow card) 77'; Fernandes (yellow card) 90+8'	Report	Winchester (yellow card) 16'; Saydee (yellow card) 50'; Phillips (yellow card) 90+8'	Stadium: Wham Stadium; Attendance: 2,858 (807 away); Referee: Anthony Backhouse

25 February 2023 33	Shrewsbury Town	2–0	Wycombe Wanderers	Shrewsbury
15:00 GMT	Willis 31' (o.g.); Bowman (yellow card) 69'; Leahy (yellow card) 73'; Bayliss (yellow card) 83'; Pyke 86'; Moore (yellow card) 90+2'	Report		Stadium: Montgomery Waters Meadow; Attendance: 6,918 (601 away); Referee: Carl Brook

5 March 2023 34	Derby County	2–2	Shrewsbury Town	Derby
15:00 GMT	McGoldrick (yellow card) 19', (goal) 45+1'; Roberts 20'; Forsyth (yellow card) 48'; Cashin (yellow card) 54'	Report	Leahy (yellow card) 15', (goal) 72' (pen.); Moore (yellow card) 38'; Bayliss 49'	Stadium: Pride Park Stadium; Attendance: 27,761 (2,251 Shrewsbury Town supporters); Referee: Simon Mather

7 March 2023 35	Peterborough United	2–1	Shrewsbury Town	Peterborough
19:45 GMT	Clarke-Harris 17'; Kyprianou (yellow card) 67'; Kent 87'; Norburn (yellow card) 90+1'; Norris (yellow card) 90+2'	Report	Flanagan 21', (yellow card) 62'; Pyke (yellow card) 38'; Saydee (yellow card) 78'	Stadium: Weston Homes Stadium; Attendance: 7,388 (313 away); Referee: Declan Bourne

11 March 2023 36	Shrewsbury Town	3–1	Morecambe	Shrewsbury
15:00 GMT	Moore (yellow card) 21'; Leahy 33' (pen.), (yellow card) 65'; Street 44'; Bayliss (yellow card) 62'; Dunkley 84'	Report	Crowley 45+1'	Stadium: Montgomery Waters Meadow; Attendance: 6,918 (185 away); Referee: Rebecca Welch

18 March 2023 37	Ipswich Town	2–0	Shrewsbury Town	Ipswich
15:00 GMT	Hirst 15'; Luongo 51'; Broadhead (yellow card) 68'; Davis (yellow card) 90+3'	Report	Shipley (yellow card) 21'; Pyke (yellow card) 43'; Pennington (yellow card) 56'; Saydee (yellow card) 83'; Moore (yellow card) 89'	Stadium: Portman Road; Attendance: 26,432 (343 away); Referee: Ollie Yates

25 March 2023	Shrewsbury Town	Postponed	Bristol Rovers	Shrewsbury
15:00 GMT				Stadium: Montgomery Waters Meadow
Note: Fixture was postponed due to international call-ups within the Bristol Rovers squad.

1 April 2023 38	Charlton Athletic	6–0	Shrewsbury Town	Charlton
15:00 BST	Fraser 27'; Sessegnon (yellow card) 31'; Dobson (yellow card) 36'; Morgan 38'; Rak-Sakyi 45+2'; Leaburn 61', 70' (pen.); Bonne 90+2'	Report	Flanagan (yellow card) 26' (yellow-red card) 69'; Saydee (yellow card) 39'; Shipley (yellow card) 69'; Winchester (yellow card) 88'	Stadium: The Valley; Attendance: 13,241 (646 away); Referee: Bobby Madley

7 April 2023 39	Shrewsbury Town	0–3	Peterborough United	Shrewsbury
15:00 BST	Phillips (yellow card) 66'; Street (yellow card) 71'	Report	Clarke-Harris 30' (pen.); Mason-Clark 51'; Norris (yellow card) 61'; Taylor 83'	Stadium: Montgomery Waters Meadow; Attendance: 6,930 (801 away); Referee: Carl Boyson

10 April 2023 40	Barnsley	2–1	Shrewsbury Town	Barnsley
15:00 BST	Andersen (yellow card) 29'; Cadden 40', (red card) 73'; Cole 45+2'; Connell (yellow card) 47'	Report	Bowman (yellow card) 31' (yellow-red card) 90+9'; Pennington (yellow card) 76'; Moore (yellow card) 78'; Phillips 90+1', (yellow card) 90+8'; Shipley (yellow card) 90+7'; Bloxham (yellow card) 90+8'; Steve Cotterill (yellow card) off pitch'	Stadium: Oakwell Stadium; Attendance: 13,026 (514 away); Referee: Geoff Eltringham

15 April 2023 41	Shrewsbury Town	1–1	Portsmouth	Shrewsbury
15:00 BST	Street 52', (yellow card) 56'; Bennett (yellow card) 61'; Maroši (yellow card) 72'; Flanagan (yellow card) 83' (yellow-red card) 86'	Report	Pack (yellow card) 12', (goal) 82'; Robertson (yellow card) 56'; Raggett (yellow card) 90+5'	Stadium: Montgomery Waters Meadow; Attendance: 7,020 (1,129 away); Referee: Tom Nield

18 April 2023 42	Shrewsbury Town	1–2	Plymouth Argyle	Shrewsbury
19:45 BST	Shipley (yellow card) 46'; Phillips 53'	Report	Cosgrove (yellow card) 17'; Edwards 68'; Matete (yellow card) 80'; Wright 90+6'; Ennis (yellow card) 90+7'	Stadium: Montgomery Waters Meadow; Attendance: 5,801 (1,124 away); Referee: Anthony Backhouse

22 April 2023 43	Bolton Wanderers	1–0	Shrewsbury Town	Horwich
15:00 BST	Sheehan 63'; Williams (yellow card) 90+2'	Report	Winchester (yellow card) 58'; Bowman (yellow card) 90+2'	Stadium: University of Bolton Stadium; Attendance: 18,596 (740 away); Referee: Tom Reeves

29 April 2023 44	Shrewsbury Town	0–3	Sheffield Wednesday	Shrewsbury
15:00 BST	Bennett (yellow card) 56'; Flanagan (yellow card) 81'; Dunkley (yellow card) 86'	Report	Smith 8', 48', 81'; Palmer (yellow card) 73'; Johnson (yellow card) 74'	Stadium: Montgomery Waters Meadow; Attendance: 8,467 (1,642 away); Referee: Dean Whitestone

2 May 2023 45	Shrewsbury Town	2–1	Bristol Rovers	Shrewsbury
19:45 BST	Leahy 3'; Dunkley (yellow card) 23'; Shipley (yellow card) 36'; Street 53'; Winchester (yellow card) 61'; Phillips (yellow card) 65'	Report	Hoole (yellow card) 59'; Coburn 70'; Collins (yellow card) 82'	Stadium: Montgomery Waters Meadow; Attendance: 5,949 (748 away); Referee: Lee Swabey

7 May 2023 46	Lincoln City	1–0	Shrewsbury Town	Lincoln
12:30 BST	O'Connor (yellow card) 26'; Virtue 73'; Erhahon (yellow card) 90+1'	Report	Dunkley (red card) 89'; Flanagan (yellow card) 90+1'	Stadium: LNER Stadium; Attendance: 9,124 (617 away); Referee: Andy Haines

=== FA Cup ===
Shrewsbury were drawn at home to York City in the first round the winners off Peterborough United versus Salford City in the second round and to Sunderland in the third round.

Win Draw Loss Fixtures

5 November 2022 First round	Shrewsbury Town	2–1	York City	Shrewsbury
15:00 BST	Shipley 2'; Leahy 45+3' (pen.)	Report	Duku 45+5'	Stadium: Montgomery Waters Meadow; Attendance: 3,807; Referee: Scott Tallis

26 November 2022 Second round	Shrewsbury Town	3–1	Peterborough United	Shrewsbury
15:00 GMT	Bayliss 2'; Street (yellow card) 27'; Saydee (yellow card) 30'; Pennington 35'; Leahy 45+7' (pen.); Shipley (yellow card) 88'; Moore (yellow card) 90+2'	Report	Poku 13'; Fuchs (yellow card) 34'; Butler (yellow card) 64'; Kent (yellow card) 79'; Thompson (yellow card) 82'	Stadium: Montgomery Wates Meadow; Attendance: 2,895; Referee: Simon Mather

7 January 2023 Third round	Shrewsbury Town	1–2	Sunderland	Shrewsbury
15:00 GMT	Pennington 81'; Shipley (yellow card) 90'	Report	Roberts (yellow card) 20'; Stewart 90+2'; O'Nien 90+4'	Stadium: Montgomery Waters Meadow; Attendance: 6,309; Referee: Scott Oldham

=== EFL Cup ===
Win Draw Loss Fixtures

The Shrews were drawn at home to Carlisle United in the first round and to Burnley in the second round.

9 August 2022 First round	Shrewsbury Town	3–2	Carlisle United	Shrewsbury
19:30 BST	Leahy 45+1'; Udoh 75'; Dunkley 86'; Shipley (yellow card) 90+5'	Report	Edmondson 13'; Dennis 81'	Stadium: Montgomery Waters Meadow; Attendance: 2,269; Referee: Christopher Pollard

23 August 2022 Second round	Shrewsbury Town	0–1	Burnley	Shrewsbury
19:45 BST	Dacosta (yellow card) 57'; Flanagan (yellow card) 69'	Report	Bastien 50'	Stadium: Montgomery Waters Meadow; Attendance: 3,819; Referee: Bobby Madden

=== EFL Trophy ===
On 20 June, the initial Group stage draw was made, grouping Shrewsbury Town with Port Vale and Stockport County. Three days later, Wolverhampton Wanderers U21s joined Northern Group C.

Pos	Div	Team	Pld	W	PW	PL	L	GF	GA	GD	Pts	Qualification
1	L1	Port Vale	3	3	0	0	0	7	0	+7	9	Advance to Round 2
2	ACA	Wolverhampton Wanderers U21	3	2	0	0	1	4	4	0	6	Advance to Round 2
3	L2	Stockport County	3	1	0	0	2	2	3	−1	3	
4	L1	Shrewsbury Town	3	0	0	0	3	1	7	−6	0	

Source: EFL.com

Win Draw Loss Fixtures

30 August 2022 Group stage	Shrewsbury Town	1–2	Wolverhampton Wanderers U21s	Shrewsbury
19:00 BST	Caton (yellow card) 70'; Etienne (yellow card) 72'; Hearnes 76'	Report	Hubner (yellow card) 66'; Hodge 79', 90+3'; Roberts (yellow card) 83'	Stadium: Montgomery Waters Meadow; Attendance: 1,413; Referee: Ollie Yates

20 September 2022 Group stage	Shrewsbury Town	0–4	Port Vale	Shrewsbury
19:00 BST	Bowman (yellow card) 26'; Nurse (yellow card) 54'; Hutchings (yellow card) 61'	Report	Politic 15', 56', 57'; McDermott (yellow card) 38'; Robinson (yellow card) 65'; Walker 74'	Stadium: Montgomery Waters Meadow; Attendance: 1,635; Referee: Ben Toner

18 October 2022 Group stage	Stockport County	1–0	Shrewsbury Town	Edgeley
19:30 BST	Johnson 2' (yellow card) 56'; Macdonald (yellow card) 48'	Report		Stadium: Edgeley Park; Attendance: 1,054; Referee: Lewis Smith
