= Ian Lawlor =

Irish footballer

Personal information
- Full name: Ian John Lawlor
- Date of birth: 27 October 1994 (age 32)
- Place of birth: Dublin, Ireland
- Height: 1.93 m (6 ft 4 in)
- Position: Goalkeeper

Team information
- Current team: Crewe Alexandra
- Number: 13

Youth career
- St. Malachy's
- –2010: Home Farm
- 2010–2015: Manchester City

Senior career*
| Years | Team | Apps | (Gls) |
| 2015–2017 | Manchester City | 0 | (0) |
| 2015–2016 | → Barnet (loan) | 5 | (0) |
| 2016 | → Bury (loan) | 12 | (0) |
| 2017–2021 | Doncaster Rovers | 70 | (0) |
| 2020 | → Scunthorpe United (loan) | 4 | (0) |
| 2020–2021 | → Oldham Athletic (loan) | 30 | (0) |
| 2021–2023 | Dundee | 13 | (0) |
| 2023–2026 | Doncaster Rovers | 13 | (0) |
| 2026– | Crewe Alexandra | 22 | (0) |

International career
| 2012–2013 | Republic of Ireland U19 | 6 | (0) |
| 2014–2016 | Republic of Ireland U21 | 5 | (0) |
- * Club domestic league appearances and goals as of 17:40, 1 June 2026 (UTC)

Ian John Lawlor (born 27 October 1994) is an Irish professional footballer who plays as a goalkeeper for EFL League Two club Crewe Alexandra.

Lawlor was born in Dublin and played youth football with Home Farm and Manchester City before starting his professional career with an emergency loan to Barnet. After spending time on loan at Bury, Lawlor moved to Doncaster Rovers. He joined Oldham Athletic on a season-long loan in 2020. Lawlor then joined Dundee for two seasons, winning the Scottish Championship with them, before another spell at Doncaster.

Lawlor has played for the Republic of Ireland at youth level and received call-ups to the first team.

== Early life ==
Lawlor's father, John, was a goalkeeper at a junior level and inspired his son, helping him with training beyond that which was scheduled for him. As part of this training, Lawlor would often watch videos of Oliver Kahn.

His first youth club was St. Malachy's in Edenmore, from which he moved to the more high-profile Home Farm academy. Here he was spotted by Manchester City scout Mick Collins.

Lawlor went to school at Chanel College in Dublin, playing football for his school team.

== Club career ==
=== Manchester City ===
==== Development side ====
In Lawlor's first season he suffered a dislocated shoulder, ruling him out for most of the season. Lawlor was a regular for Manchester City's development side, initially taking the number one spot following Eirik Johansen's loan to Scunthorpe United. He went on the club's first team tour of Austria in the pre-season of 2012–13 and continued his battle for the under-21 goalkeeping spot against Johansen and Angus Gunn. In the 2013–14 season, Lawlor was involved with the first team on the nights of some Champions League matches. He also played both legs as the development side lost the Under-21 Premier League Cup final to Reading. Lawlor was included in the squad for a 2014–15 pre-season friendly against Sporting Kansas City.

==== 2015–16 season ====
Lawlor received his first experience of playing senior football following an emergency loan move Barnet on 13 December 2015, necessitated by injuries to Graham Stack and Jamie Stephens. He went straight into goal for a match against Yeovil Town. Lawlor made a total of five appearances, keeping one clean sheet.

His displays at Barnet and youth level then earned him a loan move to Bury for the rest of the season on 7 January 2016, a side who had monitored him for some time. He made his debut two days later in an FA Cup match against Bradford City, in which he kept a clean sheet. He made his league debut for the club on 16 January 2016 in a 3–2 loss to Walsall. In the FA Cup replay against Bradford City, Lawlor saved two penalties as a 10-man Bury emerged victorious from the shootout. In the next round Lawlor conceded a Chuba Akpom hat-trick as Bury went out of the cup to Hull City in the fourth round. Lawlor went on to make 12 league appearances, keeping five clean-sheets, and three FA Cup appearances for the Shakers.

==== 2016–17 season ====
Lawlor joined the Manchester City first team again in pre-season for a match against Bayern Munich, alongside Willy Caballero and fellow youth teamers Angus Gunn and Billy O'Brien. Lawlor was assigned the number 45 for the upcoming season. Going into the January transfer window Lawlor was linked with a move to League One with Bury and Chesterfield or League Two with Doncaster Rovers and Portsmouth.

=== Doncaster Rovers ===
==== 2016–17 season ====
Lawlor was signed by League Two leaders Doncaster Rovers on 13 January 2017 to compete with first team goalkeepers Marko Maroši and Ross Etheridge. He made his debut for the club a day later against former loan club Barnet, conceding once in a 3–1 away win to solidify Rovers position at the top of the table. Lawlor made his home debut a week later, again conceding once in a 3–1 win over Crewe Alexandra, a match in which he made a string of high-quality first half saves. A week later Lawlor kept his first clean sheet for Doncaster in a 3–0 away win against Yeovil Town.

Lawlor suffered a minor groin injury against Leyton Orient on 18 March 2017 which resulted in him being substituted at half time. However, he was passed fit for the next match against top of the table rivals Plymouth Argyle. Promotion was confirmed as Lawlor kept a clean sheet against Mansfield Town on 8 April. He missed 2 matches in mid-April due to a chest injury but reclaimed the starting spot on his return.

Due to Marko Maroši's injury issues and Ross Etheridge's poor form, and subsequent loan spell with Lincoln City, Lawlor established himself as first choice goalkeeper for the remainder of the season, starting a total of 19 league matches from a possible 21 and keeping clean sheets in 5 of those matches. The season ended with promotion, although a poor run of form towards the end of the season saw the club finish third.

==== 2017–18 season ====
Lawlor started his first full season with Doncaster Rovers as the first choice goalkeeper, keeping a clean sheet in the season opener against Gillingham. He played his first cup match for the club in an EFL Cup tie against Bradford City on 8 August 2017.

=== Dundee ===
On 19 July 2021, Lawlor signed a two-year deal with Scottish Premiership side Dundee. Lawlor made a debut of sorts for the team in the Scottish Challenge Cup, playing for Dundee B as the one designated 'overage' player in the side. Lawlor then made his debut for Dundee in a Scottish Cup victory over Dumbarton, and made his league debut in February 2022, in an away victory against Heart of Midlothian.

Lawlor kept a clean sheet in his first game of the 2022–23 season, in a league game against Greenock Morton. He remained Dundee's starting keeper until suffering a concussion during Dundee's Scottish Cup win over Airdrieonians. Lawlor won the Scottish Championship with Dundee at the end of the season.

=== Doncaster Rovers (2nd spell) ===
On 22 May 2023 following the end of his contract with Dundee, Lawlor returned to Doncaster Rovers on a two-year deal. He made his debut on 5 August in the league against Harrogate Town.

Despite not playing a league game for Rovers in the 2024–25 season, Lawlor lifted the EFL League Two title with the club at the end of the season. On 20 May 2025, Lawlor agreed a new one-year deal with the newly promoted side.

On 12 August 2025, Lawlor kept a clean sheet on his first appearance of the season, helping Rovers to an impressive 4–0 win away to Championship side Middlesbrough in the first round of the EFL Cup.

=== Crewe Alexandra ===
On 10 January 2026, Crewe Alexandra announced the signing of Lawlor ahead of their EFL League Two clash with Harrogate Town and he joined the first team lineup later that day. Lawlor was sidelined at the start of the 2026–2027 season by a hernia problem that required an operation.

== International career ==
Despite being a regular squad player for the Republic of Ireland's youth teams, it was not until he reached under-19 level that he established himself. He made a total of six appearances as an under-19 and made his under-21 debut against Qatar.

In May 2014, he was called up to the senior squad due to Rob Elliot's unavailability, appearing on the bench for friendlies against Italy, Costa Rica and Portugal. In October 2016, Lawlor was called into the senior squad again for World Cup qualifying following an injury to Keiren Westwood.

In May 2018, Lawlor was one of six goalkeepers called up to a provisional squad for matches against Celtic, France and United States.

== Style of play ==
According to Doncaster Rovers former manager Darren Ferguson, Lawlor is "quick, he's agile for a big lad....He plays at a good tempo and if he has to kick, he kicks a hell of a way. He's got good accuracy....He's got a lot of potential, he's a good size, good with his feet."

== Personal life ==
Lawlor struck up a good relationship with fellow Irish goalkeeper Shay Given during their time together at Manchester City, often receiving advice from him. He has also developed a good working relationship with Joe Hart.

== Career statistics ==
=== Club ===
As of match played 2 May 2026

Appearances and goals by club, season and competition
| Club | Season | League | | | National Cup | | League Cup | | Continental | | Other | | Total | |
| Club | Season | Division | Apps | Goals | Apps | Goals | Apps | Goals | Apps | Goals | Apps | Goals | Apps | Goals |
|---|---|---|---|---|---|---|---|---|---|---|---|---|---|---|
| Manchester City | 2015–16 | Premier League | 0 | 0 | – | | 0 | 0 | 0 | 0 | – | | 0 | 0 |
| Manchester City | 2016–17 | Premier League | 0 | 0 | 0 | 0 | 0 | 0 | 0 | 0 | – | | 0 | 0 |
| Manchester City | Total | | 0 | 0 | 0 | 0 | 0 | 0 | 0 | 0 | – | | 0 | 0 |
| Barnet (loan) | 2015–16 | League Two | 5 | 0 | – | | – | | – | | – | | 5 | 0 |
| Bury (loan) | 2015–16 | League One | 12 | 0 | 3 | 0 | – | | – | | – | | 15 | 0 |
| Doncaster Rovers | 2016–17 | League Two | 19 | 0 | – | | – | | – | | – | | 19 | 0 |
| Doncaster Rovers | 2017–18 | League One | 34 | 0 | 3 | 0 | 2 | 0 | – | | 0 | 0 | 39 | 0 |
| Doncaster Rovers | 2018–19 | League One | 10 | 0 | 4 | 0 | 1 | 0 | – | | 2 (Note: Appearance(s) in the Football League Trophy) | 0 | 17 | 0 |
| Doncaster Rovers | 2019–20 | League One | 7 | 0 | 0 | 0 | 0 | 0 | – | | 3 | 0 | 10 | 0 |
| Doncaster Rovers | 2020–21 | League One | 0 | 0 | 0 | 0 | 0 | 0 | – | | 0 | 0 | 0 | 0 |
| Doncaster Rovers | Total | | 70 | 0 | 7 | 0 | 3 | 0 | – | | 5 | 0 | 85 | 0 |
| Scunthorpe United (loan) | 2019–20 | League Two | 4 | 0 | 0 | 0 | 0 | 0 | – | | 0 | 0 | 4 | 0 |
| Oldham Athletic (loan) | 2020–21 | League Two | 30 | 0 | 3 | 0 | 2 | 0 | – | | 4 | 0 | 39 | 0 |
| Dundee | 2021–22 | Scottish Premiership | 8 | 0 | 2 | 0 | 0 | 0 | – | | 0 | 0 | 10 | 0 |
| Dundee | 2022–23 | Scottish Championship | 5 | 0 | 1 | 0 | 0 | 0 | – | | 0 | 0 | 6 | 0 |
| Dundee | Total | | 13 | 0 | 3 | 0 | 0 | 0 | 0 | 0 | 0 | 0 | 16 | 0 |
| Dundee B (Note: Appearances in the Scottish Challenge Cup, in which teams from the SPFL Development League compete against senior clubs) | 2021–22 | – | | | – | | – | | – | | 1 | 0 | 1 | 0 |
| Doncaster Rovers | 2023–24 | League Two | 10 | 0 | 0 | 0 | 2 | 0 | – | | 2 | 0 | 14 | 0 |
| Doncaster Rovers | 2024–25 | League Two | 0 | 0 | 0 | 0 | 1 | 0 | – | | 4 | 0 | 5 | 0 |
| Doncaster Rovers | 2025–26 | League One | 6 | 0 | 0 | 0 | 3 | 0 | – | | 2 | 0 | 11 | 0 |
| Doncaster Rovers | Total | | 16 | 0 | 0 | 0 | 6 | 0 | 0 | 0 | 8 | 0 | 30 | 0 |
| Crewe Alexandra | 2025–26 | League Two | 22 | 0 | 0 | 0 | 0 | 0 | – | | 0 | 0 | 22 | 0 |
| Career total | | | 172 | 0 | 16 | 0 | 11 | 0 | 0 | 0 | 18 | 0 | 217 | 0 |

== Honours ==
Dundee

- Scottish Championship: 2022–23

Doncaster Rovers

- EFL League Two: 2024–25
