= Will Longbottom =

English footballer

Personal information
- Full name: William Radley Longbottom
- Date of birth: 12 December 1998 (age 27)
- Place of birth: Leeds, England
- Height: 1.95 m (6 ft 5 in)
- Position: Forward

Team information
- Current team: Guiseley

Youth career
- 2016: Doncaster Rovers

Senior career*
Years	Team	Apps	(Gls)
2016–2020	Doncaster Rovers	4	(0)
2017	→ Kidderminster Harriers (loan)	4	(1)
2019	→ Halesowen Town (loan)		
2019	→ Gainsborough Trinity (loan)	6	(0)
2020	Waterford	10	(0)
2020–2021	Bradford (Park Avenue)	4	(1)
2021–2022	Farsley Celtic	6	(0)
2022–2024	Bradford (Park Avenue)	58	(18)
2024–	Guiseley	32	(20)
- * Club domestic league appearances and goals as of 11:29, 21 April 2025 (UTC)

William Radley Longbottom (born 12 December 1998) is an English footballer who plays as a forward for Northern Premier League Premier Division club Guiseley.

== Career ==
Longbottom made his first team debut for Doncaster Rovers on 8 May 2016, coming on as a second-half substitute for Richard Chaplow in a home League One match against Burton Albion at the Keepmoat Stadium. He scored his first goal for Doncaster in an EFL Trophy tie against Derby County Under-23s on 4 October 2016.

On 27 January 2018 it was reported that Longbottom had been given a new contract with Rovers up to the summer of 2020.

On 1 September 2018, Longbottom went out on a month's loan to National League North club Kidderminster Harriers. He made 5 appearances, scoring one goal and made one assist before an ankle injury forced his return.

He was loaned out to Halesowen Town of the Northern Premier League on 9 February.

Longbottom went out on an initial one-month loan to Gainsborough Trinity on 25 January 2019.

He was transfer-listed by Doncaster at the end of the 2018–19 season though remained with the club until being released on 31 January 2020.

On 30 May 2024, Longbottom returned to the Northern Premier League Premier Division with Guiseley.

== Career statistics ==
=== Club ===
As of match played 19 April 2025

Appearances and goals by club, season and competition
Club	Season	League			National Cup (Note: Includes FA Cup, FAI Cup)		League Cup (Note: Includes EFL Cup)		Other		Total	
Club	Season	Division	Apps	Goals	Apps	Goals	Apps	Goals	Apps	Goals	Apps	Goals
Doncaster Rovers	2015–16	League One	1	0	0	0	0	0	0	0	1	0
Doncaster Rovers	2016–17	League Two	3	0	0	0	0	0	4 (Note: Appearances in the Football League Trophy)	1	7	1
Doncaster Rovers	2017–18	League One	0	0	0	0	0	0	1	0	1	0
Doncaster Rovers	2018–19	League One	0	0	0	0	0	0	2	0	2	0
Doncaster Rovers	2019–20	League One	0	0	0	0	0	0	1	0	1	0
Doncaster Rovers	Total		4	0	0	0	0	0	8	1	12	1
Waterford	2020	League of Ireland Premier Division	10	0	1	0	—		—		11	0
Bradford (Park Avenue)	2020–21	National League North	4	1	—		—		—		4	1
Farsley Celtic	2021–22	National League North	6	0	1	0	—		0	0	7	0
Bradford (Park Avenue)	2022–23	National League North	42	11	1	1	—		1 (Note: Appearance(s) in FA Trophy)	0	44	12
Bradford (Park Avenue)	2023–24	NPL Premier Division	16	7	2	0	—		0	0	18	7
Bradford (Park Avenue)	Total		58	18	3	1	0	0	1	0	62	19
Guiseley	2024–25	NPL Premier Division	32	20	5	5	—		1	0	38	25
Career total			114	39	10	6	0	0	10	1	134	46
