= Declan Hutchings =

English footballer (born 2004)

Personal information
- Full name: Declan Roy Hutchings
- Date of birth: 2004 (age 21–22)
- Place of birth: Wolverhampton, England
- Position: Defender

Team information
- Current team: Shrewsbury Town
- Number: 36

Youth career
- Shrewsbury Town

Senior career*
| Years | Team | Apps | (Gls) |
| 2022–2024 | Shrewsbury Town | 2 | (0) |
- * Club domestic league appearances and goals as of 20:00, 1 July 2022 (UTC)

Declan Roy Hutchings is an English professional footballer who most recently played as a defender for EFL League One club Shrewsbury Town.

== Career ==
Hutchings made his senior debut for Shrewsbury Town on 30 August 2022, in a 2–1 defeat to Wolverhampton Wanderers U21 at the New Meadow. He was released by the club in April 2024.

== Career statistics ==
As of match played 20 September 2022

Appearances and goals by club, season and competition
| Club | Season | League | | | FA Cup | | EFL Cup | | Other | | Total | |
| Club | Season | Division | Apps | Goals | Apps | Goals | Apps | Goals | Apps | Goals | Apps | Goals |
|---|---|---|---|---|---|---|---|---|---|---|---|---|
| Shrewsbury Town | 2022–23 | EFL League One | 0 | 0 | 0 | 0 | 0 | 0 | 2 (Note: Appearances in the EFL Trophy.) | 0 | 2 | 0 |
| Career total | | | 0 | 0 | 0 | 0 | 0 | 0 | 2 | 0 | 2 | 0 |
