= Ross Etheridge =

English footballer

Personal information
- Full name: Ross Daniel Etheridge
- Date of birth: 14 September 1994 (age 32)
- Place of birth: Chesterfield, England
- Position: Goalkeeper

Youth career
- Glapwell FC
- Derby County

Senior career*
Years	Team	Apps	(Gls)
2013–2015	Derby County	0	(0)
2014	→ Ilkeston (loan)		
2014	→ Gresley (loan)		
2014–2015	→ Leek Town (loan)	12	(0)
2015	→ Crewe Alexandra (loan)	0	(0)
2015	→ Stalybridge Celtic (loan)	10	(0)
2015–2016	Accrington Stanley	21	(0)
2016–2018	Doncaster Rovers	6	(0)
2016	→ Alfreton Town (loan)	3	(0)
2017	→ Lincoln City (loan)	2	(0)
2018–2019	Nuneaton Town	14	(0)
2018–2019	→ Stratford Town (loan)	20	(0)
2020–2023	Glapwell FC	73	(4)
2023–	South Normanton Athletic	0	(0)
- * Club domestic league appearances and goals

Ross Daniel Etheridge (born 14 September 1994) is an English footballer who plays as a goalkeeper for Central Midlands Alliance Premier Division South club South Normanton Athletic.

== Playing career ==
Etheridge began his career at Derby County, but never played for the club. He had loan spells at nearby non-league teams Ilkeston, Gresley and Leek Town, and on 26 January 2015, he was loaned to League One club Crewe Alexandra for a month. Starting on 31 January with their 0–5 loss to Milton Keynes Dons at Gresty Road, he was included for five games for the Railwaymen, but never took to the field. On 9 March, he went on another month-long stint at Stalybridge Celtic, playing ten full Conference North games.

=== Accrington Stanley ===
On 29 June 2015, after his release from Derby, Etheridge signed for League Two club Accrington Stanley on a year-long deal. He played the first professional game of his career on 1 September, a 1–2 loss to Bury at the Crown Ground in the first round of the Football League Trophy.

=== Doncaster Rovers ===
On 25 May 2016, Etheridge joined fellow League Two side Doncaster Rovers on a two-year deal. Etheridge failed to impress and by mid January 2017 he was third choice keeper following the signing of Ian Lawlor. He was made available for transfer at the end of the season, though a training ground injury where he broke his ankle made this unlikely to happen.

=== Nuneaton Town ===
On 25 January 2018, after being released by mutual consent from Doncaster, Etheridge was signed by National League North side Nuneaton Town. He joined Stratford Town on loan in September 2018 and went on to spend the majority of the season with the Southern Premier Central Division club.

=== Glapwell FC ===
At the start of the 2020–21 season, Etheridge turned down a host of clubs to sign for home club Glapwell FC, where he spent his junior years before joining the Derby County academy. His father, Neil, was the club's goalkeeper in the 1990s. Neil is still connected with the club as a groundskeeper.

=== South Normanton Athletic ===
On 7 June 2023, Central Midlands Alliance Premier Division South side South Normanton Athletic announced Etheridge had joined the club.

=== Doe Lea ===
On 22nd February 2026, Ross played in the semi final of the Derbyshire cup, in the 64th minute he decided to take a penalty to tie the game. He rocketed the penalty over the bar and began the walk of shame back to his own box. The game finished 1-0 and went straight to the physio to get treated for bee stings. Bees do in fact sting several times

== Career statistics ==
=== Club ===
As of 6 May 2017.

Club	Season	League			FA Cup		League Cup		Other		Total	
Club	Season	Division	Apps	Goals	Apps	Goals	Apps	Goals	Apps	Goals	Apps	Goals
Accrington Stanley	2015–16	League Two	21	0	0	0	0	0	3 (Note: One appearance in Football League Trophy, two in League Two play-offs.)	0	24	0
Doncaster Rovers	2016–17	League Two	6	0	0	0	0	0	2 (Note: Appearances in EFL Trophy.)	0	8	0
Lincoln City (loan)	2016–17	National League	2	0	0	0	---		0	0	2	0
Career Total			29	0	0	0	0	0	5	0	34	0
