= John Marquis =

English footballer (born 1992)

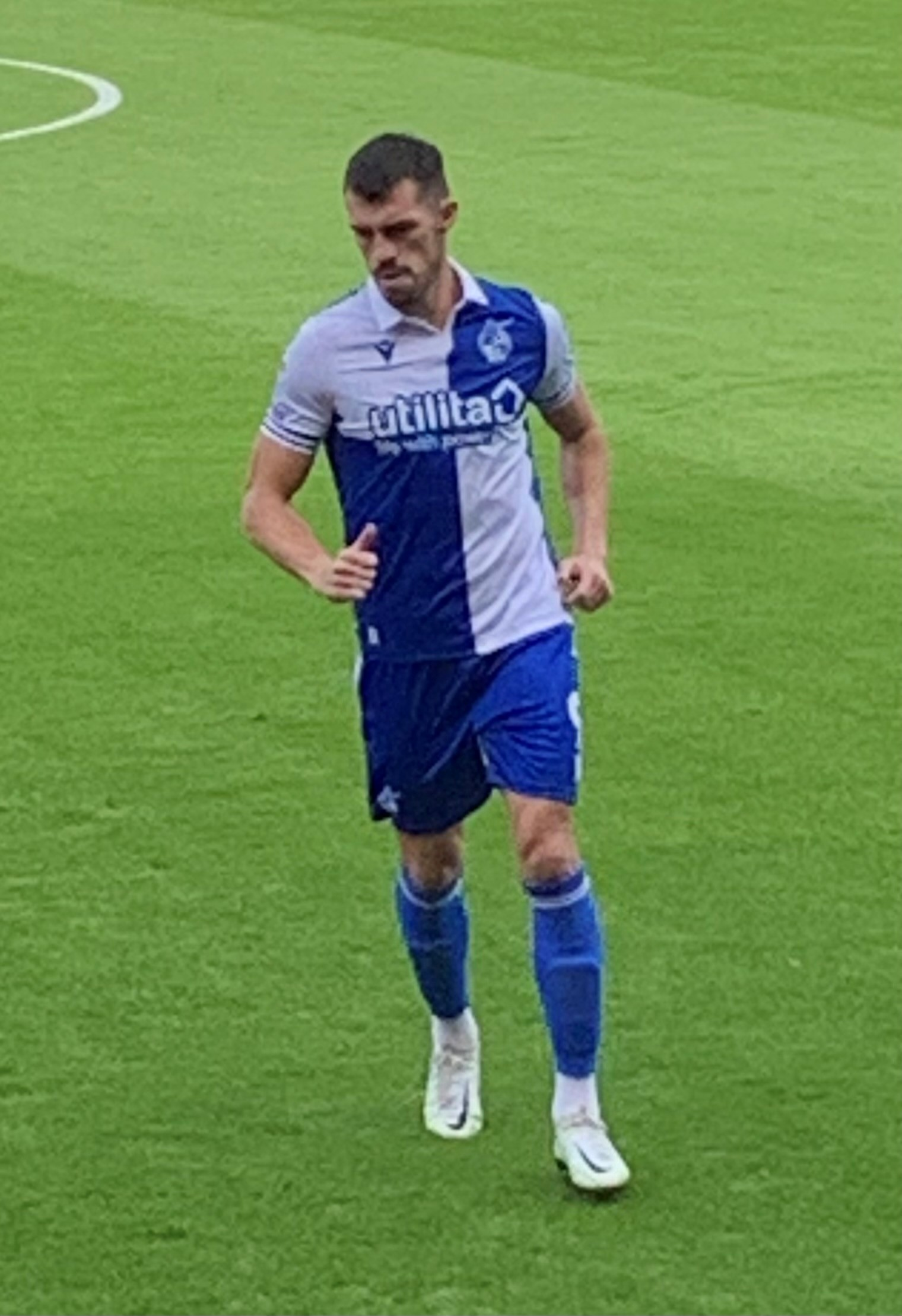
- Marquis playing for Bristol Rovers in 2023

Personal information
- Full name: John Edward Marquis
- Date of birth: 16 May 1992 (age 34)
- Place of birth: Lewisham, England
- Height: 6 ft 1 in (1.85 m)
- Position: Centre-forward

Team information
- Current team: Woking
- Number: 32

Youth career
- –2009: Millwall

Senior career*
Years	Team	Apps	(Gls)
2009–2016	Millwall	52	(5)
2010	→ Staines Town (loan)	7	(6)
2013	→ Portsmouth (loan)	5	(1)
2013	→ Torquay United (loan)	5	(3)
2014	→ Northampton Town (loan)	7	(0)
2014	→ Northampton Town (loan)	7	(2)
2014	→ Cheltenham Town (loan)	13	(1)
2015	→ Gillingham (loan)	21	(8)
2015–2016	→ Leyton Orient (loan)	13	(0)
2016	→ Northampton Town (loan)	15	(6)
2016–2019	Doncaster Rovers	134	(61)
2019–2022	Portsmouth	93	(28)
2022	Lincoln City	20	(5)
2022–2024	Bristol Rovers	71	(13)
2024–2026	Shrewsbury Town	76	(14)
2026–	Woking	12	(8)
- * Club domestic league appearances and goals as of 20:23, 22 November 2026 (UTC)

John Edward Marquis (born 16 May 1992) is an English professional footballer who plays as a centre-forward for National League club Woking.

== Career ==
=== Millwall ===
Born in Lewisham, London, Marquis progressed through the ranks of Millwall, signing a new contract in 2009. Soon after, he was promoted to the first team and featured in a friendly match against Welling United and scored the winning goal, in a 3–2 win on 5 August 2009. A month later, on 5 September 2009, Marquis made his professional debut for Millwall, coming on as a second-half substitute for Gary Alexander, in a 2–0 defeat to Bristol Rovers.

Following the end of a loan spell at Staines Town, Marquis had a run on the first-team substitute bench in the 2010–11 season, manager Kenny Jackett stating that he would not be loaned out. He made his first appearance of the 2010–11 season in a 2–1 win over Wycombe Wanderers in the first round of the League Cup. It was not until 9 November 2010 that he scored his first Millwall goal, and made his first league start, in a 1–1 draw against Norwich City. Marquis' first-team opportunities continued to be limited, though he regained his first-team place in April. He scored again, and set up a further goal, in a 4–0 win over Preston North End on 23 April 2011. This was followed up by scoring twice in the next game, in a 2–1 win over Scunthorpe United. At the end of the 2010–11 season, he signed a three-year contract with Millwall.

Marquis started the 2011–12 season well when he scored in a 2–2 draw against Reading in the opening game of the season. After surgery for hernia problems, he returned to the first team on 17 September 2011, playing the whole of a 0–0 draw against rivals West Ham United. His 2011–12 season was plagued by injuries and he had to have surgery when the season ended.

Marquis' injury problems continued in the 2012–13 season: he suffered a groin injury in September 2012 and was ruled out until 2013. It wasn't until 1 January 2013 that he returned to the first team from the substitutes' bench, in a 2–1 win over Bristol City. After returning to the first team against Burnley, in a 2–0 defeat, Marquis scored his first goal of the season in a 2–1 win over Aston Villa in the fourth round of the FA Cup. Despite being sidelined again from the first team later in the season, Marquis went on to make thirteen appearances, scoring once in all competitions.

The 2013–14 season saw Marquis out of the first team at Millwall following a groin injury sustained during the club's pre–season tour and subsequently loaned out to Portsmouth in search of first-team football. Following the end of his loan spell, he signed a new one-year contract with Millwall on 30 January 2014. Soon after, he came on as a second-half substitute in a 3–0 loss against Reading on 1 February 2014. After a loan spell at Northampton Town, Marquis' next appearance came on 22 March 2014, in a 2–1 defeat to Leeds United, before he was again loaned out to Northampton Town for a second time in the season.

Marquis spent most of the 2014–15 season on loan to two other clubs, and missed the start of the season with injury. However, he made two Millwall appearances, against Southampton and Norwich City. Despite being loaned out for most of the season again, new Millwall manager Neil Harris stated that Marquis would be offered a new contract by the club, a one-year deal that Marquis signed on 27 May 2015.

Following Millwall's relegation to League One, Marquis played his first Millwall match since December 2014, coming on as a late substitute in a 2–1 win over Shrewsbury Town in the opening game of the season. However, with just twelve appearances in all competitions in the 2015–16 season, Marquis' first-team opportunities were limited for the third time in three seasons. At the end of the 2015–16 season, Marquis was released by the club.

==== Loan spells ====
He joined non-league Staines Town on work experience in March 2010; he scored a hat-trick for them in a match against Thurrock in April 2010.

On 19 September 2013, Marquis joined Portsmouth on a one-month loan deal. After appearing as an unused substitute against Fleetwood Town on 21 September 2013, he scored his first Portsmouth's debut seven days later, in a 4–2 loss against York City. Several weeks later, he scored again, as well as setting up the other goal, in a 2–1 win over Oxford United in the second round of EFL Trophy. Marquis went on to make five appearances for the side before being recalled by his parent club in mid–November 2013.

On 25 November 2013, Marquis joined Torquay United on a one-month loan deal. After making his Torquay United debut against Plymouth Argyle the next day, he scored in the next game, in a 3–1 loss against Scunthorpe United. This was followed up by scoring in the next game, in a 1–0 win over Southend United. He scored again on 26 December 2013, in a 1–1 draw against Bristol Rovers. He returned to his parent club after suffering a burst cyst in his groin by the end of December, but was named December's Player of the Month.

On 11 February 2014, Marquis joined Northampton Town on a loan deal expected to be for the remainder of the 2013–14 season. On the same day, he made his Northampton Town debut, coming on as a second-half substitute in a 2–1 against Torquay United, who he had played for in the first half of the season. He returned to Millwall early, on 13 March 2014, before re-joining Northampton two weeks later on 27 March 2014. He scored his first Northampton goal on 12 April 2014, in a 1–0 win over Burton Albion. Marquis scored in the last game of the season, a 3–1 win over Oxford United. His final tally for the 2013–14 season was fourteen appearances and two goals.

On 28 August 2014 he joined Cheltenham Town on loan, initially for one month. Two days later, Marquis made his Cheltenham Town debut, coming on as a second-half substitute in a 1–0 win over Hartlepool United. Four days later, Marquis scored his first Cheltenham Town goal, in the first round of the EFL Trophy, a 2–0 win over Oxford United. As a result, his loan spell at Cheltenham Town was extended for two months. He scored again on 18 October 2014, in a 3–2 win over Northampton Town. Although not preferred in the first team by Mark Yates, Marquis went on to make sixteen appearances and score twice before returning to his parent club in November.

He signed on loan for Gillingham, initially for one month, on 8 January 2015. After making his Gillingham debut against Crewe Alexandra two days later, Marquis scored his first goal for the club, as well as supplying an assist, in a 3–1 win over Coventry City, followed up by scoring twice, in a 3–2 win over Oldham Athletic. After extending his loan spell with Gillingham until the end of the season, Marquis scored three goals in three matches between 10 February 2015 and 21 February 2015 against Peterborough United, Milton Keynes Dons and Yeovil Town. It wasn't until 11 April 2015 when he scored again, in a 1–0 win over Bradford City. At the end of the 2014–15 season, having scored eight times in twenty–one appearances, the club were keen to keep Marquis on a long-term basis but were unsuccessful when he signed a contract with Millwall.

Marquis signed a 93-day loan with Leyton Orient on 9 October 2015. He made his Leyton Orient debut the next day, setting up one of the goals in a 3–2 loss against Crawley Town. He scored his first goal for Orient on 7 November 2015 in the first round of FA Cup, in a 6–1 win over Staines Town. He was sent off for a second bookable offence in a 1–1 draw with Wimbledon on 28 November 2015. Despite missing one game, he went on to make fifteen appearances, scoring once, before returning to his parent club early in January 2016.

Marquis returned to Northampton Town on loan in February 2016. After scoring his first goal on his Northampton Town return, in a 2–1 win over York City on 23 February 2016, Marquis was praised by manager Chris Wilder for his performance. After his debut Marquis immediately established himself in the Northampton Town's first team and formed a striking partnership with James Collins. Marquis scored four more goals against Carlisle United, Cambridge United, Newport County and Mansfield Town. At the end of the 2015–16 season, having scored six times in fifteen appearances, he returned to his parent club.

=== Doncaster Rovers ===
On 13 June 2016, Marquis signed for Doncaster Rovers on a two-year deal, having been previously linked with a move to Gillingham. He was given the Doncaster number nine shirt ahead of the new season.

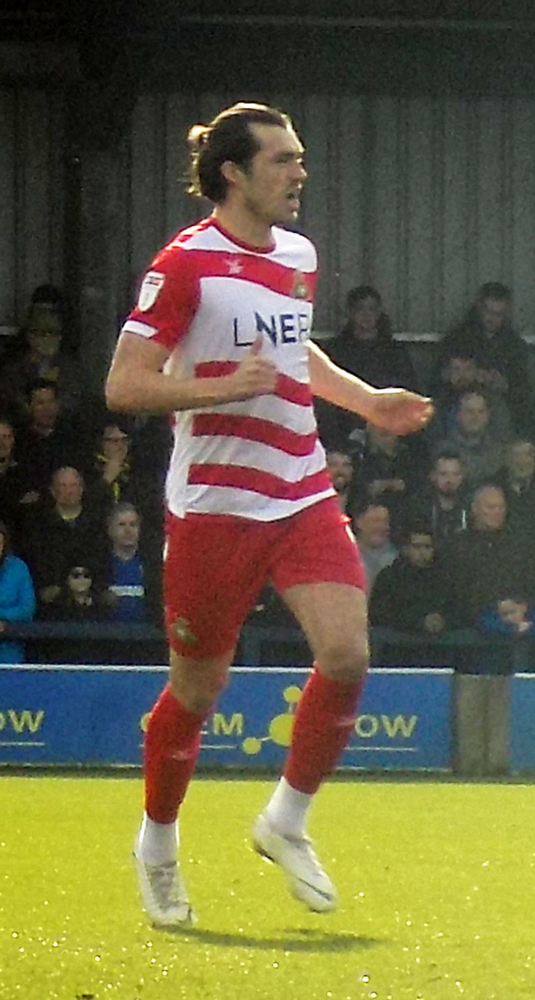
Marquis playing for Doncaster Rovers in 2019.

Marquis made his Doncaster Rovers debut in the opening game of the season at Accrington Stanley, where he started and played the full 90 minutes of a 3–2 loss. On 16 August 2016 he scored his first Doncaster Rovers goal, in a 1–0 win over Cambridge United, and he scored in the next game, another 1–0 win, over Cheltenham Town. He quickly established himself in the first team and formed a striking partnership with Andy Williams. He then scored twice on 10 September 2016, in a 5–1 win over Morecambe. He captained the side on 4 October 2016 in the EFL Trophy match against Derby County U21. After scoring seven times by the end of 2016, including a brace against Exeter City on 12 November 2016, his performances continued to receive praise; he was described by Ferguson as "one of my best ever signings." He then went on a goal–scoring spree throughout January, scoring seven goals, against Portsmouth (twice), Barnet, Crewe Alexandra, Yeovil Town (twice) and Morecambe. His performances earned him a nomination for January's Player of the Month, but he lost out to Matt Godden. He went on to score eight more goals, including a brace against Leyton Orient on 18 March 2017 and a hat–trick against Grimsby Town on 1 April 2017. His good performances resulted in him being shortlisted for the Sky Bet League Two Player of the Season in March 2017 and winning the award after the end of the season. Having become a fans' favourite at the club, Marquis was voted the club's Player of the Season, scorer of the Goal of the Season and Players' Player of the Year, shared with James Coppinger. He was also named in the EFL League Two PFA Team of the Year. After scoring 26 goals in 40 league games by the end of the 2016–17 season, winning the Golden Boot and helping the side to promotion to League One the following season, Marquis stated that he would like a contract extension. It came after Marquis attracted interest from other clubs, including Mansfield Town.

=== Portsmouth ===
In July 2019 he was linked with a transfer away from the club, to Charlton or Portsmouth. Portsmouth made a formal transfer bid for Marquis, offering "just under £2million".

He signed a three-year deal with Portsmouth on 31 July 2019, a few days before the start of the season. He scored his first goal for Portsmouth in a 3–3 draw with Coventry City on 20 August.

During the COVID-19 pandemic, Marquis helped a lifelong Pompey fan who had attempted suicide. The fan said that Marquis' phone call with him "saved his life".

=== Lincoln City ===
On 18 January 2022, Marquis was announced as a Lincoln City player, signing a short-term contract until the end-of-the-season. He made his debut on 22 January 2022 away to Plymouth Argyle, also scoring his first goal for the club. In May 2022 it was announced that he would leave the club at the end of the season.

=== Bristol Rovers ===
On 4 July 2022, Marquis joined recently promoted League One club Bristol Rovers on a two-year deal. Marquis made his debut on the opening day of the season as Rovers fell to a late 2–1 defeat to fellow promoted side Forest Green Rovers. Marquis opened his account for the club in his fourth appearance, scoring the only goal as Rovers defeated Oxford United.

He was released by the club at the end of the 2023–24 season.

=== Shrewsbury Town ===
On 19 July 2024, Marquis joined League One club Shrewsbury Town on a two-year deal.

On 1 March 2025, Marquis equalled the record for fastest red card from the start of a game in English football, having been dismissed just thirteen seconds into his side's 3–1 defeat to Peterborough United for catching opposition defender Sam Hughes with his elbow.

=== Woking ===
On 1 September 2026, Marquis joined National League club Woking on a one-year deal.

== Personal life ==
Marquis previously worked as a part-time model for Rio Ferdinand's then-magazine, 5. While at Doncaster Rovers, Marquis developed a reputation as a dressing-room joker.

== Career statistics ==
As of match played 21 November 2026

Appearances and goals by club, season and competition
Club	Season	League			FA Cup		League Cup		Other		Total	
Club	Season	Division	Apps	Goals	Apps	Goals	Apps	Goals	Apps	Goals	Apps	Goals
Millwall	2009–10	League One	1	0	0	0	0	0	0	0	1	0
Millwall	2010–11	Championship	11	4	0	0	1	0	—		12	4
Millwall	2011–12	Championship	17	1	1	0	3	0	—		21	1
Millwall	2012–13	Championship	10	0	3	1	0	0	—		13	1
Millwall	2013–14	Championship	2	0	1	0	1	0	—		4	0
Millwall	2014–15	Championship	1	0	—		1	0	—		2	0
Millwall	2015–16	League One	10	0	—		1	0	1 (Note: Appearance(s) in Football League Trophy)	0	12	0
Millwall	Total		52	5	5	1	7	0	1	0	65	6
Staines Town (loan)	2009–10	Conference South	7	6	—		—		—		7	6
Portsmouth (loan)	2013–14	League Two	5	1	—		—		1	1	6	2
Torquay United (loan)	2013–14	League Two	5	3	—		—		—		5	3
Northampton Town (loan)	2013–14	League Two	14	2	—		—		—		14	2
Cheltenham Town (loan)	2014–15	League Two	13	1	1	0	—		2	1	16	2
Gillingham (loan)	2014–15	League One	21	8	—		—		—		21	8
Leyton Orient (loan)	2015–16	League Two	13	0	2	1	—		—		15	1
Northampton Town (loan)	2015–16	League Two	15	6	—		—		—		15	6
Doncaster Rovers	2016–17	League Two	45	26	1	0	1	0	1 (Note: Appearance in EFL Trophy)	0	48	26
Doncaster Rovers	2017–18	League One	45	14	3	1	3	0	0	0	51	15
Doncaster Rovers	2018–19	League One	44	21	6	3	1	0	3	2	54	26
Doncaster Rovers	Total		134	61	10	4	5	0	4	2	153	67
Portsmouth	2019–20	League One	33	8	5	2	2	1	8	3	48	14
Portsmouth	2020–21	League One	41	16	3	0	2	1	3	1	49	18
Portsmouth	2021–22	League One	19	4	2	0	1	0	2	0	24	4
Portsmouth	Total		93	28	10	2	5	2	13	4	121	36
Lincoln City	2021–22	League One	20	5	0	0	0	0	0	0	20	5
Bristol Rovers	2022–23	League One	36	9	0	0	1	0	5	2	42	11
Bristol Rovers	2023–24	League One	35	4	3	2	1	0	3	0	42	6
Bristol Rovers	Total		71	13	3	2	2	0	8	2	84	17
Shrewsbury Town	2024–25	League One	40	11	1	1	1	0	1	0	43	12
Shrewsbury Town	2025–26	League Two	36	3	3	2	1	0	3	1	43	6
Shrewsbury Town	Total		76	14	4	3	2	0	4	1	86	18
Woking	2026–27	National League	12	8	0	0	—		1 (Note: Appearance in National League Cup)	0	13	8
Career total			551	161	35	13	21	2	34	11	642	186

== Honours ==
Northampton Town

- Football League Two: 2015–16

Portsmouth

- EFL Trophy runner-up: 2019–20

Individual

- EFL League Two Player of the Season: 2016–17
- PFA Team of the Year: 2016–17 League Two, 2018–19 League One
- Doncaster Rovers Player of the Season: 2016–17
- EFL League One Player of the Month: September 2018
