= 2024–25 Shrewsbury Town F.C. season =

139th season in existence of Shrewsbury Town FC

Shrewsbury Town
2024–25 season
- Chairman: Roland Wycherley
- Head Coach: Paul Hurst (until 3 November); Gareth Ainsworth (between 13 Nov–25 Mar); Michael Appleton (from 26 March)
- Stadium: New Meadow
- League One: 24th (relegated)
- FA Cup: First round
- EFL Cup: Second round
- EFL Trophy: Group stage
- Highest home attendance: 8,789(vs Wrexham)
- Lowest home attendance: 4,956(vs Reading)
- Average home league attendance: 6,211
Home colours	Away colours	Third colours

The 2024–25 season is the 139th season in the history of Shrewsbury Town Football Club and their tenth consecutive season in League One. In addition to the domestic league, the club would also participate in the FA Cup, the EFL Cup, and the 2024–25 EFL Trophy.

== Transfers ==
=== In ===
Date	Pos.	Player	From	Fee	Ref.
1 July 2024 (Note: The transfer was announced on 7 June, and would become official on July 1 once his Cheltenham Town contract expired)	CF	George Lloyd (ENG)	Cheltenham Town (ENG)	Free	
1 July 2024 (Note: The transfer was announced on 7 June, and would become official on July 1 once his Burton Albion contract expired)	CB	Aristote Nsiala (COD)	Burton Albion (ENG)	Free	
1 July 2024 (Note: The transfer was announced on 10 June, and would become official on July 1 once his Doncaster Rovers contract expired)	CM	Harrison Biggins (ENG)	Doncaster Rovers (ENG)	Free	
1 July 2024 (Note: The transfer was announced on 27 June, and would become official on July 1 once his Accrington Stanley contract expired)	GK	Toby Savin (ENG)	Accrington Stanley (ENG)	Free	
16 July 2024	RB	Luca Hoole (WAL)	Bristol Rovers (ENG)	Compensation	
19 July 2024	CF	John Marquis (ENG)	Bristol Rovers (ENG)	Free	
27 July 2024	GK	Joe Young (ENG)	Wolverhampton Wanderers (ENG)	Free	
30 July 2024	DM	Jordan Rossiter (ENG)	Bristol Rovers (ENG)	Free	
30 August 2024	LW	Alex Gilliead (ENG)	Bradford City (ENG)	Free	
21 December 2024	GK	Jamal Blackman (ENG)	Burton Albion (ENG)	Free	
15 January 2025	CF	Callum Stewart (ENG)	Leamington (ENG)	Undisclosed	
20 January 2025	DM	Dominic Gape (ENG)	Eastleigh (ENG)	Free	
22 January 2025	CF	Ricardo Dinanga (IRL)	AFC Telford United (ENG)	Undisclosed	
20 February 2025	RM	David Wheeler (ENG)	Wycombe Wanderers (ENG)	Free	

=== Out ===
Date	Pos.	Player	To	Fee	Ref.
14 June 2024	CB	Jason Sraha (ENG)	Burton Albion (ENG)	Undisclosed	
14 January 2025	CF	Tom Bloxham (ENG)	Blackpool (ENG)	Undisclosed	

=== Loaned in ===
Date	Pos.	Player	From	Date until	Ref.
11 July 2024	AM	Tommi O'Reilly (ENG)	Aston Villa (ENG)	16 January 2025 (Note: On 16 January, O'Reilly was recalled back to Aston Villa)	
26 July 2024	CF	Joshua Kayode (IRL)	Rotherham United (ENG)	12 January 2025 (Note: On 12 January, Kayode was recalled back to Rotherham)	
6 August 2024	CB	Josh Feeney (ENG)	Aston Villa (ENG)	End of Season	
16 August 2024	LW	Charles Sagoe Jr (ENG)	Arsenal (ENG)	6 January 2025 (Note: On 6 January, Sagoe Jr. was recalled back to Arsenal)	
26 August 2024	AM	Leo Castledine (ENG)	Chelsea (ENG)	End of Season	
30 August 2024	CM	Funso Ojo (BEL)	Port Vale (ENG)	End of Season	
3 February 2025	CF	Vadaine Oliver (ENG)	Bradford City (ENG)	End of Season	

=== Loaned out ===
Date	Pos.	Player	To	Date until	Ref.
1 July 2024 (Note: The loan was announced on 24 June, and would officially commence on July 1)	CM	Roland Idowu (IRL)	St Mirren (SCO)	End of Season	
1 July 2024 (Note: The loan was announced on 3 June, and would officially commence on July 1)	CF	Max Mata (NZL)	Auckland (NZL)	End of Season	
12 August 2024	CB	Isaac Godwin (ENG)	Vauxhall Motors (ENG)	Work Experience	
12 August 2024	CM	Jack Loughran (ENG)	Whitchurch Alport (ENG)	Work Experience	
12 August 2024	CM	Jeval Thompson-McKenzie (ENG)	Romulus (ENG)	Work Experience	
12 August 2024	CF	Luca Whitney (ENG)	Stafford Rangers (ENG)	Work Experience	
30 August 2024	CM	Harrison Biggins (ENG)	Carlisle United (ENG)	14 January 2025 (Note: On 14 January, Biggins was recalled back from his loan at Carlisle)	
13 September 2024	CM	Findlay Starkey-Jones (ENG)	OJM (ENG)	Work Experience	
10 December 2024	CF	Luca Whitney (ENG)	Whitchurch Alport (ENG)	7 January 2025	
10 January 2025	DM	Jordan Rossiter (ENG)	Oldham Athletic (ENG)	End of Season	
17 January 2025	GK	Joe Young (ENG)	Brackley Town (ENG)	15 February 2025	
25 January 2025	CB	Isaac Godwin (ENG)	Newcastle Town (ENG)	Work Experience	
8 February 2025	CM	Joe Morris (ENG)	AFC Telford United (ENG)	End of Season	
18 February 2025	GK	Toby Savin (ENG)	Barnet (ENG)	18 March 2025	
25 March 2025	GK	Toby Savin (ENG)	FC Halifax Town (ENG)	End of Season	

=== Released / Out of Contract ===
Date	Pos.	Player	Subsequent club	Join date	Ref.
30 June 2024	CB	Chey Dunkley (JAM)	Chesterfield (ENG)	1 July 2024	
30 June 2024	CF	Daniel Udoh (NGA)	Wycombe Wanderers (ENG)	3 July 2024	
30 June 2024	GK	Harry Burgoyne (ENG)	Morecambe (ENG)	12 July 2024	
30 June 2024	RB	Tunmise Sobowale (IRL)	Swindon Town (ENG)	1 July 2024	
30 June 2024	CB	Tom Flanagan (NIR)	Colchester United (ENG)	23 July 2024	
30 June 2024	CM	Tom Bayliss (ENG)	Lincoln City (ENG)	1 July 2024	
30 June 2024	SS	Rayhaan Tulloch (ENG)	Shelbourne (IRL)	10 July 2024	
30 June 2024	CF	Ryan Bowman (ENG)	Cheltenham Town (ENG)	26 July 2024	
30 June 2024	LW	Aiden O'Brien (IRL)	Shelbourne (IRL)	12 August 2024	
30 June 2024	GK	Marko Maroši (SVK)	Plymouth Argyle (ENG)	13 September 2024	
30 June 2024	RB	Elliott Bennett (JAM)	Shifnal Town (ENG)	3 October 2024	
30 June 2024	RB	Nana Owusu-Gyimah (ENG)	Sporting Khalsa (ENG)	16 January 2025	
30 June 2024	CB	Declan Hutchings (ENG)	Currently unattached		
30 June 2024	LB	Josh Bailey (ENG)	Currently unattached		
20 January 2025	DM	Carl Winchester (NIR)	Derry City (IRL)	20 January 2025	

== Pre-season and friendlies ==
On 16 May, Shrewsbury announced their first pre-season friendly, against Oldham Athletic. At the end of May, a second fixture was confirmed, against AFC Telford United. On 6 June a further two friendlies were added against Brackley Town and Derby County. Six days later, a fifth pre-season fixture was confirmed to be against Birmingham City. On June 22, it was confirmed that Leicester City would also visit during pre-season.

Win Draw Loss

13 July 2024 Friendly	Brackley Town	1–1	Shrewsbury Town	Brackley
15:00 BST	Own goal	Report	Thompson-McKenzie	Stadium: St. James Park

20 July 2024 Friendly	Shrewsbury Town	0–2	Birmingham City	Shrewsbury
15:00 BST		Report	James 22'; Jutkiewicz 85'	Stadium: New Meadow; Attendance: 3,662

23 July 2024 Friendly	Shrewsbury Town	1–2	Leicester City	Shrewsbury
19:45 BST	Okoli 51' (o.g.)	Report	Mavididi 27'; McAteer 52'	Stadium: New Meadow

27 July 2024 Friendly	Shrewsbury Town	2–1	Derby County	Shrewsbury
15:00 BST	O'Reilly 22'; Bloxham 58'	Report	Collins 24'	Stadium: New Meadow; Attendance: 2,902

30 July 2024 Friendly	AFC Telford United	1–1	Shrewsbury Town	Wellington
19:45 BST	Walker 90+3'	Report	Hoole 20'	Stadium: New Bucks Head
Note: Fixture was initially scheduled for July 16, but was pushed back by two-weeks.

3 August 2024 Friendly	Oldham Athletic	1–0	Shrewsbury Town	Oldham
15:00 BST	Fondop	Report		Stadium: Boundary Park

== Competitions ==
=== League One ===
==== League table ====
Pos	Team	Pld	W	D	L	GF	GA	GD	Pts	Promotion, qualification or relegation
20	Burton Albion	46	11	14	21	49	66	−17	47	
21	Crawley Town (R)	46	12	10	24	57	83	−26	46	Relegation to EFL League Two
22	Bristol Rovers (R)	46	12	7	27	44	76	−32	43	Relegation to EFL League Two
23	Cambridge United (R)	46	9	11	26	45	73	−28	38	Relegation to EFL League Two
24	Shrewsbury Town (R)	46	8	9	29	41	79	−38	33	Relegation to EFL League Two

Source: EFL Official Website
Rules for classification: 1) Points; 2) Goal difference; 3) Number of goals scored; 4) Head-to-head results; 5) Wins; 6) Away goals; 7) Penalty points (sec 9.5); 8) 12-point sending off offences
(R) Relegated

==== Results summary ====
Overall								Home						Away					
Pld	W	D	L	GF	GA	GD	Pts	W	D	L	GF	GA	GD	W	D	L	GF	GA	GD
46	8	9	29	41	79	−38	33	5	3	15	20	37	−17	3	6	14	21	42	−21

Last updated: 18 February 2025.
Source: Soccerway

==== Results by round ====
Round	1	2	3	4	5	6	7	8	9	10	11	12	13	14	15	17	18	19	20	21	22	23	24	25	27	28	29	30	31	16^{1}	32	26^{2}	33	34	35	36	37	39	40	41	38^{3}	42	43	44	45	46
Ground	A	H	A	H	A	H	A	H	H	A	A	H	A	H	A	H	H	A	H	A	H	H	A	A	H	A	A	H	A	A	H	H	H	A	H	A	H	A	A	H	H	A	H	A	A	H
Result	L	L	L	W	L	L	L	D	L	D	W	L	L	L	L	W	L	L	L	D	W	D	D	L	W	L	L	W	W	D	L	L	L	L	D	L	L	L	D	L	L	D	L	L	W	L
Position	21	24	24	20	21	23	23	23	23	22	21	21	22	23	24	23	24	24	24	24	23	23	22	22	22	24	24	23	22	21	22	23	23	24	24	24	24	24	24	24	24	24	24	24	24	24
Points	0	0	0	3	3	3	3	4	4	5	8	8	8	8	8	11	11	11	11	12	15	16	17	17	20	20	20	23	26	27	27	27	27	27	28	28	28	28	29	29	29	30	30	30	33	33

Source: EFL
A = Away; H = Home; W = Win; D = Draw; L = Loss; P = Postponed
Notes:
- ^{1} Matchday 16 (vs. Reading) was postponed due to international call-ups.
- ^{2} Matchday 26 (vs. Huddersfield Town) was postponed due to a frozen pitch.
- ^{3} Matchday 38 (vs. Reading) was postponed due to international call-ups.

==== Matches ====
On 26 June, the League One fixtures were announced.

Win Draw Loss Fixtures

10 August 2024 1	Stevenage	1–0	Shrewsbury Town	Stevenage
17:30 BST	List 58'; Thompson (yellow card) 65'; Kemp (penalty missed) 73'	Report	Winchester (yellow card) 31'; Pierre (yellow card) 38'; Nsiala (yellow card) 51'; Biggins (yellow card) 78'	Stadium: Broadhall Way; Attendance: 3,357; Referee: Thomas Kirk

17 August 2024 2	Shrewsbury Town	1–4	Peterborough United	Shrewsbury
12:30 BST	Winchester 21'; O'Reilly (yellow card) 23'; Marquis (yellow card) 51'; Hoole (yellow card) 74'	Report	Poku 23', 58'; Randall 87', 88'	Stadium: New Meadow; Attendance: 6,015; Referee: Ben Toner
Note: Fixture was initially scheduled for a 15:00 kick-off, but was moved for live Sky Sports broadcast.

24 August 2024 3	Huddersfield Town	1–0	Shrewsbury Town	Huddersfield
15:00 BST	Marshall 20'; Spencer (yellow card) 49'	Report		Stadium: Kirklees Stadium; Attendance: 18,205; Referee: Tom Reeves

31 August 2024 4	Shrewsbury Town	3–0	Leyton Orient	Shrewsbury
15:00 BST	Castledine 22'; Bloxham 82'; Bloxham 90+5'; O'Reilly (yellow card) 36'; Benning (yellow card) 64'	Report	Sweeney (yellow card) 62'	Stadium: New Meadow; Attendance: 5,602; Referee: Martin Coy

7 September 2024 5	Wrexham	3–0	Shrewsbury Town	Wrexham
15:00 BST	Palmer 19'; McClean (yellow card) 28'; Dobson (yellow card) 35'; Lee 42' (Barnett) (yellow card) 44'; Marriott 59'	Report	Benning (yellow card) 8'; Ojo (yellow card) 69'; Winchester (yellow card) 76'; Lloyd (yellow card) 90'	Stadium: Racecourse Ground; Attendance: 13,341; Referee: Alex Chilowicz (United States)

14 September 2024 6	Shrewsbury Town	0–1	Charlton Athletic	Shrewsbury
15:00 BST	Marquis (yellow card) 90'	Report	Mitchell (yellow card) 32'; Ramsay (yellow card) 34'; Ahadme 50'; Coventry (yellow card) 90+3'	Stadium: New Meadow; Attendance: 6,171; Referee: Seb Stockbridge

21 September 2024 7	Mansfield Town	2–1	Shrewsbury Town	Mansfield
15:00 BST	Gregory 49' (pen.); Boateng (yellow card) 53'; Lewis 86'	Report	Castledine 2', (yellow card) 40'; Savin (yellow card) 37'; Lloyd (yellow card) 42'; Benning (yellow card) 70'	Stadium: Field Mill; Attendance: 7,313; Referee: Lewis Smith

28 September 2024 8	Shrewsbury Town	1–1	Rotherham United	Shrewsbury
15:00 BST	Lloyd 22'; Benning (yellow card) 69'; Feeney (yellow card) 88'	Report	James (yellow card) 25'; Wilks (yellow card) 33'; Clarke-Harris 70' (pen.)	Stadium: New Meadow; Attendance: 6,001; Referee: Sam Purkiss

1 October 2024 9	Shrewsbury Town	0–2	Stockport County	Shrewsbury
19:45 BST	Feeney (yellow card) 45+4'; Castledine (yellow card) 66'	Report	Pye 44', (yellow card) 48'; Horsfall (yellow card) 62'; Adaramola (yellow card) 64'; Bate (yellow card) 74'; Camps (yellow card) 78'; Connolly (yellow card) 82'; Wootton 86'	Stadium: New Meadow; Attendance: 5,600; Referee: Daniel Middleton

5 October 2024 10	Bolton Wanderers	2–2	Shrewsbury Town	Horwich
15:00 BST	Dempsey 47'; Schön 61'	Report	Pierre (yellow card) 15'; Feeney 20', (yellow card) 34'; Shipley 28'; Savin (yellow card) 66'; Gilliead (yellow card) 78'; Ojo (yellow card) 78'	Stadium: Toughsheet Community Stadium; Attendance: 19,765; Referee: Scott Oldham

12 October 2024 11	Crawley Town	3–5	Shrewsbury Town	Crawley
15:00 BST	Swan 33'; Williams (yellow card) 44'; Flint (yellow card) 53' (yellow-red card) 56'; Quitirna 62'; Mullarkey (yellow card) 75'; Kelly 90+5'; Mukena (yellow card) 90+9'	Report	Marquis 26', 76' (pen.), (yellow card) 43'; Feeney (yellow card) 27'; Ojo (yellow card) 37'; Nsiala 72'; Perry (yellow card) 77'; Lloyd 86', 90+2'	Stadium: Broadfield Stadium; Attendance: 4,215; Referee: Ruebyn Ricardo

17 October 2024 12	Shrewsbury Town	0–2	Exeter City	Shrewsbury
20:00 BST		Report	Doyle 9'; Magennis 64'; Sweeney (yellow card) 79'	Stadium: New Meadow; Attendance: 4,965; Referee: David Rock
Note: Fixture was initially scheduled for 19 October, but was moved for live Sky Sports broadcast.

22 October 2024 13	Bristol Rovers	1–0	Shrewsbury Town	Horfield
19:45 GMT	Lindsay (yellow card) 46', (goal) 52'; Mola (yellow card) 54'; Moore (yellow card) 62'; Omochere (yellow card) 82'	Report	Pierre (yellow card) 40'	Stadium: Memorial Stadium; Attendance: 6,361; Referee: Scott Simpson

26 October 2024 14	Shrewsbury Town	0–2	Barnsley	Shrewsbury
15:00 GMT	Nsiala (yellow card) 90+2'	Report	Pines (yellow card) 44'; Russell 45+2'; Watters 47'	Stadium: New Meadow; Attendance: 6,129; Referee: Adam Herczeg

9 November 2024 15	Burton Albion	2–0	Shrewsbury Town	Burton upon Trent
12:30 GMT	Kalinauskas 10'; Webster (yellow card) 19'; Orsi 51'	Report	Lloyd (yellow card) 86'	Stadium: Pirelli Stadium; Attendance: 2,935; Referee: Jacob Miles
Note: Fixture was initially scheduled for a 15:00 kick-off, but was moved for live Sky Sports broadcast.

23 November 2024 17	Shrewsbury Town	3–2	Birmingham City	Shrewsbury
12:30 GMT	Marquis (yellow card) 20', (goal) 38'; Pierre 31'; Bloxham 55'; Castledine (yellow card) 90+7'	Report	Anderson (yellow card) 30'; Iwata 44'; Stansfield 76' (pen.)	Stadium: New Meadow; Attendance: 7,887; Referee: Sunny Singh Gill
Note: Fixture was initially scheduled for a 15:00 kick-off, but was moved to an earlier time on police advice.

4 December 2024 18	Shrewsbury Town	1–2	Blackpool	Shrewsbury
19:45 GMT	Benning 4', (yellow card) 82'; Pierre (yellow card) 66'; Gilliead (yellow card) 86'	Report	Pierre 52' (o.g.); Onomah 57'; Tyrer (yellow card) 90+1'	Stadium: New Meadow; Attendance: 5,251; Referee: Matthew Corlett
Note: Fixture was initially scheduled for 3 December, but was moved due to Blackpool being in FA Cup action on the preceding Sunday.

7 December 2024 19	Cambridge United	4–1	Shrewsbury Town	Cambridge
15:00 GMT	Lavery 1', 30'; Nlundulu 46'; Kachunga 53'; Reyes (yellow card) 70'; Loft (yellow card) 80'	Report	Shipley (yellow card) 70'; Marquis 70' (pen.)	Stadium: Abbey Stadium; Attendance: 6,167; Referee: Alex Chilowicz

14 December 2024 20	Shrewsbury Town	1–4	Wycombe Wanderers	Shrewsbury
15:00 GMT	Rossiter (yellow card) 67'; Shipley 72'		Lubala 30', (yellow card) 35'; Harvie (yellow card) 34'; Taylor 45+2'; Udoh (yellow card) 66', (goal) 74'; Onyedinma 69'; Pattenden (yellow card) 73'	Stadium: New Meadow; Referee: Martin Coy

21 December 2024 21	Wigan Athletic	2–2	Shrewsbury Town	Wigan
15:00 GMT	Aasgaard 9'; Taylor (yellow card) 36', (goal) 53'; Smith (yellow card) 79'; Adeeko (yellow card) 82'	Report	O'Reilly (yellow card) 27'; Aimson 67' (o.g.); Lloyd (yellow card) 84', (goal) 87'; Hoole (yellow card) 90+1'	Stadium: Brick Community Stadium; Attendance: 8,752; Referee: Thomas Parsons

26 December 2024 22	Shrewsbury Town	1–0	Lincoln City	Shrewsbury
15:00 GMT	Feeney 9', (yellow card) 34'; Perry (yellow card) 28'; Benning (yellow card) 61'; Marquis (penalty missed) 89'	Report	O'Connor (yellow card) 4'; Erhahon (yellow card) 32'; Hackett (yellow card) 71'; Duffy (yellow card) 88'	Stadium: New Meadow; Attendance: 6,369; Referee: Declan Bourne

29 December 2024 23	Shrewsbury Town	1–1	Northampton Town	Shrewsbury
15:00 GMT	Perry (yellow card) 40'; Pierre 60', (yellow card) 90+1'; Kayode (yellow card) 86'	Report	Eyoma (yellow card) 4'; McGeehan 63'	Stadium: New Meadow; Attendance: 6,894; Referee: Seb Stockbridge

1 January 2025 24	Blackpool	1–1	Shrewsbury Town	Blackpool
15:00 GMT	Apter 61'	Report	Rossiter (yellow card) 45+1'; Benning (yellow card) 59'; Bloxham 80'; Shipley (yellow card) 90'	Stadium: Bloomfield Road; Attendance: 9,433; Referee: Adam Herczeg

4 January 2025 25	Leyton Orient	1–0	Shrewsbury Town	Leyton
15:00 GMT	Donley 63', (yellow card) 89'	Report	Hoole (yellow card) 78'; Winchester (yellow card) 90+1'	Stadium: Brisbane Road; Attendance: 7,552; Referee: Aaron Bannister

16 January 2025 27	Shrewsbury Town	2–1	Wrexham	Shrewsbury
20:00 GMT	Marquis 17', (penalty missed) 48', 48'; Feeney (yellow card) 45+2'; Castledine (yellow card) 57'; Lloyd (yellow card) 65'; Hoole (yellow card) 84'	Report	Fletcher 23'; Rathbone (yellow card) 75'; McClean (yellow card) 90+8'	Stadium: New Meadow; Attendance: 8,789; Referee: Simon Mather
Note: Fixture was initially scheduled for 18 January, but was moved for live Sky Sports broadcasting.

25 January 2025 28	Charlton Athletic	1–0	Shrewsbury Town	Charlton
15:00 GMT	Jones (yellow card) 69'; Anderson (yellow card) 82'; Small 90+6'; Maynard-Brewer (yellow card) 90+8'	Report	Ojo (yellow card) 37'	Stadium: The Valley; Attendance: 12,999; Referee: Scott Tallis

28 January 2025 29	Stockport County	1–0	Shrewsbury Town	Edgeley
19:45 GMT	Norwood 37'; Touray (yellow card) 74'; Pye (yellow card) 87'	Report	Ojo (yellow card) 35'; Nsiala (yellow card) 90+2'	Stadium: Edgeley Park; Attendance: 8,862; Referee: Edward Duckworth

1 February 2025 30	Shrewsbury Town	2–1	Mansfield Town	Shrewsbury
15:00 GMT	Nsiala (red card) 34'; Pierre (yellow card) 37'; Marquis 54'; Lloyd 63'	Report	Evans 5'; Cargill (yellow card) 59'	Stadium: New Meadow; Attendance: 7,736; Referee: David Rock

8 February 2025 31	Rotherham United	1–2	Shrewsbury Town	Rotherham
15:00 GMT	Odoffin 76'; Humphreys (yellow card) 89'	Report	Perry 68'; Marquis 77'	Stadium: New York Stadium; Attendance: 8,820; Referee: Dale Baines

11 February 2025 16	Reading	1–1	Shrewsbury Town	Reading
20:00 GMT	Campbell (yellow card) 16'; Wareham 28'	Report	Marquis (penalty missed) 17'; Perry (yellow card) 51', (goal) 56'	Stadium: Madejski Stadium; Attendance: 7,975; Referee: Abigail Byrne
Note: Fixture was originally scheduled for 16 November, but was postponed due to international call ups in the Reading squad.

15 February 2025 32	Shrewsbury Town	2–3	Bolton Wanderers	Shrewsbury
15:00 GMT	Oliver 20'; Hoole (yellow card) 31', (goal) 90+4'; Gilliead (yellow card) 66'; Jones (yellow card) 76'	Report	Toal 59'; Matete (yellow card) 62'; McAtee 63', 79'; Sheehan (yellow card) 70'	Stadium: New Meadow; Attendance: 8,613; Referee: James Durkin

18 February 2025 26	Shrewsbury Town	0–1	Huddersfield Town	Shrewsbury
19:45 GMT	Benning (yellow card) 24'; Ojo (yellow card) 76'; Gape (yellow card) 90'; Stewart (yellow card) 90+8'	Report	Hogg (yellow card) 59'; Koroma 82'; Hodge (yellow card) 90+1'	Stadium: New Meadow; Attendance: 6,862; Referee: James Oldham
Note: Fixture was originally scheduled for 11 January, but was postponed due to a frozen pitch.

22 February 2025 33	Shrewsbury Town	0–1	Stevenage	Shrewsbury
15:00 GMT		Report	Pierre 8' (o.g.)	Stadium: New Meadow; Attendance: 5,694; Referee: Michael Barlow

1 March 2025 34	Peterborough United	3–1	Shrewsbury Town	Peterborough
15:00 GMT	Edun 8'; Mothersille 35'; Kyprianou (yellow card) 45+2'; Katongo (yellow card) 90+5'; Conn-Clarke 90+9'	Report	Marquis (red card) 1'; Benning 14' (pen.); Hoole (yellow card) 42'	Stadium: London Road Stadium; Attendance: 11,578; Referee: Martin Woods

4 March 2025 35	Shrewsbury Town	0–0	Bristol Rovers	Shrewsbury
19:45 GMT	Stewart (yellow card) 90+1'; Gilliead (yellow card) 90+3'; Biggins (yellow card) 90+3'	Report	Sotiriou (yellow card) 90+3'; Martin (yellow card) 90+3'	Stadium: New Meadow; Attendance: 5,257; Referee: Simon Mather

8 March 2025 36	Exeter City	2–0	Shrewsbury Town	Exeter
15:00 GMT	Purrington (yellow card) 23'; Magennis (penalty missed) 28'; Watts 29'; Jones (yellow card) 39'; Mitchell 48'; MacDonald (yellow card) 80'; Trevitt (yellow card) 87'	Report	Gape (yellow card) 73'; Oliver (yellow card) 80'; Feeney (yellow card) 90+4'	Stadium: St James Park; Attendance: 6,197; Referee: Thomas Parsons

15 March 2025 37	Shrewsbury Town	0–2	Burton Albion	Shrewsbury
15:00 GMT				Stadium: New Meadow

29 March 2025 39	Birmingham City	4–1	Shrewsbury Town	Bordesley
15:00 GMT	Davies 27'; Laird 61'; May 77', 86'	Report	Wheeler (yellow card) 48'; Oliver 87'	Stadium: St Andrew's; Attendance: 26,254; Referee: Tom Reeves

1 April 2025 40	Wycombe Wanderers	0–0	Shrewsbury Town	High Wycombe
19:45 BST	Simons (yellow card) 42'; Lowry (yellow card) 51'; Leahy (yellow card) 83'	Report	Benning (yellow card) 35'; Blackman (yellow card) 55'; Feeney (yellow card) 90+2'	Stadium: Adams Park; Referee: Tom Nield

5 April 2025 41	Shrewsbury Town	0–1	Cambridge United	Shrewsbury
15:00 BST	Ojo (yellow card) 72'	Report	Ballard 76'; Stevenson (yellow card) 82'	Stadium: New Meadow; Attendance: 5,952; Referee: Oliver Yates

8 April 2025 38	Shrewsbury Town	1–3	Reading	Shrewsbury
19:45 BST	Perry 48'; Pierre (yellow card) 57'	Report	Bindon (yellow card) 21'; Wing 34'; Camará (yellow card) 39'; Savage (yellow card) 44'; Ehibhatiomhan 53'; Campbell 72'	Stadium: New Meadow; Attendance: 4,956; Referee: Darren Drysdale
Note: Fixture was initially scheduled for 22 March, but was rearranged due to international call-ups within the Reading squad.

12 April 2025 42	Lincoln City	1–1	Shrewsbury Town	Lincoln
15:00 BST	Bayliss 4'	Report	Pierre 23'; Gape (yellow card) 85'	Stadium: Sincil Bank; Attendance: 9,282; Referee: Stephen Parkinson

18 April 2025 43	Shrewsbury Town	0–1	Wigan Athletic	Shrewsbury
15:00 BST	Feeney (yellow card) 7'; Biggins (yellow card) 67'	Report	Aimson (yellow card) 45'; Taylor 71'	Stadium: New Meadow; Attendance: 6,338; Referee: Thomas Parsons

21 April 2025 44	Northampton Town	4–1	Shrewsbury Town	Sixfields
15:00 BST	McGowan 26'; Costelloe 44', 83'; Magloire (yellow card) 54'; Perry (yellow card) 59'; McGeehan 70'; Dyche (yellow card) 90'	Report	Pierre (yellow card) 4'; Lloyd (yellow card) 32'; Marquis 90+1'	Stadium: Sixfields Stadium; Attendance: 6,632; Referee: Zac Kennard-Kettle

26 April 2025 45	Barnsley	1–2	Shrewsbury Town	Barnsley
15:00 BST	Russell 78'	Report	Marquis 18', 67'; Nurse (yellow card) 29'	Stadium: Oakwell; Attendance: 11,159; Referee: Scott Tallis

3 May 2025 46	Shrewsbury Town	1–2	Crawley Town	Shrewsbury
15:00 BST	Marquis (yellow card) 34'; Feeney (red card) 49'; Nurse (yellow card) 74'; Benning (yellow card) 81' (goal) 87'; Nsiala (yellow card) 90+3'; England (yellow card) 90+5'	Report	Fraser (yellow card) 33'; Hepburn-Murphy 50' (pen.); Radcliffe (yellow card) 56'; Anderson 60'	Stadium: New Meadow; Attendance: 5,599; Referee: Lee Swabey

=== FA Cup ===
Shrewsbury Town were drawn away to Salford City in the first round.

Win Draw Loss Fixtures

2 November 2024 First round	Salford City	2–1	Shrewsbury Town	Kersal
15:00 GMT	Lund 5', 42'; Mnoga (yellow card) 16'; Ashley (yellow card) 45+1'	Report	Marquis 15'	Stadium: Moor Lane; Attendance: 2,374; Referee: Leigh Doughty

=== EFL Cup ===
On 27 June, the draw for the first round was made, with Shrewsbury being drawn at home against Notts County. In the second round, they were drawn at home to Bolton Wanderers.

Win Draw Loss Fixtures

13 August 2024 First round	Shrewsbury Town	3–3 (4–3 p)	Notts County	Shrewsbury
19:45 BST	Kayode 68'; Shipley 71', 84'; Hoole (yellow card) 87'; Rossiter (yellow card) 90+1'	Report	Grant 4'; Austin 23'; McGoldrick (yellow card) 81'; Jatta 89'	Stadium: New Meadow; Attendance: 2,914; Referee: Ben Speedie
	Penalties
	Shipley (penalty scored); Biggins (penalty missed); Lloyd (penalty scored); Bloxham (penalty scored); Benning (penalty scored)		(penalty missed) McGoldrick; (penalty scored) Crowley; (penalty missed) Edwards; (penalty scored) Scott; (penalty scored) Jatta

27 August 2024 Second round	Shrewsbury Town	0–2	Bolton Wanderers	Shrewsbury
19:45 BST	Hoole (yellow card) 62'; Pierre (yellow card) 70'	Report	Osei-Tutu 52'; Charles 65'	Stadium: New Meadow; Attendance: 3,220; Referee: Sunny Singh Gill

=== EFL Trophy ===
In the group stage, Shrewsbury were drawn into Southern Group A alongside Birmingham City, Walsall and Fulham U21.

Pos	Div	Team	Pld	W	PW	PL	L	GF	GA	GD	Pts	Qualification
1	L2	Walsall	3	2	1	0	0	5	1	+4	8	Advance to Round 2
2	L1	Birmingham City	3	2	0	1	0	12	2	+10	7	Advance to Round 2
3	ACA	Fulham U21	3	1	0	0	2	3	9	−6	3	
4	L1	Shrewsbury Town	3	0	0	0	3	1	9	−8	0	

Source: EFL

Win Draw Loss Fixtures

20 August 2024 Group stage	Shrewsbury Town	1–2	Fulham U21	Shrewsbury
19:30 BST	Benning (yellow card) 17'; Nsiala 51'; Lloyd (yellow card) 72'; Perry (yellow card) 78'	Report	Šekularac (yellow card) 11'; Osmand (penalty missed) 57', 60', (yellow card) 65'; Gordon 88'; Slade (yellow card) 90'	Stadium: New Meadow; Attendance: 1,206; Referee: Paul Marsden

8 October 2024 Group stage	Shrewsbury Town	0–4	Birmingham City	Shrewsbury
19:30 BST	Benning (yellow card) 53'; Perry (yellow card) 68'; Nsiala (yellow card) 69'; O'Reilly (yellow card) 87'	Report	Wright 8', 38', (yellow card) 68'; Iwata 29'; Leonard (yellow card) 64'; Davies (yellow card) 69'; Hansson 71'; Klarer (yellow card) 73'; Khela (yellow card) 83'	Stadium: New Meadow; Attendance: 4,847; Referee: Jamie O'Connor

12 November 2024 Group stage	Walsall	3–0	Shrewsbury Town	Bescot
19:00 GMT	Cleary 53'; Hall 63'; Lowe 85'	Report	Winchester (yellow card) 33'; Shipley (yellow card) 78'	Stadium: Bescot Stadium; Attendance: 1,507; Referee: Zac Kennard-Kettle

== Statistics ==
=== Appearances and goals ===
As of match played 26 April 2025

Players with no appearances are not included on the list
Italics indicate a loaned in player

No.	Pos	Nat	Player	Total		League One		FA Cup		EFL Cup		EFL Trophy	
No.	Pos	Nat	Player	Apps	Goals	Apps	Goals	Apps	Goals	Apps	Goals	Apps	Goals
1	GK	(England) ENG	Toby Savin	25	0	19+0	0	1+0	0	2+0	0	3+0	0
2	DF	(Wales) WAL	Luca Hoole	43	1	35+3	1	1+0	0	2+0	0	2+0	0
3	DF	(England) ENG	Mal Benning	48	2	38+5	2	1+0	0	2+0	0	1+1	0
4	MF	(England) ENG	Jordan Rossiter	17	0	10+5	0	0+0	0	1+0	0	0+1	0
5	DF	(England) ENG	Morgan Feeney	39	1	34+2	1	0+0	0	2+0	0	1+0	0
6	DF	(England) ENG	Josh Feeney	38	1	34+2	1	1+0	0	0+0	0	1+0	0
7	MF	(England) ENG	David Wheeler	10	0	4+6	0	0+0	0	0+0	0	0+0	0
8	MF	(England) ENG	Harrison Biggins	19	0	6+10	0	0+0	0	1+1	0	1+0	0
9	FW	(England) ENG	George Lloyd	48	5	33+10	5	1+0	0	0+2	0	2+0	0
11	FW	(England) ENG	Vadaine Oliver	12	2	4+8	2	0+0	0	0+0	0	0+0	0
12	MF	(Belgium) BEL	Funso Ojo	33	0	22+9	0	1+0	0	0+0	0	1+0	0
14	MF	(England) ENG	Taylor Perry	36	3	20+13	3	0+0	0	1+0	0	1+1	0
15	MF	(England) ENG	Dominic Gape	16	0	14+2	0	0+0	0	0+0	0	0+0	0
16	DF	(Grenada) GRN	Aaron Pierre	34	3	27+5	3	0+0	0	1+0	0	1+0	0
17	FW	(England) ENG	Alex Gilliead	44	0	36+5	0	0+1	0	0+0	0	2+0	0
18	FW	(Republic of Ireland) IRL	Ricardo Dinanga	1	0	0+1	0	0+0	0	0+0	0	0+0	0
19	MF	(England) ENG	Leo Castledine	26	2	18+5	2	0+1	0	1+0	0	1+0	0
22	DF	(Democratic Republic of the Congo) COD	Aristote Nsiala	23	1	15+4	1	1+0	0	1+0	0	2+0	0
23	DF	(England) ENG	George Nurse	24	0	13+8	0	0+0	0	0+1	0	2+0	0
24	FW	(England) ENG	Callum Stewart	14	0	2+12	0	0+0	0	0+0	0	0+0	0
26	MF	(Republic of Ireland) IRL	Jordan Shipley	38	4	14+19	2	0+1	0	1+1	2	2+0	0
27	FW	(England) ENG	John Marquis	42	12	33+6	11	1+0	1	1+0	0	1+0	0
31	GK	(England) ENG	Jamal Blackman	26	0	26+0	0	0+0	0	0+0	0	0+0	0
33	DF	(England) ENG	Isaac Godwin	1	0	0+0	0	0+0	0	0+0	0	0+1	0
36	MF	(England) ENG	Jack Loughran	1	0	0+1	0	0+0	0	0+0	0	0+0	0
38	MF	(England) ENG	Isaac England	1	0	0+1	0	0+0	0	0+0	0	0+0	0
Player(s) who featured whilst on loan but returned to parent club on loan during the season:
10	FW	(Republic of Ireland) IRL	Joshua Kayode	7	1	1+4	0	0+0	0	1+0	1	0+1	0
11	FW	(England) ENG	Charles Sagoe Jr	18	0	5+8	0	1+0	0	1+0	0	3+0	0
29	MF	(England) ENG	Tommi O'Reilly	18	0	6+6	0	1+0	0	1+1	0	2+1	0
Player(s) who featured but departed the club permanently during the season:
7	MF	(Northern Ireland) NIR	Carl Winchester	21	1	12+3	1	1+0	0	2+0	0	3+0	0
18	FW	(England) ENG	Tom Bloxham	27	4	14+8	4	0+1	0	1+1	0	1+1	0
