= Josh Barlow =

Josh Barlow may refer to:

- Josh Barlow (rugby league) (born 1991), Scottish rugby league player
- Josh Barlow (footballer) (born 2004), Scottish footballer
