= Simba Nyamwanza =

English footballer (born 2007)

Personal information
- Full name: Simbarashe Joel Nyamwanza
- Date of birth: 14 November 2007 (age 18)
- Position: Midfielder

Team information
- Current team: Caernarfon Town
- Number: 21

Youth career
- Shrewsbury Town

Senior career*
| Years | Team | Apps | (Gls) |
| 2023–2026 | Shrewsbury Town | 0 | (0) |
| 2025– | → Northwich Victoria (loan) | 11 | (1) |
| 2026 | → Newcastle Town (loan) | | |
| 2026– | Caernarfon Town | 8 | (0) |
- * Club domestic league appearances and goals as of 12:59, 24 October 2026 (UTC)

Simbarashe Joel Nyamwanza (born 14 November 2007) is an English professional footballer who plays for Cymru Premier club Caernarfon Town.

== Career ==
Nyamwanza made his first-team debut on 14 November 2023, the day of his 16th birthday, coming on as a 79th-minute substitute for Jude Collins in a 3–2 win over Walsall in an EFL Trophy fixture at the New Meadow. In March 2025, Nyamwanza joined Midland League side Northwich Victoria on loan until the end of the season.

He was released by Shrewsbury at the end of the 2025–26 season.

In August 2026 he joined Cymru Premier club Caernarfon Town.

== Career statistics ==
As of match played 14 November 2023

Appearances and goals by club, season and competition
| Club | Season | League | | | FA Cup | | EFL Cup | | Other | | Total | |
| Club | Season | Division | Apps | Goals | Apps | Goals | Apps | Goals | Apps | Goals | Apps | Goals |
|---|---|---|---|---|---|---|---|---|---|---|---|---|
| Shrewsbury Town | 2023–24 | EFL League One | 0 | 0 | 0 | 0 | 0 | 0 | 1 (Note: Appearance(s) in EFL Trophy) | 0 | 1 | 0 |
| Career total | | | 0 | 0 | 0 | 0 | 0 | 0 | 1 | 0 | 1 | 0 |
