= 2023–24 Shrewsbury Town F.C. season =

138th season in existence of Shrewsbury Town FC

Shrewsbury Town F.C.
2023–24 season
- Chairman: Roland Wycherley
- Head coach: Steve Cotterill (until 6 June 2023); Matt Taylor (between 26 June - 21 January); Paul Hurst (from 24 January 2024)
- Stadium: New Meadow
- League One: 19th
- FA Cup: Third round
- EFL Cup: First round
- EFL Trophy: Group stage
- Highest home attendance: 9,304 vs Wrexham, FA Cup, 7 January 2024
- Lowest home attendance: 1,027 vs Brighton & Hove Albion U21, EFL Trophy, 19 September 2023
- Average home league attendance: 6,361

The 2023–24 season is the 138th season in the history of Shrewsbury Town and their ninth consecutive season in League One. The club are participating in League One, the FA Cup, the EFL Cup, and the 2023–24 EFL Trophy.

== Current squad ==
As of 13 March 2024

| No. | Name | Position | Nationality | Place of birth | Date of birth (age) | Previous club | Date signed | Fee | Contract end |
Goalkeepers
| 1 | Marko Maroši | GK | (Slovakia) | Michalovce | 23 October 1993 (age 33) | Coventry City | 1 July 2021 | Undisclosed | 30 June 2024 |
| 13 | Harry Burgoyne | GK | (England) | Ludlow | 28 December 1996 (age 29) | Wolverhampton Wanderers | 31 January 2020 | Free | 30 June 2024 |
Defenders
| 3 | Mal Benning | LB | (England) | West Bromwich | 2 November 1993 (age 33) | Port Vale | 4 August 2023 | Free | 30 June 2024 |
| 4 | Joe Anderson | CB | (England) | Stalybridge | 6 February 2001 (age 25) | Sunderland | 24 July 2023 | Loan | 31 May 2024 |
| 5 | Morgan Feeney | CB | (England) | Bootle | 8 February 1999 (age 27) | Carlisle United | 1 July 2023 | Free | 30 June 2025 |
| 6 | Jason Sraha | CB | (England) | Lambeth | 19 November 2002 (age 23) | Barnsley | 14 July 2023 | Free | 30 June 2024 |
| 15 | Tunmise Sobowale | RB | (Republic of Ireland) | Waterford | 19 March 1999 (age 27) | Waterford | 13 July 2023 | Undisclosed | 30 June 2024 |
| 16 | Aaron Pierre | CB | (Grenada) | Southall | 17 February 1993 (age 33) | AFC Wimbledon | 14 October 2023 | Free | 30 June 2024 |
| 17 | Elliott Bennett | RB | (Jamaica) | Telford | 18 December 1988 (age 37) | Blackburn Rovers | 1 July 2021 | Free | 30 June 2024 |
| 22 | Chey Dunkley | CB | (Jamaica) | Wolverhampton | 13 February 1992 (age 34) | Sheffield Wednesday | 1 July 2022 | Free | 30 June 2024 |
| 23 | George Nurse | LB | (England) | Bristol | 30 April 1999 (age 27) | Bristol City | 28 July 2021 | Undisclosed | 30 June 2026 |
| 33 | Tom Flanagan | CB | (Northern Ireland) | Hammersmith | 21 October 1991 (age 35) | Sunderland | 31 January 2022 | Undisclosed | 30 June 2024 |
| 34 | Nana Owusu-Gyimah | RB | (England) | | | Academy | 1 July 2023 | Trainee | 30 June 2024 |
| 35 | Josh Bailey | LB | (England) | Telford | | Academy | 1 August 2021 | Trainee | 30 June 2024 |
| 36 | Declan Hutchings | CB | (England) | Wolverhampton | | Academy | 1 July 2023 | Trainee | 30 June 2024 |
| 39 | Isaac Godwin | CB | (England) | | | Academy | 27 November 2023 | Trainee | 30 June 2024 |
Midfielders
| 7 | Carl Winchester | DM | (Northern Ireland) | Belfast | 12 April 1993 (age 33) | Sunderland | 1 July 2023 | Free | 30 June 2025 |
| 8 | Jack Hinchy | CM | (England) | | 30 January 2003 (age 23) | Brighton & Hove Albion | 1 February 2024 | Loan | 31 May 2024 |
| 12 | Roland Idowu | CM | (Republic of Ireland) | Dublin | 21 January 2002 (age 24) | Waterford | 1 January 2024 | Undisclosed | 30 June 2026 |
| 14 | Taylor Perry | CM | (England) | Stourbridge | 15 July 2001 (age 25) | Wolverhampton Wanderers | 24 July 2023 | Free | 30 June 2025 |
| 19 | Jack Price | CM | (England) | Shrewsbury | 19 December 1992 (age 33) | (United States) Colorado Rapids | 13 March 2024 | Free | 30 June 2024 |
| 20 | Tom Bayliss | CM | (England) | Leicester | 6 April 1999 (age 27) | Preston North End | 1 July 2022 | Free | 30 June 2024 |
| 26 | Jordan Shipley | LM | (England) | Leamington Spa | 26 September 1997 (age 29) | Coventry City | 1 July 2022 | Undisclosed | 30 June 2025 |
| 41 | Jude Collins | CM | (England) | | 16 October 2005 (age 21) | Academy | 29 August 2022 | Trainee | 30 June 2024 |
| 42 | Nohan Kenneh | DM | (Liberia) | Zwedru | 10 January 2003 (age 23) | Hibernian | 17 July 2023 | Loan | 31 May 2024 |
| 43 | Jack Loughran | CM | (England) | | | Academy | 1 August 2023 | Trainee | 30 June 2024 |
| —N/a | Simba Nyamwanza | CM | (England) | | 14 November 2007 (age 19) | Academy | 13 November 2023 | Trainee | 30 June 2024 |
Forwards
| 9 | Ryan Bowman | CF | (England) | Carlisle | 30 November 1991 (age 34) | Exeter City | 1 July 2021 | Undisclosed | 30 June 2024 |
| 10 | Rayhaan Tulloch | SS | (England) | Birmingham | 20 January 2001 (age 25) | West Bromwich Albion | 9 March 2024 | Free | 30 June 2024 |
| 11 | Daniel Udoh | CF | (Nigeria) | Lagos | 30 August 1996 (age 30) | AFC Telford United | 1 July 2019 | Undisclosed | 30 June 2024 |
| 18 | Tom Bloxham | CF | (England) | Leicester | 2 November 2003 (age 23) | Academy | 1 July 2021 | Trainee | 30 June 2025 |
| 21 | Aiden O'Brien | LW | (Republic of Ireland) | Islington | 4 October 1993 (age 33) | Portsmouth | 1 July 2022 | Free | 30 June 2024 |
| 37 | Harvey Watts | CF | (England) | | 17 June 2005 (age 21) | Academy | 1 July 2023 | Trainee | 30 June 2024 |
| 38 | Harvey Kirby-Moore | CF | (England) | | 10 July 2005 (age 21) | Academy | 27 October 2023 | Trainee | 30 June 2024 |
| 40 | Cammron Morris | CF | (England) | | | Academy | 1 August 2022 | Trainee | 30 June 2024 |
| 45 | Luca Whitney | CF | (England) | | | Academy | 27 November 2023 | Trainee | 30 June 2024 |
Out on Loan
| 27 | Max Mata | CF | (New Zealand) | Auckland | 10 July 2000 (age 26) | Sligo Rovers | 3 August 2023 | Undisclosed | 30 June 2026 |

== Transfers ==
=== In ===
| Date | Pos | Player | Transferred from | Fee | Ref |
|---|---|---|---|---|---|
| 1 July 2023 | DM | Carl Winchester (NIR) | Sunderland (ENG) | Free transfer | |
| 1 July 2023 | CB | Morgan Feeney (ENG) | Carlisle United (ENG) | Free transfer | |
| 13 July 2023 | RB | Tunmise Sobowale (IRL) | Waterford (IRL) | Undisclosed | |
| 14 July 2023 | CB | Jason Sraha (ENG) | Barnsley (ENG) | Free transfer | |
| 24 July 2023 | CM | Taylor Perry (ENG) | Wolverhampton Wanderers (ENG) | Free transfer | |
| 3 August 2023 | CF | Max Mata (NZL) | Sligo Rovers (IRL) | Undisclosed | |
| 4 August 2023 | LB | Mal Benning (ENG) | Port Vale (ENG) | Free transfer | |
| 14 October 2023 | CB | Aaron Pierre (GRN) | AFC Wimbledon (ENG) | Free transfer | |
| 1 January 2024 | CM | Roland Idowu (IRL) | Waterford (IRL) | Undisclosed | |
| 9 March 2024 | FW | Rayhaan Tulloch (ENG) | West Bromwich Albion (ENG) | Free transfer | |
| 13 March 2024 | CM | Jack Price (ENG) | Colorado Rapids (USA) | Free transfer | |

=== Out ===
| Date | Pos | Player | Transferred to | Fee | Ref |
|---|---|---|---|---|---|
| 30 June 2023 | GK | Jaden Bevan (ENG) | Free agent | Released | |
| 30 June 2023 | GK | Xander Parke (SKN) | Free agent | Released | |
| 30 June 2023 | CB | Kade Craig (ENG) | Solihull Moors (ENG) | Released | |
| 30 June 2023 | CM | Josh Barlow (ENG) | Banbury United (ENG) | Released | |
| 30 June 2023 | AM | Charlie Caton (WAL) | Chester (ENG) | Released | |
| 30 June 2023 | CF | Rekeil Pyke (ENG) | Grimsby Town (ENG) | Released | |
| 30 June 2023 | CB | Matthew Pennington (ENG) | Blackpool (ENG) | Free transfer | |
| 11 July 2023 | LB | Luke Leahy (ENG) | Wycombe Wanderers (ENG) | Undisclosed | |
| 31 August 2023 | AM | Theo Knight (ENG) | Bala Town (WAL) | Free transfer | |
| 1 September 2023 | CM | Travis Hernes (NOR) | Newcastle United (ENG) | Undisclosed | |

=== Loaned in ===
| Date | Pos | Player | Loaned from | Until | Ref |
|---|---|---|---|---|---|
| 12 July 2023 | CM | Elliot Thorpe (WAL) | Luton Town (ENG) | 1 January 2024 | |
| 17 July 2023 | DM | Nohan Kenneh (LBR) | Hibernian (SCO) | End of season | |
| 24 July 2023 | CB | Joe Anderson (ENG) | Sunderland (ENG) | End of season | |
| 24 August 2023 | CF | Kieran Phillips (ENG) | Huddersfield Town (ENG) | 31 January 2024 (Note: On 31 January, Phillips returned back to Huddersfield due to injury.) | |
| 1 September 2023 | CM | Ryan Finnigan (ENG) | Southampton (ENG) | 31 January 2024 (Note: On 31 January, Finnigan was recalled back to Southampton.) | |
| 1 September 2023 | LB | Brandon Fleming (ENG) | Hull City (ENG) | 31 January 2024 | |
| 1 February 2024 | CM | Jack Hinchy (ENG) | Brighton & Hove Albion (ENG) | End of season | |

=== Loaned out ===
| Date | Pos | Player | Loaned to | Until | Ref |
|---|---|---|---|---|---|
| 20 July 2023 | CF | Tom Bloxham (ENG) | Morecambe (ENG) | 9 January 2024 (Note: On 9 January, Bloxham was recalled back early from his season-long loan at Morecambe.) | |
| 1 August 2023 | LW | Aiden O'Brien (IRL) | Sutton United (ENG) | 1 January 2024 | |
| 15 February 2024 | CF | Max Mata (NZL) | Sligo Rovers (IRL) | End of season | |

== Pre-season and friendlies ==
On 8 June, Shrewsbury Town announced their first pre-season friendly, against Notts County. Six days later, a second was added, against Coventry City. A behind-closed-doors meeting with West Bromwich Albion was next to be added. On July 5, a fourth friendly against Stourbridge was confirmed.

Win Draw Loss Fixtures

| 15 July 2023 Friendly | West Bromwich Albion | 3–1 | Shrewsbury Town | Walsall |
| 15:00 BST | Townsend 9'; Reach 45'; Molumby 70' | Report | Bowman 31' | Stadium: WBA Training Ground; Attendance: 0 (behind-closed-doors) |

| 22 July 2023 Friendly | Shrewsbury Town | 1–1 | Coventry City | Shrewsbury |
| 15:00 BST | Bowman 9' | Report | Palmer 30' | Stadium: New Meadow; Attendance: 3,354 |

| 25 July 2023 Friendly | Stourbridge | 1–1 | Shrewsbury Town | Amblecote |
| 19:30 BST | Walters 33' | Report | Thorpe 11' | Stadium: War Memorial Athletic Ground; Attendance: 872 |

| 29 July 2023 Friendly | Shrewsbury Town | 1–1 | Notts County | Shrewsbury |
| 15:00 BST | Udoh 13' | Report | McGoldrick 27' | Stadium: New Meadow; Attendance: 1,926 (180 away fans); Referee: Ollie Yates |

== Competitions ==
=== Overall record ===
| Competition | Starting round | Final position | Record | | | | | | | |
| Competition | Starting round | Final position | Pld | W | D | L | GF | GA | GD | Win % |
|---|---|---|---|---|---|---|---|---|---|---|
| League One | Matchday 1 | | 46 | 13 | 9 | 24 | 35 | 67 | −32 | 28.26 |
| FA Cup | First round | Third round | 3 | 2 | 0 | 1 | 6 | 5 | +1 | 66.67 |
| EFL Cup | First round | First round | 1 | 0 | 0 | 1 | 1 | 2 | −1 | 0.00 |
| EFL Trophy | Group stage | Group stage | 3 | 1 | 1 | 1 | 3 | 5 | −2 | 33.33 |
| Total | | | 53 | 16 | 10 | 27 | 45 | 79 | −34 | 30.19 |

Last updated: 27 February 2024
Source: Soccerway

=== League One ===
==== League table ====
| Pos | Team | Pld | W | D | L | GF | GA | GD | Pts | Promotion, qualification or relegation |
|---|---|---|---|---|---|---|---|---|---|---|
| 16 | Charlton Athletic | 46 | 11 | 20 | 15 | 64 | 65 | −1 | 53 | |
| 17 | Reading | 46 | 16 | 11 | 19 | 68 | 70 | −2 | 53 (Note: On 16 August 2023, Reading were deducted one point for failing to pay players on time and in full on three occasions in the 2022–23 season. Another 3-point deduction was applied on 13 September, for failing to deposit wages on time. Another 2-point deduction was applied on 27 February, due to late HMRC payments.) | |
| 18 | Cambridge United | 46 | 12 | 12 | 22 | 39 | 61 | −22 | 48 | |
| 19 | Shrewsbury Town | 46 | 13 | 9 | 24 | 35 | 67 | −32 | 48 | |
| 20 | Burton Albion | 46 | 12 | 10 | 24 | 39 | 67 | −28 | 46 | |
| 21 | Cheltenham Town (R) | 46 | 12 | 8 | 26 | 41 | 65 | −24 | 44 | Relegation to EFL League Two |
| 22 | Fleetwood Town (R) | 46 | 10 | 13 | 23 | 49 | 72 | −23 | 43 | Relegation to EFL League Two |

Source: EFL Official Website
Rules for classification: 1) Points; 2) Goal difference; 3) Number of goals scored; 4) Head-to-head results; 5) Wins; 6) Away goals; 7) Penalty points (sec 9.5); 8) 12-point sending off offences
(R) Relegated

==== Results summary ====
| Overall | | | | | | | | Home | | | | | | Away | | | | | |
| Pld | W | D | L | GF | GA | GD | Pts | W | D | L | GF | GA | GD | W | D | L | GF | GA | GD |
|---|---|---|---|---|---|---|---|---|---|---|---|---|---|---|---|---|---|---|---|
| 46 | 13 | 9 | 24 | 35 | 67 | −32 | 48 | 8 | 3 | 12 | 17 | 31 | −14 | 5 | 6 | 12 | 18 | 36 | −18 |

Last updated: 27 February 2024.
Source: Soccerway

==== Results by round ====
| Round | 1 | 2 | 3 | 4 | 5 | 6 | 8 | 9 | 9 | 11 | 12 | 13 | 14 | 15 | 16 | 7^{1} | 17 | 18 | 19 | 20 | 21 | 22 | 23 | 24 | 25 | 26 | 28 | 29 | 30 | 31 | 32 | 33 | 34 | 35 | 27^{2} | 36 | 37 | 38 | 39 | 41 | 42 | 43 | 44 | 40 | 45 | 46 |
|---|---|---|---|---|---|---|---|---|---|---|---|---|---|---|---|---|---|---|---|---|---|---|---|---|---|---|---|---|---|---|---|---|---|---|---|---|---|---|---|---|---|---|---|---|---|---|
| Ground | H | A | H | H | A | A | H | A | H | A | H | A | H | A | A | H | H | A | H | A | A | H | H | A | A | H | H | A | A | H | A | H | H | A | A | H | A | H | H | H | A | A | H | A | A | H |
| Result | W | L | W | L | W | L | L | L | D | L | W | D | W | L | L | L | W | L | W | D | W | L | L | L | L | W | L | L | W | L | D | D | L | W | L | L | W | L | W | D | D | L | L | D | D | L |
| Position | 8 | 13 | 7 | 12 | 11 | 15 | 15 | 17 | 18 | 19 | 18 | 18 | 15 | 15 | 18 | 19 | 16 | 16 | 12 | 12 | 11 | 14 | 14 | 16 | 17 | 13 | 17 | 19 | 15 | 17 | 19 | 19 | 19 | 19 | 18 | 20 | 17 | 17 | 17 | 18 | 17 | 18 | 19 | 18 | 18 | 19 |

Updated to match(es) played on 12 March 2024. Source: Soccerway
A = Away; H = Home; W = Win; D = Draw; L = Loss; P = Postponed
Notes:
- ^{1} Matchday 7 (vs Bolton Wanderers) was postponed due to the international call-ups.
- ^{2} Matchday 27 (vs Lincoln City) was postponed due FA Cup involvement.

==== Matches ====
On 22 June, the EFL League One fixtures were released.

Win Draw Loss Fixtures

| 5 August 2023 1 | Shrewsbury Town | 1–0 | Cheltenham Town | Shrewsbury |
| 15:00 BST | Bowman (yellow card) 3' (goal) 50'; Anderson (yellow card) 13'; Kenneh (yellow card) 65' | Report | Thompson (yellow card) 45+3'; Hammond (yellow card) 87' | Stadium: New Meadow; Attendance: 6,599; Referee: Christopher Pollard |

| 12 August 2023 2 | Stevenage | 2–0 | Shrewsbury Town | Stevenage |
| 15:00 BST | Pressley 58'; Reid 87' | Report | Bayliss (yellow card) 45+5'; Winchester (yellow card) 74'; Kenneh (yellow card) 86' | Stadium: Broadhall Way; Attendance: 3,962; Referee: Craig Hicks |

| 15 August 2023 3 | Shrewsbury Town | 2–1 | Burton Albion | Shrewsbury |
| 19:45 BST | Bayliss 3'; Dunkley 45+4'; Benning (yellow card) 83' | Report | Blackman (yellow card) 4'; Brayford (yellow card) 72'; Oshilaja (yellow card) 76'; Chauke (yellow card) 79'; Bennett 90+7' | Stadium: New Meadow; Attendance: 5,477; Referee: Scott Oldham |

| 19 August 2023 4 | Shrewsbury Town | 0–1 | Lincoln City | Shrewsbury |
| 15:00 BST | Shipley (yellow card) 19'; Anderson (yellow card) 78' | Report | O'Connor (yellow card) 31'; Roughan (yellow card) 40'; Sørensen (yellow card) 49'; Hamilton 79'; Jensen (yellow card) 88' | Stadium: New Meadow; Attendance: 5,602; Referee: Ross Joyce |

| 26 August 2023 5 | Fleetwood Town | 0–1 | Shrewsbury Town | Fleetwood |
| 15:00 BST | Lynch (red card) 43'; Vela (yellow card) 75'; Earl (red card) 90+5' | Report | Dunkley (yellow card) 26'; Udoh 41'; Benning (yellow card) 47'; Feeney (yellow card) 71' | Stadium: Highbury Stadium; Attendance: 3,380; Referee: Ben Speedie |

| 2 September 2023 6 | Carlisle United | 2–0 | Shrewsbury Town | Carlisle |
| 15:00 BST | Bayliss 57' (o.g.); Guy (yellow card) 82'; Garner 90+6' (yellow card) 90+6' | Report | Bowman (yellow card) 45'; Feeney (yellow card) 62'; Winchester (yellow card) 75'; Anderson (yellow card) 90+1' | Stadium: Brunton Park; Attendance: 7,395; Referee: Ben Toner |

| 16 September 2023 8 | Shrewsbury Town | 0–2 | Bristol Rovers | Shrewsbury |
| 15:00 BST | Winchester (yellow card) 50'; Dunkley (yellow card) 69' | Report | Marquis (yellow card) 29' (goal) 73'; Evans (yellow card) 42'; Hunt (yellow card) 87'; Collins 90+1' | Stadium: New Meadow; Attendance: 6,070; Referee: Tom Reeves |

| 23 September 2023 9 | Leyton Orient | 1–0 | Shrewsbury Town | Leyton |
| 15:00 BST | Sotiriou 20'; Pratley (yellow card) 49'; Archibald (yellow card) 52'; Forde (yellow card) 72'; James (yellow card) 75' | Report | Flanagan (yellow card) 85' | Stadium: Brisbane Road; Attendance: 8,001; Referee: Lewis Smith |

| 30 September 2023 10 | Shrewsbury Town | 0–0 | Charlton Athletic | Shrewsbury |
| 15:00 BST | Dunkley (yellow card) 86' | Report | Thomas (yellow card) 51'; Isted (yellow card) 83'; Tedić (yellow card) 87'; Watson (yellow card) 90+7' | Stadium: New Meadow; Attendance: 5,619; Referee: Edward Duckworth |

| 3 October 2023 11 | Oxford United | 3–0 | Shrewsbury Town | Littlemore |
| 19:45 BST | Stevens 17'; Brown 59'; Leigh (yellow card) 71' (goal) 90+6'; Goodrham (yellow card) 80'; McEachran (yellow card) 88' | Report | Anderson (yellow card) 47' (yellow-red card) 58' | Stadium: Kassam Stadium; Attendance: 7,212; Referee: Charles Breakspear |

| 7 October 2023 12 | Shrewsbury Town | 1–0 | Northampton Town | Shrewsbury |
| 15:00 BST | Kenneh (yellow card) 4'; Udoh 90+1' | Report | Pinnock (yellow card) 20'; Appéré (yellow card) 37'; Brough (yellow card) 45+1'; Hoskins (penalty missed) 73' | Stadium: New Meadow; Attendance: 5,722; Referee: Carl Brook |

| 14 October 2023 13 | Cambridge United | 1–1 | Shrewsbury Town | Cambridge |
| 15:00 BST | Digby (yellow card) 38'; Gordon (yellow card) 51'; Morrison 69' | Report | Benning (yellow card) 44'; Perry 88' | Stadium: Abbey Stadium; Attendance: 6,252; Referee: Scott Tallis |

| 21 October 2023 14 | Shrewsbury Town | 1–0 | Derby County | Shrewsbury |
| 15:00 BST | Bayliss (penalty missed) 44'; Hourihane 56' (o.g.); Flanagan (yellow card) 86' | Report | Nelson (yellow card) 86'; Bradley (yellow card) 90+6' | Stadium: New Meadow; Attendance: 8,088; Referee: Martin Woods |

| 24 October 2023 15 | Barnsley | 3–0 | Shrewsbury Town | Barnsley |
| 19:45 BST | Styles (yellow card) 14', (goal) 23'; Kane 19' (pen.); Cole 75' | Report | Dunkley (yellow card) 4'; Flanagan (yellow card) 80' | Stadium: Oakwell; Attendance: 10,859; Referee: Simon Mather |

| 28 October 2023 16 | Wigan Athletic | 2–0 | Shrewsbury Town | Wigan |
| 15:00 BST | Humphrys 35'; Lang 66'; Stones (yellow card) 90+4' | Report | Dunkley (red card) 5'; Sraha (yellow card) 15' | Stadium: DW Stadium; Attendance: 9,389; Referee: Daniel Middleton |

| 7 November 2023 7 | Shrewsbury Town | 0–2 | Bolton Wanderers | Shrewsbury |
| 19:45 BST | | Report | Maghoma 65'; Morley 90+8' | Stadium: New Meadow; Attendance: 5,901; Referee: Sam Allison |
Note: Fixture was previously postponed due to international call-ups within the Bolton squad.

| 11 November 2023 17 | Shrewsbury Town | 3–2 | Reading | Shrewsbury |
| 15:00 GMT | Bayliss 33'; Dunkley 90+2'; Sraha 90+6' | Report | Smith 12'; Ballard 15' | Stadium: New Meadow; Attendance: 6,583; Referee: Marc Edwards |

| 18 November 2023 18 | Blackpool | 4–0 | Shrewsbury Town | Blackpool |
| 15:00 GMT | Rhodes 19' (pen.); Beesley 33', 82'; Joseph 74' | Report | Bennett (yellow card) 20' | Stadium: Bloomfield Road; Attendance: 10,502; Referee: Ben Speedie |

| 25 November 2023 19 | Shrewsbury Town | 2–1 | Port Vale | Shrewsbury |
| 15:00 GMT | Mata 28'; Winchester (yellow card) 43'; Perry (yellow card) 45+2'; Udoh 48'; Bennett (yellow card) 56'; Anderson (yellow card) 81' | Report | Ojo (yellow card) 45+6'; Garrity 57' | Stadium: New Meadow; Attendance: 7,429; Referee: Scott Tallis |

| 28 November 2023 20 | Exeter City | 0–0 | Shrewsbury Town | Exeter |
| 19:45 GMT | Sweeney (yellow card) 50'; Cole (yellow card) 69' | Report | Shipley (yellow card) 18' | Stadium: St James Park; Attendance: 5,288; Referee: Alan Young |

| 9 December 2023 21 | Wycombe Wanderers | 0–1 | Shrewsbury Town | High Wycombe |
| 15:00 GMT | | Report | Perry 41' | Stadium: Adams Park; Attendance: 3,937; Referee: Edward Duckworth |

| 16 December 2023 22 | Shrewsbury Town | 0–3 | Portsmouth | Shrewsbury |
| 15:00 GMT | | Report | Raggett (yellow card) 12'; Kamara 45+2', 84'; Pack 62'; Morrell (yellow card) 72' | Stadium: New Meadow; Attendance: 7,296; Referee: Lee Swabey |

| 23 December 2023 23 | Shrewsbury Town | 1–2 | Peterborough United | Shrewsbury |
| 15:00 GMT | Bowman (yellow card) 53'; Shipley 58' (yellow card) 76'; Benning (yellow card) 87' | Report | Mason-Clark (yellow card) 53'; Jones 64'; Kyprianou 77' | Stadium: New Meadow; Attendance: 6,093; Referee: Martin Coy |

| 26 December 2023 24 | Cheltenham Town | 2–0 | Shrewsbury Town | Cheltenham |
| 15:00 GMT | Street (yellow card) 9'; Lloyd 34', 85'; Thompson (yellow card) 36' | Report | Maroši (yellow card) 9'; Anderson (yellow card) 34'; Pierre (yellow card) 58'; Dunkley (yellow card) 65'; Sobowale (yellow card) 80' | Stadium: Whaddon Road; Attendance: 5,146; Referee: Paul Howard |

| 29 December 2023 25 | Burton Albion | 1–0 | Shrewsbury Town | Burton upon Trent |
| 19:45 GMT | Lubala 16'; Oshilaja (yellow card) 67'; Crocombe (yellow card) 84' | Report | Kenneh (yellow card) 83' | Stadium: Pirelli Stadium; Attendance: 3,102; Referee: Carl Brook |

| 1 January 2024 26 | Shrewsbury Town | 3–1 | Fleetwood Town | Shrewsbury |
| 15:00 GMT | Kenneh 9'; Dunkley 45+3'; Feeney (yellow card) 51'; Shipley 58'; Bennett (yellow card) 65'; Mata (yellow card) 86'; Perry (yellow card) 87' | Report | Rooney (yellow card) 31', (goal) 66'; Dolan (yellow card) 45+4' | Stadium: New Meadow; Attendance: 5,537; Referee: Jacob Miles |

| 13 January 2024 28 | Shrewsbury Town | 0–1 | Stevenage | Shrewsbury |
| 15:00 GMT | Kenneh (yellow card) 67' | Report | Vancooten (yellow card) 55'; Reid 84'; Forster-Caskey (yellow card) 90+1' | Stadium: New Meadow; Attendance: 5,259; Referee: Thomas Kirk |

| 20 January 2024 29 | Peterborough United | 2–1 | Shrewsbury Town | Peterborough |
| 15:00 GMT | Edwards (yellow card) 30'; Randall 51'; Knight 68'; Collins (yellow card) 78' | Report | Winchester (yellow card) 33'; Shipley 41' (yellow card) 65'; Dunkley (yellow card) 77' | Stadium: London Road Stadium; Referee: Matthew Corlett |

| 27 January 2024 30 | Northampton Town | 0–2 | Shrewsbury Town | Northampton |
| 15:00 GMT | | Report | Udoh 57' (yellow card) 58'; Bayliss (yellow card) 73'; Dunkley 75'; Feeney (yellow card) 90+3' | Stadium: Sixfields Stadium; Attendance: 7,186; Referee: Seb Stockbridge |

| 3 February 2024 31 | Shrewsbury Town | 1–2 | Cambridge United | Shrewsbury |
| 15:00 GMT | Udoh 12'; Bloxham (yellow card) 90+1' (yellow-red card) 90+4'; Pierre (yellow card) 90+8' | Report | Taylor 14', 46'; Thomas (yellow card) 87'; Bennett (yellow card) 90' | Stadium: New Meadow; Attendance: 6,795; Referee: Craig Hicks |

| 10 February 2024 32 | Derby County | 1–1 | Shrewsbury Town | Derby |
| 15:00 GMT | Bird 54'; Hourihane (yellow card) 67'; Adams (yellow card) 84' | Report | Winchester (yellow card) 36'; Pierre (yellow card) 82' (goal) 87'; Benning (yellow card) 84' | Stadium: Pride Park Stadium; Attendance: 27,240; Referee: James Bell |

| 13 February 2024 33 | Shrewsbury Town | 1–1 | Barnsley | Shrewsbury |
| 19:45 GMT | Cadden 7' (o.g.); Benning (yellow card) 49'; Maroši (yellow card) 67'; Perry (yellow card) 89' | Report | Phillips (yellow card) 58'; de Gevigney (yellow card) 61'; Kane 90+2' (pen.) | Stadium: New Meadow; Attendance: 5,500; Referee: Thomas Parsons |

| 17 February 2024 34 | Shrewsbury Town | 0–1 | Wigan Athletic | Shrewsbury |
| 15:00 GMT | Dunkley (yellow card) 50'; Maroši (yellow card) 58'; Pierre (yellow card) 62'; Bennett (yellow card) 77' | Report | Adeeko (yellow card) 49'; Kerr (yellow card) 51'; Smith 57'; Clare (yellow card) 63' | Stadium: New Meadow; Attendance: 7,206; Referee: Lee Swabey |

| 24 February 2024 35 | Reading | 2–3 | Shrewsbury Town | Reading |
| 15:00 GMT | Smith 9', (yellow card) 90'; Yiadom (yellow card) 19'; Ehibhatiomhan 36'; Wing (yellow card) 79'; Mola (yellow card) 90+1' | Report | Shipley 3', (yellow card) 74'; Bayliss 5'; Benning (yellow card) 32'; Bloxham 45+5'; Hinchy (yellow card) 49'; Bowman (yellow card) 59'; Kenneh (yellow card) 65' | Stadium: Madejski Stadium; Attendance: 12,904; Referee: Ollie Yates |

| 27 February 2024 27 | Lincoln City | 3–0 | Shrewsbury Town | Lincoln |
| 19:45 GMT | Bishop 6'; Hackett-Fairchild 58'; Sørensen 67' | Report | Bowman (yellow card) 23'; Bennett (yellow card) 42' | Stadium: Sincil Bank; Attendance: 6,842; Referee: Marc Edwards |
Note: Fixture was originally scheduled for 6 January, but was postponed due to FA Cup involvement.

| 2 March 2024 36 | Shrewsbury Town | 0–2 | Blackpool | Shrewsbury |
| 15:00 GMT | Udoh (yellow card) 45'; Hinchy (yellow card) 52' | Report | Byers (yellow card) 25'; Dembélé 43'; Coulson 84' | Stadium: The Croud Meadow; Attendance: 6,602; Referee: Declan Bourne |

| 9 March 2024 37 | Port Vale | 1–2 | Shrewsbury Town | Burslem |
| 15:00 GMT | Dipepa 69'; Jones (yellow card) 87'; Sang (yellow card) 90+2'; Ripley (yellow card) 90+4' | Report | Udoh 6'; Bloxham 53'; Perry (yellow card) 59'; Winchester (yellow card) 88' | Stadium: Vale Park; Attendance: 6,900; Referee: Ben Toner |

| 12 March 2024 38 | Shrewsbury Town | 0–3 | Exeter City | Shrewsbury |
| 19:45 GMT | Sraha (yellow card) 5'; Shipley (red card) 6'; Bayliss (yellow card) 41'; Benning (yellow card) 42' | Report | Harper (yellow card) 27'; Cole (yellow card) 29'; Aimson 33'; Harris 41'; Aitchison 45+5'; Eisa (yellow card) 90+3' | Stadium: New Meadow; Attendance: 4,960; Referee: David Rock |

| 16 March 2024 39 | Shrewsbury Town | 1–0 | Carlisle United | Shrewsbury |
| 15:00 GMT | Perry (yellow card) 7'; Udoh 40' | Report | Neal (yellow card) 4'; McGeouch (yellow card) 25' | Stadium: New Meadow; Attendance: 6,721; Referee: Simon Mather |

| 29 March 2024 41 | Shrewbury Town | 1–1 | Oxford United | Shrewsbury |
| 15:00 GMT | Winchester (yellow card) 67'; Price 82' (yellow card) 87'; Flanagan (yellow card) 87'; Maroši (yellow card) 90+2' | Report | Bodin 53' | Stadium: New Meadow; Attendance: 7,340; Referee: Sam Purkiss |

| 1 April 2024 42 | Bristol Rovers | 0–0 | Shrewsbury Town | Horfield |
| 15:00 GMT | Finley (yellow card) 7' | Report | Bayliss (yellow card) 15'; Dunkley (yellow card) 66'; Flanagan (yellow card) 89' | Stadium: Memorial Stadium; Attendance: 8,130; Referee: Elliot Bell |

| 6 April 2024 43 | Portsmouth | 3–1 | Shrewsbury Town | Portsmouth |
| 15:00 BST | Dunkley 3' (o.g.); Swanson (yellow card) 35'; Bishop 42' (pen.), 77'; Moxon (yellow card) 79' | Report | Shipley 29'; Benning (yellow card) 45+3'; Bennett (yellow card) 50'; Flanagan (yellow card) 89' | Stadium: Fratton Park; Attendance: 20,081; Referee: Charles Breakspear |

| 13 April 2024 44 | Shrewsbury Town | 0–2 | Wycombe Wanderers | Shrewsbury |
| 15:00 BST | Flanagan (red card) 67'; Winchester (yellow card) 70' | Report | Leahy 83'; Kone 90+1' | Stadium: New Meadow; Attendance: 6,206; Referee: Martin Woods |

| 16 April 2024 40 | Bolton Wanderers | 2–2 | Shrewsbury Town | Bolton |
| 19:45 BST | Jerome 40'; Maghoma 71' | Report | Udoh 21'; Maroši (yellow card) 40'; Shipley 43'; Bennett (yellow card) 85' | Stadium: Toughsheet Community Stadium; Attendance: 19,974; Referee: Scott Oldham |

| 20 April 2024 45 | Charlton Athletic | 1–1 | Shrewsbury Town | Charlton |
| 15:00 BST | Isted (yellow card) 33'; Dobson 46' | Report | Udoh 23' | Stadium: The Valley; Attendance: 15,187; Referee: Daniel Middleton |

| 27 April 2024 46 | Shrewsbury Town | 1–3 | Leyton Orient | Shrewsbury |
| 12:30 BST | Udoh 76' | Report | Adu-Adjei 8'; Galbraith 24'; Agyei 53' | Stadium: New Meadow; Attendance: 7,397; Referee: Adam Herczeg |

=== FA Cup ===
The Shrews were drawn at home to Colchester United in the first round, away to Notts County in the second round and at home to Wrexham in the third round.

Win Draw Loss Fixtures

| 4 November 2023 First round | Shrewsbury Town | 3–2 | Colchester United | Shrewsbury |
| 15:00 GMT | Shipley (yellow card) 11' (goal) 56'; Udoh 22'; Bayliss (yellow card) 24'; Winchester (yellow card) 71'; Hall 79' (o.g.); Thorpe (yellow card) 90+4' | Report | McGeehan 10'; Greenidge (yellow card) 28'; Dallison (yellow card) 63'; Mitchell 86'; Read (yellow card) 90+1' | Stadium: New Meadow; Referee: Scott Jackson |

| 1 December 2023 Second round | Notts County | 2–3 | Shrewsbury Town | Nottingham |
| 19:45 GMT | Brindley 38'; Bostock (yellow card) 72'; Sanderson 75' | Report | Bowman 1', 49', 56'; Dunkley (yellow card) 16'; Maroši (yellow card) 86' | Stadium: Meadow Lane; Attendance: 4,551; Referee: Martin Woods |

| 7 January 2024 Third round | Shrewsbury Town | 0–1 | Wrexham | Shrewsbury |
| 14:00 GMT | Bowman (yellow card) 57'; Anderson (yellow card) 60' | Report | McClean (yellow card) 57'; O'Connor 72'; Tozer (yellow card) 88' | Stadium: New Meadow; Attendance: 9,304; Referee: Andrew Kitchen |

=== EFL Cup ===
Shrewsbury were drawn away to Leeds United in the first round.

Win Draw Loss Fixtures

| 9 August 2023 First round | Leeds United | 2–1 | Shrewsbury Town | Leeds |
| 19:45 BST | Gelhardt 52'; Struijk 58' | Report | Benning (yellow card) 7'; Perry 28'; Winchester (yellow card) 50' | Stadium: Elland Road; Attendance: 35,129; Referee: Seb Stockbridge |

=== EFL Trophy ===
In the group stage, Shrewsbury Town were drawn into Southern Group A alongside Forest Green Rovers, Walsall and Brighton & Hove Albion U21.

| Pos | Div | Team | Pld | W | PW | PL | L | GF | GA | GD | Pts | Qualification |
|---|---|---|---|---|---|---|---|---|---|---|---|---|
| 1 | L2 | Forest Green Rovers | 3 | 1 | 1 | 1 | 0 | 4 | 1 | +3 | 6 | Advance to Round 2 |
| 2 | ACA | Brighton & Hove Albion U21 | 3 | 1 | 1 | 1 | 0 | 3 | 2 | +1 | 6 | Advance to Round 2 |
| 3 | L1 | Shrewsbury Town | 3 | 1 | 1 | 0 | 1 | 3 | 5 | −2 | 5 | |
| 4 | L2 | Walsall | 3 | 0 | 0 | 1 | 2 | 5 | 7 | −2 | 1 | |

Updated to match(es) played on 14 November 2023. Source: EFL.com

Win Draw Loss Fixtures

| 5 September 2023 Group stage | Forest Green Rovers | 3–0 | Shrewsbury Town | Nailsworth |
| 19:00 BST | Kadji 37'; Robson (yellow card) 45+2'; Omotoye 61'; Stevens 65'; McKenzie (yellow card) 84' | Report | Bowman (penalty missed) 86' | Stadium: The New Lawn; Referee: Farai Hallam |

| 19 September 2023 Group stage | Shrewsbury Town | 0–0 (4–1 p) | Brighton & Hove Albion U21 | Shrewsbury |
| 19:00 BST | Kenneh (yellow card) 81'; Flanagan (yellow card) 90' | Report | Chouchane (yellow card) 6'; Nilsson (yellow card) 63'; Kavanagh (yellow card) 90+4' | Stadium: New Meadow; Attendance: 1,027; Referee: Paul Howard |
| | Penalties |
| | Bayliss (penalty scored); Bowman (penalty scored); Bennett (penalty scored); Anderson (penalty scored) | | Barrington (penalty missed); O'Mahony (penalty missed); Boaitey (penalty scored) |

| 14 November 2023 Group stage | Shrewsbury Town | 3–2 | Walsall | Shrewsbury |
| 19:00 GMT | Udoh 32'; Benning 34'; Pierre (yellow card) 48'; Bowman 49'; Burgoyne (yellow card) 61'; Loughran (yellow card) 90+5' | Report | Johnson 6' (penalty missed) 61'; Knowles (yellow card) 33'; McEntee (yellow card) 48'; Griffiths (yellow card) 57'; Hutchinson 73'; James-Taylor (yellow card) 90' | Stadium: New Meadow; Attendance: 1,409; Referee: Ruebyn Ricardo |
