= Jordan Shipley (footballer) =

Irish footballer (born 1997)

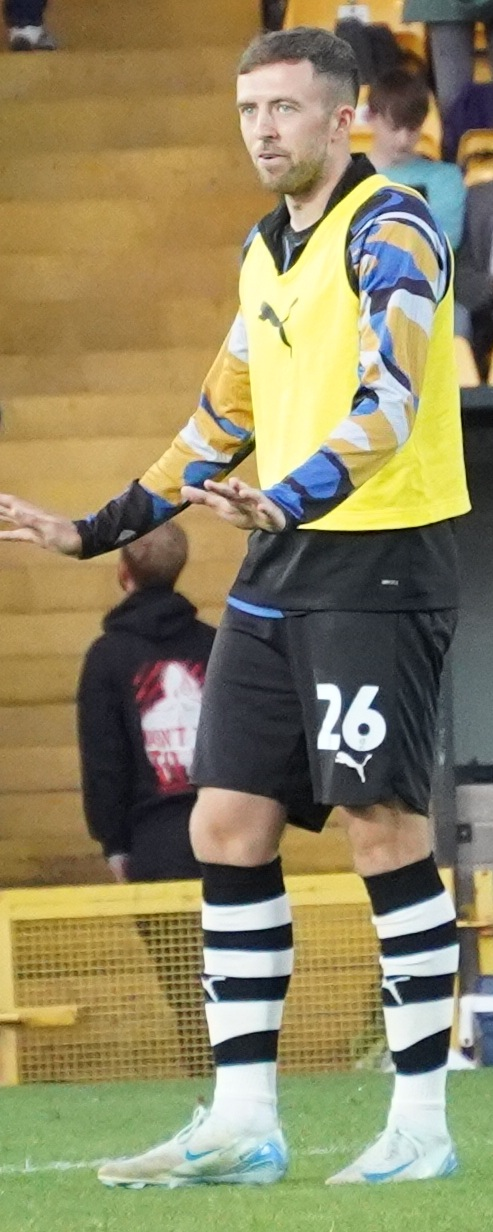
- Shipley whilst with Port Vale (2025)

Personal information
- Full name: Jordan Mark Edward James Shipley
- Date of birth: 26 September 1997 (age 29)
- Place of birth: Leamington Spa, England
- Height: 5 ft 11 in (1.80 m)
- Position: Midfielder

Team information
- Current team: Cheltenham Town
- Number: 26

Youth career
- 2005–2016: Coventry City

Senior career*
Years	Team	Apps	(Gls)
2016–2022	Coventry City	133	(16)
2022–2025	Shrewsbury Town	111	(12)
2025–2026	Port Vale	27	(0)
2026–	Cheltenham Town	16	(0)

International career
2018	Republic of Ireland U21	2	(0)
- * Club domestic league appearances and goals as of 16:23, 22 November 2026 (UTC)

Jordan Mark Edward James Shipley (born 26 September 1997) is a professional footballer who plays as a midfielder for EFL League Two club Cheltenham Town.

Shipley was born in England, but represented the Republic of Ireland at under-21 level. He began his club career at Coventry City, where he made his first-team debut in April 2017. He was promoted out of the League Two play-offs with the club in 2018, scoring a goal in the final. He then helped the team to win another promotion in the 2019–20 campaign, as Coventry won the League One title. He played 38 Championship games in two seasons before he was sold to League One club Shrewsbury Town in May 2022. He scored 16 goals in 135 games during three seasons with Shrewsbury. He played for Port Vale in the 2025–26 campaign and then joined Cheltenham Town in June 2026.

== Early and personal life ==
Jordan Mark Edward James Shipley was born on 26 September 1997 in Leamington Spa, Warwickshire. He attended Trinity Catholic School, where his PE teacher was Adam Willis. In March 2025, after being announced as a player advocate for the Her Game Too campaign, he revealed that he had two daughters.

== Club career ==
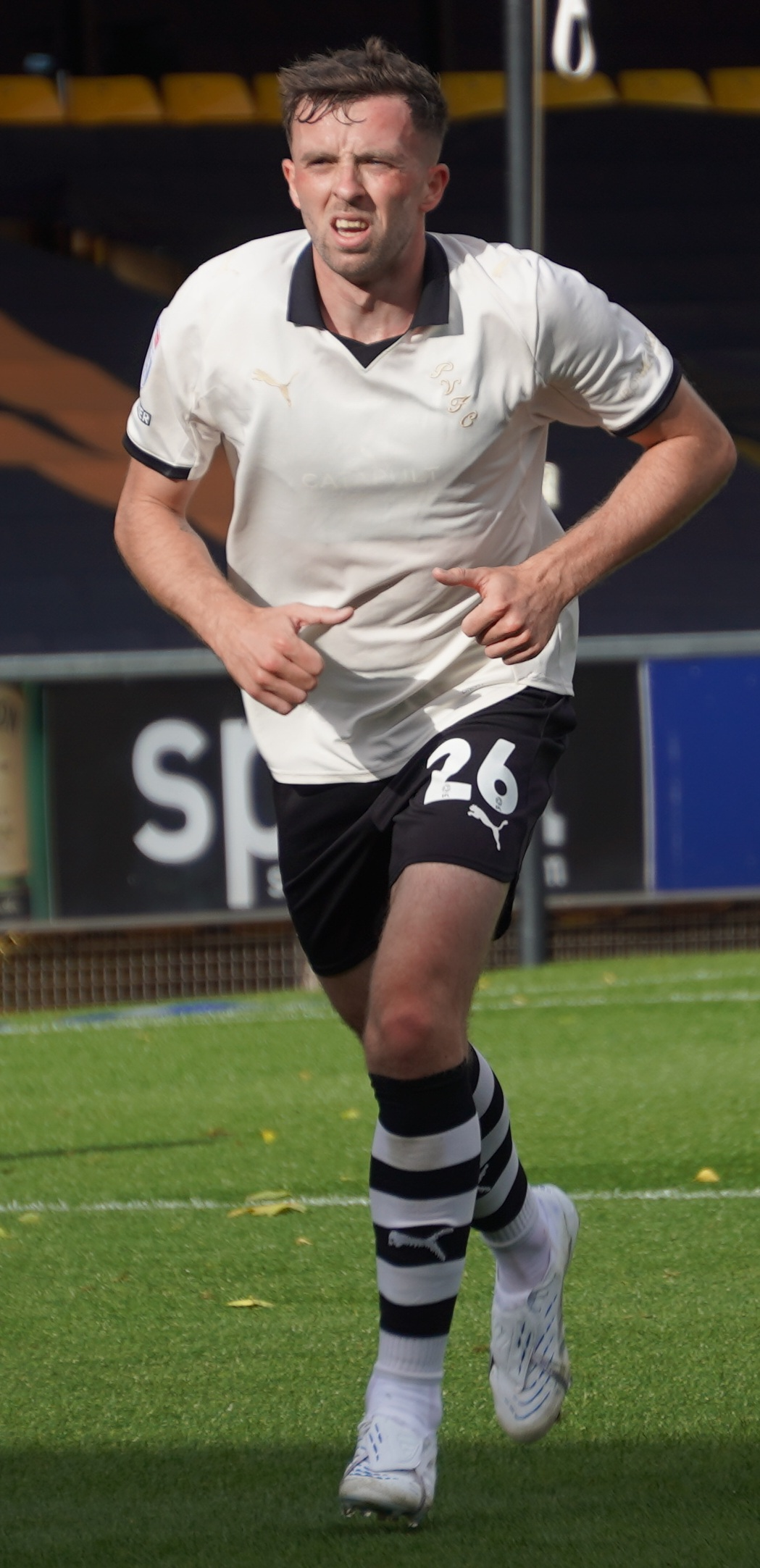
Shipley at Port Vale in October 2025.

=== Coventry City ===
Shipley joined the youth system at Coventry City at the age of seven and turned professional at the club in 2016. He made his senior debut on 22 April 2017, in a 1–0 win over Walsall at the Ricoh Arena, with relegation from League One already confirmed. He scored his first senior goal on 28 October 2017, winning the League Two Goal Of The Week award for his free-kick in a 3–0 victory at Luton Town. He signed a new two-and-a-half-year contract in January 2018 after playing his 13th consecutive game for the club. He played a "key role" in the 2017–18 campaign, scoring six goals in 41 games. This tally included Coventry's second goal in the 2018 League Two play-off final victory over Exeter City at Wembley Stadium. He claimed three goals in 36 matches throughout the 2018–19 season as the Sky Blues re-established themselves in League One.

In August 2019, Shipley extended his contract until 2021. He went on to score seven goals in 42 matches across the 2019–20 campaign as Coventry won promotion as League One champions. He agreed a new two-year contract in July 2020. He scored three goals in 27 Championship games in the 2020–21 campaign, ending with back-to-back goals against Huddersfield Town and Millwall. He was a loan transfer target for Portsmouth manager Danny Cowley in August 2021, though no move transpired. He began the 2021–22 campaign behind Liam Kelly, Gustavo Hamer, Ben Sheaf, Callum O'Hare and Jamie Allen in the pecking order, and did not feature in the league in the first half of the season. Manager Mark Robins admitted that Shipley was "frustrated" with his absence from matchday squads. He featured more heavily in the second half of the season, ending with 14 appearances. He scored one goal on 22 January, with a volley from just outside the penalty area in a 2–1 home defeat to Queens Park Rangers, which later earned him the club's Goal of the Season award. He scored 20 goals in 163 appearances throughout his time at Coventry. Upon his departure, Robins said Shipley was "a great role model for young players at the club for what they can achieve".

=== Shrewsbury Town ===
On 11 May 2022, Shipley joined League One side Shrewsbury Town for an undisclosed fee, signing a three-year deal after Coventry had activated their option to extend his contract. He was said to have been a "long-term target" of manager Steve Cotterill. He shifted Shipley to left wing-back after George Nurse suffered a long-term injury. He quickly amassed three goals playing in his new role, and targeted double figures for the season. He ended the 2022–23 season with five goals in 50 games.

He missed nine weeks early in the 2023–24 season after sustaining a knee injury. He scored the last goal of manager Matthew Taylor's reign, the consolation in a 2–1 defeat at Peterborough United on 20 January. Shipley scored a "sweet left-foot volley" in a 3–2 win at Reading on 24 February, earning himself a nomination for that month's Championship Goal of the Month. He also provided two assists during the game, ensuring himself a mention on the EFL Team of the Week. He was sent off in a 3–0 defeat to Exeter City at the New Meadow on 12 March, though manager Paul Hurst said the club would likely appeal the decision. He ended the season with seven goals in 37 matches.

On 5 October 2024, he scored at Bolton Wanderers from the edge of the box after being picked out directly from a corner kick, and was nominated for the October League One Goal of the Month award. He injured his Achilles tendon during the game, which left him sidelined for four weeks. He scored his final goal for the Shrews on 14 December, a consolation in a 4–1 home loss to manager Gareth Ainsworth's former club Wycombe Wanderers. He played 38 matches of the 2024–25 campaign, scoring four goals. On 7 May 2025, following the Shrewsbury's relegation in last place, the club confirmed that he would be released upon the expiry of his contract as manager Michael Appleton wished to move forward with a smaller squad.

=== Port Vale ===
On 14 June 2025, Shipley signed a two-year deal with League One club Port Vale, to begin after his free transfer was confirmed on 1 July. Shipley spoke out in December to say that the players had to accept responsibility for manager Darren Moore's sacking. He was subject to criticism for pulling out of a tackle in a 3–1 defeat to Exeter City on 24 January, though new manager Jon Brady defended him by saying Shipley had been playing through injury and also hinted at personal circumstances off the pitchg holding him back. Shipley was praised for his performance in the FA Cup fourth round victory over Bristol City, with Brady commenting that "on that night he has proved to his own crowd, who boo him, proved to them that he is fighting". He made 18 league starts in the 2025–26 season, which culminated in relegation. His contract was terminated by mutual consent on 23 June 2026.

=== Cheltenham Town ===
On 23 June 2026, Shipley signed with League Two club Cheltenham Town, managed by former Shrewsbury boss Steve Cotterill.

== International career ==
Born in England, he was called up by Noel King to represent the Republic of Ireland under-21 team in October 2018 for the upcoming 2019 UEFA European Under-21 Championship qualification games. He played the final two group games, a 3–1 defeat to Israel and 2–0 loss to Germany.

== Style of play ==
Shipley is a versatile left-footed midfielder. He is highly regarded for his passing, movement, and work rate, and he has a knack for scoring long-range goals when the ball breaks to him from set-piece situations.

== Career statistics ==
As of match played 21 November 2026

Appearances and goals by club, season and competition
Club	Season	League			FA Cup		EFL Cup		Other		Total	
Club	Season	Division	Apps	Goals	Apps	Goals	Apps	Goals	Apps	Goals	Apps	Goals
Coventry City	2016–17	League One	1	0	0	0	0	0	0	0	1	0
Coventry City	2017–18	League Two	30	4	5	1	1	0	5 (Note: Two appearances in EFL Trophy, three appearances and one goal in League Two play-offs)	1	41	6
Coventry City	2018–19	League One	33	3	1	0	1	0	1 (Note: Appearance(s) in EFL Trophy)	0	36	3
Coventry City	2019–20	League One	31	5	7	2	2	0	2	0	42	7
Coventry City	2020–21	Championship	27	3	1	0	1	0	—		29	3
Coventry City	2021–22	Championship	11	1	2	0	1	0	—		14	1
Coventry City	Total		133	16	16	3	6	0	8	1	163	20
Shrewsbury Town	2022–23	League One	45	4	3	1	2	0	0	0	50	5
Shrewsbury Town	2023–24	League One	33	6	3	1	1	0	0	0	37	7
Shrewsbury Town	2024–25	League One	33	2	1	0	2	2	2	0	38	4
Shrewsbury Town	Total		111	12	7	2	5	2	2	0	125	16
Port Vale	2025–26	League One	27	0	2	1	1	0	3	1	33	2
Cheltenham Town	2026–27	League Two	16	0	1	0	1	0	1	0	19	0
Career total			287	28	26	6	13	2	14	2	340	38

== Honours ==
Coventry City

- EFL League One: 2019–20
- EFL League Two play-offs: 2018
