= Taylor Perry =

English footballer

Personal information
- Full name: Taylor James Perry
- Date of birth: 15 July 2001 (age 25)
- Place of birth: Stourbridge, England
- Height: 5 ft 11 in (1.80 m)
- Position: Midfielder

Team information
- Current team: Exeter City
- Number: 8

Youth career
- 2008–2019: Wolverhampton Wanderers

Senior career*
Years	Team	Apps	(Gls)
2019–2023	Wolverhampton Wanderers	3	(0)
2021	→ Cheltenham Town (loan)	10	(1)
2022–2023	→ Cheltenham Town (loan)	34	(2)
2023–2026	Shrewsbury Town	63	(4)
2026–	Exeter City	0	(0)
- * Club domestic league appearances and goals as of 18:10, 17 July 2026 (UTC)

Taylor James Perry (born 15 July 2001) is an English footballer who plays as a midfielder for EFL League Two club Exeter City.

== Career ==
Born in Stourbridge, Perry made his first team debut for Wolverhampton Wanderers, whose academy he had progressed from, on 25 September 2019 as a substitute in an EFL Cup victory against Reading. He had been part of the club's pre-season tour of China, where he played in the Premier League Asia Trophy Final against Manchester City and scored in Wolves' penalty shootout victory.

On 5 August 2021 it was announced that Perry had signed a season-long loan at Cheltenham Town. In his sixth appearance for Cheltenham (fifth in League One), Perry scored his first senior professional goal, and his debut goal for Cheltenham, in a 2–1 away win against Charlton Athletic on 11 September 2021. Having suffered an injury in October 2021, he was recalled by Wolves for treatment in January 2022.

On 14 July 2022, Perry returned to Cheltenham Town for another season on loan.

At the end of the 2022–23 season, Perry departed Wolverhampton Wanderers.

On 24 July 2023, Shrewsbury Town announced the signing of Taylor Perry. After three seasons with Shrewsbury, Perry signed for Exeter City in July 2026.

== Career statistics ==
As of match played 4 December 2024

Appearances and goals by club, season and competition
Club	Season	League			FA Cup		League Cup		Other		Total	
Club	Season	Division	Apps	Goals	Apps	Goals	Apps	Goals	Apps	Goals	Apps	Goals
Wolverhampton Wanderers	2019–20	Premier League	0	0	0	0	2	0	1 (Note: Appearance in Europa League)	0	3	0
Wolverhampton Wanderers	2020–21	Premier League	0	0	0	0	0	0	0	0	0	0
Wolverhampton Wanderers	2021–22	Premier League	0	0	0	0	0	0	0	0	0	0
Wolverhampton Wanderers	2022–23	Premier League	0	0	0	0	0	0	0	0	0	0
Wolverhampton Wanderers	Total		0	0	0	0	2	0	1	0	3	0
Wolverhampton Wanderers U21s	2019–20 EFL Trophy		—		—		—		2 (Note: Appearance(s) in EFL Trophy)	0	2	0
Wolverhampton Wanderers U21s	2020–21 EFL Trophy		—		—		—		3	1	3	1
Wolverhampton Wanderers U21s	Total		—		—		—		5	1	5	1
Cheltenham Town (loan)	2021–22	League One	10	1	0	0	3	0	1	0	14	1
Cheltenham Town (loan)	2022–23	League One	34	2	0	0	0	0	4	0	38	2
Cheltenham Town (loan)	Total		44	3	0	0	3	0	5	0	52	3
Shrewsbury Town	2023–24	League One	42	2	2	0	1	1	2	0	47	3
Shrewsbury Town	2024–25	League One	12	0	0	0	1	0	2	0	15	0
Shrewsbury Town	Total		54	2	2	0	2	1	4	0	62	3
Career total			98	5	2	0	7	1	15	1	122	7
