= Charles Sagoe Jr =

English footballer (born 2004)

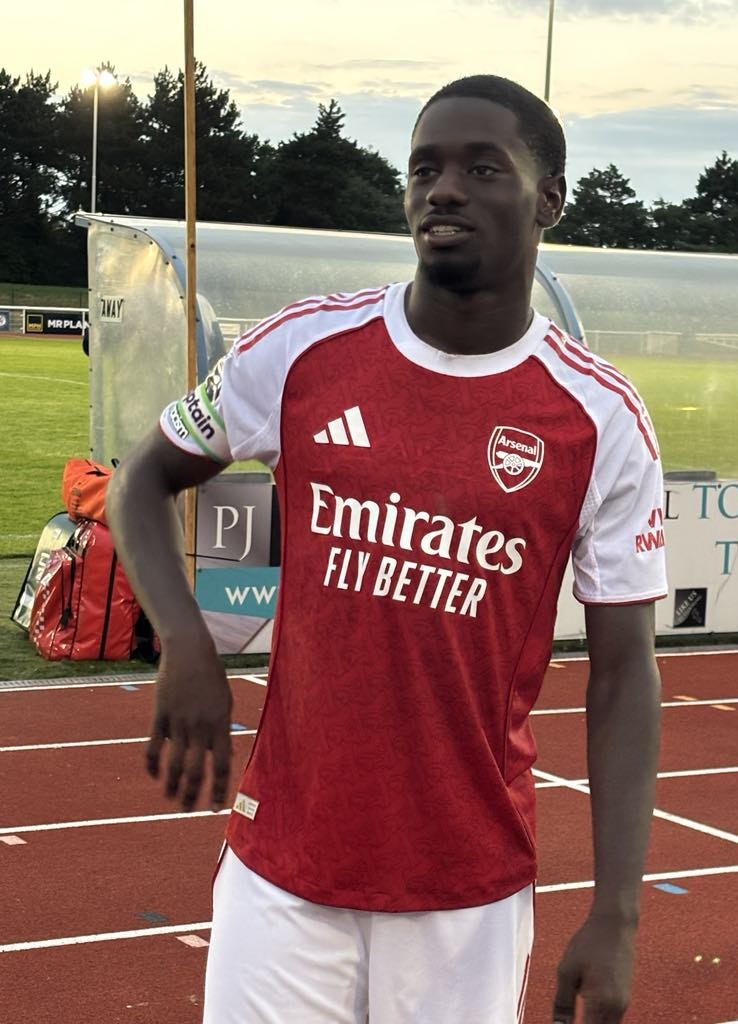
- Sagoe Jr in 2025

Personal information
- Full name: Charles Kwame Sagoe Junior
- Date of birth: 24 July 2004 (age 22)
- Place of birth: Kingston upon Thames, England
- Position: Left winger

Team information
- Current team: Kalmar (on loan from Arsenal)
- Number: 24

Youth career
- –2015: Fulham
- 2015–2023: Arsenal

Senior career*
Years	Team	Apps	(Gls)
2023–	Arsenal	0	(0)
2024	→ Swansea City (loan)	2	(0)
2024–2025	→ Shrewsbury Town (loan)	13	(0)
2026–	→ Kalmar (loan)	10	(1)
- * Club domestic league appearances and goals as of 11:22, 7 September 2026 (UTC)

Charles Kwame Sagoe Junior (/ˈseɪɡəʊ/ SAY-goh; born 24 July 2004) is an English professional footballer who plays as a left winger for Allsvenskan club Kalmar, on loan from Arsenal.

== Career ==
Sagoe Jr played for Arsenal since U12 level having previously played with Fulham. He progressed through the Arsenal academy and represented the club's under-21 side in the EFL Trophy during the 2021–22 season.

In September 2023, he was called up to the Arsenal first-team squad training ahead of their UEFA Champions League match against PSV Eindhoven. On 27 September 2023, he made his senior debut for Arsenal, starting in the EFL Cup against Brentford.

On 1 February 2024 he went out on loan to EFL Championship team Swansea City for the remainder of the 2023–24 season.

On 16 August 2024, Sagoe Jr joined League One side Shrewsbury Town on a season-long loan deal. He returned to his parent club on 6 January 2025.

On 10 February 2026, Sagoe Jr joined Allsvenskan side Kalmar on a season-long loan.

== Personal life ==
Sagoe Jr was born in England, and he is of Ghanaian and Liberian descent. As a result, he is eligible to represent England, Ghana and Liberia at international level.

In October 2025, Sagoe Jr declined a call up from Liberia, for whom he is eligible to play through his mother. In a press conference about Sagoe's invitation, Liberia's interim head coach Thomas Kojo stated that "I don't think the parents are ready for him to come to Liberia."

== Career statistics ==
As of match played 30 May 2026

Appearances and goals by club, season and competition
Club	Season	League			National cup (Note: Includes FA Cup & Svenska Cupen)		League cup (Note: Includes EFL Cup)		Europe		Other		Total	
Club	Season	Division	Apps	Goals	Apps	Goals	Apps	Goals	Apps	Goals	Apps	Goals	Apps	Goals
Arsenal U21	2021–22	—	—		—		—		—		1 (Note: Appearance(s) in EFL Trophy)	1	1	1
Arsenal U21	2022–23	—	—		—		—		—		4	0	4	0
Arsenal U21	2023–24	—	—		—		—		—		4	1	4	1
Arsenal U21	2024–25	—	—		—		—		—		0	0	0	0
Arsenal U21	2025–26	—	—		—		—		—		3	2	3	2
Arsenal U21	Total		—		—		—		—		12	4	12	4
Arsenal	2023–24	Premier League	0	0	0	0	1	0	0	0	0	0	1	0
Arsenal	2024–25	Premier League	0	0	0	0	0	0	0	0	—		0	0
Arsenal	2025–26	Premier League	0	0	0	0	0	0	0	0	—		0	0
Arsenal	Total		0	0	0	0	1	0	0	0	0	0	1	0
Swansea City (loan)	2023–24	Championship	2	0	—		—		—		—		2	0
Shrewsbury Town (loan)	2024–25	League One	13	0	1	0	1	0	—		3	0	18	0
Kalmar FF (loan)	2026	Allsvenskan	10	1	2	1	—		—		—		12	2
Career total			25	1	3	1	2	0	0	0	15	3	45	6
