= Harvey Watts =

English footballer

Personal information
- Date of birth: 17 June 2006 (age 20)
- Position: Forward

Team information
- Current team: Shrewsbury Town
- Number: 37

Senior career*
Years	Team	Apps	(Gls)
2022–	Shrewsbury Town	1	(0)
- * Club domestic league appearances and goals as of 15:28, 8 November 2023

Harvey Watts (born 17 June 2006) is an English footballer who plays as a forward for EFL League Two club Shrewsbury Town.

== Career ==
Ahead of the 2022–23 season, Watts joined the academy of League One club Shrewsbury Town. He made his first-team debut on 30 August 2022, starting in a 2–1 defeat to Wolverhampton Wanderers U21 in an EFL Trophy fixture at the New Meadow.

On 19 August 2023, Watts made his league debut, appearing as a late substitute in a 1–0 home defeat to Lincoln City.

== Career statistics ==
As of match played 19 August 2023

Appearances and goals by club, season and competition
Club	Season	League			FA Cup		League Cup		Other		Total	
Club	Season	Division	Apps	Goals	Apps	Goals	Apps	Goals	Apps	Goals	Apps	Goals
Shrewsbury Town	2022–23	League One	0	0	0	0	0	0	2 (Note: Appearance(s) in EFL Trophy)	0	2	0
Shrewsbury Town	2023–24	League One	1	0	0	0	1	0	0	0	2	0
Shrewsbury Town	Total		1	0	0	0	1	0	2	0	4	0
Career total			1	0	0	0	1	0	2	0	4	0
