= Nohan Kenneh =

Liberian footballer (born 2003)

Personal information
- Date of birth: 10 January 2003 (age 23)
- Place of birth: Zwedru, Liberia
- Height: 6 ft 2 in (1.88 m)
- Position: Midfielder

Team information
- Current team: Maccabi Akhi Nazareth

Youth career
- Bradford City
- York City
- 2014–2022: Leeds United

Senior career*
Years	Team	Apps	(Gls)
2022–2025	Hibernian	15	(1)
2023	→ Ross County (loan)	16	(0)
2023–2024	→ Shrewsbury Town (loan)	28	(1)
2025	→ Ross County (loan)	15	(0)
2025–2026	Tranmere Rovers	35	(0)
2026–	Maccabi Akhi Nazareth	5	(0)

International career^{‡}
2017–2018	England U15	3	(0)
2018–2019	England U16	9	(0)
2019–2020	England U17	9	(0)
2023–	Liberia	19	(0)
- * Club domestic league appearances and goals as of 09:02, 17 September 2026 (UTC) ‡ National team caps and goals as of 21:17, 29 September 2026 (UTC)

Nohan Kenneh (born 10 January 2003) is a Liberian professional footballer who plays as a midfielder for Maccabi Akhi Nazareth and the Liberia national team. He is a former England youth international.

== Early and personal life ==
Kenneh was born in Liberia, moving to the United Kingdom as a refugee at the age of six.

== Club career ==
After playing in the youth teams of Bradford City and York City, Kenneh spent eight years with Leeds United, and was an unused first-team substitute on a number of occasions. He received a yellow card for his celebrations as an unused substitute in a Premier League match against Wolverhampton Wanderers.

Kenneh signed for Scottish club Hibernian in May 2022 on a three-year contract, with effect from 1 July. On 9 July 2022, he debuted for Hibernian during a 5–0 win over Clyde. On 13 August 2022, he scored his first professional goal in Hibernian's 2–1 loss away at Livingston in the Scottish Premiership.

Kenneh was loaned to Ross County in January 2023, and to English club Shrewsbury Town in July 2023.

On 1 January 2025, Kenneh returned on loan to Ross County until the end of the season. He was released by Hibernian in May 2025, at the end of his contract.

In July 2025 he signed for Tranmere Rovers.

On 10 July 2026, Kenneh signed for Maccabi Akhi Nazareth.

== International career ==
Kenneh represented England at under-16 and under-17 youth international levels. He was called up by his native country Liberia in March 2023, and made his first full international appearance in a 2–2 draw with South Africa on 24 March.

== Style of play ==
Kenneh prefers to play as a holding midfielder, but he can also play as a central defender.

== Career statistics ==
=== Club ===
As of 17 September 2026

Appearances and goals by club, season and competition
Club	Season	League			National cup (Note: Includes Scottish Cup, FA Cup)		League cup (Note: Includes Scottish League Cup, EFL Cup)		Other		Total	
Club	Season	Division	Apps	Goals	Apps	Goals	Apps	Goals	Apps	Goals	Apps	Goals
Leeds United U21	2020–21	—			—		—		1 (Note: Appearances in the EFL Trophy)	0	1	0
Leeds United U21	2021–22	—			—		—		3	0	3	0
Hibernian	2022–23	Scottish Premiership	15	1	0	0	4	0	—		19	1
Hibernian	2023–24	Scottish Premiership	0	0	0	0	0	0	—		0	0
Hibernian	2024–25	Scottish Premiership	0	0	0	0	0	0	—		0	0
Hibernian	Total		15	1	0	0	4	0	0	0	19	1
Ross County (loan)	2022–23	Scottish Premiership	16	0	1	0	0	0	2 (Note: Appearances in Scottish Premiership play-offs)	0	19	0
Shrewsbury Town (loan)	2023–24	EFL League One	28	1	3	0	1	0	1	0	33	1
Ross County (loan)	2024–25	Scottish Premiership	15	0	1	0	0	0	2 (Note: Appearances in the relegation play-offs)	0	18	0
Tranmere Rovers	2025–26	EFL League Two	35	0	0	0	0	0	2	0	37	0
Maccabi Akhi Nazareth	2026–27	Liga Leumit	5	0	—		—		—		5	0
Career total			114	2	5	0	5	0	11	0	135	2

=== International ===
As of match played 29 September 2026

Appearances and goals by national team and year
National team	Year	Apps	Goals
Liberia	2023	7	0
Liberia	2024	7	0
Liberia	2025	3	0
Liberia	2026	4	0
Total		21	0
