= Elliot Thorpe =

Welsh footballer (born 2000)

Personal information
- Full name: Elliot Morgan Thorpe
- Date of birth: 9 November 2000 (age 26)
- Place of birth: Hinchingbrooke, England
- Height: 1.76 m (5 ft 9 in)
- Position: Midfielder

Team information
- Current team: Braintree Town
- Number: 39

Youth career
- Cambridge United
- 2013–2021: Tottenham Hotspur

Senior career*
Years	Team	Apps	(Gls)
2021–2024	Luton Town	3	(0)
2022–2023	→ Burton Albion (loan)	5	(0)
2023	→ Shrewsbury Town (loan)	0	(0)
2024	Wealdstone	10	(0)
2025	Solihull Moors	6	(1)
2025–	Braintree Town	34	(0)

International career
- Wales U16
2016	Wales U17	3	(1)
2017–2018	Wales U19	6	(0)
2022	Wales U21	3	(0)
- * Club domestic league appearances and goals as of 16:50, 1 November 2026 (UTC)

Elliot Morgan Thorpe (born 9 November 2000) is a professional footballer who plays as a wing-back and midfielder for National League South club Braintree Town. Born in England, he represents Wales at youth level.

== Club career ==
Born in Hinchingbrooke, Thorpe began his career with Cambridge United and Tottenham Hotspur.

He signed for Luton Town in September 2021. He initially played for Luton's development squad. He made his first-team debut on 5 February 2022, in the FA Cup.

On 1 September 2022 he moved on loan to Burton Albion. Thorpe was recalled by Luton in January 2023.

On 12 July 2023, Thorpe signed for League One club Shrewsbury Town on a season-long loan deal. The loan ended in December 2023 due to injury.

He was released by Luton at the end of the 2023–24 season.

On 14 September 2024, Thorpe joined National League side Wealdstone. He was released by the club on 31 December 2024.

In April 2025 he signed for National League club Solihull Moors.

In August 2025, he joined newly National League club Braintree Town.

== International career ==
Thorpe qualifies for Wales through his mother. He also has Malaysian roots through his grandmother.

He has represented Wales at youth levels, starting at under-16 team, and including the under-21 team.

== Career statistics ==
As of 31 August 2026

Appearances and goals by club, season and competition
Club	Season	League			FA Cup		League Cup		Other		Total	
Club	Season	Division	Apps	Goals	Apps	Goals	Apps	Goals	Apps	Goals	Apps	Goals
Tottenham Hotspur U21	2018–19	—			—		—		1 (Note: Appearance(s) in EFL Trophy)	0	1	0
Tottenham Hotspur U21	2019–20	—			—		—		0	0	0	0
Tottenham Hotspur U21	2020–21	—			—		—		0	0	0	0
Tottenham Hotspur U21	Total		—		—		—		1	0	1	0
Luton Town	2021–22	Championship	0	0	1	0	0	0	0	0	1	0
Luton Town	2022–23	Championship	3	0	1	0	1	0	0	0	5	0
Luton Town	2023–24	Premier League	0	0	0	0	0	0	—		0	0
Luton Town	Total		3	0	2	0	1	0	0	0	6	0
Burton Albion (loan)	2022–23	League One	5	0	0	0	0	0	2	0	8	0
Shrewsbury Town (loan)	2023–24	League One	0	0	1	0	0	0	1	0	2	0
Wealdstone	2024–25	National League	10	0	1	0	—		3 (Note: Two appearances and one goal in National League Cup; one appearance in FA Trophy)	1	14	1
Solihull Moors	2024–25	National League	6	1	0	0	—		0	0	6	1
Braintree Town	2025–26	National League	26	0	1	0	—		3 (Note: Appearances in National League Cup)	0	30	0
Braintree Town	2026–27	National League South	8	0	0	0	—		0	0	8	0
Braintree Town	Total		34	0	1	0	—		3	0	38	0
Career total			58	1	5	0	1	0	10	1	74	2
