= Jude Collins =

English footballer (born 2005)

Personal information
- Date of birth: 18 October 2005 (age 21)
- Position: Midfielder

Team information
- Current team: Racing Club Warwick
- Number: 11

Youth career
- Shrewsbury Town

Senior career*
Years	Team	Apps	(Gls)
2022–2024	Shrewsbury Town	0	(0)
2024-2024	Barwell		
2024-2024	Gresley Rovers		
2024-2026	Shepshed Dynamo		
2026-	Racing Club Warwick	15	(2)
- * Club domestic league appearances and goals as of 21:57, 14 November 2023 (UTC)

Jude Collins (born 18 October 2005) is an English professional footballer who plays as a midfielder for Racing Club Warwick.

== Career ==
Collins made his first-team debut for Shrewsbury Town on 30 August 2022, starting in a 2–1 defeat to Wolverhampton Wanderers U21 in an EFL Trophy fixture at the New Meadow.

After leaving Salop, Collins spent time at Barwell and Gresley Rovers before joining Shepshed Dynamo. At Shepshed, he won the 2025-26 Supporters' Player of the Year award.

In June 2026, Collins signed for Racing Club Warwick.

== Career statistics ==
As of match played 14 November 2023

Appearances and goals by club, season and competition
Club	Season	League			FA Cup		EFL Cup		Other		Total	
Club	Season	Division	Apps	Goals	Apps	Goals	Apps	Goals	Apps	Goals	Apps	Goals
Shrewsbury Town	2022–23	EFL League One	0	0	0	0	0	0	1 (Note: Appearance(s) in EFL Trophy)	0	1	0
Shrewsbury Town	2023–24	EFL League One	0	0	0	0	0	0	1	0	1	0
Shrewsbury Town	Total		0	0	0	0	0	0	2	0	2	0
Career total			0	0	0	0	0	0	2	0	2	0
