= George Nurse (footballer) =

English footballer (born 1999)

Personal information
- Full name: George Damien Nurse
- Date of birth: 30 April 1999 (age 27)
- Place of birth: Bristol, England
- Height: 1.81 m (5 ft 11 in)
- Position: Full back

Team information
- Current team: Cheltenham Town
- Number: 21

Youth career
- –2018: Bristol City

Senior career*
Years	Team	Apps	(Gls)
2018–2021	Bristol City	0	(0)
2018–2019	→ Weston-super-Mare (loan)	40	(2)
2019–2020	→ Newport County (loan)	17	(1)
2020–2021	→ Walsall (loan)	10	(1)
2021–2026	Shrewsbury Town	81	(0)
2025	→ Yeovil Town (loan)	3	(0)
2025–2026	→ Solihull Moors (loan)	3	(0)
2026–	Cheltenham Town	23	(0)
- * Club domestic league appearances and goals as of 23:04, 17 November 2026 (UTC)

George Damien Nurse (born 30 April 1999) is an English professional footballer who plays as a full back for EFL League Two club Cheltenham Town.

== Career ==
On 12 July 2019, Nurse joined League Two side Newport County on a season long loan. He made his debut for Newport on 13 August 2019 in the starting line up for the EFL Cup first round win against Gillingham. On 5 October 2019 Nurse scored his first goal for Newport, the 96th minute winning goal in the League Two 1–0 win against Carlisle United.

On 7 August 2020, Nurse signed for League Two side Walsall on loan until the end of the season.

On 28 July 2021, Nurse joined League One side Shrewsbury Town for an undisclosed fee, signing a two-year deal. On 24 September 2022, Nurse went off injured after an hour in a 2–1 victory over Burton Albion, the injury later revealed to be a ruptured anterior cruciate ligament. On 16 October 2025, Nurse joined National League side Yeovil Town on an initial one month loan deal. On 5 December 2025, he joined Solihull Moors on a one-month loan.

On 8 January 2026, Nurse left Shrewsbury by mutual consent before joining Cheltenham Town on a contract until the end of the season.

== Career statistics ==
As of match played 14 November 2026

Appearances and goals by club, season and competition
Club	Season	League			FA Cup		EFL Cup		Other		Total	
Club	Season	Division	Apps	Goals	Apps	Goals	Apps	Goals	Apps	Goals	Apps	Goals
Bristol City	2018–19	Championship	0	0	0	0	0	0	—		0	0
Bristol City	2019–20	Championship	0	0	0	0	0	0	—		0	0
Bristol City	2020–21	Championship	0	0	0	0	0	0	—		0	0
Bristol City	Total		0	0	0	0	0	0	—		0	0
Weston-super-Mare (loan)	2018–19	National League South	40	2	5	1	—		5 (Note: Two appearances and one goal in FA Trophy, three appearances and one goal in Somerset Premier Cup)	2	50	5
Newport County (loan)	2019–20	League Two	17	1	3	0	1	0	5 (Note: Appearance(s) in EFL Trophy)	0	26	1
Walsall (loan)	2020–21	League Two	10	1	0	0	1	0	2	0	13	1
Shrewsbury Town	2021–22	League One	45	0	3	0	2	0	3	0	53	0
Shrewsbury Town	2022–23	League One	10	0	0	0	2	0	1	0	13	0
Shrewsbury Town	2023–24	League One	0	0	0	0	0	0	0	0	0	0
Shrewsbury Town	2024–25	League One	22	0	0	0	1	0	2	0	25	0
Shrewsbury Town	2025–26	League Two	4	0	0	0	1	0	0	0	5	0
Shrewsbury Town	Total		81	0	3	0	6	0	6	0	96	0
Yeovil Town (loan)	2025–26	National League	3	0	—		—		0	0	3	0
Solihull Moors (loan)	2025–26	National League	3	0	—		—		1 (Note: Appearance in FA Trophy)	0	4	0
Cheltenham Town	2025–26	League Two	13	0	1	0	—		—		14	0
Cheltenham Town	2026–27	League Two	10	0	1	0	1	0	3	0	15	0
Cheltenham Town	Total		23	0	2	0	1	0	3	0	29	0
Career total			177	4	13	1	9	0	22	2	221	7
