= Jack Loughran =

English footballer (born 200?)

Personal information
- Date of birth: 9 November 2006 (age 19)
- Position: Midfielder

Team information
- Current team: Prescot Cables

Youth career
- Shrewsbury Town

Senior career*
Years	Team	Apps	(Gls)
2023–2026	Shrewsbury Town	1	(0)
2024–2025	→ Whitchurch Alport (loan)	36	(7)
2025	→ Shifnal Town (loan)		
2025–2026	→ Redditch United (loan)		
2026–	Prescot Cables	12	(4)
- * Club domestic league appearances and goals as of 08:54, 12 October 2026 (UTC)

Jack Loughran (born 9 November 2006) is an English professional footballer who plays as a midfielder for Prescot Cables.

== Career ==
Loughran made his first-team debut for Shrewsbury Town on 14 November 2023, coming on as a half-time substitute for Daniel Udoh, and assisting Ryan Bowman for the third goal in a 3–2 win over Walsall in an EFL Trophy fixture at the New Meadow.

Whilst at the club he spent a season on loan at Whitchurch Alport where he scored seven goals in 36 league appearances.

The following season he also had loan spells at Shifnal Town and Redditch United.

After being released by Shrewsbury at the end of the 2025–26 season he joined Prescot Cables.

== Career statistics ==
As of match played 29 December 2023

Appearances and goals by club, season and competition
Club	Season	League			FA Cup		EFL Cup		Other		Total	
Club	Season	Division	Apps	Goals	Apps	Goals	Apps	Goals	Apps	Goals	Apps	Goals
Shrewsbury Town	2023–24	EFL League One	1	0	1	0	0	0	1 (Note: Appearance in EFL Trophy)	0	3	0
Career total			1	0	1	0	0	0	1	0	3	0
