= Jason Sraha =

English footballer (born 2002)

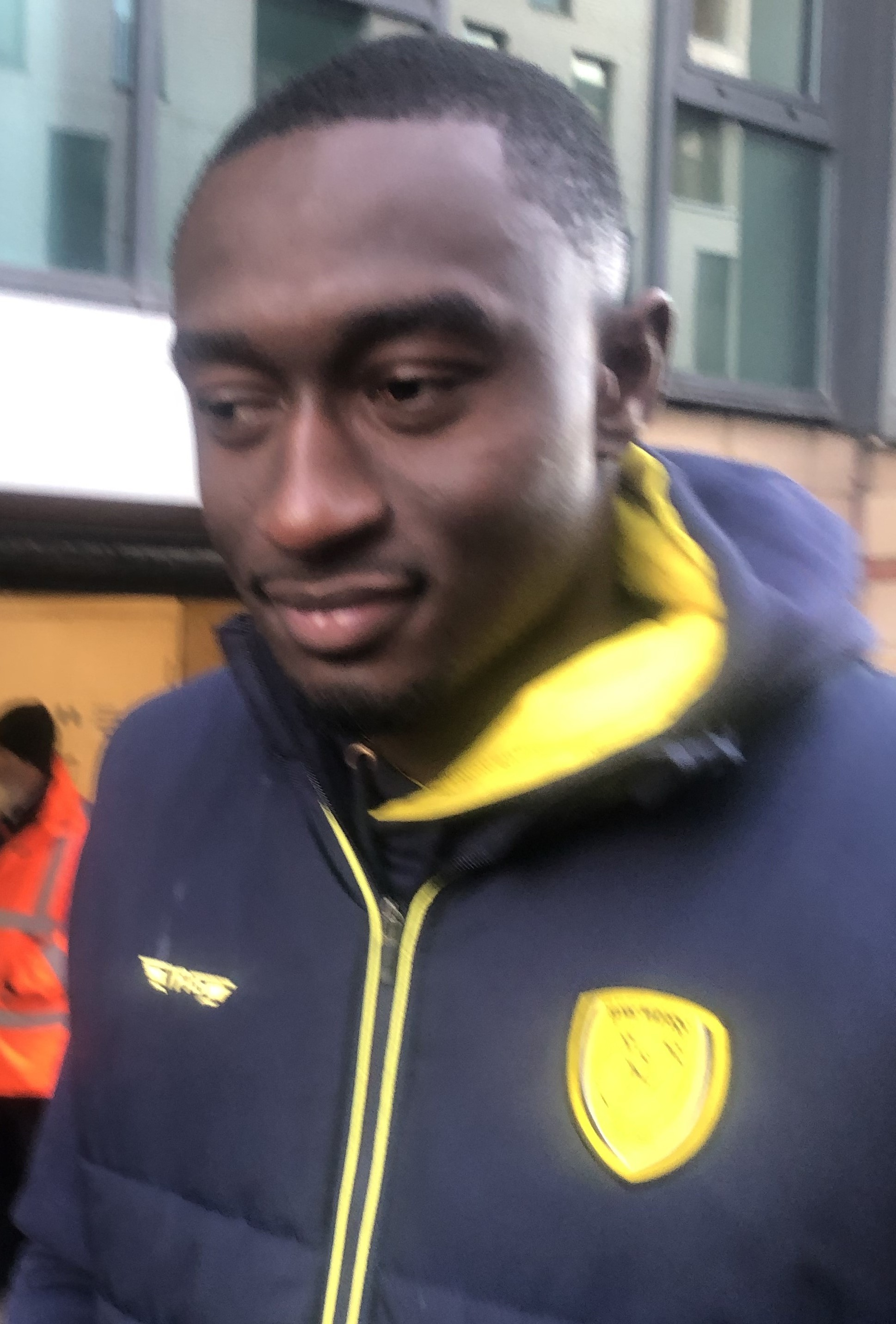
- Jason Sraha in 2024.

Personal information
- Full name: Jason Robert Sraha Osei
- Date of birth: 19 November 2002 (age 23)
- Place of birth: Lambeth, England
- Height: 6 ft 2 in (1.89 m)
- Position: Centre-back

Team information
- Current team: Burton Albion
- Number: 20

Youth career
- Chelsea
- 2019–2021: Arsenal

Senior career*
Years	Team	Apps	(Gls)
2021–2023	Barnsley	2	(0)
2022	→ Guiseley (loan)	13	(0)
2023–2024	Shrewsbury Town	17	(1)
2024–	Burton Albion	17	(0)
- * Club domestic league appearances and goals as of 04:03, 19 October 2024 (UTC)

Jason Robert Sraha Osei (born 19 November 2002) is an English professional footballer who plays as a centre-back for EFL League One club Burton Albion.

== Club career ==
Sraha is a product of the youth academy of Chelsea, and moved to Arsenal's academy on 8 July 2019. On 29 June 2021, Sraha signed with Barnsley after being released by Arsenal. He joined Guiseley on loan in the National League North in February 2022. He returned to Barnsley, and made his professional debut with them as a starter in a 3–1 EFL Championship loss to Preston North End on 30 April 2022. He was released by Barnsley in summer 2023.

On 14 July 2023, Sraha joined EFL League One club Shrewsbury Town on a one-year deal, with an option for a further year.

On 14 June 2024, Sraha completed signed for fellow League One club Burton Albion for an undisclosed fee.

== Personal life ==
Born in England, Sraha is of Nigerian and Ghanaian descent.

== Career statistics ==
As of match played 2 July 2024

Appearances and goals by club, season and competition
Club	Season	League			FA Cup		League Cup		Other		Total	
Club	Season	Division	Apps	Goals	Apps	Goals	Apps	Goals	Apps	Goals	Apps	Goals
Barnsley	2021–22	Championship	2	0	0	0	0	0	0	0	2	0
Barnsley	2022–23	League One	0	0	0	0	0	0	0	0	0	0
Barnsley	Total		2	0	0	0	0	0	0	0	2	0
Guiseley (loan)	2021–22	National League North	13	0	0	0	0	0	–		13	0
Shrewsbury Town	2023–24	League One	17	1	1	0	1	0	1	0	20	1
Burton Albion	2024–25	League One	0	0	0	0	0	0	0	0	0	0
Career total			32	1	1	0	1	0	1	0	35	1
