= Josh Bailey (footballer) =

English footballer

Personal information
- Full name: Joshua Roy Bailey
- Date of birth: 12 June 2002 (age 24)
- Place of birth: Telford, England
- Position: Left-back

Team information
- Current team: Tamworth
- Number: 35

Youth career
- Shrewsbury Town

Senior career*
Years	Team	Apps	(Gls)
2022–2024	Shrewsbury Town	1	(0)
2025–2026	Worcester City	34	(0)
2026–	Tamworth	0	(0)
- * Club domestic league appearances and goals as of 20:00, 9 September 2026 (UTC)

Joshua Roy Bailey (born 12 June 2002) is an English footballer who currently plays as a left-back for National League club Tamworth.

== Career ==
=== Shrewsbury Town ===
Bailey made his senior debut for Shrewsbury Town on 20 September 2022, he played the full match in a 4–0 defeat at home to Port Vale in the EFL Trophy. Josh appeared in the next EFL Trophy match for Shrewsbury Town on 18 October 2022, again playing the full match, in a 1–0 away defeat to Stockport County.

Bailey made his league debut for the club in a League One home fixture against Barnsley on 12 November 2022, coming on as a 81st minute substitute for Matthew Pennington in a 1–0 defeat. Bailey was confirmed as being released by the club on 27 April 2024.

=== Worcester City ===
Following a year without a club, Bailey signed for newly promoted Southern League Premier Division Central club Worcester City on 30 August 2025.

Josh made his Southern League Premier Division Central debut for Worcester City on 20 September 2025 in a home fixture against Real Bedford, his new side lost the match 3–1, with Josh playing 72 minutes before being replaced by Shay Palmer. Bailey went on to make 34 appearances for the club during the 2025–26 season, as the club reordered a 9th place finish in their first season in the division.

After his 2026/2027 season, Josh obtained the Players Player of the Season, Supporters Player of the Season and Young Player of the Season awards, however it was confirmed on 8 June 2026, that Bailey had departed the club after one season.

=== Tamworth ===
On 24 June 2026, Bailey signed for National League side Tamworth. Bailey made his debut for Tamworth on 9 September 2026, in a National League Cup fixture at home to Middlesbrough. coming on as a 81st minute substitute for Tom Parkes, Tamworth lost the fixture 3–1.

== Career statistics ==
As of match played 9 September 2026

Appearances and goals by club, season and competition
Club	Season	League			FA Cup		EFL Cup		Other		Total	
Club	Season	Division	Apps	Goals	Apps	Goals	Apps	Goals	Apps	Goals	Apps	Goals
Shrewsbury Town	2022–23	League One	1	0	0	0	0	0	2 (Note: Appearances in EFL Trophy)	0	3	0
Shrewsbury Town	2023–24	League One	0	0	0	0	0	0	0	0	0	0
Shrewsbury Town	Total		1	0	0	0	0	0	2	0	3	0
Worcester City	2025–26	Southern League Premier Division Central	34	0	0	0	—		1 (Note: Appearance in FA Trophy)	0	35	0
Tamworth	2026–27	National League	0	0	0	0	—		1 (Note: One appearance in National League Cup)	0	1	0
Career total			35	0	0	0	0	0	4	0	39	0
