= Nana Owusu-Gyimah =

English footballer (born 2004)

Personal information
- Full name: Nana Jr Owusu-Gyimah
- Date of birth: 12 October 2004 (age 22)
- Position: Defender

Team information
- Current team: Sporting Khalsa

Youth career
- Shrewsbury Town

Senior career*
Years	Team	Apps	(Gls)
2022–2024	Shrewsbury Town	0	(0)
2025–	Sporting Khalsa	0	(0)
- * Club domestic league appearances and goals as of 17:05, 16 January 2025 (UTC)

Nana Jr Owusu-Gyimah is an English professional footballer who most plays as a defender for Midland League Premier Division club Sporting Khalsa.

== Career ==
Owusu-Gyima made his senior debut for Shrewsbury Town on 30 August 2022, in a 2–1 defeat to Wolverhampton Wanderers U21 at the New Meadow. He was released by the club in April 2024.

In January 2025, he joined Northern Premier League Division One Midlands club Sporting Khalsa.

== Career statistics ==
As of end of 2023–24 season

Appearances and goals by club, season and competition
Club	Season	League			FA Cup		EFL Cup		Other		Total	
Club	Season	Division	Apps	Goals	Apps	Goals	Apps	Goals	Apps	Goals	Apps	Goals
Shrewsbury Town	2022–23	League One	0	0	0	0	0	0	3 (Note: Appearance(s) in the EFL Trophy)	0	3	0
Shrewsbury Town	2023–24	League One	0	0	0	0	0	0	1	0	1	0
Career total			0	0	0	0	0	0	4	0	4	0
