= Josh Barlow (footballer) =

English footballer (born 2004)

Personal information
- Full name: Joshua Daniel Barlow
- Date of birth: 19 January 2004 (age 22)
- Height: 6 ft 1 in (1.85 m)
- Position: Midfielder

Team information
- Current team: Evesham United FC

Youth career
- Cheltenham Town
- Shrewsbury Town

Senior career*
Years	Team	Apps	(Gls)
2022–2023	Shrewsbury Town	1	(0)
2023	Banbury United	10	(0)
2023–2024	Longlevens	8	(0)
- * Club domestic league appearances and goals as of 18:00, 7 March 2024 (UTC)

Joshua Daniel Barlow (born 19 January 2004) is an English professional footballer who last played as a midfielder for Longlevens.

== Career ==
Barlow made his professional debut at Shrewsbury Town in May 2022, having previously captained the academy side after joining from Cheltenham Town. He made his senior debut for the club on 30 August 2022, in a 2–1 defeat to Wolverhampton Wanderers U21 at the New Meadow.

In June 2023, Barlow signed for National League North side Banbury United. Following ten league appearances for Banbury, Barlow signed for Hellenic League club Longlevens.

== Style of play ==
Barlow is a central midfielder who is comfortable in possession, has a good passing range, and a powerful shot.

== Career statistics ==
As of match played 20 September 2022

Appearances and goals by club, season and competition
Club	Season	League			FA Cup		EFL Cup		Other		Total	
Club	Season	Division	Apps	Goals	Apps	Goals	Apps	Goals	Apps	Goals	Apps	Goals
Shrewsbury Town	2022–23	EFL League One	1	0	0	0	0	0	3	0	4	0
Career total			1	0	0	0	0	0	3	0	4	0
