= 2020–21 Swindon Town F.C. season =

Swindon Town
2020–21 season
- Chairman: Lee Power
- Manager: Richie Wellens (until 4 November); Noel Hunt (caretaker) (From 4 November to 12 November); John Sheridan (from 13 November to 18 April); Tommy Wright (caretaker) (From 18 April to 26 May) John McGreal (from 26 May to 25 June)
- Stadium: County Ground
- League One: 23rd (relegated)
- FA Cup: First round (eliminated by Darlington)
- EFL Cup: First round (eliminated by Charlton Athletic)
- EFL Trophy: Group stage
- Top goalscorer: League: Brett Pitman (11); All: Brett Pitman (12)
Home colours	Away colours

The 2020–21 season is Swindon Town's 142nd season in their history and their first season back in League One after being promoted as League Two champions following the 2019–20 season. Along with League One, the club also participates in the FA Cup, EFL Trophy and the EFL Cup.

The season covers the period from 1 July 2020 through to 30 June 2021.

== Transfers ==
=== Transfers in ===
Date	Position	Nationality	Name	From	Fee	Ref.
27 July 2020	CAM	(England)	Diallang Jaiyesimi	(England) Norwich City	Free transfer	
6 August 2020	CAM	(England)	Jack Payne	(England) Lincoln City	Free transfer	
15 August 2020	CB	(England)	Akin Odimayo	(England) Reading	Free transfer	
4 September 2020	ST	(Jersey)	Brett Pitman	(England) Portsmouth	Free transfer	
10 September 2020	GK	(England)	Joe Fryer	(England) Middlesbrough	Free transfer	
17 September 2020	LB	(England)	Jonathan Grounds	(England) Birmingham City	Free transfer	
18 September 2020	LW	(Jamaica)	Joel Grant	(England) Plymouth Argyle	Free transfer	
25 September 2020	LB	(Wales)	Dion Donohue	Unattached	Free transfer	
7 January 2021	RB	(Wales)	Kieron Freeman	Unattached	Free transfer	
1 February 2021	CDM	(Republic of the Congo)	Christopher Missilou	(England) Northampton Town	Undisclosed	
12 March 2021	GK	(Northern Ireland)	Lee Camp	Unattached	Free transfer	

=== Loans in ===
Date	Position	Nationality	Name	From	Fee	Ref.
6 August 2020	ST	(England)	Tyler Smith	(England) Sheffield United	End of season	
15 August 2020	CM	(England)	Matt Smith	(England) Arsenal	1 February 2021	
28 August 2020	GK	(Czech Republic)	Matěj Kovář	(England) Manchester United	6 January 2021	
29 August 2020	RW	(England)	Jonny Smith	(England) Bristol City	29 January 2021	
21 September 2020	RW	(England)	Jordan Stevens	(England) Leeds United	8 January 2021	
4 January 2021	LB	(England)	Dominic Thompson	(England) Brentford	End of season	
6 January 2021	GK	(Republic of Ireland)	Mark Travers	(England) AFC Bournemouth	11 February 2021	
19 January 2021	CB	(Republic of Ireland)	Conor Masterson	(England) Queens Park Rangers	End of season	
25 January 2021	ST	(Belgium)	Tyrese Omotoye	(England) Norwich City	End of season	
2 February 2021	RW	(Jamaica)	Jordon Garrick	(Wales) Swansea City	End of season	
12 February 2021	GK	(England)	Joe Wollacott	(England) Bristol City	27 February 2021	
1 March 2021	GK	(England)	Connal Trueman	(England) Birmingham City	7 March 2021	

=== Loans out ===
Date	Position	Nationality	Name	To	Fee	Ref.
3 September 2020	ST	(England)	Scott Twine	(Wales) Newport County	5 January 2021	
2 October 2020	CM	(England)	Luke Haines	(England) Hereford	31 October 2020	
16 October 2020	CM	(England)	Matt Palmer	(England) Wigan Athletic	4 January 2021	
8 December 2020	GK	(England)	Archie Matthews	(England) Melksham Town	January 2021	
26 December 2020	CM	(England)	Luke Haines	(England) Hereford	February 2021	

=== Transfers out ===
Date	Position	Nationality	Name	To	Fee	Ref.
1 July 2020	CAM	(England)	Keshi Anderson	(England) Blackpool	Free transfer	
1 July 2020	ST	(England)	Jacob Bancroft	(England) Oxford City	Released	
1 July 2020	CM	(England)	Ralph Graham	(England) Hungerford Town	Released	
1 July 2020	GK	(England)	Will Henry	(England) Bath City	Released	
1 July 2020	CB	(England)	Joe Romanski	(Poland) Zagłębie Lubin	Released	
10 July 2020	ST	(Republic of Ireland)	Eoin Doyle	(England) Bolton Wanderers	Free transfer	
28 July 2020	GK	(England)	Luke McCormick	(England) Plymouth Argyle	Free transfer	
31 August 2020	CM	(England)	Danny Rose	(England) Grimsby Town	Free transfer	
12 September 2020	CM	(Wales)	Michael Doughty	Unattached	Personal Reasons	
14 September 2020	LW	(England)	Kaiyne Woolery	(England) Tranmere Rovers	Free transfer	
26 September 2020	RW	(Wales)	Lloyd Isgrove	(England) Bolton Wanderers	Free transfer	
2 October 2020	RB	(England)	Tyler Reid	(England) Woking	Mutual Consent	
9 October 2020	CM	(Australia)	Cameron McGilp	(England) Slough Town	Mutual consent	
11 December 2020	LB	(Wales)	Dion Donohue	(England) Barrow	Personal Reasons	
7 January 2021	GK	(England)	Joe Fryer	Unattached	Released	
7 January 2021	CM	(England)	Toby Holland	Unattached	Released	
1 February 2021	CAM	(England)	Diallang Jaiyesimi	(England) Charlton Athletic	Undisclosed	
2 February 2021	RB	(Wales)	Kieron Freeman	(Wales) Swansea City	Undisclosed	

== Pre-season ==
Win Draw Loss

8 August 2020 Friendly	Nuneaton Borough	0–8	Swindon Town	Nuneaton
13:00 BST			Jaiyesimi 6', 13'; T.Smith 8', 17', 20', 45'; Reeves (Trialist) 40'; Williams (Trialist) 63'	Stadium: Liberty Way; Attendance: Behind closed doors
Note: Match behind closed doors due to COVID-19

11 August 2020 Friendly	Swindon Town	3–1	Bristol Rovers U23	Swindon
18:30 BST	Payne 16'; Twine 46'; Waite (Trialist) 60'		(Trialist) 60'	Stadium: County Ground; Attendance: Behind closed doors
Note: Match behind closed doors due to COVID-19

15 August 2020 Friendly	Swindon Town	2–1	Coventry City	Swindon
15:00 BST	T.Smith 22'; Twine 52'		Godden 87' (pen.)	Stadium: County Ground; Attendance: Behind closed doors
Note: Match behind closed doors due to COVID-19

18 August 2020 Friendly	Manchester United U23	0–2	Swindon Town	Greater Manchester
18:00 BST			Payne; Twine ((pen))	Stadium: Carrington; Attendance: Behind closed doors
Note: Match behind closed doors due to COVID-19

20 August 2020 Friendly	Abbey Hey	0–5	Swindon Town	Gorton, Manchester
19:00 BST			Ireland (Trialist); Hope; Nichols (Trialist)	Stadium: Abbey Stadium, Abbey Hey; Attendance: Behind closed doors
Note: Match behind closed doors due to COVID-19

22 August 2020 Friendly	Ashton United	4–3	Swindon Town	Greater Manchester
13:00 BST	Almond 10'; Wilson 22' (pen.); Pritchard 30'; Tomsett 37'		T.Smith 43'; Hope 62', 90+3'	Stadium: Hurst Cross, Ashton-under-Lyne; Attendance: ?
Note: Match Limited to 300 Capacity due to COVID-19

25 August 2020 Friendly	Melksham Town	1–1	Swindon Town	Melksham
19:45 BST	Ballinger 19'		Twine 69'	Stadium: Oakfield Stadium, Melksham; Attendance: ?
Note: Match Limited to 300 Capacity due to COVID-19

29 August 2020 Friendly	Bristol City	1–1	Swindon Town	Bristol
12:00 BST	Weimann 22'		Payne 62'	Stadium: Ashton Gate; Attendance: Behind closed doors
Note: Match behind closed doors due to COVID-19

29 August 2020 Friendly	Swindon Town	2–1	Brentford B	Swindon
15:00 BST	Hope; Twine		Adams	Stadium: County Ground; Attendance: Behind closed doors
Note: Match behind closed doors due to COVID-19

== Competitions ==
=== EFL League One ===
==== League table ====
Pos	Team	Pld	W	D	L	GF	GA	GD	Pts	Promotion, qualification or relegation
17	Shrewsbury Town	46	13	15	18	50	57	−7	54	
18	Plymouth Argyle	46	14	11	21	53	80	−27	53	
19	AFC Wimbledon	46	12	15	19	54	70	−16	51	
20	Wigan Athletic	46	13	9	24	54	77	−23	48	
21	Rochdale (R)	46	11	14	21	61	78	−17	47	Relegation to EFL League Two
22	Northampton Town (R)	46	11	12	23	41	67	−26	45	Relegation to EFL League Two
23	Swindon Town (R)	46	13	4	29	55	89	−34	43	Relegation to EFL League Two
24	Bristol Rovers (R)	46	10	8	28	40	70	−30	38	Relegation to EFL League Two

Source: EFL Official Website
Rules for classification: 1) Points; 2) Goal difference; 3) Number of goals scored; 4) Head-to-head results; 5) Wins; 6) Away goals; 7) Penalty points (sec 9.5); 8) 12-point sending off offences
(R) Relegated

==== Results summary ====
Overall								Home						Away					
Pld	W	D	L	GF	GA	GD	Pts	W	D	L	GF	GA	GD	W	D	L	GF	GA	GD
46	13	4	29	55	89	−34	43	8	1	14	25	38	−13	5	3	15	30	51	−21

Last updated: 5 April 2021.
Source: BBC

==== Results by matchday ====
Matchday	1	2	3	4	5	6	7	8	9	10	11	12	13	14	15	16	17	18	19	20	21	22	23	24	25	26	27	28	29	30	31	32	33	34	35	36	37	38	39	40	41	42	43	44	45	46
Ground	H	A	H	A	H	H	A	H	A	A	H	H	H	A	A	A	H	A	H	H	A	H	A	H	A	H	H	A	H	A	H	A	A	H	H	A	A	H	A	H	A	A	H	A	H	A
Result	W	L	W	L	L	L	L	W	L	D	L	W	L	W	L	L	L	L	D	L	W	L	D	L	L	W	L	L	W	D	W	L	L	L	L	W	W	L	L	L	L	L	W	L	L	W
Position	1	13	6	7	15	17	19	20	20	20	20	18	19	16	19	20	21	22	22	23	22	23	23	22	22	19	21	22	20	19	18	19	20	22	23	19	19	20	20	23	23	24	23	23	23	23

Updated to match(es) played on 5 April 2021. Source: 11v11 for league tables and fixtures
A = Away; H = Home; W = Win; D = Draw; L = Loss

==== Matches ====
The 2020–21 season fixtures were released on 21 August.

Win Draw Loss Postponed

12 September 2020 1	Swindon Town	3–1	Rochdale	Swindon
15:00 BST	T.Smith 4'; A.Grant 33'; M.Smith 41'; Jaiyesimi (yellow card) 46'; Pitman (yellow card) 90'	Report	Lund (yellow card) 89'; Keohane 90+3'	Stadium: County Ground; Attendance: Behind closed doors Referee: Alan Young
Note: Match behind closed doors due to COVID-19

19 September 2020 2	Blackpool	2–0	Swindon Town	Blackpool
15:00 BST	Ward (yellow card) 11'; Hamilton 41', 47'	Report	Jaiyesimi (yellow card) 63'	Stadium: Bloomfield Road; Attendance: 1000 (Home Fans Only); Referee: Andy Haines
Note: Match Limited to 1000 Capacity due to COVID-19

26 September 2020 3	Swindon Town	4–2	Burton Albion	Swindon
15:00 BST	Stevens 7'; Pitman 31'; Payne (yellow card) 34'; Baudry 35'; Fryers (yellow card) 45'; M.Smith (yellow card) 58'; J.Smith 60'	Report	Quinn 40'; Akins 77'	Stadium: County Ground; Attendance: Behind closed doors Referee: Kevin Johnson
Note: Match behind closed doors due to COVID-19

3 October 2020 4	Peterborough United	3–1	Swindon Town	Peterborough
15:00 BST	Clarke-Harris 48' 69' (pen.); Broom 78'	Report	Payne 6'; Baudry (yellow card) 45'; Caddis (yellow card) 68'; Grounds (yellow card) 90+1'	Stadium: London Road Stadium; Attendance: Behind closed doors Referee: Leigh Doughty
Note: Match behind closed doors due to COVID-19

10 October 2020 5	Swindon Town	0–1	AFC Wimbledon	Swindon
15:00 BST	Stevens (yellow card) 19'	Report	Pigott 28'; McLoughlin (yellow card) 66'	Stadium: County Ground; Attendance: Behind closed doors Referee: Will Finnie
Note: Match behind closed doors due to COVID-19

17 October 2020 6	Swindon Town	0–2	Sunderland	Swindon
15:00 BST	Donohue (yellow card) 16'; M.Smith (yellow card) 81'; Grounds (yellow card) 83'	Report	Wyke 37'; Maguire 57' (pen.)	Stadium: County Ground; Attendance: Behind closed doors Referee: Ben Toner
Note: Match behind closed doors due to COVID-19

20 October 2020 7	Northampton Town	2–1	Swindon Town	Northampton
19:45 BST	Missilou 7' (yellow card) 62'; Rose 28'; Bolger (yellow card) 51'; Hoskins (yellow card) 86'; H.Smith (yellow card) 90+1'	Report	Jaiyesimi (yellow card) 65'; T.Smith 76' (pen.); Grounds (yellow card) 81'	Stadium: Sixfields Stadium; Attendance: Behind closed doors Referee: Jarred Gillett
Note: Match behind closed doors due to COVID-19

24 October 2020	Oxford United	P–P	Swindon Town	Oxford
15:00 BST		Report		Stadium: Kassam Stadium
Note: The match was postponed on 23 October 2020 after a number of positive cases for COVID-19 within the Swindon Town squad

27 October 2020	Swindon Town	P–P	Accrington Stanley	Swindon
19:00 BST		Report		Stadium: County Ground
Note: The match was postponed on 26 October 2020 after a number of positive cases for COVID-19 within the Swindon Town and Accrington Stanley squads

31 October 2020 8	Swindon Town	2–1	Hull City	Swindon
15:00 BST	Caddis 31'; J.Grant 54'	Report	Lewis-Potter 16', (yellow card) 90+5' de Wijs (yellow card) 76'; Elder (yellow card) 86'	Stadium: County Ground; Attendance: Behind closed doors Referee: Antony Coggins
Note: Match behind closed doors due to COVID-19

3 November 2020 9	Plymouth Argyle	4–2	Swindon Town	Plymouth
19:00 GMT	Jephcott 6', 25'; Edwards 7'; Fornah (yellow card) 14'; Hardie (yellow card) 76'; C.Grant 89'	Report	Payne (yellow card) 4'; Hope 10'; A.Grant 23'; J.Smith (yellow card) 38' (yellow-red card) 45+4'; M.Smith (yellow card) 62'	Stadium: Home Park; Attendance: Behind closed doors Referee: John Busby
Note: Match behind closed doors due to COVID-19

14 November 2020 10	Shrewsbury Town	3–3	Swindon Town	Shrewsbury
15:00 GMT	Pierre 11'; Millar 16'; Edwards (yellow card) 33' (goal) 56'; Norburn (yellow card) 88'	Report	Hope (yellow card) 24' (goal) 61'; A.Grant (yellow card) 27'; J.Grant 43'; M.Smith 90+3'	Stadium: New Meadow; Attendance: Behind closed doors Referee: Sam Allison
Note: Match behind closed doors due to COVID-19

17 November 2020 11	Swindon Town	0–3	Accrington Stanley	Swindon
19:00 GMT	Grounds (yellow card) 73'; A.Grant (yellow card) 84'	Report	Fryer 6' (o.g.); Bishop 25'; Charles 38'	Stadium: County Ground; Attendance: Behind closed doors Referee: Tom Nield
Note: Match behind closed doors due to COVID-19

21 November 2020 12	Swindon Town	1–0	Bristol Rovers	Swindon
15:00 GMT	Donohue (yellow card) 38'; Grounds (yellow card) 62'; Odimayo (yellow card) 64'; Pitman 76'	Report	Nicholson (yellow card) 78'; Upson (yellow card) 90+2'	Stadium: County Ground; Attendance: Behind closed doors Referee: Thomas Bramall
Note: Match behind closed doors due to COVID-19

24 November 2020 13	Swindon Town	0–1	Lincoln City	Swindon
19:00 GMT	M.Smith (yellow card) 28'; Broadbent (yellow card) 43'; Baudry 50'; Donohue (yellow card) 52'; Odimayo (yellow card) 59'	Report	Montsma 74'; Jones (yellow card) 90'	Stadium: County Ground; Attendance: Behind closed doors Referee: Graham Salisbury
Note: Match behind closed doors due to COVID-19

28 November 2020 14	Oxford United	1–2	Swindon Town	Oxford
15:00 GMT	M.Taylor 15'; Obita (yellow card) 64'; Sykes (yellow card) 77'; Eastwood (yellow card) 79'; Shodipo (yellow card) 84'; Long (yellow card) 90+5'	Report	T.Smith (yellow card) 23' (goal) 90+1'; Broadbent 85'; A.Grant (yellow card) 90+5'	Stadium: Kassam Stadium; Attendance: Behind closed doors Referee: Carl Boyeson
Note: Match behind closed doors due to COVID-19

1 December 2020 15	Crewe Alexandra	4–2	Swindon Town	Crewe
19:00 GMT	Powell 39'; Ng 54'; Lowery 63'; Dale 66'	Report	A.Grant 20'; T.Smith 38'; Broadbent (yellow card) 68'	Stadium: Gresty Road; Attendance: Behind closed doors Referee: Sam Barrott
Note: Match behind closed doors due to COVID-19

5 December 2020 16	Gillingham	2–0	Swindon Town	Gillingham
13:00 GMT	Robertson (yellow card) 12'; Oliver 17'; McKenzie (yellow card) 63'; Coyle 80'	Report	Payne (yellow card) 25'; Odimayo (yellow card) 42'; Conroy (yellow card) 53'	Stadium: Priestfield Stadium; Attendance: Behind closed doors Referee: Neil Hair
Note: Match behind closed doors due to COVID-19

12 December 2020 17	Swindon Town	0–1	Fleetwood Town	Swindon
15:00 GMT	Hope (yellow card) 35'; Grounds (yellow card) 61'	Report	Madden 29'; Camps (yellow card) 57'; Connolly (yellow card) 82'; Duffy (yellow card) 90+3'	Stadium: County Ground; Attendance: 2000 (Home Fans Only); Referee: Christopher Pollard
Note: Match Limited to 2000 Capacity due to COVID-19

15 December 2020 18	Doncaster Rovers	2–1	Swindon Town	Doncaster
19:00 GMT	James 47' 72'	Report	Conroy (yellow card) 40'; Grounds (yellow card) 50'; Fryers (yellow card) 52'; Stevens (yellow card) 88'; Jaiyesimi 90+8' (pen.)	Stadium: Keepmoat Stadium; Attendance: Behind closed doors Referee: Paul Howard
Note: Match behind closed doors due to COVID-19

19 December 2020 19	Swindon Town	2–2	Charlton Athletic	Swindon
15:00 GMT	Jaiyesimi 26'; Odimayo (yellow card) 63'; Pitman 90' (yellow card) 90+3'	Report	Bogle 37'; Forster-Caskey (yellow card) 53'; Aneke 61'; Purrington (yellow card) 86'	Stadium: County Ground; Attendance: 2000 (Home Fans Only); Referee: Ben Speedie
Note: Match Limited to 2000 Capacity due to COVID-19

26 December 2020	Portsmouth	P–P	Swindon Town	Portsmouth
15:00 GMT		Report		Stadium: Fratton Park
Note: The match was postponed on 23 December 2020 after a number of positive cases for COVID-19 within the Portsmouth squad.

29 December 2020 20	Swindon Town	1–4	Milton Keynes Dons	Swindon
19:00 GMT	Payne 37'; Hunt (red card) 83'	Report	Jerome 4' 40'; Harvie 28'; Poole 77'	Stadium: County Ground; Attendance: Behind closed doors Referee: Sam Purkiss
Note: Match behind closed doors due to COVID-19

2 January 2021	Swindon Town	P–P	Wigan Athletic	Swindon
15:00 GMT		Report		Stadium: County Ground
Note: The match was postponed on 2 January 2021 due to a frozen Pitch.

9 January 2021 21	Ipswich Town	2–3	Swindon Town	Ipswich
17:30 GMT	Downes (yellow card) 53'; Norwood 62', (yellow card) 71'; Judge 87'	Report	Caddis (yellow card) 10'; Jaiyesimi 16', 74'; Twine 67'	Stadium: Portman Road; Attendance: Behind closed doors Referee: Seb Stockbridge
Note: Match behind closed doors due to COVID-19 Also Live on Sky Sports

16 January 2021 22	Swindon Town	1–2	Doncaster Rovers	Swindon
15:00 GMT	Conroy (yellow card) 64'; Thompson (yellow card) 66'; Hope 73'; Curran (yellow card) 76'	Report	Okenabirhie 5' (yellow card) 33' (goal) 45+1'; Simões (yellow card) 52'; Butler (yellow card) 71'; James (yellow card) 85'; Greaves (yellow card) 90+5'	Stadium: County Ground; Attendance: Behind closed doors Referee: Ollie Yates
Note: Match behind closed doors due to COVID-19

23 January 2021 23	Charlton Athletic	2–2	Swindon Town	London (Charlton)
15:00 GMT	Aneke 57'; Shinnie 90'	Report	Hope 5'; Twine (yellow card) 34'; Palmer 39'; Jaiyesimi (yellow card) 84'; Thompson (yellow card) 90'	Stadium: The Valley; Attendance: Behind closed doors Referee: James Linington
Note: Match behind closed doors due to COVID-19

26 January 2021 24	Swindon Town	0–2	Plymouth Argyle	Swindon
19:00 GMT		Report	Camará 36'; Hardie 67'	Stadium: County Ground; Attendance: Behind closed doors Referee: Bobby Madley
Note: Match behind closed doors due to COVID-19

30 January 2021 25	Hull City	1–0	Swindon Town	Kingston upon Hull
15:00 GMT	Docherty 5'	Report	Lyden (yellow card) 62'	Stadium: KCOM Stadium; Attendance: Behind closed doors Referee: Trevor Kettle
Note: Match behind closed doors due to COVID-19

2 February 2021 26	Swindon Town	1–0	Wigan Athletic	Swindon
18:00 GMT	Pitman 17'; Palmer (yellow card) 54'; Conroy (red card) 65'; Thompson (yellow card) 83'	Report	J.Jones (yellow card) 52'; Merrie (yellow card) 78'	Stadium: County Ground; Attendance: Behind closed doors Referee: David Rock
Note: Match behind closed doors due to COVID-19

6 February 2021 27	Swindon Town	0–1	Shrewsbury Town	Swindon
15:00 GMT	Curran (yellow card) 56'; Hope (yellow card) 73'; Pitman (yellow card) 90+5'	Report	Chapman 34'	Stadium: County Ground; Attendance: Behind closed doors Referee: Antony Coggins
Note: Match behind closed doors due to COVID-19

9 February 2021 28	Portsmouth	2–0	Swindon Town	Portsmouth
19:00 GMT	Curtis 8'; Harrison 64' (pen.)	Report	Payne (yellow card) 45'	Stadium: Fratton Park; Attendance: Behind closed doors Referee: Christopher Pollard
Note: Match behind closed doors due to COVID-19

13 February 2021	Bristol Rovers	P–P	Swindon Town	Bristol
15:00 GMT		Report		Stadium: Memorial Stadium
Note: The match was postponed on 13 February 2021 due to a frozen Pitch

20 February 2021 29	Swindon Town	2–1	Crewe Alexandra	Swindon
15:00 GMT	Johnson 10' (o.g.); Thompson (yellow card) 84'; Twine 90+4'	Report	Lowery 5' (yellow card) 70'	Stadium: County Ground; Attendance: Behind closed doors Referee: Ben Toner
Note: Match behind closed doors due to COVID-19

23 February 2021 30	Lincoln City	2–2	Swindon Town	Lincoln
19:45 GMT	McGrandles (yellow card) 12'; J.Grant 26' (pen.); Rogers 59'; Montsma (yellow card) 74'	Report	Garrick 2'; Palmer (yellow card) 19'; Pitman 45'; Odimayo (yellow card) 57'	Stadium: Sincil Bank; Attendance: Behind closed doors Referee: Declan Bourne
Note: Match behind closed doors due to COVID-19

27 February 2021 31	Swindon Town	2–1	Northampton Town	Swindon
15:00 GMT	Twine 45+2'; Palmer (yellow card) 51'; Grounds (yellow card) 67'; Pitman 69'	Report	Watson 26'; Mills (yellow card) 64'; Morris (yellow card) 75'	Stadium: The County Ground; Attendance: Behind closed doors Referee: Ben Speedie
Note: Match behind closed doors due to COVID-19

2 March 2021 32	Sunderland	1–0	Swindon Town	Sunderland
19:00 GMT	Wyke 70'	Report		Stadium: Stadium of Light; Attendance: Behind closed doors Referee: Peter Wright
Note: Match behind closed doors due to COVID-19

6 March 2021 33	Accrington Stanley	2–1	Swindon Town	Accrington
15:00 GMT	Charles 11'; Hughes (yellow card) 31'; Bishop 44'; Butcher (yellow card) 45+2'; Burgess (yellow card) 59'	Report	Pitman 30'	Stadium: Crown Ground; Attendance: Behind closed doors Referee: Craig Hicks
Note: Match behind closed doors due to COVID-19

9 March 2021 34	Swindon Town	1–2	Oxford United	Swindon
19:00 GMT	Lyden (yellow card) 9'; Thompson (yellow card) 33'; Conroy (yellow card) 51'; Pitman (penalty missed) 72'; Curran 90+2'	Report	Barker 3'; Sykes (yellow card) 34'; Forde (yellow card) 76'; Agyei 82', (yellow card) 88'	Stadium: County Ground; Attendance: Behind closed doors Referee: Charles Breakspear
Note: Match behind closed doors due to COVID-19

13 March 2021 35	Swindon Town	1–3	Gillingham	Swindon
13:00 GMT	Pitman 41'; Twine (yellow card) 76'	Report	Ogilvie (yellow card) 47'; Oliver 59', 63'; Dempsey 68'; O'Keefe (yellow card) 76'	Stadium: The County Ground; Attendance: Behind closed doors Referee: James Bell
Note: Match behind closed doors due to COVID-19

20 March 2021 36	Fleetwood Town	0–2	Swindon Town	Fleetwood
15:00 GMT	Finley (yellow card) 11'; Hill (yellow card) 76'	Report	Twine 5' 60' (yellow card) 75'	Stadium: Highbury Stadium; Attendance: Behind closed doors Referee: Graham Salisbury
Note: Match behind closed doors due to COVID-19

23 March 2021 37	Bristol Rovers	0–1	Swindon Town	Bristol
19:00 GMT	Upson (yellow card) 11'; Williams (yellow card) 76'	Report	Payne 71'	Stadium: Memorial Stadium; Attendance: Behind closed doors Referee: Andy Woolmer
Note: Match behind closed doors due to COVID-19

27 March 2021	Rochdale	P–P	Swindon Town	Rochdale
15:00 GMT		Report		Stadium: Spotland Stadium
Note: The match was postponed on 27 March 2021 due to international call-ups for Rochdale and Swindon Town.

2 April 2021 38	Swindon Town	0–2	Blackpool	Swindon
15:00 BST		Report	Dougall (yellow card) 18'; Simms 44'; Yates 61'	Stadium: The County Ground; Attendance: Behind closed doors Referee: Carl Boyeson
Note: Match behind closed doors due to COVID-19

5 April 2021 39	Burton Albion	2–1	Swindon Town	Burton upon Trent
15:00 BST	Hamer 26'; Hemmings (yellow card) 64'; Brayford 83'	Report	Payne 35'	Stadium: Pirelli Stadium; Attendance: Behind closed doors Referee: Lee Swabey
Note: Match behind closed doors due to COVID-19

10 April 2021 40	Swindon Town	0–3	Peterborough United	Swindon
15:00 BST	Twine (yellow card) 37'; Camp (yellow card) 61'	Report	Dembélé 17' 23'; Clarke-Harris (penalty missed) 61' 90+4'; Taylor (yellow card) 86'	Stadium: County Ground; Attendance: Behind closed doors Referee: Josh Smith
Note: Match behind closed doors due to COVID-19

13 April 2021 41	Rochdale	2–1	Swindon Town	Rochdale
19:00 BST	Keohane 12'; C.Grant 64'; Osho (yellow card) 74'	Report	Garrick 88'	Stadium: Spotland Stadium; Attendance: Behind closed doors Referee: Sam Allison
Note: Match behind closed doors due to COVID-19

17 April 2021 42	AFC Wimbledon	4–1	Swindon Town	London
17:30 BST	Pigott 20' (pen.), 60'; Nightingale 26'; Assal 44'; McLoughlin (yellow card) 90+3'	Report	Grounds (yellow card) 20'; Lyden (yellow card) 26'; Pitman (yellow card) 45+2'; Smith 79'	Stadium: Plough Lane; Attendance: Behind closed doors Referee: John Busby
Note: Match behind closed doors due to COVID-19

20 April 2021 43	Swindon Town	3–1	Portsmouth	Swindon
18:00 BST	Pitman 18' 61' (pen.); Thompson (yellow card) 72'; Smith 90+1'	Report	Daniels (yellow card) 60'; Curtis 82'; Nicolaisen (yellow card) 84'; Cannon (yellow card) 90+3'	Stadium: County Ground; Attendance: Behind closed doors Referee: Ben Toner
Note: Match behind closed doors due to COVID-19

24 April 2021 44	Milton Keynes Dons	5–0	Swindon Town	Milton Keynes
15:00 BST	Grigg 16', 45+2', 46', 49'; Fraser 26' (pen.)	Report		Stadium: Stadium MK; Attendance: Behind closed doors Referee: Scott Oldham
Note: Match behind closed doors due to COVID-19; Swindon relegated to League 2

1 May 2021 45	Swindon Town	1–2	Ipswich Town	Swindon
15:00 BST	Thompson (yellow card) 34'; Grounds (yellow card) 43'; Pitman 71'; Curran (yellow card) 74'	Report	Norwood 44' (pen.) 58' (penalty missed) 74'; Downes (yellow card) 81'	Stadium: County Ground; Attendance: Behind closed doors Referee: Kevin Johnson
Note: Match behind closed doors due to COVID-19

9 May 2021 46	Wigan Athletic	3–4	Swindon Town	Wigan
12:00 BST	Tilt 17' (red card) 66'; Keane 56' 60'	Report	Grounds (yellow card) 42'; Twine 59' 90+2'; Hope 77'; Smith 90'	Stadium: DW Stadium; Attendance: Behind closed doors Referee: Graham Salisbury
Note: Match behind closed doors due to COVID-19

=== FA Cup ===
The draw for the first round was made on Monday 26, October.

Win Draw Loss

7 November 2020 First round	Swindon Town	1–2	Darlington	Swindon
15:00 GMT	Pitman 41'; Grounds (yellow card) 51'; Iandolo (yellow card) 82'	Report	Campbell 31', 60'; Hedley (yellow card) 45+6'; Hunt (yellow card) 82'	Stadium: The County Ground; Attendance: Behind closed doors Referee: Declan Bourne
Note: Match behind closed doors due to COVID-19

=== EFL Cup ===
The first round draw was made on 18 August .

Win Draw Loss

5 August 2020 First round	Swindon Town	1–3	Charlton Athletic	Swindon
15:00 BST	J.Smith 64'; Doughty (yellow card) 74'; Odimayo (yellow card) 81'	Report	Oztumer (yellow card) 23'; Bonne 36'; Barker 74'; Aneke 90'	Stadium: The County Ground; Attendance: Behind closed doors Referee: Brett Huxtable
Note: Match behind closed doors due to COVID-19

=== EFL Trophy ===
The regional group stage draw was confirmed on 18 August.

Pos	Div	Team	Pld	W	PW	PL	L	GF	GA	GD	Pts	Qualification
1	L2	Exeter City	3	3	0	0	0	11	5	+6	9	Advance to Round 2
2	L2	Forest Green Rovers	3	1	0	0	2	5	4	+1	3	Advance to Round 2
3	L1	Swindon Town	3	1	0	0	2	6	7	−1	3	
4	ACA	West Bromwich Albion U21	3	1	0	0	2	3	9	−6	3	

Source: EFL.com

Win Draw Loss

8 September 2020 Group stage	Swindon Town	2–3	West Bromwich Albion U21	Swindon
19:00 BST	T.Smith 72'; Caddis 75'	Report	Dyce 27'; Windsor 47'; Gardner-Hickman 74'	Stadium: County Ground; Attendance: Behind closed doors Referee: Chris Sarginson
Note: Match behind closed doors due to COVID-19

6 October 2020 Group stage	Swindon Town	3–4	Exeter City	Swindon
19:00 BST	A.Grant (yellow card) 43'; T.Smith 61', 85'; Curran (yellow card) 75'; Palmer 90+3'	Report	Kite 4'; Seymour 7' (pen.); Atangana 63'; Hartridge 68'; Sweeney (yellow card) 78'	Stadium: County Ground; Attendance: Behind closed doors Referee: Craig Hicks
Note: Match behind closed doors due to COVID-19

10 November 2020 Group stage	Forest Green Rovers	0–1	Swindon Town	Nailsworth
19:00 GMT	Covil (yellow card) 49'	Report	Curran (yellow card) 38'; Broadbent 90+3'	Stadium: The New Lawn; Attendance: Behind closed doors Referee: Lee Swabey
Note: Match behind closed doors due to COVID-19
