= 2020–21 Doncaster Rovers F.C. season =

Doncaster Rovers
2020–21 season
- Chairman: David Blunt
- Manager: Darren Moore (until 1 March); Andy Butler (from 1 March)
- Stadium: Keepmoat Stadium
- League One: 14th
- FA Cup: Fourth round
- EFL Cup: First round
- EFL Trophy: Group stage
- Top goalscorer: League: Fejiri Okenabirhie (14 goals); All: Fejiri Okenabirhie (16 goals)
Home colours	Away colours

The 2020–21 Doncaster Rovers F.C. season was the Doncaster Rovers F.C. 142nd season in their history and the fourth consecutive season in EFL League One, Along with League One, the club contested in the FA Cup, EFL Cup and EFL Trophy.

The season covered the period from 1 July 2020 to 30 June 2021.

== Pre-season ==
Donny announced 6 pre-season friendlies against Manchester United U23s, Bradford City, and Scunthorpe United, plus a home and away tie against a Championship club yet to be announced, and a non league game.

15 August 2020 Friendly	Scunthorpe United	2–3	Doncaster Rovers	Scunthorpe
12:00 BST	Eisa 72'; Barks 84'	Report	Halliday 47'; Whiteman 75'; Anderson 87'	Stadium: Glanford Park

18 August 2020 Friendly	Bradford City	3–4	Doncaster Rovers	Bradford
	Clarke 49'; Guthrie 61' 70'	Report	Lokilo 22'; Okenabirhie 65' 82' (pen.); James Coppinger 79'	Stadium: Valley Parade

22 August 2020 Friendly	Derby County	0–0	Doncaster Rovers	Derby
15:00 BST		Report		Stadium: Derby County Training Centre

3 September 2020 Friendly	Doncaster Rovers	5–0	Manchester United U23s	Doncaster
15:00 BST	Taylor 6' 30'; Butler 25'; Gomes 55'; Coppinger 87'	Report		Stadium: Keepmoat Stadium

== Competitions ==
=== EFL League One ===
==== League table ====
Pos	Team	Pld	W	D	L	GF	GA	GD	Pts
10	Gillingham	46	19	10	17	63	60	+3	67
11	Accrington Stanley	46	18	13	15	63	68	−5	67
12	Crewe Alexandra	46	18	12	16	56	61	−5	66
13	Milton Keynes Dons	46	18	11	17	64	62	+2	65
14	Doncaster Rovers	46	19	7	20	63	67	−4	64
15	Fleetwood Town	46	16	12	18	49	46	+3	60
16	Burton Albion	46	15	12	19	61	73	−12	57
17	Shrewsbury Town	46	13	15	18	50	57	−7	54
18	Plymouth Argyle	46	14	11	21	53	80	−27	53

Source: EFL Official Website
Rules for classification: 1) Points; 2) Goal difference; 3) Number of goals scored; 4) Head-to-head results; 5) Wins; 6) Away goals; 7) Penalty points (sec 9.5); 8) 12-point sending off offences

==== Results summary ====
Overall								Home						Away					
Pld	W	D	L	GF	GA	GD	Pts	W	D	L	GF	GA	GD	W	D	L	GF	GA	GD
46	19	7	20	63	67	−4	64	11	4	8	34	32	+2	8	3	12	29	35	−6

Last updated: 9 May 2021.
Source: BBC

==== Results by matchday ====
Matchday	1	2	3	4	5	6	7	8	9	10	11	12	13	14	15	16	17	18	19	20	21	22	23	24	25	26	27	28	29	30	31	32	33	34	35	36	37	38	39	40	41	42	43	44	45	46
Ground	H	A	H	A	A	H	H	A	H	A	H	H	A	A	H	H	A	H	A	H	H	A	H	A	A	H	H	A	H	H	A	H	A	A	A	H	A	H	H	A	A	H	A	A	A	H
Result	D	W	W	L	W	W	L	L	W	D	D	W	L	W	W	W	W	L	W	W	W	W	W	L	L	L	D	L	W	W	L	D	L	D	L	L	L	L	L	W	L	L	D	W	L	L
Position	12	4	3	5	7	6	7	9	8	9	11	10	10	8	7	6	4	4	4	4	4	3	3	5	5	5	4	6	6	5	5	5	5	5	7	9	10	11	12	10	13	13	13	12	12	14

Updated to match(es) played on 9 May 2021. Source: 11v11 for league tables and fixtures
A = Away; H = Home; W = Win; D = Draw; L = Loss

==== Matches ====
Win Draw Loss Postponed

The 2020–21 season fixtures were released on 21 August.

12 September 2020 1	Doncaster Rovers	1–1	Milton Keynes Dons	Doncaster
15:00 BST	Gomes 53'; Richards (yellow card) 83'; Whiteman (yellow card) 85'	Report	Houghton (yellow card) 74'; Cargill 88'	Stadium: Keepmoat Stadium; Referee: Andy Haines

19 September 2020 2	Charlton Athletic	1–3	Doncaster Rovers	Charlton
15:00 BST	Washington 67'	Report	Gomes 25'; Barker 49' (o.g.); James (yellow card) 52'; John-Jules 63'; Whiteman (yellow card) 69'	Stadium: The Valley; Attendance: 1,000; Referee: John Busby

26 September 2020 3	Doncaster Rovers	4–1	Bristol Rovers	Doncaster
15:00 BST	James (yellow card) 16'; Wright 23'; Whiteman (yellow card) 28'; Gomes 30'; Richards 57'; Taylor 62'	Report	Harries (yellow card) 22'; Ehmer (yellow card) 29'; Daly 32'; Tutonda (yellow card) 86'	Stadium: Keepmoat Stadium; Referee: Trevor Kettle

3 October 2020 4	Wigan Athletic	1–0	Doncaster Rovers	Wigan
15:00 BST	Garner 59' (yellow card) 81'	Report	Coppinger (yellow card) 28'; Richards (yellow card) 78'	Stadium: DW Stadium; Referee: Carl Boyeson

10 October 2020	Doncaster Rovers	v	Shrewsbury Town	Doncaster
15:00 BST				Stadium: Keepmoat Stadium

17 October 2020 5	Portsmouth	0–1	Doncaster Rovers	Portsmouth
15:00 BST	Harness (yellow card) 38'	Report	James (yellow card) 11' (goal) 79'; Wright (yellow card) 45+2'; Gomes (yellow card) 90+1'	Stadium: Fratton Park; Referee: Brett Huxtable

20 October 2020 6	Doncaster Rovers	4–1	Ipswich Town	Doncaster
19:00 BST	John 28'; Whiteman 37' 62' (pen.); Okenabirhie 64'	Report	Wright 15' (o.g.); Dozzell (yellow card) 46'; Nsiala (yellow card) 61'; Wilson (yellow card) 82'	Stadium: Keepmoat Stadium; Referee: Scott Oldham

24 October 2020 7	Doncaster Rovers	1–2	Crewe Alexandra	Doncaster
15:00 BST	Sims 27'; Halliday (yellow card) 64'	Report	Kirk 26'; Pickering 70'	Stadium: Keepmoat Stadium; Referee: Craig Hicks

27 October 2020 8	Plymouth Argyle	2–1	Doncaster Rovers	Plymouth
19:45 GMT	Jephcott 34'; Edwards (yellow card) 65' (goal) 68'; Hardie (yellow card) 81'; Cooper (yellow card) 90+3'	Report	Okenabirhie 73'; James (yellow card) 85'	Stadium: Home Park; Referee: Alan Young

31 October 2020 9	Doncaster Rovers	1–0	Lincoln City	Doncaster
15:00 GMT	Whiteman 43'; Wright (yellow card) 71'	Report	Eyoma (yellow card) 74'	Stadium: Keepmoat Stadium; Referee: Robert Madley

3 November 2020 10	AFC Wimbledon	2–2	Doncaster Rovers	Wimbledon
19:45 GMT	Pigott 18', 83'	Report	Smith 24'; Wright (yellow card) 37'; Coppinger 90+1'	Stadium: Plough Lane; Referee: Darren Drysdale

21 November 2020 11	Doncaster Rovers	1–1	Sunderland	Doncaster
15:00 GMT	Lokilo (yellow card) 39'; Wright (yellow card) 67'; Okenabirhie 90+3'	Report	Leadbitter 43'	Stadium: Keepmoat Stadium; Referee: John Busby

24 November 2020 12	Doncaster Rovers	3–2	Blackpool	Doncaster
19:00 GMT	John 48'; James 52'; Sims (yellow card) 59'; Halliday (yellow card) 66'; Whiteman 76' (pen.)	Report	Yates 10' (pen.); Hamilton 38'; Grétarsson (yellow card) 68'	Stadium: Keepmoat Stadium; Referee: Ross Joyce

2 December 2020 13	Hull City	2–1	Doncaster Rovers	Hull
19:00 GMT	Magennis 26'; Smallwood (yellow card) 27'; Wilks (yellow card) 54'; Eaves 87'	Report	John-Jules 81'; Anderson (yellow card) 90+3'	Stadium: KCOM Stadium; Referee: Christopher Pollard

5 December 2020 14	Northampton Town	0–2	Doncaster Rovers	Northampton
15:00 GMT	McWilliams (red card) 18'; Horsfall (yellow card) 27'	Report	Halliday (yellow card) 25'; John-Jules 36'; Wright 57'; Whiteman (penalty missed) 81'	Stadium: Sixfields Stadium; Attendance: 1,164; Referee: Graham Salisbury

12 December 2020 15	Doncaster Rovers	2–1	Gillingham	Doncaster
15:00 GMT	James 29'; Halliday 53'; Smith (yellow card) 86'	Report	Dempsey 51'	Stadium: Keepmoat Stadium; Attendance: 0 Referee: Trevor Kettle

15 December 2020 16	Doncaster Rovers	2–1	Swindon Town	Doncaster
19:00 GMT	James 47' 72'	Report	Conroy (yellow card) 40'; Grounds (yellow card) 50'; Fryers (yellow card) 52'; Stevens (yellow card) 88'; Jaiyesimi 90+8' (pen.)	Stadium: Keepmoat Stadium; Referee: Paul Howard

19 December 2020 17	Burton Albion	1–3	Doncaster Rovers	Burton upon Trent
15:00 GMT	Akins 44' (pen.)	Report	Okenabirhie 8'; Butler (yellow card) 35'; Richards (yellow card) 43' (goal) 59'; Whiteman 45+5' (pen.)	Stadium: Pirelli Stadium; Referee: Carl Brook

22 December 2020 18	Doncaster Rovers	0–1	Shrewsbury Town	Doncaster
19:45 GMT	Richards (yellow card) 52'; Smith (yellow card) 90+2'	Report	Pierre 53'	Stadium: The Keepmoat Stadium; Referee: James Oldham

16 January 2021 19	Swindon Town	1–2	Doncaster Rovers	Swindon
15:00 GMT	Conroy (yellow card) 64'; Thompson (yellow card) 66'; Hope 73'; Curran (yellow card) 76'	Report	Okenabirhie 5' 45+1' (yellow card) 65'; Simões (yellow card) 67'; Butler (yellow card) 71'; James (yellow card) 85'; Greaves (yellow card) 90+5'	Stadium: County Ground (Swindon); Referee: Ollie Yates

19 January 2021 20	Doncaster Rovers	1–0	Rochdale	Doncaster
19:00 GMT	Taylor 31'	Report	Baah (yellow card) 83'	Stadium: Keepmoat Stadium; Referee: Seb Stockbridge

26 January 2021 21	Doncaster Rovers	2–0	AFC Wimbledon	Doncaster
19:00 GMT	Okenabirhie 10'; Richards 37'	Report	Woodyard (yellow card) 45+1'	Stadium: Keepmoat Stadium; Referee: Peter Wright

30 January 2021 22	Lincoln City	0–1	Doncaster Rovers	Lincoln
15:00 GMT	Grant (penalty missed); Edun (yellow card) 72'; Scully (penalty missed)	Report	Richards 15'; Anderson (yellow card) 60'; Halliday (yellow card) 85'; Balcombe (yellow card) 87'	Stadium: Sincil Bank; Referee: Darren Bond

6 February 2021 23	Doncaster Rovers	3–2	Oxford United	Doncaster
15:00 GMT	Anderson (yellow card) 27'; Taylor 31'; Okenabirhie 47'; Richards 51'; Wright (yellow card) 81'	Report	Gorrin (yellow card) 29'; Long 41'; Shodipo 70'; Moore (yellow card) 90+8'	Stadium: Keepmoat Stadium; Referee: James Bell

9 February 2021 24	Fleetwood Town	3–1	Doncaster Rovers	Fleetwood
19:45 GMT	Vassell 60'; Madden 66'; Andrew 88'	Report	Lokilo 8'	Stadium: Highbury Stadium; Attendance: 0 Referee: Andy Haines

13 February 2021 25	Sunderland	4–1	Doncaster Rovers	Sunderland
15:00 GMT	Wyke 7', 12', 31', 54'; O'Nien (yellow card) 59'	Report	Burge 53' (o.g.); Taylor (penalty missed) 57'; Lokilo (penalty missed) 88'	Stadium: Stadium of Light; Referee: Neil Hair

16 February 2021 26	Doncaster Rovers	0–1	Accrington Stanley	Doncaster
19:00 GMT		Report	Smyth 42' (yellow card) 79'	Stadium: Keepmoat Stadium; Referee: Dean Whitestone

20 February 2021 27	Doncaster Rovers	3–3	Hull City	Doncaster
15:00 GMT	James 33'; Bogle 68' (pen.); Coppinger 90+12'	Report	Wilks 19', 24'; Greaves 38'; Docherty (yellow card) 55'; Honeyman (yellow card) 61'; Coyle (yellow card) 80'	Stadium: Keepmoat Stadium; Referee: Charles Breakspear

27 February 2021 28	Ipswich Town	2–1	Doncaster Rovers	Ipswich
15:00 GMT	Judge 24'; Kenlock (yellow card) 47'; Norwood 54'	Report	Taylor 73'	Stadium: Portman Road; Referee: Martin Coy

2 March 2021 29	Doncaster Rovers	2–1	Portsmouth	Doncaster
19:00 GMT	Taylor (yellow card) 10'; James 12'; Okenabirhie 70'; Smith (yellow card) 90+4'	Report	Harness (yellow card) 15'; Nicolaisen (yellow card) 59'; Marquis (yellow card) 82' (goal) 90+4'	Stadium: Keepmoat Stadium; Referee: Ross Joyce

6 March 2021 30	Doncaster Rovers	2–1	Plymouth Argyle	Doncaster
15:00 GMT	Anderson 7'; Bostock (yellow card) 39'; Bogle 47'	Report	Ennis 49'	Stadium: Keepmoat Stadium; Referee: Declan Bourne

9 March 2021 31	Crewe Alexandra	1–0	Doncaster Rovers	Crewe
19:00 GMT	Beckles (yellow card) 43'; Wintle (yellow card) 53'; Mandron 56'; Lowery (yellow card) 90+4'	Report	James (yellow card) 61'; Robertson (yellow card) 72'	Stadium: Gresty Road; Referee: Ben Speedie

13 March 2021 32	Doncaster Rovers	0–0	Northampton Town	Doncaster
15:00 GMT		Report	Edmondson (yellow card) 45+1'; Watson (yellow card) 63'; Rose (yellow card) 81'; Marshall (yellow card) 90+1'; Kioso (yellow card) 90+2'	Stadium: Keepmoat Stadium; Referee: Tom Nield

16 March 2021 33	Oxford United	3–0	Doncaster Rovers	Oxford
19:00 GMT	Taylor 19' 41'; Shodipo 45'; Hanson (yellow card) 72'; Stevens (yellow card) 86'	Report	Anderson (yellow card) 46'	Stadium: Kassam Stadium; Referee: Ben Toner

20 March 2021 34	Gillingham	2–2	Doncaster Rovers	Gillingham
15:00 GMT	Graham 2'; Oliver 4'	Report	Anderson 19'; Coppinger 23'; Okenabirhie (yellow card) 74'	Stadium: Priestfield Stadium; Referee: Will Finnie

27 March 2021 35	Milton Keynes Dons	1–0	Doncaster Rovers	Bletchley
19:00 GMT	Harvie 76'; Thompson (yellow card) 81'	Report		Stadium: Stadium MK; Attendance: 0 Referee: Josh Smith

2 April 2021 36	Doncaster Rovers	0–1	Charlton Athletic	Doncaster
12:30 GMT	Halliday (yellow card) 55'	Report	Maatsen 12'; Stockley (yellow card) 55'; Purrington (yellow card) 70'	Stadium: Keepmoat Stadium; Referee: Marc Edwards

4 April 2021 37	Bristol Rovers	2–1	Doncaster Rovers	Bristol
15:00 GMT	McCormick 37', 56' (yellow card) 87'; Baldwin (yellow card) 67'; Hanlan (yellow card) 90+6'	Report	Coppinger 13'; Bogle (yellow card) 49'; Greaves (yellow card) 90+3'	Stadium: Memorial Stadium; Referee: Antony Coggins

10 April 2021 38	Doncaster Rovers	1–4	Wigan Athletic	Doncaster
15:00 GMT	Anderson (yellow card) 43'; Richards 45+3'; Wright (yellow card) 85'; Gomes (yellow card) 90+5'	Report	Dodoo 3', (yellow card) 57'; Aasgaard 15'; Solomon-Otabor 33'; Keane 81'; Jones (yellow card) 85'	Stadium: The Keepmoat Stadium; Referee: Alan Young

13 April 2021 39	Doncaster Rovers	0–3	Burton Albion	Doncaster
19:00 BST	Greaves (yellow card) 39'; Coppinger (yellow card) 78'	Report	Akins 59'; Hamer 72'; Carter 78'	Stadium: The Keepmoat Stadium; Attendance: 0 Referee: David Rock

17 April 2021 40	Shrewsbury Town	0–2	Doncaster Rovers	Shrewsbury
12:30 BST		Report	Okenabirhie 15'; Richards 80'	Stadium: Montgomery Waters Meadow; Attendance: 0 Referee: Andy Davies

20 April 2021 41	Accrington Stanley	2–1	Doncaster Rovers	Accrington
19:00 BST	Charles 41' (pen.), 90+1' (pen.)	Report	Balcombe (yellow card) 40'; John-Jules 76'; James (yellow card) 87'; Anderson (yellow card) 89'	Stadium: Wham Stadium; Attendance: 0 Referee: Anthony Backhouse

24 April 2021 42	Doncaster Rovers	0–1	Fleetwood Town	Doncaster
15:00 BST		Report	Rossiter (yellow card) 47'; McKay 51'	Stadium: The Keepmoat Stadium; Attendance: 0 Referee: Sam Barrott

27 April 2021 43	Peterborough United	2–2	Doncaster Rovers	Peterborough
19:45 BST	Ward 10'; Szmodics 23'; Butler (yellow card) 47'; Reed (yellow card) 49'; Kent (yellow card) 90'	Report	Okenabirhie 37'; Butler (yellow card) 44'; Smith (yellow card) 45+1'; Lokilo (yellow card) 48'; Richards 59'	Stadium: Weston Homes Stadium; Attendance: 0 Referee: Scott Oldham

1 May 2021 44	Rochdale	1–2	Doncaster Rovers	Rochdale
15:00 BST	Rathbone (yellow card) 54'; Done 83'; Keohane (yellow card) 90+3'	Report	Richards 30', 56'	Stadium: Spotland; Attendance: 0 Referee: Sebastian Stockbridge

4 May 2021 45	Blackpool	2–0	Doncaster Rovers	Blackpool
19:00 BST	Simms 22', 80'; Lawrence-Gabriel (yellow card) 42'; Stewart (yellow card) 55'; Husband (yellow card) 58'	Report	Wright (yellow card) 40'	Stadium: Bloomfield Road; Attendance: 0 Referee: Robert Lewis

9 May 2021 46	Doncaster Rovers	1–4	Peterborough United	Doncaster
12:00 BST	John-Jules 90+1'	Report	Eisa 6'; Mason 8'; Kanu 16'; Jones 39'	Stadium: Keepmoat Stadium; Attendance: 0 Referee: Peter Wright

=== FA Cup ===
The draw for the first round was made on Monday 26, October. The second round draw was revealed on Monday, 9 November by Danny Cowley. The third round draw was made on 30 November, with Premier League and EFL Championship clubs all entering the competition. The draw for the fourth and fifth round were made on 11 January, conducted by Peter Crouch.

7 November 2020 First round	FC United of Manchester	1–5	Doncaster Rovers	Moston
17:30 GMT	Linney 30'	Report	Okenabirhie 13'; Whiteman 21'; Sims 33', 50'; Coppinger 42'	Stadium: Broadhurst Park; Referee: Thomas Bramall

29 November 2020 Second round	Carlisle United	1–2	Doncaster Rovers	Carlisle
13:30 GMT	Kayode (yellow card) 43'; Mellish 78'	Report	Whiteman 32', 40'	Stadium: Brunton Park; Attendance: 0 Referee: Scott Oldham

9 January 2021 Third round	Blackburn Rovers	0–1	Doncaster Rovers	Blackburn
15:00 GMT	Downing (yellow card) 35'; Travis (yellow card) 40'; Davenport (yellow card) 90+2'	Report	Richards 42'; John (yellow card) 81'	Stadium: Ewood Park; Attendance: 0 Referee: Sam Barrott

23 January 2021 Fourth round	West Ham United	4–0	Doncaster Rovers	Stratford
15:00 GMT	Fornals 2'; Yarmolenko 32'; Butler 53' (o.g.); Afolayan 78'	Report		Stadium: London Stadium; Attendance: 0 Referee: Robert Jones

=== EFL Cup ===
The first round draw was made on 18 August, live on Sky Sports, by Paul Merson.

29 August 2020 First round	Blackburn Rovers	3–2	Doncaster Rovers	Blackburn
15:00 BST	Holtby 30'; Lenihan (yellow card) 53'; Rankin-Costello 72'; Armstrong 81' (pen.)	Report	Wright (yellow card) 44'; Okenabirhie 54' (pen.); Anderson (yellow card) 55'; Gomes 64'; Halliday (yellow card) 70'	Stadium: Ewood Park; Referee: Anthony Backhouse

=== EFL Trophy ===
The regional group stage draw was confirmed on 18 August.

Pos	Div	Team	Pld	W	PW	PL	L	GF	GA	GD	Pts	Qualification
1	L2	Oldham Athletic	3	3	0	0	0	9	1	+8	9	Advance to Round 2
2	ACA	Wolverhampton Wanderers U21	3	1	1	0	1	3	6	−3	5	Advance to Round 2
3	L2	Bradford City	3	0	0	2	1	2	4	−2	2	
4	L1	Doncaster Rovers	3	0	1	0	2	1	4	−3	2	

Source: EFL.com

8 September 2020 Group stage	Doncaster Rovers	0–0 (4–1 p)	Bradford City	Doncaster
19:30 BST		Report	Shanks (yellow card) 79'	Stadium: The Keepmoat Stadium; Referee: Seb Stockbridge
	Penalties
	Whiteman (penalty scored); Okenabirhie (penalty scored); Coppinger (penalty scored); Williams (penalty scored)		Guthrie (penalty scored); Pritchard (penalty missed); Longridge (penalty missed)

6 October 2020 Group stage	Oldham Athletic	2–0	Doncaster Rovers	Oldham
19:45 BST	Rowe 66'; Grant (yellow card) 82'; Dearnley 86'; Barnett (yellow card) 90+2'			Stadium: Boundary Park; Referee: Tom Nield

10 November 2020 Group stage	Doncaster Rovers	1–2	Wolverhampton Wanderers U21	Doncaster
19:45 GMT	Okenabirhie 23' (pen.); Amos (yellow card) 40'; Wright (yellow card) 68'	Report	Silva 15', 88'	Stadium: The Keepmoat Stadium; Referee: James Oldham

== Squad ==
=== Detailed overview ===
Players with previous first team games or current professional contracts with Doncaster before the start of the season, including those coming in from the Academy.
League caps and goals up to the start of season 2019–20.
Players with name and squad number struck through and marked † left the club during the playing season.

No.	Name	Position/s	Nationality	Place of Birth	Date of Birth (Age)	Club caps	Club goals	Int. caps	Int. goals	Signed from
Goalkeepers
—	Ian Lawlor	GK	(Republic of Ireland)	Dublin	27 October 1994 (age 31)	70	0	–	–	Manchester City
13	Louis Jones	GK	(England)	Doncaster	12 October 1998 (age 27)	0	0	–	–	Academy
32	Toby King	GK	(England)		4 January 2002 (age 24)	0	0	–	–	
Defenders
2	Brad Halliday	RB	(England)	Redcar	10 July 1995 (age 31)	34	0	–	–	Cambridge United
3	Reece James	LB	(England)	Bacup	7 November 1993 (age 32)	27	2	–	–	Sunderland
4	Tom Anderson	CB	(England)	Burnley	2 September 1993 (age 33)	62	4	–	–	Burnley
5	Joe Wright	CB	(Wales)	Monk Fryston	26 February 1995 (age 31)	89	2	–	–	Huddersfield Town
16	Danny Amos	LB	(Northern Ireland)	Sheffield	22 December 1999 (age 26)	6	0	–	–	Academy
28	Branden Horton	LB	(England)	Doncaster	9 September 2000 (age 25)	0	0	–	–	Academy
30	Ben Blythe		(England)			0	0	–	–	Academy
Midfielders
8	Benjamin Whiteman	AM/CM/RM	(England)	Rochdale	17 June 1996 (age 30)	115	14	–	–	Sheffield United
11	Jon Taylor	RW	(England)	Liverpool	20 July 1992 (age 34)	28	6	–	–	Rotherham United
12	Madger Gomes	CM	(Spain)	Alicante	1 February 1997 (age 29)	23	0	–	–	NK Istra 1961
26	James Coppinger	AM/RM/CM	(England)	Guisborough	18 January 1981 (age 45)	582	63	–	–	Exeter City
27	AJ Greaves	CM	(England)		17 November 2000 (age 25)	0	0	–	–	Academy
29	Lirak Hasani	CM	(England)	Doncaster	25 June 2002 (age 24)	2	0	–	–	Academy
31	Liam Ravenhill	CM	(Northern Ireland)			0	0	–	–	Academy
Forwards
9	Fejiri Okenabirhie	CF	(England)	Hendon	25 February 1996 (age 30)	5	2	–	–	Shrewsbury Town

=== Statistics ===
This includes any players featured in a match day squad in any competition.

As of 5 April 2021

No.	Pos	Nat	Player	Total		League One		FA Cup		League Cup		League Trophy		League One Play-offs	
No.	Pos	Nat	Player	Apps	Goals	Apps	Goals	Apps	Goals	Apps	Goals	Apps	Goals	Apps	Goals
1	GK	(England) ENG	Ellery Balcombe	13	0	11	0	2	0	0	0	0	0	0	0
2	DF	(England) ENG	Brad Halliday	44	1	34+2	1	4	0	1	0	3	0	0	0
3	DF	(England) ENG	Reece James	39	7	33+1	7	4	0	0	0	1	0	0	0
4	DF	(England) ENG	Tom Anderson	42	2	35	2	4	0	1	0	2	0	0	0
5	DF	(Wales) WAL	Joe Wright	38	2	27+3	2	4	0	1	0	2+1	0	0	0
6	MF	(England) ENG	Madger Gomes	23	4	11+8	3	0+1	0	1	1	2	0	0	0
7	FW	(England) ENG	Omar Bogle	10	2	9+1	2	0	0	0	0	0	0	0	0
8	MF	(Scotland) SCO	Scott Robertson	13	0	4+9	0	0	0	0	0	0	0	0	0
9	FW	(England) ENG	Fejiri Okenabirhie	38	12	22+8	9	4	1	1	1	3	1	0	0
10	MF	(Democratic Republic of the Congo) COD	Jason Lokilo	33	1	8+18	1	1+3	0	1	0	1+1	0	0	0
11	MF	(England) ENG	Jon Taylor	29	4	19+6	4	1	0	1	0	1+1	0	0	0
13	GK	(England) ENG	Louis Jones	12	0	8	0	1	0	0	0	3	0	0	0
14	MF	(Wales) WAL	Matt Smith	34	1	28+3	1	3	0	0	0	0	0	0	0
15	MF	(England) ENG	John Bostock	11	0	8+3	0	0	0	0	0	0	0	0	0
16	DF	(Northern Ireland) NIR	Danny Amos	12	0	4+3	0	1+2	0	0+1	0	1	0	0	0
17	MF	(England) ENG	Taylor Richards	39	6	23+10	5	2+1	1	0	0	2+1	0	0	0
18	MF	(England) ENG	Ed Williams	14	0	0+8	0	1+1	0	0+1	0	1+2	0	0	0
19	FW	(England) ENG	Tyreece John-Jules	14	3	9+2	3	1+1	0	0	0	1	0	0	0
20	MF	(England) ENG	Josh Sims	21	3	15+4	1	2	2	0	0	0	0	0	0
21	DF	(England) ENG	Andy Butler	16	0	13	0	2	0	0	0	1	0	0	0
22	MF	(Angola) ANG	Elliot Simões	9	0	7	0	1+1	0	0	0	0	0	0	0
24	DF	(England) ENG	Cameron John	37	2	20+10	2	2+1	0	1	0	3	0	0	0
26	MF	(England) ENG	James Coppinger	30	5	13+12	4	1	1	1	0	3	0	0	0
27	MF	(England) ENG	AJ Greaves	4	0	2+2	0	0	0	0	0	0	0	0	0
28	DF	(England) ENG	Branden Horton	4	0	3+1	0	0	0	0	0	0	0	0	0
29	MF	(England) ENG	Lirak Hasani	3	0	0+2	0	0	0	0+1	0	0	0	0	0
30	DF	(England) ENG	Ben Blythe	0	0	0	0	0	0	0	0	0	0	0	0
31	MF	(Northern Ireland) NIR	Liam Ravenhill	2	0	0	0	0+1	0	0	0	1	0	0	0
32	GK	(England) ENG	Ben Bottomley	0	0	0	0	0	0	0	0	0	0	0	0
Players who left the club during the season
1	GK	(England) ENG	Josef Bursik	11	0	10	0	0	0	1	0	0	0	0	0
7	MF	(England) ENG	Rayhaan Tulloch	2	0	2	0	0	0	0	0	0	0	0	0
8	MF	(England) ENG	Ben Whiteman	23	8	18	5	2	3	0	0	2+1	0	0	0
15	GK	(England) ENG	Joe Lumley	9	0	8	0	1	0	0	0	0	0	0	0
32	GK	(England) ENG	Toby King	0	0	0	0	0	0	0	0	0	0	0	0

==== Goals record ====
As of 5 April 2021.

Rank	No.	Po.	Name	League One	FA Cup	League Cup	League Trophy	Total
1	9	FW	Fejiri Okenabirhie	9	1	1	1	12
2	8	MF	Ben Whiteman	5	3	0	0	8
3	3	DF	Reece James	7	0	0	0	7
4	17	FW	Taylor Richards	5	1	0	0	6
5	26	MF	James Coppinger	4	1	0	0	5
6	11	FW	Jon Taylor	4	0	0	0	4
6	6	MF	Madger Gomes	3	0	1	0	4
8	19	FW	Tyreece John-Jules	3	0	0	0	3
8	20	MF	Josh Sims	1	2	0	0	3
10	24	DF	Cameron John	2	0	0	0	2
10	5	DF	Joe Wright	2	0	0	0	2
10	7	FW	Omar Bogle	2	0	0	0	2
10	4	DF	Tom Anderson	2	0	0	0	2
14	14	MF	Matt Smith	1	0	0	0	1
14	2	DF	Brad Halliday	1	0	0	0	1
14	10	MF	Jason Lokilo	1	0	0	0	1
-			Own goal	2	0	0	0	2
Total				52	6	2	1	61

==== Disciplinary record ====
As of 5 April 2021.

No.	Pos.	Name	League One			FA Cup			League Cup			League Trophy			Total		
No.	Pos.	Name	Booked	(yellow card) (yellow-red card)	Sent off (straight red)	Booked	(yellow card) (yellow-red card)	Sent off (straight red)	Booked	(yellow card) (yellow-red card)	Sent off (straight red)	Booked	(yellow card) (yellow-red card)	Sent off (straight red)	Booked	(yellow card) (yellow-red card)	Sent off (straight red)
1	GK	Ellery Balcombe	1	0	0	0	0	0	0	0	0	0	0	0	1	0	0
2	DF	Brad Halliday	5	0	0	0	0	0	1	0	0	0	0	0	6	0	0
3	DF	Reece James	6	0	0	0	0	0	0	0	0	0	0	0	6	0	0
4	DF	Tom Anderson	4	0	0	0	0	0	1	0	0	0	0	0	5	0	0
5	DF	Joe Wright	5	0	0	0	0	0	1	0	0	1	0	0	7	0	0
6	MF	Madger Gomes	1	0	0	0	0	0	0	0	0	0	0	0	1	0	0
7	FW	Omar Bogle	1	0	0	0	0	0	0	0	0	0	0	0	1	0	0
8	MF	Ben Whiteman	2	0	0	0	0	0	0	0	0	0	0	0	2	0	0
8	MF	Scott Robertson	1	0	0	0	0	0	0	0	0	0	0	0	1	0	0
9	FW	Fejiri Okenabirhie	2	0	0	0	0	0	0	0	0	0	0	0	2	0	0
10	MF	Jason Lokilo	1	0	0	0	0	0	0	0	0	0	0	0	1	0	0
11	FW	Jon Taylor	1	0	0	0	0	0	0	0	0	0	0	0	1	0	0
14	MF	Matt Smith	3	0	0	0	0	0	0	0	0	0	0	0	3	0	0
15	MF	John Bostock	1	0	0	0	0	0	0	0	0	0	0	0	1	0	0
16	DF	Danny Amos	0	0	0	0	0	0	0	0	0	1	0	0	1	0	0
17	MF	Taylor Richards	4	0	0	0	0	0	0	0	0	0	0	0	4	0	0
20	MF	Josh Sims	1	0	0	0	0	0	0	0	0	0	0	0	1	0	0
21	DF	Andy Butler	2	0	0	0	0	0	0	0	0	0	0	0	2	0	0
22	FW	Elliot Simões	1	0	0	0	0	0	0	0	0	0	0	0	1	0	0
24	DF	Cameron John	0	0	0	1	0	0	0	0	0	0	0	0	1	0	0
26	MF	James Coppinger	1	0	0	0	0	0	0	0	0	0	0	0	1	0	0
27	MF	AJ Greaves	2	0	0	0	0	0	0	0	0	0	0	0	2	0	0
Total			45	0	0	1	0	0	3	0	0	2	0	0	51	0	0

== Transfers ==
=== Transfers in ===
Date	Pos.	Nat.	Name	From	Fee	Ref.
2 August 2020	RW	(Democratic Republic of the Congo)	Jason Lokilo	(England) Crystal Palace	Free transfer	
27 August 2020	MF	(England)	Ed Williams	(England) Kidderminster Harriers	Free transfer	
28 August 2020	CB	(England)	Cameron John	(England) Wolverhampton Wanderers	Undisclosed	
11 September 2020	CB	(England)	Andy Butler	(England) Scunthorpe United	Free transfer	
1 October 2020	RB	(England)	Charlie Seaman	(England) AFC Bournemouth	Free transfer	
25 January 2021	CM	(Trinidad and Tobago)	John Bostock	(France) Toulouse	Free transfer	
29 January 2021	CF	(England)	Omar Bogle	(England) Charlton Athletic	Undisclosed	

=== Loans in ===
Date from	Pos.	Nat.	Name	From	Date until	Ref.
20 August 2020	GK	(England)	Josef Bursik	(England) Stoke City	End of season	
25 August 2020	MF	(England)	Taylor Richards	(England) Brighton & Hove Albion	End of season	
8 September 2020	CF	(England)	Tyreece John-Jules	(England) Arsenal	End of season	
11 September 2020	AM	(England)	Rayhaan Tulloch	(England) West Bromwich Albion	End of season	
16 October 2020	RW	(England)	Josh Sims	(England) Southampton	January 2021	
16 October 2020	DM	(Wales)	Matt Smith	(England) Manchester City	End of season	
20 November 2020	GK	(England)	Joe Lumley	(England) Queens Park Rangers	25 December 2020	
6 January 2021	GK	(England)	Ellery Balcombe	(England) Brentford	End of season	
6 January 2021	LW	(Angola)	Elliot Simões	(England) Barnsley	End of season	
27 January 2021	RW	(England)	Josh Sims	(England) Southampton	End of season	
30 January 2021	DM	(Scotland)	Scott Robertson	(Scotland) Celtic	End of season	

=== Loans out ===
Date from	Pos.	Nat.	Name	To	Date until	Ref.
7 August 2020	GK	(Republic of Ireland)	Ian Lawlor	(England) Oldham Athletic	30 June 2021	
17 September 2020	MF	(England)	AJ Greaves	(England) Gainsborough Trinity	17 October 2020	
21 September 2020	LB	(England)	Branden Horton	(England) Redditch United	January 2021	
1 October 2020	RB	(England)	Charlie Seaman	(England) Maidstone United	30 June 2021	
7 January 2021	CM	(England)	Lirak Hasani	(England) Gateshead	End of season	

=== Transfers out ===
Date	Pos.	Nat.	Name	To	Fee	Ref.
1 July 2020	CB	(England)	Alex Baptiste	(England) Bolton Wanderers	Released	
1 July 2020	CB	(Republic of Ireland)	Shane Blaney	(Republic of Ireland) Sligo Rovers	Released	
1 July 2020	CF	(England)	Rieves Boocock	(England) Cleethorpes Town	Released	
1 July 2020	CF	(England)	Devante Cole	(Scotland) Motherwell	Released	
1 July 2020	CF	(England)	Myron Gibbons	Unattached	Released	
1 July 2020	RW	(England)	Alex Kiwomya	(England) Chesterfield	Released	
1 July 2020	DF	(England)	Rian McLean	(England) Welling United	Released	
1 July 2020	LW	(Republic of Ireland)	Kieran Sadlier	(England) Rotherham United	Rejected contract	
1 July 2020	MF	(England)	Max Watters	(England) Crawley Town	Released	
1 July 2020	RM	(England)	Matty Blair	(England) Cheltenham Town	Rejected contract	
14 January 2021	CM	(England)	Benjamin Whiteman	(England) Preston North End	Undisclosed	

== Awards ==
=== PFA League One Player of the Month ===
Month	Player		Ref
January	(England) Ellery Balcombe	Nomination	

=== Sky Bet League One Player of the Month ===
Month	Player		Ref
September	(Spain) Madger Gomes	Winner	

=== Sky Bet League One Goal of the Month ===
Month	Player	Goal		Ref
September	(England) Tyreece John-Jules	63' vs Charlton Athletic, 19 September	Winner	

=== Sky Bet League One Manager of the Month ===
Month	Manager		Ref
September	(Jamaica) Darren Moore	Nomination	
January	(Jamaica) Darren Moore	Nomination	
