= Taylor Curran =

Taylor Curran may refer to:

- Taylor Curran, Canadian field hockey player
- Taylor Curran, English footballer
