= Anthony Greaves =

Anthony Greaves is the name of:

- AJ Greaves (born 2000), English footballer
- Tony Greaves, Baron Greaves (1942–2021), British politician
