= Taylor Richards =

English footballer (born 2000)

Personal information
- Full name: Taylor Jerome Richards
- Date of birth: 4 December 2000 (age 25)
- Place of birth: Hammersmith, England
- Height: 5 ft 11 in (1.80 m)
- Position: Midfielder

Youth career
- 2009–2015: Fulham
- 2015–2019: Manchester City
- 2019–2020: Brighton & Hove Albion

Senior career*
Years	Team	Apps	(Gls)
2019–2023	Brighton & Hove Albion	2	(0)
2020–2021	→ Doncaster Rovers (loan)	41	(10)
2022	→ Birmingham City (loan)	6	(0)
2022–2023	→ Queens Park Rangers (loan)	15	(0)
2023–2025	Queens Park Rangers	4	(0)
2024–2025	→ Cambridge United (loan)	5	(0)
2026	Crawley Town	19	(3)

International career
2017	England U17	3	(0)
- * Club domestic league appearances and goals as of 2 June 2026 (UTC)

Taylor Jerome Richards (born 4 December 2000) is an English professional footballer who plays as a midfielder.

He began his senior career at Brighton & Hove Albion, with loans to Doncaster Rovers of League One and Championship clubs Birmingham City and Queens Park Rangers, before joining QPR permanently in 2023. He spent the 2024–25 season with Cambridge United, but made just 5 league appearances, and his contract with QPR was terminated by mutual consent in September 2025. He joined Crawley Town for a six-month spell in January 2026.

Richards has represented England at under-17 level.

== Club career ==
=== Manchester City ===
Richards left Fulham to join Manchester City at the age of 14. During his final season at the club he scored a goal against Rochdale to help his side reach the quarter-final of the EFL Trophy.

=== Brighton & Hove Albion ===
In July 2019 Richards joined the academy of Brighton & Hove Albion for a transfer fee reported to be £2.5 million. He made his professional debut for Brighton on 25 September, in a 3–1 defeat at home against Aston Villa in the EFL Cup.

==== Doncaster Rovers (loan) ====
On 25 August 2020, Richards signed for Doncaster Rovers on a season long loan for the 2020–21 season. He made his debut four days later starting in the 3–2 away defeat against Blackburn Rovers in the EFL Cup. He made his league debut on 12 September, playing the whole of a 1–1 draw at home to MK Dons. Richards scored his first goal on 26 September, Doncaster's third in a 4–1 home victory over Bristol Rovers.

==== Return to Brighton ====
Richards made a Premier League matchday squad for the first time on 14 August in the opening game of the 2021–22 season; he remained as an unused substitute in the 2–1 away win over Burnley. He made his first appearance of the season ten days later, starting in the 2–0 away victory over Cardiff City in the EFL Cup second round. He made his Premier League debut on 28 August, coming on as a 73rd-minute substitute for Jakub Moder in the 2–0 home loss against Everton. Richards made his second Premier League appearance almost four months after his debut, coming on as a 84th-minute substitute replacing Enock Mwepu in the 1–0 home defeat against Wolverhampton Wanderers.

==== Birmingham City (loan) ====
Richards joined EFL Championship club Birmingham City on 7 January 2022 on loan for the remainder of the season. He suffered an injury during the medical with the club, falling into the edge of a board during a jumping test that looks at the fitness of a player's calf. Manager Lee Bowyer said "I have never heard anything like this. The players have done it a thousand times – it's just this season, he did it ten times and then he does it. It's crazy. I have never heard of a player getting injured in the medical." Richards made his first appearance in Birmingham's matchday squad on 26 February, but remained unused. He eventually made his debut on 12 March, as a 69th-minute substitute for Juninho Bacuna in the goalless draw at home to Hull City. According to the Birmingham Mail's reporter, "He looked very, very neat on the ball, not afraid to take possession and retain it in tight spots and also good at finding little angles around and in the box. He is a languid mover with good pace and plays with his head up, looking to bring others into the game." He made five more appearances (two starts) in what remained of the season.

=== Queens Park Rangers ===
On 22 July 2022, Richards joined EFL Championship club Queens Park Rangers on a season-long loan for the 2022–23 season with an option for a permanent deal. On 11 May 2023, Queens Park Rangers announced that Richards' move would be made permanent on a three-year deal.

Richards joined EFL League One side Cambridge United on a season-long loan deal in July 2024. In January 2025, with Richards having played just five league matches for the club due to injury, all of which as a substitute, Cambridge manager Garry Monk claimed that it would be best for Richards if parent club QPR were to recall him from his loan.

Richards left QPR after his contract was terminated by mutual consent on 1 September 2025.

=== Crawley Town ===
On 1 January 2026, Richards joined EFL League Two club Crawley Town on a six-month contract. He was released at the end of the 2025–26 season.

== International career ==
In February 2017 Richards made three appearances for the England under-17 team.

== Career statistics ==
As of match played 4 January 2025

Appearances and goals by club, season and competition
Club	Season	League			FA Cup		League Cup		Other		Total	
Club	Season	Division	Apps	Goals	Apps	Goals	Apps	Goals	Apps	Goals	Apps	Goals
Manchester City U21	2017–18	—			—		—		3 (Note: appearances in EFL Trophy)	0	3	0
Manchester City U21	2018–19	—			—		—		4	2	4	2
Manchester City U21	Total		—		—		—		7	2	7	2
Brighton & Hove Albion U21	2019–20	—			—		—		3	1	3	1
Brighton & Hove Albion	2019–20	Premier League	0	0	0	0	1	0	—		1	0
Brighton & Hove Albion	2021–22	Premier League	2	0	0	0	2	0	—		4	0
Brighton & Hove Albion	Total		2	0	0	0	3	0	—		5	0
Doncaster Rovers (loan)	2020–21	League One	41	10	3	1	1	0	3	0	48	11
Birmingham City (loan)	2021–22	Championship	6	0	0	0	—		—		6	0
Queen Park Rangers (loan)	2022–23	Championship	15	0	1	0	0	0	—		16	0
Queens Park Rangers	2023–24	Championship	4	0	0	0	1	0	—		5	0
Cambridge United (loan)	2024–25	League One	5	0	0	0	0	0	0	0	5	0
Career total			73	10	4	1	5	0	13	3	95	14
