= Madger Gomes =

Spanish footballer

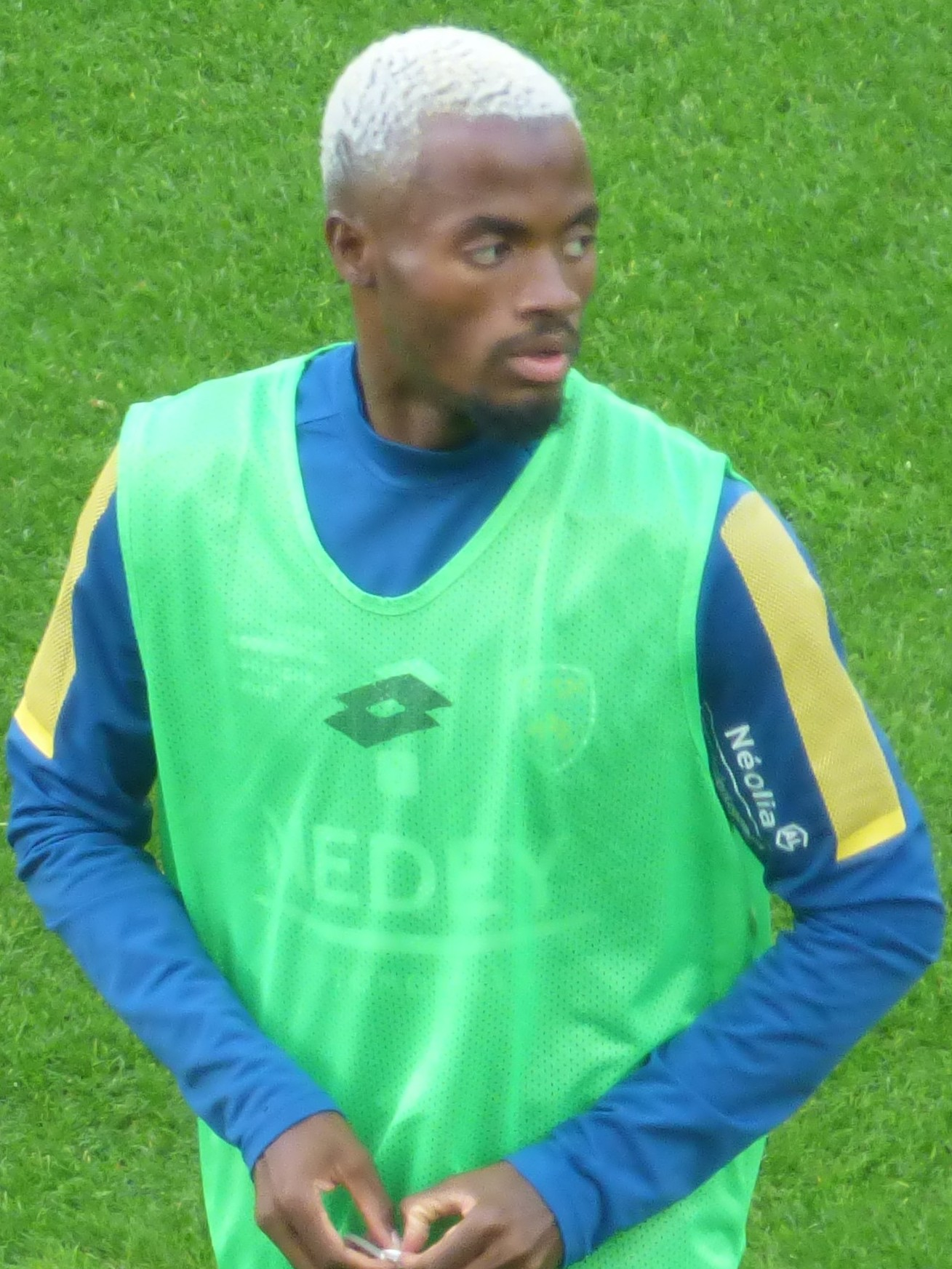
- Gomes in September 2018

Personal information
- Full name: Madger Antonio Gomes Ajú
- Date of birth: 1 February 1997 (age 29)
- Place of birth: Alicante, Spain
- Height: 1.80 m (5 ft 11 in)
- Position: Midfielder

Youth career
- Villarreal
- 2014–2017: Liverpool

Senior career*
Years	Team	Apps	(Gls)
2013	Villarreal B	1	(0)
2017–2018	Leeds United	0	(0)
2018	Sochaux	9	(0)
2019	NK Istra 1961	5	(0)
2019–2021	Doncaster Rovers	46	(3)
2021–2022	Crewe Alexandra	8	(0)
2022–2023	Fursan Hispania	27	(4)
2025	Kuala Lumpur City	0	(0)

International career
	Spain U15	4	(0)
2013–2014	Spain U17	6	(1)
2014	Spain U18	2	(0)
- * Club domestic league appearances and goals as of 17:18, 26 July 2025 (UTC)

Madger Antonio Gomes Ajú (born 1 February 1997) is a Spanish footballer who plays as a midfielder. He has also represented Spain U18s at international level.

He plays as a central midfielder but can also play as a winger or as a fullback.

== Club career ==
=== Early career ===
Gomes made his senior debut for Villarreal CF B in 2013, aged 16. Gomes joined Liverpool from Villarreal in the summer of 2014. After being unable to force his way into the first-team at Liverpool, he was released in 2017.

=== Leeds United ===
He signed for Leeds United on three-year deal on 27 June 2017 on a free transfer. On 9 August 2017, he made his first-team debut coming on in the 70th minute in the EFL Cup tie against Port Vale.

He made his first start for the club on 22 August 2017, starting in Leeds' 5–1 EFL Cup victory against Newport County.

=== Sochaux ===
On 11 June 2018, Gomes joined French side Sochaux in a permanent move from Leeds for an undisclosed fee.

=== NK Istra 1961 ===
In January 2019, he moved to NK Istra 1961.

=== Doncaster Rovers ===
It was announced on 20 June 2019 that Gomes had been signed on a two-year deal by English League One side Doncaster Rovers. He made 29 appearances without scoring in his first season at Doncaster, and then started the following season by scoring four times in the first five games (his debut goal was against Blackburn Rovers in the EFL Cup at Ewood Park on 29 August 2020), but then made a further 21 appearances without scoring.

=== Crewe Alexandra ===
On 4 September 2021, he signed a two-year deal with English League One side Crewe Alexandra, having joined as a free agent. His debut was delayed through illness; he eventually made his first Crewe start in a 2–0 win over Wigan Athletic in an EFL Trophy group stage tie at Gresty Road on 5 October 2021, and his league debut at Fleetwood Town on 16 October 2021. He was released by mutual consent in June 2022.

=== Fursan Hispania ===
After release from Crewe Alexandra, Madger Gomes signed for UAE First Division League club Fursan Hispania.

== International career ==
Gomes has represented Spain at international level including for Spain U18s. He is also eligible for the Guinea-Bissau national side.

== Career statistics ==
As of match played 1 December 2021

Appearances and goals by club, season and competition
Club	Season	League			FA Cup		League Cup		Other		Total	
Club	Season	Division	Apps	Goals	Apps	Goals	Apps	Goals	Apps	Goals	Apps	Goals
Leeds United	2017–18	Championship	0	0	0	0	2	0	0	0	2	0
FC Sochaux-Montbéliard	2018–19	Ligue 2	9	0	0	0	0	0	1	0	10	0
NK Istra 1961	2018–19	Croatian First Football League	5	0	0	0	0	0	0	0	5	0
Doncaster Rovers	2019–20	League One	23	0	3	0	0	0	3 (Note: Appearance/s in EFL Trophy)	0	29	0
Doncaster Rovers	2020–21	League One	23	3	1	0	1	1	2	0	27	4
Doncaster Rovers	Total		46	3	4	0	1	1	5	0	56	4
Crewe Alexandra	2021–22	League One	8	0	1	0	0	0	2	0	11	0
Career total			68	3	5	0	3	1	8	0	84	4
