= Akin Odimayo =

English footballer (born 1999)

Personal information
- Full name: Akinwale Joseph Odimayo
- Date of birth: 28 November 1999 (age 26)
- Place of birth: Camden, England
- Height: 6 ft 0 in (1.83 m)
- Position: Defender

Team information
- Current team: Crawley Town
- Number: 24

Youth career
- –2019: Reading

Senior career*
Years	Team	Apps	(Gls)
2019–2020	Reading	0	(0)
2019	→ Hungerford Town (loan)	8	(0)
2020	→ Waterford (loan)	4	(0)
2020–2022	Swindon Town	65	(0)
2022–2025	Northampton Town	89	(0)
2025–2026	Newport County	5	(0)
2026–	Crawley Town	18	(0)
- * Club domestic league appearances and goals as of 15:39, 11 October 2026 (UTC)

Akinwale Joseph Odimayo (born 28 November 1999) is an English professional footballer who plays as a defender for EFL League Two club Crawley Town.

== Career ==
Odimayo began his career with Reading, turning professional in July 2018, and making his senior debut for the club on 27 August 2019 in the EFL Cup. He moved on loan to Hungerford Town in September 2019, and on loan to Irish club Waterford in February 2020.

After being released by Reading at the end of the 2019–20 season, he signed for Swindon Town in August 2020. On 14 May 2021 it was announced that he had been offered a new contract. Odimayo went on trial with League One club Portsmouth but failed to earn a contract. On 3 August 2021 Odimayo signed a new one-year contract with Swindon Town.

He signed for Northampton Town in July 2022. Odimayo left the club at the end of the 2024–25 season.

On 24 October 2025, Odimayo signed a short-term contract with EFL League Two club Newport County. He made his debut on 25 October 2025 in the 3–0 League Two win against Harrogate Town as a second-half substitute. He left the club in January 2026 at the end of his short-term contract.

On 3 January 2026, Odimayo signed for fellow League Two club Crawley Town on an 18-month contract.

== Personal life ==
Born in England, Odimayo is of Nigerian descent.

== Career statistics ==
As of match played 10 October 2026

Appearances and goals by club, season and competition
Club	Season	League			National Cup		League Cup		Other		Total	
Club	Season	Division	Apps	Goals	Apps	Goals	Apps	Goals	Apps	Goals	Apps	Goals
Reading	2019–20	Championship	0	0	0	0	1	0	0	0	1	0
Hungerford Town (loan)	2019–20	National League South	8	0	0	0	0	0	0	0	8	0
Waterford (loan)	2020	LOI Premier Division	4	0	0	0	0	0	0	0	4	0
Swindon Town	2020–21	League One	30	0	1	0	1	0	2 (Note: Appearance(s) in the EFL Trophy.)	0	34	0
Swindon Town	2021–22	League Two	35	0	3	0	1	0	3	0	42	0
Swindon Town	Total		65	0	4	0	2	0	5	0	76	0
Northampton Town	2022–23	League Two	19	0	1	0	0	0	2	0	22	0
Northampton Town	2023–24	League One	29	0	1	0	1	0	1	0	32	0
Northampton Town	2024–25	League One	41	0	1	0	1	0	1	0	44	0
Northampton Town	Total		89	0	3	0	2	0	4	0	98	0
Newport County	2025–26	League Two	5	0	2	0	0	0	0	0	7	0
Crawley Town	2025–26	League Two	11	0	0	0	0	0	0	0	11	0
Crawley Town	2026–27	League Two	7	0	0	0	1	0	2	0	10	0
Crawley Town	Total		18	0	0	0	1	0	2	0	21	0
Career total			189	0	9	0	6	0	11	0	215	0

== Honours ==
Northampton Town

- EFL League Two promotion: 2022–23

Individual

- Swindon Town Supporters' Player of the Year: 2020–21
