= Joe Wright (footballer, born 1995) =

Footballer

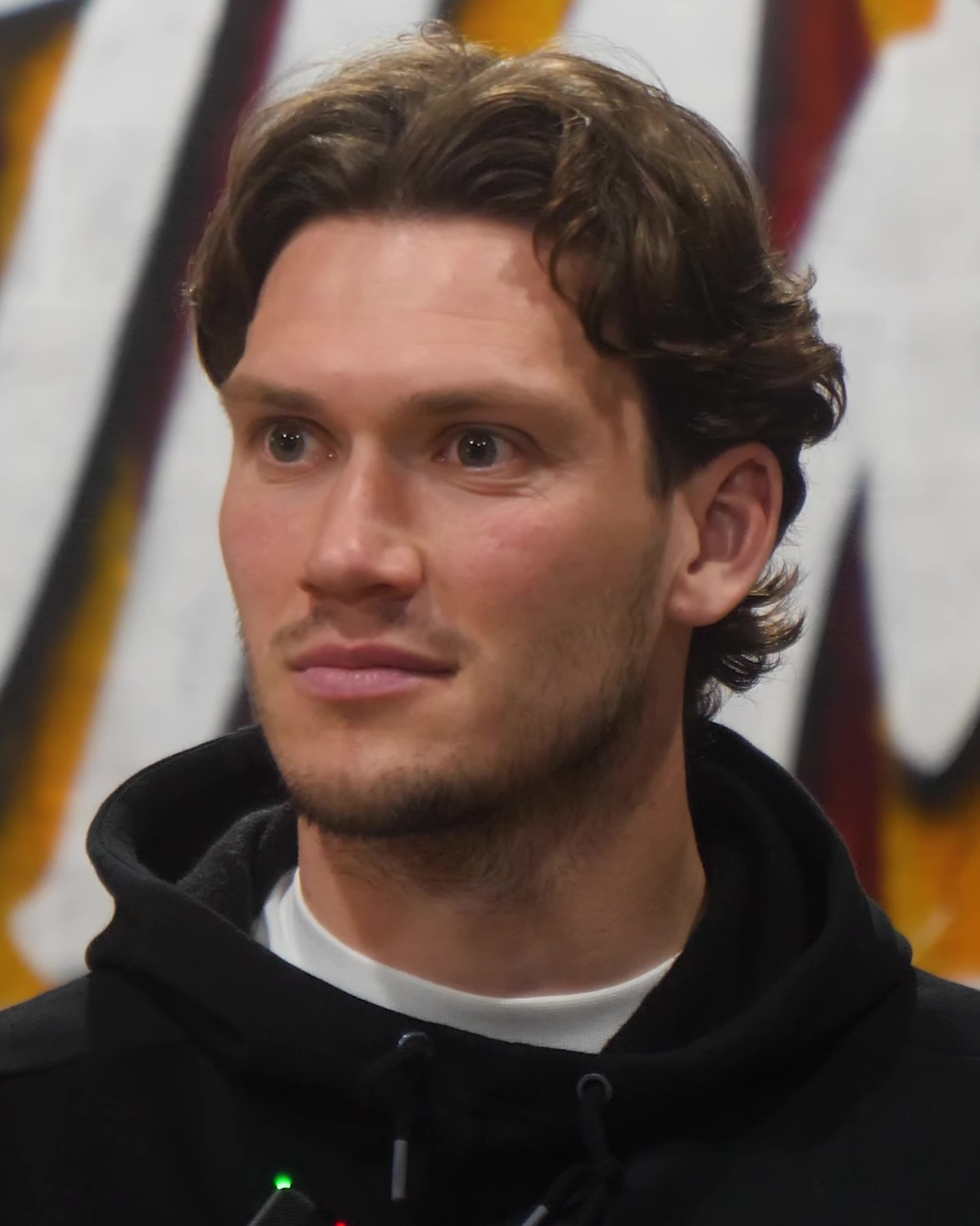
- Wright in 2025

Personal information
- Full name: Joseph Harris Wright
- Date of birth: 26 February 1995 (age 31)
- Place of birth: Monk Fryston, England
- Height: 6 ft 4 in (1.93 m)
- Position: Defender

Team information
- Current team: Dundee
- Number: 26

Youth career
- 2010–2013: Huddersfield Town

Senior career*
Years	Team	Apps	(Gls)
2013–2016	Huddersfield Town	0	(0)
2015–2016	→ Accrington Stanley (loan)	20	(0)
2016–2021	Doncaster Rovers	129	(4)
2022–2025	Kilmarnock	91	(10)
2025–2026	Bradford City	28	(3)
2026–	Dundee	3	(0)

International career
2015	Wales U21	2	(0)
- * Club domestic league appearances and goals as of 21 November 2026

Joseph Harris Wright (born 26 February 1995) is a professional footballer who plays as a defender for Scottish Premiership club Dundee. He is a former Wales under-21 international.

He was originally a professional with Huddersfield Town in England and has played for English clubs Accrington Stanley (on loan), Doncaster Rovers and Bradford City, as well as with Scottish club Kilmarnock.

Born in England, Wright has represented Wales at Under 21 level.

== Club career ==
=== Huddersfield Town ===
Wright joined Huddersfield Town at under-16 level in September 2010, and signed his first professional contract with the club in 2013. Wright featured on the bench for the Terriers in February 2015, before securing a further one-year contract to keep him at the club until June 2016.

==== Accrington Stanley (loan) ====
In the summer of 2015, Wright signed for Accrington Stanley on loan until January 2016 and made his professional debut against Luton Town in August as a substitute for Adam Buxton.

On 5 January 2016, Wright's loan deal was extended until the end of the season.

=== Doncaster Rovers ===
Following the conclusion of the 2015–16 season, Wright joined recently relegated Football League Two side Doncaster Rovers.

On the final day of the 2020–21 season, Wright damaged both his knee and ankle after falling awkwardly, the injury expected to rule him out for a period of up to nine months. Following the injury, it was confirmed that the club had been unable to reach an agreement with Wright with regards to a new contract and he would be departing the club, although Rovers would continue to offer him recovery and rehabilitation.

=== Kilmarnock ===
On 13 July 2022, after a year without a club, Wright joined Scottish Premiership side Kilmarnock on a one-year deal, having also had a trial with Heart of Midlothian.

In his debut season, Wright made 44 appearances across all competitions, scoring 5 goals. Notably, he scored twice in a 2–3 home defeat to Livingston on 4 November 2022 and added goals against Aberdeen and Rangers later in the season. His performances contributed to Kilmarnock's 10th-place finish in the Scottish Premiership, he extended his stay with the club by signing a two-year contract, keeping him at Rugby Park until June 2025.

Wright continued to be a key figure in the 2023–24 season, making 32 appearances and scoring 3 goals. He found the net in league matches against Hibernian on 16 September 2023, Dundee on 30 December 2023, and St Johnstone on 13 April 2024. His contributions helped Kilmarnock secure a 4th-place finish, earning qualification for the UEFA Europa League.

In the 2024–25 season, Wright has made 36 appearances across all competitions, scoring 2 goals. A highlight of the season was his decisive goal in the UEFA Europa Conference League on 15 August 2024, where he scored the only goal in a 1–0 away victory against Tromsø IL, securing a 3–2 aggregate win and advancing Kilmarnock to the play-off round against FC Copenhagen.

=== Bradford City ===
On 6 June 2025, Wright agreed to join newly promoted League One side Bradford City on a two-year deal.

He made his first appearance for the Bantams in the opening game of the 2025/26 EFL League One season in a 2–1 victory against Wycombe Wanderers.

Wright scored his first goal for the club on 30 August 2025 as the opener in a 3–2 win against fellow newly promoted side AFC Wimbledon.

=== Dundee ===
On 31 August 2026, Wright returned to the Scottish Premiership with Dundee on a two-year deal for an undisclosed fee. Wright made his Dundee debut on 6 September as a substitute away to Heart of Midlothian. He suffered an injured hamstring the following week in a bounce game against Falkirk, keeping him out for several weeks.

== International career ==
Wright has represented the Wales national under-21 football team.

== Career statistics ==
As of match played 21 November 2026

Appearances and goals by club, season and competition
Club	Season	League			National cup (Note: Includes FA Cup, Scottish Cup)		League cup (Note: Includes EFL Cup, Scottish League Cup)		Other		Total	
Club	Season	Division	Apps	Goals	Apps	Goals	Apps	Goals	Apps	Goals	Apps	Goals
Huddersfield Town	2014–15	Championship	0	0	0	0	0	0	—		0	0
Accrington Stanley (loan)	2015–16	League Two	20	0	2	0	0	0	0	0	22	0
Doncaster Rovers	2016–17	League Two	22	0	1	0	1	0	3 (Note: Appearances in the EFL Trophy)	0	27	0
Doncaster Rovers	2017–18	League One	33	0	1	0	3	0	1	0	38	0
Doncaster Rovers	2018–19	League One	14	2	1	0	2	0	1 (Note: Appearances in the EFL League One Play-offs)	0	18	2
Doncaster Rovers	2019–20	League One	20	0	3	0	0	0	3	1	26	1
Doncaster Rovers	2020–21	League One	31	2	4	0	1	0	3	0	39	2
Doncaster Rovers	Total		120	4	10	0	7	0	11	1	148	5
Kilmarnock	2022–23	Scottish Premiership	35	5	3	0	6	0	0	0	44	5
Kilmarnock	2023–24	Scottish Premiership	29	3	2	0	1	0	0	0	32	3
Kilmarnock	2024–25	Scottish Premiership	28	2	1	0	1	0	6 (Note: 2 appearances in UEFA Europa League, 4 appearances in UEFA Conference League)	0	36	2
Kilmarnock	Total		92	10	6	0	8	0	6	0	112	10
Bradford City	2025–26	League One	28	3	0	0	2	0	5 (Note: 3 appearances in EFL Trophy, 2 appearances in EFL League One play-offs)	0	35	3
Dundee	2026–27	Scottish Premiership	3	0	0	0	—		0	0	3	0
Career total			263	17	18	0	19	0	20	1	320	18
