= Ellery Balcombe =

English footballer (born 1999)

Personal information
- Full name: Ellery Ronald Balcombe
- Date of birth: 15 October 1999 (age 27)
- Place of birth: Watford, England
- Height: 1.90 m (6 ft 3 in)
- Position: Goalkeeper

Team information
- Current team: Brentford
- Number: 31

Youth career
- Bedford Panthers
- Stevenage
- –2018: Brentford

Senior career*
Years	Team	Apps	(Gls)
2018–	Brentford	0	(0)
2018–2019	→ Boreham Wood (loan)	8	(0)
2019–2020	→ Viborg FF (loan)	8	(0)
2021	→ Doncaster Rovers (loan)	15	(0)
2021–2022	→ Burton Albion (loan)	0	(0)
2022	→ Bromley (loan)	15	(0)
2022–2023	→ Crawley Town (loan)	10	(0)
2023	→ Bristol Rovers (loan)	8	(0)
2024–2025	→ St Mirren (loan)	21	(0)
2025	→ Motherwell (loan)	12	(0)

International career
2016–2017	England U18	3	(0)
2017–2018	England U19	9	(0)
2017–2019	England U20	6	(0)
- * Club domestic league appearances and goals as of 21:40, 15 September 2026 (UTC)

Ellery Ronald Balcombe (born 15 October 1999) is an English professional footballer who plays as a goalkeeper for Premier League club Brentford.

Balcombe is a product of the Brentford academy and B team. He turned professional in 2016 and was promoted into the first team squad in 2018, but has since played the majority of his career with the club away on loan. Balcombe was capped by England at youth level.

== Club career ==
=== Brentford ===
==== Youth years (2014–2018) ====
A goalkeeper, Balcombe began his career as a youth with Bedford Panthers and Stevenage. He began his affiliation with Brentford at the age of eight and progressed into the club's academy and its Elite U19 Education and Football Programme. He was a part of the U15 team which won the Junior Globe at the 2014 Milk Cup. While still an U16, Balcombe broke into the U18 team during the second half of the 2015–16 season, making six appearances. He also made four Development Squad appearances.

At the end of the 2015–16 season, Balcombe was promoted into the new Brentford B team and signed his first professional contract on 15 October 2016. Three weeks later, whiplash suffered in a car accident by second-choice goalkeeper Jack Bonham saw Balcombe win his maiden first team call up for a West London derby with Fulham. He remained an unused substitute during the 2–0 defeat. Balcombe played in the majority of the B team's matches during the 2016–17 season and helped the team to win the 2017 Kai Thor Cup.

Balcombe was the undisputed first choice goalkeeper for the B team during the 2017–18 season and made 30 appearances. He received his only first team call up of the season for a FA Cup third round match versus Notts County on 6 January 2018, in which he remained an unused substitute.

==== 2018–19 season and loan to Boreham Wood ====
In June 2018, Balcombe signed a new four-year contract and was promoted into the first team squad. On 6 August 2018, he joined National League club Boreham Wood on a youth loan until 1 January 2018. He made eight appearances for the club, before returning to Brentford early, for treatment on an injury suffered while on international duty in mid-October 2018. After regaining fitness, he won his first senior Brentford call up of the 2018–19 season for an FA Cup third round match versus Oxford United on 5 January 2019. Injuries suffered by goalkeepers saw Balcombe receive a number of call-ups into the first team squad during the final months of the season.

==== 2019–20 season and loan to Viborg FF ====
During the 2019–20 pre-season, Balcombe fell behind B team goalkeeper Patrik Gunnarsson in the first team goalkeeping pecking order and he instead travelled with the B team on its training camp in Cheshire. On 2 September 2019, Balcombe joined Danish 1st Division club Viborg FF on loan until the end of the 2019–20 season. He was sent off for the first time in his career on his eighth and what proved to be final appearance for the club, a 2–1 defeat to HB Køge on 2 November 2019. The loan was terminated during the winter break, due to a season-ending back injury, which required surgery.

==== 2020–21 season and loan to Doncaster Rovers ====
Balcombe returned fit for the 2020–21 pre-season and owing to the departure of Patrik Gunnarsson on loan, he served as third-choice goalkeeper behind David Raya and Luke Daniels. He was an unused substitute during two early regular season matches. Balcombe signed a new 4 1/2-year contract on 6 January 2021 and later that day, he joined League One club Doncaster Rovers on loan until the end of the 2020–21 season. He immediately assumed a starting role and one of his saves during a 4–0 FA Cup fourth round defeat to West Ham United on 23 January was nominated for the competition's Save of the Round award. One week later, two penalty saves and a man of the match performance in a 1–0 win over Lincoln City saw Balcombe named in the League One Team of the Week. Balcombe's January 2021 performances in league matches saw him nominated for the PFA Fans' League One Player of the Month award. He finished his spell with 17 appearances and in his absence, Brentford were promoted to the Premier League.

==== 2021–22 season and loans to Burton Albion and Bromley ====
On 29 June 2021, Balcombe joined League One club Burton Albion on loan for the duration of the 2021–22 season. Unable to dislodge first-choice goalkeeper Ben Garratt, he made just three EFL Trophy appearances before the termination of the loan on 4 January 2022. On 31 January 2022, Balcombe joined National League club Bromley on loan until the end of the 2021–22 season. He was signed as a replacement for departed backup goalkeeper Reice Charles-Cook. Initially appearing only in FA Trophy matches, Balcombe displaced first-choice goalkeeper Mark Cousins in the league lineup in March 2022. His 19th and final appearance for the club came in the 1–0 2022 FA Trophy Final victory over Wrexham on 22 May 2022.

==== 2022–23 season and loans to Crawley Town and Bristol Rovers ====
On 30 July 2022, Balcombe joined League Two club Crawley Town on a season-long loan. He started in the club's opening 2022–23 fixture versus Carlisle United later that day, but was substituted due to injury at half-time during the 1–0 defeat. He returned to match play on 29 October 2022 and made 11 further appearances before being recalled on 17 January 2023. Two days later, Balcombe joined League One club Bristol Rovers on loan until the end of the season. He made eight appearances during an injury-affected spell.

==== 2023–24 season ====
Following involvement in Brentford's 2023–24 pre-season matchday squads, Balcombe began the regular season as third-choice goalkeeper, behind new signing Mark Flekken and the departed David Raya's deputy Thomas Strakosha. On 26 August 2023, Balcombe was included in a competitive matchday squad for the first time since September 2020, when he remained an unused substitute during a 1–1 Premier League draw with Crystal Palace. Three days later, he made his competitive debut for the club with a start in a EFL Cup second round match versus Newport County. With the score 1–1 after extra time, Balcombe saved two penalties in the resulting shoot-out, helping Brentford to victory. On 3 October 2023, Balcombe signed a new four-year contract, with a one-year option. He was an unused substitute on five occasions during the 2023–24 season.

==== 2024–2026 and Scottish Premiership loans ====
On 24 May 2024, Balcombe joined Scottish Premiership club St Mirren on loan for the duration of the 2024–25 season. After making 26 appearances and playing European football for the first time in his career, Balcombe was recalled on 5 January 2025. On 23 January, he joined Scottish Premiership club Motherwell on loan until the end of the season and made 12 appearances.

Balcombe made one substitute appearance during the 2025–26 pre-season period and remained with Brentford for the entire season. He was an unused substitute during three regular season matches. Balcombe made one friendly appearance during the 2026–27 pre-season period and in August 2026 he signed a new three-year contract, with the option of a further year. Balcombe made his second senior Brentford appearance with a start in a 2–1 EFL Cup third round victory over Reading on 15 September 2026.

== International career ==
Balcombe was capped by England at U18, U19 and U20 level. He was a part of the England squads at the 2018 UEFA European U19 Championship and the 2017 and 2019 editions of the Toulon Tournament. He was uncapped at U21 level, but was an unused substitute in a number of matches and was called into the 2018 Toulon Tournament group as a standby and training support. While on U21 duty in October 2019, Balcombe trained with the full England squad.

== Personal life ==
Balcombe is of Saint Vincent and the Grenadines descent through his parents. He attended Castle Lower School in Bedford and won the Outstanding Achiever Award at the 2017 Bedford Sports Awards. Balcombe is a Brentford supporter.

== Career statistics ==
As of match played 15 September 2026

Appearances and goals by club, season and competition
Club	Season	League			National cup (Note: Includes FA Cup)		League cup (Note: Includes EFL Cup, Scottish League Cup)		Europe		Other		Total	
Club	Season	Division	Apps	Goals	Apps	Goals	Apps	Goals	Apps	Goals	Apps	Goals	Apps	Goals
Brentford	2016–17	Championship	0	0	0	0	0	0	—		—		0	0
Brentford	2017–18	Championship	0	0	0	0	0	0	—		—		0	0
Brentford	2018–19	Championship	0	0	0	0	—		—		—		0	0
Brentford	2020–21	Championship	0	0	—		0	0	—		—		0	0
Brentford	2023–24	Premier League	0	0	0	0	1	0	—		—		1	0
Brentford	2025–26	Premier League	0	0	0	0	0	0	—		—		0	0
Brentford	2026–27	Premier League	0	0	0	0	1	0	—		—		1	0
Brentford	Total		0	0	0	0	2	0	—		—		2	0
Boreham Wood (loan)	2018–19	National League	8	0	0	0	—		—		0	0	8	0
Viborg FF (loan)	2019–20	Danish 1st Division	8	0	0	0	—		—		—		8	0
Doncaster Rovers (loan)	2020–21	League One	15	0	2	0	—		—		—		17	0
Burton Albion (loan)	2021–22	League One	0	0	0	0	0	0	—		3 (Note: Appearances in EFL Trophy)	0	3	0
Bromley (loan)	2021–22	National League	15	0	—		—		—		4 (Note: Appearances in FA Trophy)	0	19	0
Crawley Town (loan)	2022–23	League Two	10	0	1	0	1	0	—		0	0	12	0
Bristol Rovers (loan)	2022–23	League One	8	0	—		—		—		—		8	0
St Mirren (loan)	2024–25	Scottish Premiership	21	0	—		1	0	4 (Note: Appearances in UEFA Conference League)	0	—		26	0
Motherwell (loan)	2024–25	Scottish Premiership	12	0	—		—		—		—		12	0
Career total			97	0	3	0	4	0	4	0	7	0	115	0

== Honours ==
England U20

- Toulon Tournament: 2017

England U18

- International Trophy: 2016

Bromley

- FA Trophy: 2021–22
