= Toby Holland =

English footballer

Personal information
- Full name: Toby Steven Holland
- Date of birth: November 2001 (age 24–25)
- Place of birth: Cheltenham, England
- Position: Midfielder

Team information
- Current team: Bishop's Cleeve

Youth career
- Swindon Town

Senior career*
Years	Team	Apps	(Gls)
2019–2021	Swindon Town	0	(0)
2021	Evesham United	3	(0)
2021–2022	Highworth Town	17	(3)
2022–2023	Cinderford Town	15	(2)
2023–	Bishop's Cleeve	0	(0)
- * Club domestic league appearances and goals as of 12:25, 2 February 2023 (UTC)

Toby Steven Holland is an English professional footballer who plays as a midfielder for Bishop's Cleeve.

== Career ==
On 13 November 2019, after progressing through Swindon Town's academy, Holland made his debut for the club in a 1–0 EFL Trophy loss against Bristol Rovers. On 7 January 2021, Holland left the club following the expiration of his contract.

In February 2022, Holland signed for Southern Football League Division One Central club Cinderford Town having previously played for Evesham United and Highworth Town following his release from Swindon. In January 2023, Holland signed for league rivals Bishop's Cleeve.

== Career statistics ==
As of 14 December 2019.

Appearances and goals by club, season and competition
Club	Season	League			FA Cup		League Cup		Other		Total	
Club	Season	Division	Apps	Goals	Apps	Goals	Apps	Goals	Apps	Goals	Apps	Goals
Swindon Town	2019–20	League Two	0	0	0	0	0	0	1 (Note: Appearance(s) in EFL Trophy)	0	1	0
Career total			0	0	0	0	0	0	1	0	1	0
