= Reece James (footballer, born 1993) =

English footballer (born 1993)

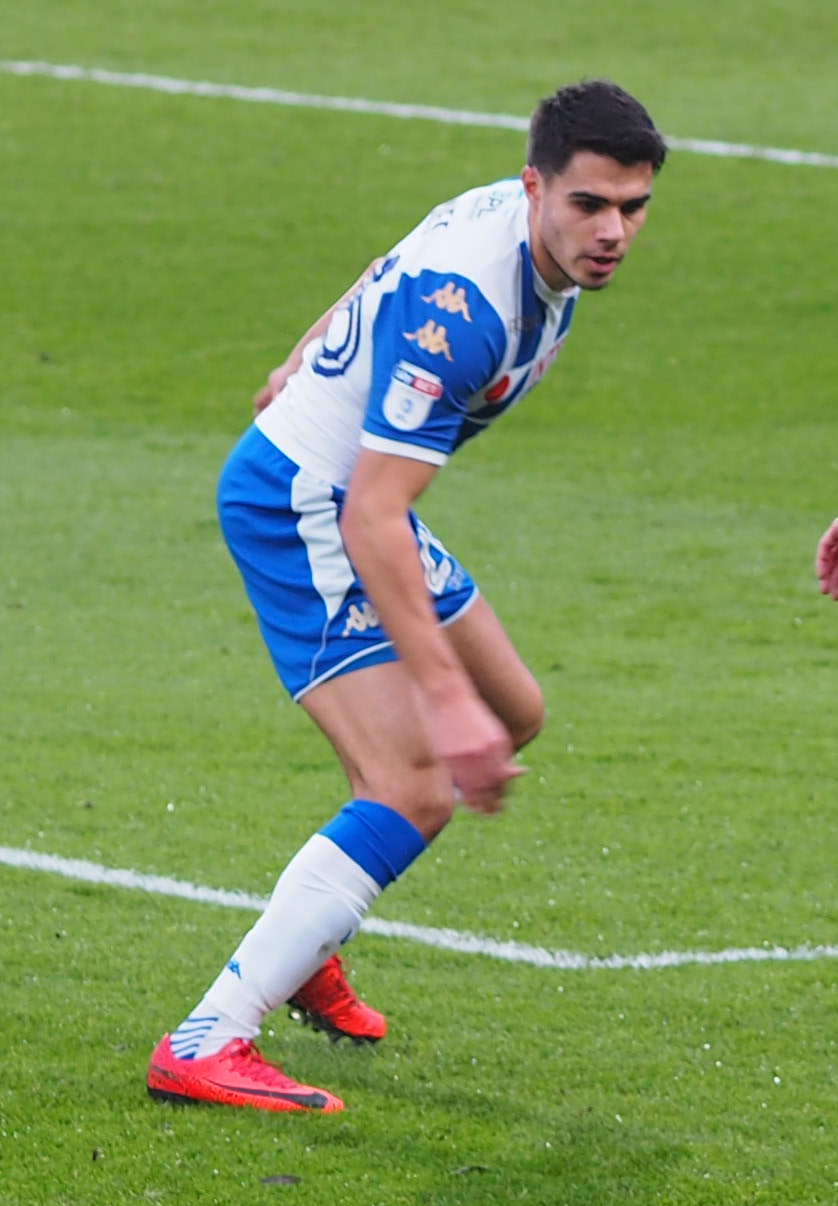
- James playing for Wigan Athletic in 2018

Personal information
- Date of birth: 7 November 1993 (age 32)
- Place of birth: Bacup, England
- Height: 6 ft 0 in (1.82 m)
- Position: Defender

Team information
- Current team: Sheffield Wednesday
- Number: 33

Youth career
- Rossendale United
- Blackburn Rovers
- Preston North End
- 2012–2013: Manchester United

Senior career*
Years	Team	Apps	(Gls)
2013–2015	Manchester United	0	(0)
2013	→ Carlisle United (loan)	1	(0)
2014–2015	→ Rotherham United (loan)	7	(0)
2015	→ Huddersfield Town (loan)	6	(1)
2015–2018	Wigan Athletic	48	(1)
2018–2019	Sunderland	27	(0)
2019–2021	Doncaster Rovers	70	(9)
2021–2023	Blackpool	17	(0)
2022–2023	→ Sheffield Wednesday (loan)	25	(0)
2023–2024	Sheffield Wednesday	8	(0)
2024–2026	Rotherham United	80	(3)
2026–	Sheffield Wednesday	9	(0)
- * Club domestic league appearances and goals as of 21:50, 27 October 2026 (UTC)

Reece James (born 7 November 1993) is an English professional footballer who plays for EFL League One side Sheffield Wednesday. His usual position is as a left-back, but he also occasionally plays in midfield.

After spending time as a youth player with Rossendale United, Blackburn Rovers and Preston North End, James followed his brother Matty to Manchester United in 2012; however, he failed to break into the first team, and after loan spells with Carlisle United, Rotherham United and Huddersfield Town, he made a permanent move to Wigan Athletic in 2015. After three years with Wigan, James joined Sunderland on a free transfer at the end of the 2017–18 season. He then spent two years with Doncaster Rovers.

== Career ==
Born in Bacup, Lancashire, James began his football career as a youth player with local club Rossendale United, and spent time with Blackburn Rovers and Preston North End before signing for Manchester United in July 2012.

=== Manchester United ===
He signed for Carlisle on a half-season loan contract in July 2013, and made his professional debut on the opening day of the 2013–14 season in Carlisle's 5–1 home defeat to Leyton Orient. However, he suffered an injury shortly before half time in Carlisle's penalty shoot-out victory against Blackburn Rovers in the League Cup on 7 August, and returned to Manchester United on 24 September 2013.

After returning to Manchester United, James was ever-present in the club's reserve team for the remainder of the season, and his performances led to a nomination for the Denzil Haroun Reserve Player of the Year award, ultimately losing to Saidy Janko. He made his first-team debut in the opening match of the club's pre-season tour of the United States on 23 July 2014, and scored twice from a left-wing-back role as Manchester United beat the LA Galaxy 7–0. On 26 August 2014, he made his only United first-team appearance in the League Cup defeat to Milton Keynes Dons.

On 26 November 2014, James was sent on loan to Rotherham United for two months. After eight appearances, including one in the FA Cup, he returned to Manchester United on 26 January 2015. On 26 March, he joined Huddersfield Town on loan until the end of the 2014–15 season. He made his debut in the 1–1 draw against Sheffield Wednesday at Hillsborough on 4 April 2015. His first goal for the club came in the 4–4 draw with Derby County at the John Smith's Stadium on 18 April 2015, when he scored directly from a corner to give Town a 3–1 lead.

=== Wigan Athletic ===
On 21 July 2015, James joined Wigan Athletic on a three-year deal for an undisclosed fee. After being largely ever-present for the first half of the season, an injury suffered in a 3–1 victory over Chesterfield, in which James scored his first goal for the club, led to him missing the remainder of the 2015–16 season and the majority of the following season.

He was released by Wigan at the end of the 2017–18 season.

=== Sunderland ===
He subsequently signed a one-year deal with Sunderland on 2 July 2018.

=== Doncaster Rovers ===
James signed for Doncaster Rovers on a two-year deal on 19 June 2019 for an undisclosed fee. On 5 October, he scored his first goal for the club in a 2–1 defeat against Portsmouth.

=== Blackpool ===
After two years at Doncaster, James joined Championship club Blackpool on 1 July 2021 on a three-year deal.

==== Sheffield Wednesday (loan) ====
On 7 July 2022, James joined Sheffield Wednesday on loan for the duration of the season. He made his debut against Sunderland in the EFL Cup on 10 August 2022. James was shown a red card in his first start for the club against Peterborough United. His first goal for the club came against Peterborough United in the second leg of the play-off semi-final.

=== Permanent move to Sheffield Wednesday ===
On 30 June 2023, James joined Sheffield Wednesday for an undisclosed fee. He made his permanent debut against Southampton on 4 August 2023 coming off the bench. On 17 May 2024, it was confirmed he would be released following the expiration of his contract.

=== Return to Rotherham United ===
On 22 May 2024, it was confirmed James would return to Rotherham United on a two-year deal. On 8 May 2026 Rotherham announced he was being released after the team's relegation to EFL League Two.

=== Return to Sheffield Wednesday ===
On 24 August 2026, James returned to Sheffield Wednesday, signing a one-year contract after a successful trial. He made his return the following day in the EFL Cup, starting the game against Wolverhampton Wanderers. After a strong return to the club, he was voted the clubs October player of the month.

== Personal life ==
James' father, Linton, played non-league football for Bacup Borough and later worked as assistant manager of the club. He attended Fearns Community Sports College. His brother, Matty, who is also a product of the Manchester United academy, currently plays for Wrexham in the EFL League One.

== Career statistics ==
As of 27 October 2026

Appearances and goals by club, season and competition
Club	Season	League			FA Cup		League Cup		Continental		Other		Total	
Club	Season	Division	Apps	Goals	Apps	Goals	Apps	Goals	Apps	Goals	Apps	Goals	Apps	Goals
Manchester United	2013–14	Premier League	0	0	0	0	0	0	0	0	–		0	0
Manchester United	2014–15	Premier League	0	0	0	0	1	0	–		–		1	0
Manchester United	Total		0	0	0	0	1	0	0	0	–		1	0
Carlisle United (loan)	2013–14	League One	1	0	–		1	0	–		–		2	0
Rotherham United (loan)	2014–15	Championship	7	0	1	0	–		–		–		8	0
Huddersfield Town (loan)	2014–15	Championship	6	1	–		–		–		–		6	1
Wigan Athletic	2015–16	League One	26	1	1	0	1	0	–		1 (Note: Appearance in the EFL Trophy)	0	29	1
Wigan Athletic	2016–17	Championship	0	0	0	0	0	0	–		—		0	0
Wigan Athletic	2017–18	League One	22	0	4	0	1	0	–		1	0	28	0
Wigan Athletic	Total		48	1	5	0	2	0	–		2	0	57	1
Sunderland	2018–19	League One	27	0	2	0	1	0	–		4	0	34	0
Doncaster Rovers	2019–20	League One	27	2	2	0	1	0	–		2	0	32	2
Doncaster Rovers	2020–21	League One	43	7	4	0	0	0	–		1	0	48	7
Doncaster Rovers	Total		70	9	6	0	1	0	–		3	0	80	9
Blackpool	2021–22	Championship	17	0	0	0	2	0	–		–		19	0
Blackpool	2022–23	Championship	0	0	0	0	0	0	–		–		0	0
Blackpool	Total		17	0	0	0	2	0	–		0	0	19	0
Sheffield Wednesday (loan)	2022–23	League One	25	0	2	0	2	0	–		5 (Note: Appearance(s) in League One Play-offs & Football League Trophy)	1	34	1
Sheffield Wednesday	2023–24	Championship	8	0	2	0	1	0	–		0	0	11	0
Rotherham United	2024–25	League One	43	2	0	0	2	0	–		5	0	50	2
Rotherham United	2025–26	League One	37	1	1	0	2	0	–		3	1	43	2
Rotherham United	Total		80	3	1	0	4	0	–		8	1	93	4
Sheffield Wednesday	2026–27	League One	9	0	0	0	1	0	–		2	0	12	0
Career total			298	14	19	0	18	0	0	0	24	2	359	16

== Honours ==
Wigan Athletic

- Football League / EFL League One: 2015–16, 2017–18

Sunderland

- EFL Trophy runner-up: 2018–19

Sheffield Wednesday

- EFL League One play-offs: 2023
