= John Pritchard (footballer) =

English footballer (born 1995)

Personal information
- Full name: John Vincent Pritchard
- Date of birth: 29 September 1995 (age 31)
- Place of birth: Manchester, England
- Positions: Defender; midfielder

Team information
- Current team: Glossop North End (dual registration from Witton Albion)

Youth career
- Oldham Athletic

Senior career*
Years	Team	Apps	(Gls)
2013–2014	Oldham Athletic	1	(0)
2014	FC United of Manchester	1	(0)
2015	Trafford	11	(2)
2015	New Mills		
2015–2016	Ramsbottom United		
2017–2018	Ashton United		
2017	→ Stockport Town (loan)		
2017	→ West Didsbury & Chorlton (loan)		
2018–2019	Chester	13	(2)
2019	→ Buxton (loan)	18	(4)
2019–2020	Ashton United	19	(1)
2020–2021	Wythenshawe Town		
2021–2022	Matlock Town		
2022	Radcliffe	11	(0)
2022–2023	Cheadle Town		
2023	Stalybridge Celtic	0	(0)
2023–	Witton Albion	0	(0)
2023–	→ Glossop North End (dual-registration)	0	(0)
- * Club domestic league appearances and goals as of 11:03, 18 October 2023 (UTC)

John Vincent Pritchard (born 29 September 1995) is an English professional footballer who plays as a defender or midfielder for Glossop North End on dual registration from Witton Albion.

== Playing career ==
Pritchard was in his youth a trainee by Manchester United, before joined in April 2012 to Oldham Athletic. He made his debut for Oldham Athletic on 21 December 2013 in a 2–0 defeat to Colchester United at Boundary Park, he came on as a 79th-minute substitute for Adam Rooney. After two seasons was released and joined in August 2014 to FC United of Manchester of the Northern Premier League Premier Division.

Limited opportunities at FCUM saw him drop one division to Trafford at the turn of the year. Further moves around the Northern Premier League include New Mills in October 2015, Ramsbottom United in November 2015, Northwich Victoria in July 2016 and Ashton United at the start of the 2017–18 season. While at Ashton United, he spent time on loans with Stockport Town and West Didsbury & Chorlton during autumn 2017, to regain fitness after weeks out with a broken ankle.

On 25 June 2018, Pritchard joined National League North side Chester. On 30 November 2018, Pritchard moved on loan to Buxton for 28 days to find more regular football. On 31 December, the loan was extended to the end of the season.

In June 2019 he rejoined Ashton United. In July 2023, after spells with Wythenshawe Town, Matlock Town, Radcliffe and Cheadle Town, he signed for Northern Premier League Division One West side Stalybridge Celtic for the 2023–24 season. He joined Witton Albion in October 2023, immediately joining Glossop North End on a dual-registration basis.

== Statistics ==
Appearances and goals by club, season and competition
Club	Season	League			FA Cup		League Cup		Other		Total	
Club	Season	Division	Apps	Goals	Apps	Goals	Apps	Goals	Apps	Goals	Apps	Goals
Oldham Athletic	2013–14	League One	1	0	0	0	0	0	0	0	1	0
Chester	2018–19	National League North	13	2	1	2	—		0	0	14	4
Buxton	2018–19	NPL Premier Division	18	4	0	0	—		0	0	18	4
Ashton United	2019–20	NPL Premier Division	16	0	2	0	—		0	0	18	0
Ashton United	2020–21	NPL Premier Division	3	1	2	0	—		4 (Note: Appearance(s) in FA Trophy)	0	9	1
Ashton United	Total		19	1	4	0	0	0	4	0	27	1
Radcliffe	2021–22	NPL Premier Division	11	0	0	0	—		0	0	11	0
Career total			62	7	5	2	0	0	4	0	71	9
