= Taylor Curran (footballer) =

English footballer

Personal information
- Full name: Taylor Curran
- Date of birth: 7 July 2000 (age 26)
- Place of birth: Redbridge, England
- Height: 1.83 m (6 ft 0 in)
- Position: Defender

Team information
- Current team: Ferreiras

Youth career
- Southend United

Senior career*
Years	Team	Apps	(Gls)
2018–2019	Southend United	0	(0)
2018–2019	→ Braintree Town (loan)	1	(0)
2019–2021	Swindon Town	13	(1)
2021–2022	Maidstone United	5	(1)
2022	→ Haringey Borough (loan)	3	(0)
2022	→ Welling United (loan)	4	(0)
2022–2024	Welling United	17	(1)
2024	Cheshunt	11	(1)
2024–2025	Brentwood Town	17	(0)
2025–	Ferreiras	0	(0)
- * Club domestic league appearances and goals as of 09:16, 25 September 2025 (UTC)

Taylor Curran (born 7 July 2000) is an English footballer who plays as a defender for Ferreiras.

== Career ==
Curran began his career with Southend United, signing a 2-year professional contract in March 2018. In November 2018 he joined National League side Braintree Town on loan, making 2 appearances for the club in all competitions.

He signed for Swindon Town in January 2019, on a 2 1/2-year contract. He made his debut for Swindon on 4 May 2019.

On 9 July 2021, Curran joined National League South side Maidstone United.

In 2022, Curran spent time on loan at Haringey Borough and then Welling United.

Having spent the end of the season with the club on loan, Curran returned permanently to Welling United in July 2022.

Following a short spell playing in the United Arab Emirates, Curran returned to England and joined Cheshunt in June 2024. In November 2024, he joined Isthmian League North Division side Brentwood Town. On 19 July 2025, the club announced he was leaving to join a team in Portugal. On 24 September 2025, Ferreiras announced Curran had joined the club ahead of the new season.

== Career statistics ==
As of match played 1 May 2021

Appearances and goals by club, season and competition
Club	Season	League			FA Cup		League Cup		Other		Total	
Club	Season	Division	Apps	Goals	Apps	Goals	Apps	Goals	Apps	Goals	Apps	Goals
Southend United	2018–19	League One	0	0	0	0	0	0	0	0	0	0
Braintree Town (loan)	2018–19	National League	1	0	0	0	0	0	1	0	2	0
Swindon Town	2018–19	League Two	1	0	0	0	0	0	0	0	1	0
Swindon Town	2019–20	League Two	2	0	0	0	0	0	2	0	4	0
Swindon Town	2020–21	League One	10	1	0	0	0	0	3	0	13	1
Swindon Town	Total		13	1	0	0	0	0	5	0	18	1
Career total			14	1	0	0	0	0	6	0	20	1

== Honours ==
Swindon Town

- EFL League Two: 2019–20
