= AJ Greaves =

English association football player (born 2000)

Personal information
- Full name: A.J. Anthony Junior Nelson Manuelle Greaves
- Date of birth: 17 November 2000 (age 25)
- Place of birth: Sheffield, England
- Height: 5 ft 10 in (1.77 m)
- Position: Midfielder

Youth career
- Doncaster Rovers

Senior career*
Years	Team	Apps	(Gls)
2019–2022	Doncaster Rovers	11	(0)
2019	→ Gainsborough Trinity (loan)	8	(0)
2021	→ Redditch United (loan)		
2022	→ York City (loan)	4	(0)
2022–2023	York City	5	(0)
2023	→ Spennymoor Town (loan)	5	(0)
2023	Marske United	0	(0)
2023–2024	Shirebrook Town		
2024–2025	Sheffield	44	(1)
2025–	Ilkeston Town	0	(0)
- * Club domestic league appearances and goals as of 12:29, 20 June 2025 (UTC)

A.J. Anthony Junior Nelson Manuelle Greaves (born 17 November 2000) is an English professional footballer who plays as a midfielder for Northern Premier League Premier Division club Ilkeston Town.

== Career ==
Born in Sheffield, Greaves was captain of the Doncaster Rovers under-18 team before turning professional in 2019. He made his senior debut for Doncaster on 8 October 2019 in the EFL Trophy, having joined Gainsborough Trinity on loan earlier that month.

His contract was extended by Doncaster at the end of 2019–20 season, until 2021. He made his full league debut in January 2021, and said he was hoping to replace Ben Whiteman, who had left the club, in the team. In April 2021, his contract was extended for a further year.

On 15 October 2021, he was sent out on loan to Southern Football League Premier Division Central side Redditch United on a youth loan. On 4 February 2022, Greaves joined National League North side York City on loan for the remainder of the 2021–22 season.

Greaves was released by Doncaster at the end of the 2021–22 season.

He returned to York City on a permanent contract in July 2022. He moved on loan to Spennymoor Town in March 2023. He was released by York after one season with the club, however was invited back for pre-season.

In June 2025, Greaves joined Northern Premier League Premier Division side Ilkeston Town following a season with Sheffield.
