= 2018–19 Doncaster Rovers F.C. season =

Doncaster Rovers F.C.
2018–19 season
- Chairman: David Blunt
- Manager: Grant McCann
- Stadium: Keepmoat Stadium
- League One: 6th
- FA Cup: Fifth round (eliminated by Crystal Palace)
- EFL Cup: Second round (eliminated by Blackpool)
- EFL Trophy: Group stage
- Top goalscorer: League: John Marquis (21); All: John Marquis (25)
- Highest home attendance: 14,010 vs Crystal Palace (FA Cup, 17 February '19)
- Lowest home attendance: 1,420 vs Grimsby Town (EFL Trophy, 9 October '18)
- Average home league attendance: 8,098
- Biggest win: 7–0 vs Chorley (FA Cup, 20 November '18)
- Biggest defeat: 0–4 vs Fleetwood Town (6 October '18); 0–4 vs Luton Town (23 March '19)
Home colours	Away colours

The 2018–19 season was Doncaster Rovers' 140th season in their existence, 16th consecutive season in the Football League and second consecutive season in League One. Along with League One, the club also participated in the FA Cup, EFL Cup and EFL Trophy.

The season covered the period from 1 July 2018 to 30 June 2019.

== Squad ==
=== Detailed overview ===
League caps and goals up to the start of season 2018–19.
Players with name and squad number struck through and marked † left the club during the playing season.

No.	Name	Position (s)	Nationality	Place of birth	Date of birth (age)	Club caps	Club goals	Int. caps	Int. goals	Signed from
Goalkeepers
1	Ian Lawlor	GK	(Republic of Ireland)	Dublin	27 October 1994 (age 32)	58	0	–	–	Manchester City
13	Marko Maroši	GK	(Slovakia)	Michalovce	23 October 1993 (age 33)	53	0	–	–	Wigan Athletic
Defenders
3	Danny Andrew	LB	(England)	Holbeach	23 December 1990 (age 35)	6	0	–	–	Grimsby Town
6	Andy Butler	CB	(England)	Doncaster	4 November 1983 (age 43)	174	14	–	–	Sheffield United
8	~~Niall Mason~~†	LB/RB	(England)	Bromley	10 January 1997 (age 29)	92	3	–	–	Aston Villa
15	Joe Wright	CB	(Wales)	Monk Fryston, England	26 February 1995 (age 31)	65	0	–	–	Huddersfield Town
20	Tyler Garratt	LB	(England)	Lincoln	26 October 1996 (age 30)	28	0	–	–	Bolton Wanderers
25	~~Mitchell Lund~~†	RB	(England)	Leeds	27 August 1996 (age 30)	45	2	–	–	Academy
39	Danny Amos	LB	(Northern Ireland)	Sheffield, England	22 December 1999 (age 26)	5	0	–	–	Academy
?	Tom Anderson	CB	(England)	Burnley	2 September 1993 (age 33)	7	2	–	–	Burnley
Midfielders
4	Luke McCullough	DM	(Northern Ireland)	Portadown	15 February 1994 (age 32)	111	1	6	0	Manchester United
10	Tommy Rowe	LM	(England)	Wythenshawe	24 September 1988 (age 38)	104	25	–	–	Wolverhampton Wanderers
12	Benjamin Whiteman	AM/CM/RM	(England)	Rochdale	17 June 1996 (age 30)	47	7	–	–	Sheffield United
17	Matty Blair	RM/RB	(England)	Warwick	21 June 1989 (age 37)	94	5	–	–	Mansfield Town
22	Alfie Beestin	AM/CF	(England)	Leeds	1 October 1997 (age 29)	41	3	–	–	Tadcaster Albion
26	James Coppinger	AM/RM/CM	(England)	Guisborough	18 January 1981 (age 45)	574	65	–	–	Exeter City
27	~~Issam Ben Khémis~~†	LM/CM	(Tunisia)	Paris, France	10 January 1996 (age 30)	9	1	1	0	FC Lorient
30	~~Jacob Fletcher~~†	CM	(England)	Doncaster	16 May 2000 (age 26)	3	0	–	–	Academy
32	Cody Prior	CM	(Republic of Ireland)	Kilkenny	28 October 1999 (age 27)	2	0	–	–	Academy
37	~~Morgan James~~†	RM	(England)	Rotherham	27 August 1999 (age 27)	2	0	–	–	Academy
Forwards
9	John Marquis	CF	(England)	Lewisham	16 May 1992 (age 34)	99	41	–	–	Millwall
14	Liam Mandeville	CF	(England)	Lincoln	17 February 1997 (age 29)	64	15	–	–	Academy
19	Alfie May	CF	(England)	Leeds	2 July 1993 (age 33)	47	9	–	–	Hythe Town
21	Will Longbottom	CF	(England)	Leeds	12 December 1998 (age 27)	9	1	–	–	Academy
23	Alex Kiwomya	CF/RW	(England)	Sheffield	20 May 1996 (age 30)	12	1	–	–	Chelsea
34	Lewis Scattergood	CF	(England)	Worksop	21 April 2000 (age 26)	1	0	–	–	Academy
38	~~James Morris~~†	CF	(England)	Doncaster	2 January 2000 (age 26)	1	0	–	–	Academy

=== Statistics ===
This includes any players featured in a match day squad in any competition.

As of 17 May 2019

No.	Pos	Nat	Player	Total		League One		FA Cup		League Cup		League Trophy		League One Play-offs	
No.	Pos	Nat	Player	Apps	Goals	Apps	Goals	Apps	Goals	Apps	Goals	Apps	Goals	Apps	Goals
1	GK	(Republic of Ireland) IRL	Ian Lawlor	17	0	10	0	4	0	1	0	2	0	0	0
2	MF	(England) ENG	Niall Mason	28	0	19+1	0	4	0	2	0	0+2	0	0	0
3	DF	(England) ENG	Danny Andrew	56	5	46	4	6	0	2	1	0	0	2	0
4	DF	(Northern Ireland) NIR	Luke McCullough	1	0	0	0	0	0	0+1	0	0	0	0	0
5	DF	(Wales) WAL	Joe Wright	18	2	14	2	0+1	0	2	0	0	0	0+1	0
6	DF	(England) ENG	Andy Butler	48	3	39+1	1	4	1	1	0	1	0	2	1
7	FW	(England) ENG	Mallik Wilks	55	16	42+4	14	2+2	1	1	1	1+1	0	2	0
8	MF	(England) ENG	Ben Whiteman	50	5	39+1	3	6	2	2	0	0	0	2	0
9	FW	(England) ENG	John Marquis	54	26	44	21	6	3	1	0	1	1	2	1
10	MF	(England) ENG	Tommy Rowe	40	6	18+14	5	1+3	0	1	0	1	0	1+1	1
11	MF	(Scotland) SCO	Ali Crawford	42	3	25+10	3	2+2	0	0	0	2	0	0+1	0
12	DF	(England) ENG	Tom Anderson	33	2	21+2	1	6	1	1	0	3	0	0	0
13	GK	(Slovakia) SVK	Marko Maroši	42	0	36	0	2	0	1	0	1	0	2	0
14	MF	(England) ENG	Alfie Beestin	9	0	0+5	0	0	0	0+1	0	3	0	0	0
15	MF	(England) ENG	Herbie Kane	49	7	37+1	4	6	3	1	0	2	0	2	0
16	MF	(England) ENG	Paul Taylor	19	1	1+13	1	0+2	0	1+1	0	1	0	0	0
17	MF	(England) ENG	Matty Blair	54	6	31+11	4	5+1	1	2	0	2	0	2	1
18	MF	(Tunisia) TUN	Issam Ben Khémis	2	0	0	0	0	0	0+1	0	1	0	0	0
18	FW	(England) ENG	Tyler Smith	14	2	2+12	2	0	0	0	0	0	0	0	0
19	FW	(England) ENG	Alfie May	47	11	8+26	2	5+1	4	1+1	1	2+1	4	0+2	0
21	FW	(England) ENG	Will Longbottom	2	0	0	0	0	0	0	0	1+1	0	0	0
22	MF	(England) ENG	Jermaine Anderson	12	1	1+8	1	0	0	1	0	2	0	0	0
22	MF	(Republic of Ireland) IRL	Kieran Sadlier	19	3	6+8	3	1+2	0	0	0	0	0	1+1	0
23	FW	(England) ENG	Alex Kiwomya	4	0	1+2	0	0	0	0+1	0	0	0	0	0
24	DF	(Northern Ireland) NIR	Danny Amos	2	0	0+1	0	0	0	0	0	1	0	0	0
25	DF	(Ireland) EIR	Shane Blaney	2	0	0	0	0	0	0	0	2	0	0	0
26	FW	(England) ENG	James Coppinger	51	4	38+5	4	5	0	1	0	0	0	2	0
28	DF	(England) ENG	Mitchell Lund	2	0	0	0	0	0	0	0	2	0	0	0
29	DF	(England) ENG	Shaun Cummings	5	0	4	0	0	0	0	0	1	0	0	0
31	DF	(England) ENG	Paul Downing	23	0	17+1	0	2	0	0	0	1	0	2	0
32	MF	(Republic of Ireland) IRL	Cody Prior	1	0	0	0	0	0	0	0	1	0	0	0
33	GK	(England) ENG	Louis Jones	0	0	0	0	0	0	0	0	0	0	0	0
34	FW	(England) ENG	James Morris	1	0	0	0	0	0	0	0	0+1	0	0	0
35	DF	(England) ENG	Branden Horton	2	0	0	0	0	0	0	0	1+1	0	0	0
36	FW	(England) ENG	Myron Gibbons	0	0	0	0	0	0	0	0	0	0	0	0
37	GK	(England) ENG	Declan Ogley	0	0	0	0	0	0	0	0	0	0	0	0
38	MF	(England) ENG	Anthony Greaves	0	0	0	0	0	0	0	0	0	0	0	0
40	FW	(England) ENG	Rieves Boocock	2	0	0+1	0	0+1	0	0	0	0	0	0	0
41	MF	(England) ENG	Lirak Hasani	2	0	0+2	0	0	0	0	0	0	0	0	0
44	DF	(Wales) WAL	Aaron Lewis	7	0	7	0	0	0	0	0	0	0	0	0

==== Goals record ====
As of 17 May 2019.

Rank	No.	Po.	Name	League One	FA Cup	League Cup	League Trophy	League One Play-offs	Total
1	9	FW	John Marquis	21	3	0	1	1	26
2	7	FW	Mallik Wilks	14	1	1	0	0	16
3	19	FW	Alfie May	2	4	1	4	0	11
4	15	MF	Herbie Kane	4	3	0	0	0	7
5	10	MF	Tommy Rowe	5	0	0	0	1	6
5	17	MF	Matty Blair	4	1	0	0	1	6
7	3	DF	Danny Andrew	4	0	1	0	0	5
7	8	MF	Ben Whiteman	3	2	0	0	0	5
9	26	MF	James Coppinger	4	0	0	0	0	4
10	11	MF	Ali Crawford	3	0	0	0	0	3
10	22	MF	Kieran Sadlier	3	0	0	0	0	3
10	6	DF	Andy Butler	1	1	0	0	1	3
13	5	DF	Joe Wright	2	0	0	0	0	2
13	18	FW	Tyler Smith	2	0	0	0	0	2
13	12	DF	Tom Anderson	1	1	0	0	0	2
16	22	MF	Jermaine Anderson	1	0	0	0	0	1
16	16	MF	Paul Taylor	1	0	0	0	0	1
-			Own goal	1	0	0	0	0	1
Total				76	16	3	5	4	104

==== Disciplinary record ====
As of 17 May 2019.

No.	Pos.	Name	League One			FA Cup			League Cup			League Trophy			League One Play-offs			Total		
No.	Pos.	Name	Yellow card	(yellow card) (yellow-red card)	Red card	Yellow card	(yellow card) (yellow-red card)	Red card	Yellow card	(yellow card) (yellow-red card)	Red card	Yellow card	(yellow card) (yellow-red card)	Red card	Yellow card	(yellow card) (yellow-red card)	Red card	Yellow card	(yellow card) (yellow-red card)	Red card
2	DF	Niall Mason	6	0	0	1	0	0	0	0	0	0	0	0	0	0	0	7	0	0
3	DF	Danny Andrew	4	0	0	1	0	0	0	0	0	0	0	0	0	0	0	5	0	0
5	DF	Joe Wright	6	0	0	0	0	0	1	0	0	0	0	0	0	0	0	7	0	0
6	DF	Andy Butler	10	0	0	2	0	0	1	0	0	0	0	0	1	0	0	14	0	0
7	FW	Mallik Wilks	8	0	0	2	0	0	0	0	0	1	0	0	0	0	0	11	0	0
8	MF	Ben Whiteman	9	0	0	2	0	0	1	0	0	0	0	0	1	0	0	13	0	0
9	FW	John Marquis	5	1	0	0	0	0	1	0	0	0	0	0	0	0	0	6	1	0
10	MF	Tommy Rowe	7	0	0	0	0	0	0	0	0	0	0	0	0	0	0	7	0	0
11	MF	Ali Crawford	1	0	0	0	0	0	0	0	0	0	0	0	0	0	0	1	0	0
12	DF	Tom Anderson	4	0	0	1	1	0	1	0	0	1	0	0	0	0	0	7	1	0
13	GK	Marko Maroši	1	0	1	0	0	0	0	0	0	0	0	0	0	0	0	1	0	1
15	MF	Herbie Kane	10	0	0	0	0	0	0	0	0	0	0	0	0	0	0	10	0	0
16	MF	Paul Taylor	1	0	0	0	0	0	0	0	0	0	0	0	0	0	0	1	0	0
17	MF	Matty Blair	6	0	0	1	0	0	0	0	0	1	0	0	0	0	0	8	0	0
18	MF	Issam Ben Khémis	0	0	0	0	0	0	1	0	0	0	0	0	0	0	0	1	0	0
18	FW	Tyler Smith	1	0	0	0	0	0	0	0	0	0	0	0	0	0	0	1	0	0
22	MF	Jermaine Anderson	1	0	0	0	0	0	0	0	0	1	0	0	0	0	0	2	0	0
22	MF	Kieran Sadlier	2	0	0	0	0	0	0	0	0	0	0	0	0	0	0	2	0	0
23	FW	Alex Kiwomya	1	0	0	0	0	0	0	0	0	0	0	0	0	0	0	1	0	0
26	MF	James Coppinger	2	0	0	0	0	0	0	0	0	0	0	0	0	0	0	2	0	0
31	DF	Paul Downing	3	0	0	0	0	0	0	0	0	0	0	0	1	0	0	4	0	0
44	DF	Aaron Lewis	3	0	0	0	0	0	0	0	0	0	0	0	0	0	0	3	0	0
Total			91	1	1	10	1	0	6	0	0	4	0	0	3	0	0	114	2	1

== Transfers ==
=== Transfers in ===
Date from	Position	Nationality	Name	From	Fee	Ref.
1 July 2018	CB	(England)	Tom Anderson	Burnley	Free transfer	
1 July 2018	CF	(England)	Max Watters	Ashford United	Undisclosed	
10 July 2018	LM	(Scotland)	Ali Crawford	Hamilton Academical	Free transfer	
2 August 2018	CF	(England)	Paul Taylor	Bradford City	Free transfer	
14 November 2018	RB	(Jamaica)	Shaun Cummings	Rotherham United	Free transfer	
1 January 2019	LW	(Republic of Ireland)	Kieran Sadlier	(Republic of Ireland) Cork City	Free transfer	
14 January 2019	DF	(England)	Rian McLean	Enfield Town	Undisclosed	

=== Transfers out ===
Date from	Position	Nationality	Name	To	Fee	Ref.
1 July 2018	RB	(England)	Craig Alcock	Cheltenham Town	Released	
1 July 2018	CB	(France)	Mathieu Baudry	Milton Keynes Dons	Released	
1 July 2018	LB	(France)	Cedric Evina	Notts County	Released	
1 July 2018	CB	(England)	Reece Fielding	Ossett United	Released	
1 July 2018	RM	(England)	Tyler Walker	Boston Town	Released	
1 July 2018	CF	(England)	Andy Williams	Northampton Town	Released	
1 January 2019	CM	(Tunisia)	Issam Ben Khémis	Stade Tunisien	Mutual consent	
31 January 2019	CF	(England)	Paul Taylor	Stevenage	Mutual consent	
31 January 2019	RB	(England)	Mitchell Lund	Bradford (Park Avenue)	Mutual consent	
31 January 2019	CF	(England)	James Morris	Free agent	Mutual consent	
31 January 2019	CM	(England)	Jacob Fletcher	Free agent	Mutual consent	
31 January 2019	RM	(England)	Morgan James	Hyde United	Mutual consent	
19 March 2019	RB	(England)	Niall Mason	Peterborough United	Released	

=== Loans in ===
Start date	Position	Nationality	Name	From	End date	Ref.
11 July 2018	CF	(England)	Mallik Wilks	Leeds United	31 May 2019	
2 August 2018	CM	(England)	Herbie Kane	Liverpool	31 May 2019	
24 August 2018	CM	(England)	Jermaine Anderson	Peterborough United	January 2019	
1 January 2019	CF	(England)	Tyler Smith	Sheffield United	31 May 2019	
3 January 2019	RB	(Wales)	Aaron Lewis	Swansea City	31 May 2019	
24 January 2019	CB	(England)	Paul Downing	Blackburn Rovers	31 May 2019	

=== Loans out ===
Start date	Position	Nationality	Name	To	End date	Ref.
12 July 2018	CF	(England)	Liam Mandeville	Morecambe	31 May 2019	
24 July 2018	CB	(Republic of Ireland)	Shane Blaney	Tamworth	January 2019	
2 August 2018	LB	(England)	Tyler Garratt	AFC Wimbledon	31 May 2019	
2 August 2018	FW	(England)	James Morris	Tamworth	September 2018	
9 August 2018	GK	(England)	Louis Jones	Grantham Town	September 2018	
9 August 2018	RW	(England)	Max Watters	Grantham Town	September 2018	
20 August 2018	DM	(Northern Ireland)	Luke McCullough	Tranmere Rovers	31 May 2019	
7 September 2018	FW	(England)	James Morris	Frickley Athletic	October 2018	
9 October 2018	CM	(England)	Jacob Fletcher	Grantham Town	November 2018	
10 October 2018	CB	(Republic of Ireland)	Shane Blaney	Grantham Town	November 2018	
10 October 2018	MF	(England)	Morgan James	Stafford Rangers	November 2018	
11 October 2018	RW	(England)	Alex Kiwomya	Chesterfield	31 May 2019	
7 November 2018	DF	(England)	Branden Horton	Gainsborough Trinity	Work experience	
11 December 2018	SS	(England)	Alfie Beestin	Chesterfield	14 February 2019	
8 January 2019	LB	(Northern Ireland)	Danny Amos	Hartlepool United	31 May 2019	
18 January 2019	MF	(England)	Max Watters	Gainsborough Trinity	17 February 2019	
19 January 2019	MF	(Republic of Ireland)	Cody Prior	Nuneaton Borough	17 February 2019	
25 January 2019	FW	(England)	Will Longbottom	Gainsborough Trinity	25 February 2019	

== Competitions ==
=== Friendlies ===
Doncaster Rovers announced pre-season friendlies against Alfreton Town, Frickley Athletic, Birmingham City and Sheffield United.

7 July 2018 Friendly	Alfreton Town	0–1	Doncaster Rovers	Alfreton
12:00 BST		Report	Wright 60'	Stadium: North Street

10 July 2018 Friendly	Frickley Athletic	0–5	Doncaster Rovers	South Elmsall
19:30 BST		Report	Marquis 33'; Fielding 42'; May 63'; Lund 69'; Morris 74'	Stadium: Westfield Lane

20 July 2018 Friendly	Birmingham City	1–0	Doncaster Rovers	Solihull
19:00 BST	Adams 87'	Report		Stadium: Autotech Stadium

24 July 2018 Friendly	Grimsby Town	1–0	Doncaster Rovers	Cleethorpes
19:30 BST	Hall-Johnson 23'	Report		Stadium: Blundell Park

27 July 2018 Friendly	Doncaster Rovers	0–2	Sheffield United	Doncaster
19:45 BST		Report	McGoldrick 74'; Sharp 79'	Stadium: Keepmoat Stadium

=== League One ===
==== League table ====
Pos	Team	Pld	W	D	L	GF	GA	GD	Pts	Promotion, qualification or relegation
4	Portsmouth	46	25	13	8	83	51	+32	88	Qualification for League One play-offs (Note: Four teams play for one spot and promotion to the EFL Championship.)
5	Sunderland	46	22	19	5	80	47	+33	85	Qualification for League One play-offs
6	Doncaster Rovers	46	20	13	13	76	58	+18	73	Qualification for League One play-offs
7	Peterborough United	46	20	12	14	71	62	+9	72	
8	Coventry City	46	18	11	17	54	54	0	65	

Source: EFL Official Website
Rules for classification: 1) Points; 2) Goal difference; 3) Number of goals scored; 4) Head-to-head results

==== Results summary ====
Overall								Home						Away					
Pld	W	D	L	GF	GA	GD	Pts	W	D	L	GF	GA	GD	W	D	L	GF	GA	GD
46	20	13	13	74	56	+18	73	13	7	3	45	21	+24	7	6	10	29	35	−6

Last updated: 27 April 2019.
Source: https://www.11v11.com/teams/doncaster-rovers/tab/leagueTables/4-may-2019/

==== Results by matchday ====
Matchday	1	2	3	4	5	6	7	8	9	10	11	12	13	14	15	16	17	18	19	20	21	22	23	24	25	26	27	28	29	30	31	32	33	34	35	36	37	38	39	40	41	42	43	44	45	46
Ground	A	H	A	H	H	A	H	A	H	A	A	H	A	H	H	A	A	H	A	H	A	H	H	A	A	H	A	H	A	H	H	A	A	H	A	A	H	A	H	H	A	H	A	H	A	H
Result	W	W	L	D	D	D	W	W	W	W	L	L	W	D	L	L	L	W	D	W	W	W	D	L	W	W	L	D	D	W	W	D	L	D	L	D	D	L	W	W	W	W	L	L	D	W
Position	3	2	5	6	7	7	7	5	4	3	3	6	4	6	7	8	9	8	8	7	6	5	7	7	7	6	7	7	7	6	6	6	6	6	6	6	6	7	6	6	6	6	6	6	6	6

Updated to match(es) played on 4 May 2019. Source: 11v11.com
A = Away; H = Home; W = Win; D = Draw; L = Loss

==== Matches ====
===== August =====
4 August 2018 1	Southend United	2–3	Doncaster Rovers	Southend-on-Sea
15:00 BST	Turner (yellow card) 35'; Hopper 75' (yellow card) 90+10'; Robinson 86'	Report	Butler (yellow card) 29'; Marquis 51'; Mason (yellow card) 57'; Wilks 58' (yellow card) 90+1'; Rowe 70' (yellow card) 90+5'; Kiwomya (yellow card) 90+7'	Stadium: Roots Hall; Attendance: 7,147; Referee: Craig Hicks

11 August 2018 2	Doncaster Rovers	3–0	Wycombe Wanderers	Doncaster
15:00 BST	Butler (yellow card) 16' Whiteman (yellow card) 24'; Wilks 55'; Rowe (yellow card) 76'; Wright 78' Marquis 80'	Report	El-Abd (yellow card) 50' Stewart (yellow card) 76' Gape (yellow card) 89'	Stadium: Keepmoat Stadium; Attendance: 7,122; Referee: Carl Boyeson

18 August 2018 3	Burton Albion	1–0	Doncaster Rovers	Burton upon Trent
15:00 BST	Boyce 47'; Brayford (yellow card) 79'	Report	Butler (yellow card) 67'	Stadium: Pirelli Stadium; Attendance: 3,129; Referee: Peter Bankes

21 August 2018 4	Doncaster Rovers	0–0	Shrewsbury Town	Doncaster
19:45 BST	Wilks (yellow card) 37'	Report	Waterfall (yellow card) 39'	Stadium: Keepmoat Stadium; Attendance: 6,943; Referee: Darren Drysdale

25 August 2018 5	Doncaster Rovers	0–0	Portsmouth	Doncaster
15:00 BST	Whiteman (yellow card) 45+2'; Kane (yellow card) 74'; Maroši (red card) 83'	Report	Thompson (yellow card) 29'; Close (yellow card) 79'; Whatmough (yellow card) 81'	Stadium: Keepmoat Stadium; Attendance: 7,618; Referee: Andy Haines

===== September =====
1 September 2018 6	Peterborough United	1–1	Doncaster Rovers	Peterborough
15:00 BST	Raynor (yellow card) 31' (yellow-red card) 82'; Tafazolli 58'; Daniel (yellow card) 66'; Evans (yellow card) 78' (yellow-red card) 82'	Report	Kane (yellow card) 31'; Marquis 40'; Wilks (yellow card) 50'; Whiteman (yellow card) 81'	Stadium: London Road Stadium; Attendance: 7,060; Referee: Darren Bond

8 September 2018 7	Doncaster Rovers	2–1	Luton Town	Doncaster
15:00 BST	Blair 6'; Whiteman 46'; Wright (yellow card) 55'; Blair (yellow card) 61'	Report	Collins (yellow card) 35'; Lee 45+1'	Stadium: Keepmoat Stadium; Attendance: 7,526; Referee: Tom Nield

15 September 2018 8	Walsall	1–4	Doncaster Rovers	Walsall
15:00 BST	Ferrier 17' (yellow card) 65'; Leahy (yellow card) 33'; Dobson (yellow card) 57'	Report	Marquis 33' (pen.); Wilks 58'; Coppinger 66'; Kane (yellow card) 69'; Mason (yellow card) 71'; Butler (yellow card) 89'; Blair 90+2' (yellow card) 90+3'	Stadium: Bescot Stadium; Attendance: 4,546; Referee: Antony Coggins

22 September 2018 9	Doncaster Rovers	2–1	Bradford City	Doncaster
15:00 BST	Marquis 23', 52'; Whiteman (yellow card) 45'; Mason (yellow card) 47'; Whiteman (yellow card) 45'; Wright (yellow card) 57'	Report	Knight-Percival (yellow card) 32'; Ball (yellow card) 51'; Wood (yellow card) 55'; Miller 81'; McGowan (yellow card) 87'	Stadium: Keepmoat Stadium; Attendance: 8,481; Referee: Martin Coy

29 September 2018 10	Plymouth Argyle	2–3	Doncaster Rovers	Plymouth
15:00 BST	Lameiras 40'; Grant (yellow card) 67'; Carey 90+6', (yellow card) 74'	Report	J. Anderson (yellow card) 2'; Marquis 18', 90', (yellow card) 90+8'; Wright (yellow card) 45+2'; Blair 57'; Andrew (yellow card) 79'	Stadium: Home Park; Attendance: 8,532; Referee: Kevin Johnson

===== October =====
2 October 2018 11	Accrington Stanley	1–0	Doncaster Rovers	Accrington
19:45 BST	Ihiekwe (yellow card) 71'; Zanzala 87', (yellow card) 88'	Report	Kane (yellow card) 45+3'; Andrew (yellow card) 65'	Stadium: Crown Ground; Attendance: 2,327; Referee: Peter Wright

6 October 2018 12	Doncaster Rovers	0–4	Fleetwood Town	Doncaster
15:00 BST	Wright (yellow card) 43'; Kane (yellow card) 61'	Report	Evans 4' (pen.), (yellow card) 45'; Husband (yellow card) 9'; Wallace 34', (yellow card) 44'; Eastham 45+5'; Hunter 49'; Taylor (yellow card) 64'	Stadium: Keepmoat Stadium; Attendance: 6,846; Referee: John Busby

13 October 2018 13	Rochdale	2–3	Doncaster Rovers	Rochdale
15:00 BST	Henderson 59' (pen.); Williams (yellow card) 70'; Cannon (yellow card) 73'; Ntlhe 82'	Report	Mason (yellow card) 17'; Crawford 20'; Wright (yellow card) 27'; Butler 50'; J. Anderson 68'; Taylor (yellow card) 88'	Stadium: Spotland Stadium; Attendance: 3,600; Referee: Scott Oldham

20 October 2018 14	Doncaster Rovers	3–3	Gillingham	Doncaster
15:00 BST	Marquis 51'; Wilks 67'; Whiteman (yellow card) 74'; Taylor 90+1'	Report	Fuller 7'; Eaves 25', (yellow card) 71'; Zakuani (yellow card) 26'; Stevenson (yellow card) 28'; Reilly (yellow card) 65'; Ehmer 88'	Stadium: Keepmoat Stadium; Attendance: 6,891; Referee: Graham Salisbury

23 October 2018 15	Doncaster Rovers	0–1	Sunderland	Doncaster
19:45 BST	Wilks (yellow card) 28'; Whiteman (yellow card) 28'; Mason (yellow card) 59'; Wright (yellow card) 90'; Butler (yellow card) 90+2'; Marquis (yellow card) ??'	Report	McGeouch (yellow card) 14'; Cattermole (yellow card) 16'; Honeyman (yellow card) 34'; Maguire 47'; James (yellow card) 49'	Stadium: Keepmoat Stadium; Attendance: 11,881; Referee: Jeremy Simpson

27 October 2018 16	Coventry City	2–1	Doncaster Rovers	Coventry
15:00 BST	Hiwula-Mayifuila 21'; Thomas 41'	Report	Kane (yellow card) 14'; Wright 69'; Anderson (yellow card) 78'	Stadium: Ricoh Arena; Attendance: 11,006; Referee: Carl Boyeson

===== November =====
3 November 2018 17	Charlton Athletic	2–0	Doncaster Rovers	Charlton
15:00 GMT	Aribo 18'; Grant 33'; Ward (yellow card) 70'	Report	T. Anderson (yellow card) 45+1'; Mason (yellow card) 45+2'; Whiteman (yellow card) 77'; Butler (yellow card) 77'	Stadium: The Valley; Attendance: 9,873; Referee: Gavin Ward

17 November 2018 18	Doncaster Rovers	2–1	AFC Wimbledon	Doncaster
15:00 GMT	Crawford 35'; Rowe 86'	Report	Pinnock 26'; Trotter (yellow card) 36'; Wordsworth (yellow card) 75'; Barcham (yellow card) 90+1'	Stadium: Keepmoat Stadium; Attendance: 7,843; Referee: Antony Coggins

24 November 2018 19	Barnsley	1–1	Doncaster Rovers	Barnsley
15:00 GMT	Woodrow 62'; Cavaré (yellow card) 90+4'	Report	Kane (yellow card) 47' (goal) 52'	Stadium: Oakwell; Attendance: 13,573; Referee: Michael Salisbury

27 November 2018 20	Doncaster Rovers	2–0	Blackpool	Doncaster
19:45 GMT	T. Anderson (yellow card) 29'; Kane 45+3'; Marquis 78'	Report	Pritchard (yellow card) 60'; Heneghan (yellow card) 86'	Stadium: Keepmoat Stadium; Attendance: 6,473; Referee: Seb Stockbridge

===== December =====
8 December 2018 21	Bristol Rovers	0–4	Doncaster Rovers	Horfield, Bristol
15:00 GMT		Report	Marquis 10'; Wilks 43' 59'; Coppinger (yellow card) 45'; T Anderson 54'	Stadium: Memorial Stadium; Attendance: 7,356; Referee: John Busby

15 December 2018 22	Doncaster Rovers	3–0	Scunthorpe United	Doncaster
12:15 GMT	Whiteman 6' (yellow card) 43'; Kane 10' (yellow card) 21'; Marquis (yellow card) 43' (goal) 85'	Report	Borthwick-Jackson (yellow card) 53'	Stadium: Keepmoat Stadium; Attendance: 7,969; Referee: Andy Woolmer

22 December 2018 23	Doncaster Rovers	2–2	Oxford United	Doncaster
15:00 GMT	Whiteman 20' (pen.); Crawford (yellow card) 45'; Butler (yellow card) 80'; May 90'	Report	Dickie (yellow card) 9'; Mousinho (yellow card) 45+2'; Hanson (yellow card) 45+3'; Ruffels (yellow card) 61' (goal) 90+7'; Whyte 64'	Stadium: Keepmoat Stadium; Attendance: 7,425; Referee: Alan Young

26 December 2018 24	Fleetwood Town	3–0	Doncaster Rovers	Fleetwood
15:00 GMT	Madden 11', 90+1'; Sheron (yellow card) 14'; Hunter 48'; Coyle (yellow card) 61'	Report	Butler (yellow card) 55'; Andrew (yellow card) 63'; Rowe (yellow card) 89'	Stadium: Highbury Stadium; Attendance: 2,908; Referee: Peter Wright

29 December 2018 25	Gillingham	1–3	Doncaster Rovers	Gillingham
15:00 GMT	Byrne (yellow card) 39'; Reilly 88'	Report	Marquis 28'; Rowe (yellow card) 53'; Wilks 54'; Andrew 61'	Stadium: Priestfield Stadium; Attendance: 4,791; Referee: Neil Hair

===== January =====
1 January 2019 26	Doncaster Rovers	5–0	Rochdale	Doncaster
15:00 GMT	May 1'; Crawford 23'; Marquis 28', 75'; T Anderson (yellow card) 50'; Coppinger 82'	Report	McGahey (yellow card) 39'; Williams (yellow card) 60'; Camps (yellow card) 66'; Inman (yellow card) 72'; Rathbone (yellow card) 75'	Stadium: Keepmoat Stadium; Attendance: 7,408; Referee: Martin Coy

12 January 2019 27	Wycombe Wanderers	3–2	Doncaster Rovers	High Wycombe
15:00 GMT	Jacobson (yellow card) 75'; Cowan-Hall 77', 90+4' (yellow card) 90+5'; Gape (yellow card) 80'; Thompson 90' (yellow card) 90+9'; Allsop (yellow card) 90+8'	Report	Blair (yellow card) 46'; Marquis 60' (yellow card) 80'; Rowe 70'; Kane (yellow card) 84'; Butler (yellow card) 90+9'	Stadium: Adams Park; Attendance: 4,747; Referee: Trevor Kettle

19 January 2019 28	Doncaster Rovers	2–2	Burton Albion	Doncaster
15:00 GMT	Smith 53', 75', (yellow card) 76'	Report	Brayford 8', 90'	Stadium: Keepmoat Stadium; Attendance: 7,202; Referee: Paul Marsden

===== February =====
2 February 2019 29	Portsmouth	1–1	Doncaster Rovers	Portsmouth
15:00 GMT	Thompson (yellow card) 7'; Bogle 54'; Lowe (yellow card) 56'; Burgess (yellow card) 65'; Naylor (yellow card) 88'	Report	Wilks 30'; Lewis (yellow card) 42'	Stadium: Fratton Park; Attendance: 17,800; Referee: Alan Young

9 February 2019 30	Doncaster Rovers	3–1	Peterborough United	Doncaster
15:00 GMT	Wilks (yellow card) 45+5'; Downing (yellow card) 60'; Blair 62'; Marquis 65'; Sadlier 74'	Report	Cooper 6'; Denton (yellow card) 35' (yellow-red card) 45'; Toney (yellow card) 45+5'; Naismith (yellow card) 84'	Stadium: Keepmoat Stadium; Attendance: 9,627; Referee: Carl Boyeson

12 February 2019 31	Doncaster Rovers	3–0	Southend United	Doncaster
19:45 GMT	Marquis 14'; Lewis (yellow card) 26'; Wilks 55'; Kane 73'	Report		Stadium: Keepmoat Stadium; Attendance: 6,557; Referee: Anthony Backhouse

23 February 2019 32	Scunthorpe United	1–1	Doncaster Rovers	Scunthorpe
13:00 GMT	Sutton (yellow card) 12'; McArdle (yellow card) 61'; Wootton 69'	Report	Wilks 25'; Downing (yellow card) 63'	Stadium: Glanford Park; Attendance: 6,255; Referee: John Brooks

26 February 2019 33	Shrewsbury Town	2–0	Doncaster Rovers	Shrewsbury
19:45 GMT	Waterfall (yellow card) 11'; Laurent 18'; Campbell 35'; Grant (yellow card) 39'; Sears (yellow card) 81'	Report	Rowe (yellow card) 86'	Stadium: New Meadow; Attendance: 5,394; Referee: Matt Donohue

===== March =====
2 March 2019 34	Doncaster Rovers	1–1	Charlton Athletic	Doncaster
15:00 GMT	Wilks 76' (yellow card) 90+8'	Report	Marquis 72' (o.g.)	Stadium: Keepmoat Stadium; Attendance: 8,385; Referee: Ben Toner

9 March 2019 35	AFC Wimbledon	2–0	Doncaster Rovers	Kingston upon Thames
15:00 GMT	Wagstaff (yellow card) 44'; Seddon 67'; McLoughlin 90+3'	Report	Marquis (yellow card) 44' (yellow-red card) 51'	Stadium: Kingsmeadow; Attendance: 4,203; Referee: Paul Marsden

12 March 2019 36	Blackpool	1–1	Doncaster Rovers	Blackpool
19:45 GMT	Nottingham 49' (yellow card) 90+4'	Report	Rowe 73'	Stadium: Bloomfield Road; Attendance: 7,404; Referee: Peter Wright

15 March 2019 37	Doncaster Rovers	0–0	Barnsley	Doncaster
19:45 GMT		Report	Lindsay (yellow card) 20'; Mowatt (yellow card) 90+1'	Stadium: Keepmoat Stadium; Attendance: 11,710; Referee: Ross Joyce

23 March 2019 38	Luton Town	4–0	Doncaster Rovers	Luton
15:00GMT	Mpanzu 33' (yellow card) 69'; Hylton 57'; LuaLua 82'; Berry 90+2'	Report	Lewis (yellow card) 11'; Blair (yellow card) 45'; Coppinger (yellow card) 78'	Stadium: Kenilworth Road; Attendance: 10,071; Referee: John Busby

26 March 2019 39	Doncaster Rovers	4–1	Bristol Rovers	Doncaster
19:45 GMT	Coppinger 2', 12'; Wilks 31' (yellow card) 49'; Sadlier 46'	Report	Clarke-Harris 66'; Holmes-Dennis (yellow card) 70'; Upson (yellow card) 74'; Clarke (yellow card) 90+4'	Stadium: Keepmoat Stadium; Attendance: 6,907; Referee: Martin Coy

30 March 2019 40	Doncaster Rovers	3–1	Walsall	Doncaster
15:00 GMT	Marquis 3' (pen.); Wilks 4'; Andrew 39'	Report	Gordon 14'; Leahy (yellow card) 90+4'	Stadium: Keepmoat Stadium; Attendance: 7,630; Referee: Graham Salisbury

===== April =====
6 April 2019 41	Bradford City	0–1	Doncaster Rovers	Bradford
15:00 BST	Caddis (yellow card) 90+1'	Report	Marquis (yellow card) 33'; Rowe (yellow card) 65'; Wilks 73'; Blair (yellow card) 88'	Stadium: Valley Parade; Attendance: 16,496; Referee: Dean Whitestone

13 April 2019 42	Doncaster Rovers	2–0	Plymouth Argyle	Doncaster
15:00 BST	Rowe 7'; Butler (yellow card) 40'; Andrew 44'	Report	Songo'o (yellow card) 4'; Canavan (yellow card) 66'	Stadium: Keepmoat Stadium; Attendance: 7,795; Referee: Ollie Yates

19 April 2019 43	Sunderland	2–0	Doncaster Rovers	Sunderland
17:15 BST	Morgan 7'; Wyke 32'; Cattermole (yellow card) 67'	Report	Andrew (yellow card) 87'	Stadium: Stadium of Light; Attendance: 34,287; Referee: Andy Woolmer

23 April 2019 44	Doncaster Rovers	1–2	Accrington Stanley	Doncaster
19:45 BST	Andrew 90'; Sadlier (yellow card) 90+2'	Report	McConville 17'; Smyth 44'	Stadium: Keepmoat Stadium; Attendance: 7,222; Referee: Seb Stockbridge

29 April 2019 45	Oxford United	2–2	Doncaster Rovers	Oxford
15:00 BST	Browne 13' (yellow card) 67'; Henry 49'; Nelson (yellow card) 71'	Report	Marquis 7'; Downing (yellow card) 12'; Jones 61' (o.g.); Blair (yellow card) 80'; Kane (yellow card) 88'	Stadium: Kassam Stadium; Attendance: 9,000; Referee: Charles Breakspear

===== May =====
4 May 2019 46	Doncaster Rovers	2–0	Coventry City	Doncaster
17:30 BST	Sadlier (yellow card) 20' (goal) 31'; Wilks (yellow card) 56'; Rowe (yellow card) 84'; Marquis 85'	Report	Thomas (yellow card) 36'	Stadium: Keepmoat Stadium; Attendance: 12,794; Referee: Jeremy Simpson

==== Play-offs ====
12 May 2019 Semi-final first leg	Doncaster Rovers	1–2	Charlton Athletic	Doncaster
12:15 BST	Blair 87'	Report	Bauer (yellow card) 27'; Taylor 32'; Aribo 34'	Stadium: Keepmoat Stadium; Attendance: 11,140; Referee: Oliver Langford

17 May 2019 Semi-final second leg	Charlton Athletic	2–3 (a.e.t.) (4–4 agg.) (4–3 p)	Doncaster Rovers	Charlton
19:45 BST	Bielik 2' (yellow card) 38'; Pratley 101'; Aribo (yellow card) 113'; Pratley (yellow card) 120'	Report	Rowe 11'; Downing (yellow card) 48'; Whiteman (yellow card) 60'; Butler (yellow card) 60' (goal) 88'; Marquis 100'	Stadium: The Valley; Attendance: 25,428; Referee: Gavin Ward
	Penalties
	Solly (penalty scored); Cullen (penalty scored); Taylor (penalty scored); Aribo (penalty scored); Sarr (penalty missed)		(penalty scored) Whiteman; (penalty scored) Sadlier; (penalty scored) Crawford; (penalty missed) Marquis; (penalty missed) Rowe

=== FA Cup ===
The first round draw was made live on BBC by Dennis Wise and Dion Dublin on 22 October. The draw for the second round was made live on BBC and BT by Mark Schwarzer and Glenn Murray on 12 November. The third round draw was made live on BBC by Ruud Gullit and Paul Ince from Stamford Bridge on 3 December 2018. The fourth round draw was made live on BBC by Robbie Keane and Carl Ikeme from Wolverhampton on 7 January 2019. The fifth round draw was broadcast on 28 January 2019 live on BBC, Alex Scott and Ian Wright conducted the draw.

11 November 2018 First round	Chorley	2–2	Doncaster Rovers	Chorley
12:45 GMT	O'Keefe 2'; Meppen-Walter 43'; Challoner (red card) 61'; Wilson (yellow card) 62'; Newby (yellow card) 72'; Carver (yellow card) 81'; Whitham (yellow card) 85'	Report	Kane 11', 77'; Blair (yellow card) 42'; Whiteman (yellow card) 82'; T. Anderson (yellow card) 82'	Stadium: Victory Park; Attendance: 3,239; Referee: Ross Joyce

20 November 2018 First round replay	Doncaster Rovers	7–0	Chorley	Doncaster
19:45 GMT	May 7', 30', 36', 81'; Blair 21'; Kane 28'; T. Anderson (yellow card) 49' (yellow-red card) 59'; Marquis 85'	Report		Stadium: Keepmoat Stadium; Attendance: 3,048; Referee: Darren Drysdale

1 December 2018 Second round	Charlton Athletic	0–2	Doncaster Rovers	Charlton
15:00 GMT	Clarke (yellow card) 90+2'	Report	Butler (yellow card) 61' (goal) 66'; Marquis 77'	Stadium: The Valley; Attendance: 3,249; Referee: Brett Huxtable

6 January 2019 Third round	Preston North End	1–3	Doncaster Rovers	Preston
14:00 GMT	Ledson (yellow card) 38'; Hughes 56'; Gallagher (yellow card) 71'	Report	Butler (yellow card) 2'; Marquis 5'; Wilks (yellow card) 33' (goal) 87'; Anderson 72'; Andrew (yellow card) 77'	Stadium: Deepdale; Attendance: 8,101; Referee: Andy Davies

26 January 2019 Fourth round	Doncaster Rovers	2–1	Oldham Athletic	Doncaster
15:00 GMT	Mason (yellow card) 66'; Whiteman 68', 90' (pen.); Wilks (yellow card) 73'		Baxter (yellow card) 73'; Clarke 84' (red card) 90+6'; Edmundson (yellow card) 86'; Branger (yellow card) 89'	Stadium: Keepmoat Stadium; Attendance: 11,260; Referee: Peter Bankes

17 February 2019 Fifth round	Doncaster Rovers	0–2	Crystal Palace	Doncaster
16:00 GMT	Whiteman (yellow card) 81'	Report	Schlupp 8'; Meyer 45+2'	Stadium: Keepmoat Stadium; Attendance: 14,010; Referee: Mike Dean

=== EFL Cup ===
On 15 June 2018, the draw for the first round was made in Vietnam. The second round draw was made from the Stadium of Light on 16 August.

14 August 2018 First round	Scunthorpe United	1–2	Doncaster Rovers	Scunthorpe
19:45 BST	Perch (yellow card) 33'; Clarke (yellow card) HT; Humphrys 90+2'	Report	Whiteman (yellow card) 26'; Wilks 36'; Butler (yellow card) HT; Andrew 56'	Stadium: Glanford Park; Attendance: 3,272; Referee: Geoff Eltringham

28 August 2018 Second round	Doncaster Rovers	1–2	Blackpool	Doncaster
19:45 BST	May 23'; Wright (yellow card) 31'; Anderson (yellow card) 40'; Ben Khémis (yellow card) 90'	Report	Nottingham 38'; Pritchard 60'; Turton (yellow card) 75'; O'Connor (yellow card) 90+2'	Stadium: Keepmoat Stadium; Attendance: 3,188; Referee: Anthony Backhouse

=== EFL Trophy ===
On 13 July 2018, the initial group stage draw bar the U21 invited clubs was announced.

Pos	Lge	Team	Pld	W	PW	PL	L	GF	GA	GD	Pts	Qualification
1	ACA	Newcastle United U21	3	3	0	0	0	8	3	+5	9	Round 2
2	L2	Notts County	3	1	0	0	2	5	6	−1	3	Round 2
3	L1	Doncaster Rovers	3	1	0	0	2	5	7	−2	3	
4	L2	Grimsby Town	3	1	0	0	2	4	6	−2	3	

Source: EFL.com

4 September 2018 Group stages	Doncaster Rovers	1–3	Newcastle United U21	Doncaster
19:45 BST	Marquis 45+7'; Blair (yellow card) 68'	Report	Allan 14'; Roberts 65'; Sorensen 86'; S. Longstaff (yellow card) 90+6'	Stadium: Keepmoat Stadium; Attendance: 1,544; Referee: Matthew Donohue

9 October 2018 Group stages	Doncaster Rovers	2–0	Grimsby Town	Doncaster
19:45 BST	May 23', 57' (pen.)	Report		Stadium: Keepmoat Stadium; Attendance: 1,420

14 November 2018 Group stages	Notts County	4–2	Doncaster Rovers	Nottingham
19:45 GMT	Dennis 15', 40', 64' (pen.); Boldewijn 26'	Report	May 50', 70'	Stadium: Meadow Lane; Attendance: 915
