= 2019–20 Doncaster Rovers F.C. season =

Doncaster Rovers F.C.
2019–20 season
- Chairman: David Blunt
- Manager: Darren Moore
- Stadium: Keepmoat Stadium
- League One: 9th
- FA Cup: Second round
- EFL Cup: First round
- EFL Trophy: Second round
- Top goalscorer: League: Kieran Sadlier (11); All: Kieran Sadlier (12)
- Highest home attendance: 12,432 vs Sunderland (League One, 29 December 2019)
- Lowest home attendance: 1,322 vs Leicester City U21 (EFL Trophy, 4 December 2019)
- Average home league attendance: 8,297
Home colours	Away colours

The 2019–20 season was Doncaster Rovers' 141st season in their existence, 17th consecutive season in the Football League and third consecutive season in League One. Along with League One, the club also participated in the FA Cup, EFL Cup and EFL Trophy. The season covered the period from 1 July 2019 to 30 June 2020.

== Squad ==
=== Detailed overview ===
Players with previous first team games or current professional contracts with Doncaster before the start of the season, including those coming in from the Academy.
League caps and goals up to the start of season 2019–20.
Players with name and squad number struck through and marked † left the club during the playing season.

No.	Name	Position/s	Nationality	Place of birth	Date of birth (age)	Club caps	Club goals	Int. caps	Int. goals	Signed from
Goalkeepers
1	Ian Lawlor	GK	(Republic of Ireland)	Dublin	27 October 1994 (age 32)	58	0	–	–	Manchester City
13	Louis Jones	GK	(England)	Doncaster	12 October 1998 (age 28)	0	0	–	–	Academy
Defenders
4	Tom Anderson	CB	(England)	Burnley	2 September 1993 (age 33)	40	4	–	–	Burnley
5	Joe Wright	CB	(Wales)	Monk Fryston	26 February 1995 (age 31)	83	2	–	–	Huddersfield Town
16	Danny Amos	LB	(Northern Ireland)	Sheffield	22 December 1999 (age 26)	7	0	–	–	Academy
20	Shane Blaney	CB	(Republic of Ireland)	Letterkenny	20 January 1999 (age 27)	2	0	–	–	Finn Harps
25	Rian McLean	CB	(Jamaica)	Kingston, Jamaica	27 October 1998 (age 28)	0	0	–	–	Enfield Town
28	Branden Horton	LB	(England)		9 September 2000 (age 26)	2	0	–	–	Academy
Midfielders
7	Kieran Sadlier	AM	(Republic of Ireland)	Haywards Heath	14 September 1994 (age 32)	19	3	–	–	Cork City
8	Benjamin Whiteman	AM/CM/RM	(England)	Rochdale	17 June 1996 (age 30)	97	12	–	–	Sheffield United
11	~~Ali Crawford~~†	CM	(Scotland)	Lanark	30 July 1991 (age 35)	42	3	–	–	Hamilton Academical
17	Matty Blair	RM/RB	(England)	Warwick	21 June 1989 (age 37)	148	10	–	–	Mansfield Town
18	Cody Prior	CM	(Republic of Ireland)	Kilkenny	28 October 1999 (age 27)	3	0	–	–	Academy
26	James Coppinger	AM/RM/CM	(England)	Guisborough	18 January 1981 (age 45)	625	69	–	–	Exeter City
27	AJ Greaves	CM	(England)		17 November 2000 (age 25)	0	0	–	–	Academy
35	Lirak Hasani	CM	(England)	Doncaster	25 June 2002 (age 24)	2	0	–	–	Academy
Forwards
9	~~John Marquis~~†	CF	(England)	Lewisham	16 May 1992 (age 34)	153	67	–	–	Millwall
19	~~Alfie May~~†	CF	(England)	Leeds	2 July 1993 (age 33)	94	20	–	–	Hythe Town
21	Will Longbottom	CF	(England)	Leeds	12 December 1998 (age 27)	11	1	–	–	Academy
22	Max Watters	CF/RW	(England)	Upminster	23 March 1999 (age 27)	0	0	–	–	Ashford United
23	Alex Kiwomya	CF/RW	(England)	Sheffield	20 May 1996 (age 30)	16	1	–	–	Chelsea
29	Rieves Boocock	CF	(England)	Sheffield	22 September 2000 (age 26)	2	0	–	–	Academy
30	Myron Gibbons	CF	(England)	Sheffield	15 November 2000 (age 26)	0	0	–	–	Academy

=== Statistics ===
This includes any players featured in a match day squad in any competition.

As of 7 March 2020

No.	Pos	Nat	Player	Total		League One		FA Cup		League Cup		League Trophy		League One Play-offs	
No.	Pos	Nat	Player	Apps	Goals	Apps	Goals	Apps	Goals	Apps	Goals	Apps	Goals	Apps	Goals
1	GK	(Republic of Ireland) IRL	Ian Lawlor	10	0	7	0	0	0	0	0	3	0	0	0
2	DF	(England) ENG	Brad Halliday	42	0	34	0	3	0	1	0	4	0	0	0
3	DF	(England) ENG	Reece James	32	2	26+1	2	2	0	1	0	2	0	0	0
4	DF	(England) ENG	Tom Anderson	37	2	32	1	2	1	1	0	2	0	0	0
5	DF	(Wales) WAL	Joe Wright	26	1	16+4	0	3	0	0	0	2+1	1	0	0
6	MF	(England) ENG	Ben Sheaf	38	1	29+3	1	3	0	0+1	0	1+1	0	0	0
7	MF	(Republic of Ireland) IRL	Kieran Sadlier	40	12	28+5	11	2+1	0	1	0	2+1	1	0	0
8	MF	(England) ENG	Ben Whiteman	40	5	33	5	3	0	1	0	3	0	0	0
9	FW	(England) ENG	Fejiri Okenabirhie	5	2	2+3	2	0	0	0	0	0	0	0	0
10	MF	(England) ENG	Jon Taylor	35	6	22+6	6	2+1	0	0+1	0	1+2	0	0	0
12	MF	(England) ENG	Madger Gomes	29	0	13+10	0	3	0	0	0	2+1	0	0	0
13	GK	(England) ENG	Louis Jones	0	0	0	0	0	0	0	0	0	0	0	0
14	MF	(England) ENG	Jacob Ramsey	7	3	6+1	3	0	0	0	0	0	0	0	0
15	DF	(England) ENG	Alex Baptiste	2	0	2	0	0	0	0	0	0	0	0	0
16	DF	(Northern Ireland) NIR	Danny Amos	5	0	2	0	1	0	0	0	2	0	0	0
17	MF	(England) ENG	Matty Blair	14	0	3+9	0	0	0	1	0	0+1	0	0	0
18	MF	(Democratic Republic of the Congo) COD	Jason Lokilo	1	0	0+1	0	0	0	0	0	0	0	0	0
20	DF	(Ireland) EIR	Shane Blaney	2	0	0	0	0	0	0	0	2	0	0	0
22	FW	(England) ENG	Max Watters	6	0	0+5	0	0	0	0	0	0+1	0	0	0
23	FW	(England) ENG	Alex Kiwomya	4	0	0+1	0	0	0	1	0	2	0	0	0
24	GK	(Senegal) SEN	Seny Dieng	32	0	27	0	3	0	1	0	1	0	0	0
26	MF	(England) ENG	James Coppinger	33	4	24+5	3	3	1	0	0	1	0	0	0
27	MF	(England) ENG	AJ Greaves	2	0	0	0	0	0	0	0	2	0	0	0
31	FW	(England) ENG	Niall Ennis	31	6	21+7	6	0	0	1	0	2	0	0	0
32	DF	(England) ENG	Cameron John	21	3	17+1	2	1	0	1	0	1	1	0	0
36	MF	(England) ENG	Jack Watson	0	0	0	0	0	0	0	0	0	0	0	0
44	FW	(England) ENG	Devante Cole	9	0	5+4	0	0	0	0	0	0	0	0	0
Players who left during the season
11	MF	(Scotland) SCO	Ali Crawford	2	0	0+1	0	0	0	1	0	0	0	0	0
11	FW	(England) ENG	Rakish Bingham	12	2	3+5	1	1+2	1	0	0	0+1	0	0	0
14	FW	(England) ENG	Kazaiah Sterling	4	1	1+2	0	0	0	0	0	0+1	1	0	0
19	FW	(England) ENG	Alfie May	23	3	7+8	1	0+3	0	0+1	0	3+1	2	0	0
21	FW	(England) ENG	Will Longbottom	1	0	0	0	0	0	0	0	1	0	0	0
33	DF	(England) ENG	Donervon Daniels	13	0	8+2	0	0	0	0	0	2+1	0	0	0
39	FW	(England) ENG	Kwame Thomas	16	3	5+5	3	2+1	0	0	0	3	0	0	0

==== Goals record ====
As of 7 March 2020.

Rank	No.	Po.	Name	League One	FA Cup	League Cup	League Trophy	Total
1	7	MF	Kieran Sadlier	11	0	0	1	12
2	10	MF	Jon Taylor	6	0	0	0	6
2	31	FW	Niall Ennis	6	0	0	0	6
4	8	MF	Ben Whiteman	5	0	0	0	5
5	26	MF	James Coppinger	3	1	0	0	4
6	39	FW	Kwame Thomas	3	0	0	0	3
6	14	MF	Jacob Ramsey	3	0	0	0	3
6	32	DF	Cameron John	2	0	0	1	3
6	19	MF	Alfie May	1	0	0	2	3
10	3	DF	Reece James	2	0	0	0	2
10	9	FW	Fejiri Okenabirhie	2	0	0	0	2
10	4	DF	Tom Anderson	1	1	0	0	2
10	11	FW	Rakish Bingham	1	1	0	0	2
14	6	MF	Ben Sheaf	1	0	0	0	1
14	14	FW	Kazaiah Sterling	0	0	0	1	1
14	5	DF	Joe Wright	0	0	0	1	1
-			Own goal	4	0	0	0	4
Total				49	3	0	6	58

==== Disciplinary record ====
As of 7 March 2020.

No.	Pos.	Name	League One			FA Cup			League Cup			League Trophy			Total		
No.	Pos.	Name	Yellow card	(yellow card) (yellow-red card)	Red card	Yellow card	(yellow card) (yellow-red card)	Red card	Yellow card	(yellow card) (yellow-red card)	Red card	Yellow card	(yellow card) (yellow-red card)	Red card	Yellow card	(yellow card) (yellow-red card)	Red card
2	DF	Brad Halliday	7	0	0	1	0	0	0	0	0	1	0	0	9	0	0
3	DF	Reece James	5	0	0	0	0	0	0	0	0	0	0	0	5	0	0
4	DF	Tom Anderson	5	0	1	0	0	0	0	0	0	0	0	0	5	0	1
5	DF	Joe Wright	5	0	0	2	0	0	0	0	0	0	0	0	7	0	0
6	MF	Ben Sheaf	5	0	0	0	0	0	0	0	0	0	0	0	5	0	0
7	MF	Kieran Sadlier	2	0	0	0	0	0	0	0	0	0	0	0	2	0	0
8	MF	Ben Whiteman	5	0	0	0	0	0	0	0	0	0	0	0	5	0	0
9	FW	Fejiri Okenabirhie	0	0	1	0	0	0	0	0	0	0	0	0	0	0	1
10	MF	Jon Taylor	1	0	0	0	0	0	1	0	0	0	0	0	2	0	0
11	FW	Rakish Bingham	1	0	0	1	0	0	0	0	0	0	0	0	2	0	0
12	MF	Madger Gomes	5	0	0	0	0	0	0	0	0	1	0	0	6	0	0
14	DF	Kazaiah Sterling	1	0	0	0	0	0	0	0	0	0	0	0	1	0	0
16	DF	Danny Amos	0	0	0	1	0	0	0	0	0	0	0	0	1	0	0
17	MF	Matty Blair	1	0	0	0	0	0	0	0	0	0	0	0	1	0	0
19	FW	Alfie May	1	0	0	0	0	0	0	0	0	2	0	0	3	0	0
24	GK	Seny Dieng	1	0	0	0	0	0	0	0	0	0	0	0	1	0	0
26	MF	James Coppinger	1	0	0	0	0	0	0	0	0	0	0	0	1	0	0
31	FW	Niall Ennis	3	0	0	0	0	0	0	0	0	1	0	0	4	0	0
32	DF	Cameron John	5	0	0	0	0	0	0	0	0	0	0	0	5	0	0
33	DF	Donervon Daniels	2	0	0	0	0	0	0	0	0	0	0	0	2	0	0
Total			56	0	2	5	0	0	1	0	0	5	0	0	67	0	2

== Transfers ==
=== Transfers in ===
Date	Position	Nationality	Name	From	Fee	Ref.
1 July 2019	CM	(Spain)	Madger Gomes	(Croatia) NK Istra 1961	Undisclosed	
1 July 2019	RB	(England)	Brad Halliday	(England) Cambridge United	Free transfer	
1 July 2019	LB	(England)	Reece James	(England) Sunderland	Undisclosed	
2 August 2019	CB	(England)	Alex Baptiste	(England) Queens Park Rangers	Free transfer	
9 August 2019	RW	(England)	Jon Taylor	(England) Rotherham United	Free transfer	
4 October 2019	FW	(England)	Kwame Thomas	Free agent	None	
1 November 2019	FW	(England)	Rakish Bingham	(England) Cheltenham Town	Free transfer	
1 November 2019	FW	(England)	Harrison Myring	(England) Leicester City	Free transfer	
27 January 2020	CF	(England)	Devante Cole	(England) Wigan Athletic	Undisclosed	
30 January 2020	LW/FW	(England)	Fejiri Okenabirhie	(England) Shrewsbury Town	Undisclosed	

=== Loans in ===
Date from	Position	Nationality	Name	From	Date until	Ref.
12 July 2019	DM	(England)	Ben Sheaf	(England) Arsenal	30 June 2020	
26 July 2019	GK	(Senegal)	Seny Dieng	(England) Queens Park Rangers	30 June 2020 (Note: On 3 January 2020, Dieng's loan was extended until 30 June 2020.)	
2 August 2019	CF	(England)	Niall Ennis	(England) Wolverhampton Wanderers	30 June 2020	
2 August 2019	CB	(England)	Cameron John	(England) Wolverhampton Wanderers	30 June 2020	
16 August 2019	CF	(England)	Kazaiah Sterling	(England) Tottenham Hotspur	30 June 2020 (Note: By 4 January 2020, Sterling had returned to Spurs.)	
2 September 2019	CB	(Montserrat)	Donervon Daniels	(England) Luton Town	1 January 2020	
31 January 2020	AM	(England)	Jacob Ramsey	(England) Aston Villa	30 June 2020	
31 January 2020	AM	(Democratic Republic of the Congo)	Jason Lokilo	(England) Crystal Palace	30 June 2020	

=== Loans out ===
Date from	Position	Nationality	Name	To	Date until	Ref.
16 August 2019	DF	(England)	Rian McLean	Frickley Athletic	October 2019	
16 August 2019	MF	(Republic of Ireland)	Cody Prior	Frickley Athletic	October 2019	
24 August 2019	FW	(England)	Myron Gibbons	Bradford (Park Avenue)		
30 August 2019	DF	(England)	Branden Horton	Gainsborough Trinity	1 January 2020	
30 August 2019	FW	(England)	Rieves Boocock	Frickley Athletic	1 January 2020	
10 September 2019	GK	(England)	Louis Jones	Mickleover Sports	10 November 2019 (Note: On 11 October 2019, Jones' loan was extended until 10 November 2019.)	
27 September 2019	FW	(England)	Max Watters	Mickleover Sports		
27 September 2019	MF	(Republic of Ireland)	Cody Prior	Sheffield	January 2020	
27 September 2019	DF	(England)	Rian McLean	Sheffield	January 2020	
1 October 2019	MF	(England)	AJ Greaves	Gainsborough Trinity	1 November 2019	
11 October 2019	FW	(England)	Myron Gibbons	Gainsborough Trinity		
13 November 2019	CF	(England)	Rieves Boocock	Sheffield	January 2020	
14 November 2019	GK	(England)	Louis Jones	Yeovil Town	January 2020	
27 January 2020	GK	(Republic of Ireland)	Ian Lawlor	Scunthorpe United	30 June 2020	
7 February 2020	CB	(Republic of Ireland)	Shane Blaney	Blyth Spartans	30 June 2020	
7 February 2020	RW	(England)	Alex Kiwomya	Chorley	March 2020	
21 February 2020	MF	(England)	Max Watters	Maidstone United	March 2020	
10 March 2020	DF	(England)	Rian McLean	Pickering Town	April 2020	
11 March 2020	CF	(England)	Rieves Boocock	Tadcaster Albion	April 2020	

=== Transfers out ===
Date	Position	Nationality	Name	To	Fee	Ref.
1 July 2019	LB	(England)	Danny Andrew	(England) Fleetwood Town	Free transfer	
1 July 2019	CB	(England)	Cameron Baldock-Smith	Free agent	Released	
1 July 2019	FW	(England)	Cameron Barnett	(England) Staveley Miners Welfare	Released	
1 July 2019	SS	(England)	Alfie Beestin	(England) Tadcaster Albion	Released	
1 July 2019	CB	(England)	Andy Butler	(England) Scunthorpe United	Free transfer	
1 July 2019	CB	(England)	Cameron Foulkes	Free agent	Released	
1 July 2019	LB	(England)	Tyler Garratt	(England) Stockport County	Released	
1 July 2019	CF	(England)	Liam Mandeville	(England) Chesterfield	Released	
1 July 2019	GK	(Slovakia)	Marko Maroši	(England) Coventry City	Released	
1 July 2019	DM	(England)	Luke McCullough	(England) Tranmere Rovers	Released	
1 July 2019	GK	(England)	Declan Ogley	(England) Belper Town	Released	
1 July 2019	LM	(England)	Tommy Rowe	(England) Bristol City	Rejected contract	
31 July 2019	CF	(England)	John Marquis	(England) Portsmouth	Undisclosed	
2 September 2019	MF	(Scotland)	Ali Crawford	(England) Bolton Wanderers	Released	
3 January 2020	FW	(England)	Alfie May	(England) Cheltenham Town	Undisclosed	
7 January 2020	CF	(England)	Kwame Thomas	(England) Burton Albion	Released	
30 January 2020	FW	(England)	Rakish Bingham	(Scotland) Dundee United	Released	
31 January 2020	FW	(England)	Will Longbottom	Free agent	Released	
31 January 2020	MF	(England)	Cody Prior	Free agent	Released	

== Pre-season ==
Donny announced pre-season friendlies against Rossington Main, Gainsborough Trinity, FC Halifax Town, Grimsby Town and Hull City.

9 July 2019 Friendly	Rossington Main	0–3	Doncaster Rovers	Rossington
19:00 BST		Report	May 14' og 47'; Watters 51'	Stadium: Oxford Street; Attendance: 1,250

13 July 2019 Friendly	Gainsborough Trinity	0–2	Doncaster Rovers	Gainsborough
15:00 BST		Report	Whiteman 25'; Marquis 33'	Stadium: The Northolme; Attendance: 1,123

16 July 2019 Friendly	Doncaster Rovers	1–1	FC Halifax Town	Doncaster
	May 59'	Report	Maher 18'	Stadium: Cantley Park; Attendance: 0

20 July 2019 Friendly	Grimsby Town	1–0	Doncaster Rovers	Cleethorpes
12:00 BST	Hessenthaler 84'	Report		Stadium: Blundell Park; Attendance: 1,331

24 July 2019 Friendly	Doncaster Rovers	0–2	Huddersfield Town	Doncaster
19:30 BST		Report	van La Parra 29'; Bacuna 49'	Stadium: Keepmoat Stadium; Attendance: 3,062; Referee: Darren England

27 July 2019 Friendly	Doncaster Rovers	2–2	Hull City	Doncaster
14:00 BST	Gomez 22'; Coppinger 55'		Irvine 7'; Bowler 89'	Stadium: Keepmoat Stadium; Attendance: 2,477; Referee: Jon Moss

== Competitions ==
=== Overview ===
Competition	Record							
Competition	G	W	D	L	GF	GA	GD	Win %
League One	34	15	9	10	51	33	+18	44.12
FA Cup	3	1	1	1	3	4	−1	33.33
League Cup	1	0	0	1	0	1	−1	0.00
EFL Trophy	4	1	0	3	6	9	−3	25.00
Total	42	17	10	15	60	47	+13	40.48

Source: Competitions

=== League One ===
==== League table ====
Pos	Team	Pld	W	D	L	GF	GA	GD	Pts	PPG	Promotion, qualification or relegation
5	Portsmouth	35	17	9	9	53	36	+17	60	1.71	Qualification for League One play-offs (Note: Four teams play for one spot and promotion to the EFL Championship.)
6	Fleetwood Town	35	16	12	7	51	38	+13	60	1.71	Qualification for League One play-offs
7	Peterborough United	35	17	8	10	68	40	+28	59	1.69	
8	Sunderland	36	16	11	9	48	32	+16	59	1.64	
9	Doncaster Rovers	34	15	9	10	51	33	+18	54	1.59	
10	Gillingham	35	12	15	8	42	34	+8	51	1.46	
11	Ipswich Town	36	14	10	12	46	36	+10	52	1.44	
12	Burton Albion	35	12	12	11	50	50	0	48	1.37	
13	Blackpool	35	11	12	12	44	43	+1	45	1.29	

Source: EFL Official Website
Rules for classification: 1) Points per game; 2) Goal difference; 3) Number of goals scored; 4) Head-to-head results; 5) Wins; 6) Away goals; 7) Penalty points (sec 9.5); 8) 12-point sending-off offences

==== Results summary ====
Overall								Home						Away					
Pld	W	D	L	GF	GA	GD	Pts	W	D	L	GF	GA	GD	W	D	L	GF	GA	GD
34	15	9	10	51	33	+18	54	10	5	4	30	19	+11	5	4	6	21	14	+7

Last updated: 7 March 2020.
Source: BBC

==== Results by matchday ====
Matchday	1	2	3	4	5	6	7	8	9	10	11	12	13	14	15	16	17	18	19	20	21	22	23	24	25	26	27	28	29	30	31	32	33	34
Ground	H	A	H	H	H	A	H	H	A	H	A	H	A	H	A	H	A	H	A	H	H	H	A	H	A	H	A	A	H	H	A	A	H	A
Result	D	D	W	W	W	D	L	W	D	L	L	W	W	D	L	D	L	D	W	L	W	W	W	L	D	W	L	W	D	W	L	L	W	W
Position	10	14	7	8	7	8	10	7	9	10	11	9	7	11	13	13	14	15	14	16	15	11	8	9	10	9	10	9	8	8	9	11	10	9

Updated to match(es) played on 7 March 2020. Source: BBC
A = Away; H = Home; W = Win; D = Draw; L = Loss

==== Matches ====
On Thursday, 20 June 2019, the EFL League One fixtures were revealed.

===== August =====
3 August 2019 1	Doncaster Rovers	1–1	Gillingham	Doncaster
15:00 BST	Sadlier 45+2'	Report	Jakubiak 30'; Fuller (yellow card) 79'	Stadium: Keepmoat Stadium; Attendance: 7,939; Referee: John Busby

10 August 2019 2	Rochdale	1–1	Doncaster Rovers	Rochdale
15:00 BST	Morley 66' (yellow card) 72'; Keohane (yellow card) 89'	Report	Anderson (yellow card) 41'; Sadlier 90+3'	Stadium: Spotland Stadium; Attendance: 3,587; Referee: Trevor Kettle

17 August 2019 3	Doncaster Rovers	3–2	Fleetwood Town	Doncaster
15:00 BST	Sheaf (yellow card) 16'; John 19'; Whiteman (yellow card) 24'; Coppinger 39'; May (yellow card) 62'; Burns o.g. 90+1'	Report	McAleny 10'; Madden 56'; Clarke (yellow card) 62'; Coyle (yellow card) 90+1'	Stadium: Keepmoat Stadium; Attendance: 6,740; Referee: James Adcock

20 August 2019	Bolton Wanderers	Fixture not fulfilled	Doncaster Rovers	Bolton
20:00 BST				Stadium: University of Bolton Stadium
Note: The match was suspended by Bolton without informing the Football League or Doncaster on 19 August 2019 citing concerns over welfare to their playing staff.

24 August 2019 4	Doncaster Rovers	2–1	Lincoln City	Doncaster
12:30 BST	Ennis 13' (yellow card) 45+1'; Gomes (yellow card) 33'; John (yellow card) 80'; Taylor 83'; Sterling (yellow card) 90+1'	Report	Anderson (yellow card) 36'; Grant 57'	Stadium: Keepmoat Stadium; Attendance: 10,177; Referee: Craig Hicks

===== September =====
7 September 2019 5	Doncaster Rovers	2–1	Rotherham United	Doncaster
12:30 BST	Anderson (yellow card) 45+1'; Coppinger 66'; Whiteman 88' (pen.)	Report	Hastie 37'; Wood (yellow card) 43'; Olosunde (yellow card) 57'	Stadium: Keepmoat Stadium; Attendance: 11,407; Referee: Martin Coy

14 September 2019 6	Ipswich Town	0–0	Doncaster Rovers	Ipswich
15:00 BST	Downes (yellow card) 47'	Report	James (yellow card) 35'; Sheaf (yellow card) 62'; Whiteman (yellow card) 65'; Coppinger (yellow card) 69'; Halliday (yellow card) 82'	Stadium: Portman Road; Attendance: 18,928; Referee: Ollie Yates

17 September 2019 7	Doncaster Rovers	0–1	Blackpool	Doncaster
19:45 BST		Report	Thompson (yellow card) 75'; Gnanduillet 90+3'	Stadium: Keepmoat Stadium; Attendance: 6,964; Referee: Antony Coggins

21 September 2019 8	Doncaster Rovers	2–0	Peterborough United	Doncaster
15:00 BST	Coppinger 30'; Sadlier 39'; Ennis (yellow card) 41'; Gomes (yellow card) 90+3'	Report		Stadium: Keepmoat Stadium; Attendance: 8,940; Referee: Ross Joyce

28 September 2019 9	Coventry City	1–1	Doncaster Rovers	Birmingham
15:00 BST	McFadzean (yellow card) 43'; Bakayoko 89' (yellow card) 90+6'; Shipley 90+3'	Report	Whiteman 41'; Reece James (yellow card) 88'	Stadium: St Andrew's; Attendance: 7,010; Referee: James Adcock

===== October =====
5 October 2019 10	Doncaster Rovers	1–2	Portsmouth	Doncaster
15:00 BST	James 82'	Report	Naylor (yellow card) 27'; Harness (yellow card) 41'; Evans 60'; Harrison 90+1'	Stadium: Keepmoat Stadium; Attendance: 8,962; Referee: Andy Haines

12 October 2019 11	Oxford United	3–0	Doncaster Rovers	Oxford
15:00 BST	Henry 45+1', 78' (pen.); Brannagan 47'; Dickie (yellow card) 75'	Report	Taylor (yellow card) 30'; Anderson (yellow card) 55'	Stadium: Kassam Stadium; Attendance: 6,861; Referee: Sebastian Stockbridge

19 October 2019 12	Doncaster Rovers	2–0	Bristol Rovers	Doncaster
15:00 BST	Sadlier 39'; Taylor 56'	Report		Stadium: Keepmoat Stadium; Attendance: 7,659; Referee: David Rock

22 October 2019 13	Southend United	1–7	Doncaster Rovers	Southend-on-Sea
19:45 BST	Hamilton (red card) 6'; Hutchinson 11'; McLaughlin (red card) 53'; Milligan (yellow card) 60'; Lennon (yellow card) 67'	Report	Daniels (yellow card) 1'; Thomas 23' 52'; Ralph 26' (o.g.) 90+1' (o.g.); Whiteman 70'; Sadlier 82'; May 89'	Stadium: Roots Hall; Attendance: 5,066; Referee: Josh Smith

26 October 2019	Tranmere Rovers	P–P	Doncaster Rovers	Birkenhead
15:00 BST		Report		Stadium: Prenton Park
Note: Fixture was postponed due to a waterlogged pitch.

===== November =====
2 November 2019 14	Doncaster Rovers	2–2	Burton Albion	Doncaster
15:00 GMT	Taylor 39'; Sadlier 57'; Ben Whiteman (yellow card) 74'	Report	Templeton 36'; Akins 53' (pen.); Quinn (yellow card) 90+5'	Stadium: Keepmoat Stadium; Attendance: 7,492; Referee: Neil Hair

16 November 2019	Doncaster Rovers	P–P	Shrewsbury Town	Doncaster
15:00 GMT				Stadium: Keepmoat Stadium

23 November 2019 15	Wycombe Wanderers	1–0	Doncaster Rovers	High Wycombe
15:00 GMT	Jacobson 90+2' (pen.)	Report	Anderson (red card) 49'; James (yellow card) 90+5'	Stadium: Adams Park; Attendance: 4,875; Referee: Michael Salisbury

===== December =====
7 December 2019 16	Doncaster Rovers	1–1	Milton Keynes Dons	Doncaster
15:00 GMT	John 85'; Bingham (yellow card) 88'	Report	Boateng (yellow card) 34'; Gilbey 51'; McGrandles (yellow card) 70'	Stadium: Keepmoat Stadium; Attendance: 7,193; Referee: Scott Oldham

14 December 2019 17	Wimbledon	2–1	Doncaster Rovers	Norbiton
15:00 GMT	Forss 56' (pen.); Reilly 70'	Report	Thomas 12'; Sadlier (yellow card) 41'; Daniels (yellow card) 56'; Sheaf (yellow card) 90+3'	Stadium: The Cherry Red Records Stadium; Attendance: 4,311; Referee: Nick Kinseley

21 December 2019 18	Doncaster Rovers	1–1	Accrington Stanley	Doncaster
15:00 GMT	Taylor 57'; Gomes (yellow card) 69'	Report	Zanzala 82'	Stadium: Keepmoat Stadium; Attendance: 7,444; Referee: Andy Haines

26 December 2019 19	Peterborough United	0–3	Doncaster Rovers	Peterborough
15:00 GMT	Toney (yellow card) 43'; Woodyard (yellow card) 44'	Report	Sadlier 17' 61'; Whiteman (yellow card) 44' (goal) 82'; Wright (yellow card) 71'; James (yellow card) 75'; Dieng (yellow card) 76'; John (yellow card) 90+5'	Stadium: London Road; Attendance: 6,786; Referee: David Rock

29 December 2019 20	Doncaster Rovers	1–2	Sunderland	Doncaster
15:00 GMT	Taylor 40'; John (yellow card) 74'	Report	Gooch 6' (yellow card) 55'; Lynch (yellow card) 34'} Maguire 61' (yellow card) 90+1'; Ozturk (yellow card) 70'	Stadium: Keepmoat Stadium; Attendance: 12,432; Referee: Carl Boyeson

===== January =====
1 January 2020 21	Doncaster Rovers	1–0	Oxford United	Doncaster
15:00 GMT	James 34' (yellow card) 57'	Report	Henry (yellow card) 74'	Stadium: Keepmoat Stadium; Attendance: 7,524; Referee: Seb Stockbridge

7 January 2020 22	Doncaster Rovers	2–0	Shrewsbury Town	Doncaster
19:45 GMT	Ennis 4'; Anderson 75'; Halliday (yellow card) 86'	Report	Ebanks-Landell (yellow card) 52'	Stadium: Keepmoat Stadium; Attendance: 7,054; Referee: Ben Toner

11 January 2020 23	Bristol Rovers	0–2	Doncaster Rovers	Bristol
15:00 GMT	Sercombe (yellow card) 67'; Upson (yellow card) 81'	Report	Anderson (yellow card) 67'; Whiteman 86'; Bingham 90+3'	Stadium: Memorial Stadium; Attendance: 6,834; Referee: Brett Huxtable

18 January 2020 24	Doncaster Rovers	0–1	Coventry City	Doncaster
15:00 GMT	Sheaf (yellow card) 55'	Report	Shipley 26'; McCallum (yellow card) 65'; Maroši (yellow card) 88'	Stadium: Keepmoat Stadium; Attendance: 9,537; Referee: Marc Edwards

24 January 2020 25	Sunderland	0–0	Doncaster Rovers	Sunderland
19:45 GMT	Wyke (yellow card) 42'; Ozturk (yellow card) 73'	Report	Halliday (yellow card) 66'	Stadium: Stadium of Light; Attendance: 30,251; Referee: James Adcock

28 January 2020 26	Doncaster Rovers	3–1	Southend United	Doncaster
19:45 GMT	Ennis 24'; Sadlier 41' 55'	Report	Milligan (yellow card) 59'; Phillips 70'	Stadium: Keepmoat Stadium; Attendance: 7,063; Referee: Darren Drysdale

===== February =====
1 February 2020 27	Fleetwood Town	2–1	Doncaster Rovers	Fleetwood
15:00 GMT	Evans 35'; Coyle (yellow card) 40'; Souttar 49'; Whelan (yellow card) 56'; Cairns (yellow card) 83'	Report	Halliday (yellow card) 22'; Ennis 55'; Gomes (yellow card) 90+6'	Stadium: Highbury Stadium; Attendance: 3,008; Referee: Ross Joyce

4 February 2020 28	Tranmere Rovers	0–3	Doncaster Rovers	Birkenhead
19:45 GMT	Cook (yellow card) 90+3'	Report	Wright (yellow card) 51'; Ramsey 54' 75'; John (yellow card) 59'; Halliday (yellow card) 60'; Okenabirhie 84'	Stadium: Prenton Park; Referee: Leigh Doughty

8 February 2020 29	Doncaster Rovers	1–1	Rochdale	Doncaster
15:00 GMT	Taylor 1'; Wright (yellow card) 62'	Report	Rathbone 81'	Stadium: Keepmoat Stadium; Attendance: 7,638; Referee: Neil Hair

11 February 2020 30	Doncaster Rovers	2–1	Bolton Wanderers	Doncaster
19:45 GMT	Ennis (yellow card) 37' (goal) 48'; Okenabirhie 40'; Halliday (yellow card) 90+3'	Report	Dodoo 57'	Stadium: Keepmoat Stadium; Attendance: 7,097; Referee: James Oldham

15 February 2020 31	Gillingham	2–1	Doncaster Rovers	Gillingham
15:00 GMT	O'Connor (yellow card) 41'; John 44' (o.g.) 67' (o.g.); Fuller (yellow card) 83'	Report	Sheaf 13' (yellow card) 85'; John (yellow card) 23'; Okenabirhie (red card) 38'; Wright (yellow card) 76'; Halliday (yellow card) 90'	Stadium: Priestfield Stadium; Attendance: 4,754; Referee: Josh Smith

22 February 2020 32	Shrewsbury Town	1–0	Doncaster Rovers	Shrewsbury
15:00 GMT	Edwards 76'; Lang (yellow card) 90+1'	Report	Gomes (yellow card) 90+1'	Stadium: New Meadow; Attendance: 5,672; Referee: Andy Woolmer

29 February 2020 33	Doncaster Rovers	3–1	Wycombe Wanderers	Doncaster
15:00 GMT	Sadlier (yellow card) 13' (goal) 71'; Ennis 45'; Anderson (yellow card) 62'; McCarthy 83' (o.g.)	Report	Thompson (yellow card) 20'; Akinfenwa 67'	Stadium: Keepmoat Stadium; Attendance: 7,522; Referee: David Rock

===== March =====
7 March 2020 34	Milton Keynes Dons	0–1	Doncaster Rovers	Bletchley
15:00 GMT	Gilbey (yellow card) 58'	Report	Wright (yellow card) 51'; Whiteman (yellow card) 55'; Ramsey 67'; Blair (yellow card) 88'	Stadium: Stadium MK; Attendance: 7,880; Referee: Carl Boyeson

14 March 2020	Doncaster Rovers	v	AFC Wimbledon	Doncaster
15:00 GMT				Stadium: Keepmoat Stadium
Note: Season was suspended until 3 April 2020, due to the COVID-19 pandemic.

17 March 2020	Portsmouth	v	Doncaster Rovers	Milton
19:45 GMT				Stadium: Fratton Park
Note: Season was suspended until 3 April 2020, due to the COVID-19 pandemic.

21 March 2020	Accrington Stanley	v	Doncaster Rovers	Accrington
15:00 GMT				Stadium: Wham Stadium
Note: Season was suspended until 3 April 2020, due to the COVID-19 pandemic.

24 March 2020	Bolton Wanderers	v	Doncaster Rovers	Bolton
20:00 GMT				Stadium: University of Bolton Stadium
Note: Season was suspended until 3 April 2020, due to the COVID-19 pandemic.

28 March 2020	Burton Albion	v	Doncaster Rovers	Burton upon Trent
15:00 GMT				Stadium: Pirelli Stadium
Note: Season was suspended until 3 April 2020, due to the COVID-19 pandemic.

===== April =====
4 April 2020	Doncaster Rovers	v	Tranmere Rovers	Doncaster
15:00 GMT				Stadium: Keepmoat Stadium
Note: On 3 April, the English Football League decided to postpone all football until safe to do so due to the COVID-19 pandemic.

10 April 2020	Lincoln City	v	Doncaster Rovers	Lincoln
15:00 BST				Stadium: Sincil Bank
Note: On 3 April, the English Football League decided to postpone all football until safe to do so due to the COVID-19 pandemic.

18 April 2020	Rotherham United	v	Doncaster Rovers	Rotherham
12:30 BST				Stadium: New York Stadium
Note: On 3 April, the English Football League decided to postpone all football until safe to do so due to the COVID-19 pandemic.

25 April 2020	Doncaster Rovers	v	Ipswich Town	Doncaster
15:00 BST				Stadium: Keepmoat Stadium
Note: On 3 April, the English Football League decided to postpone all football until safe to do so due to the COVID-19 pandemic.

===== May =====
3 May 2020	Blackpool	v	Doncaster Rovers	Blackpool
12:00 BST				Stadium: Bloomfield Road
Note: On 3 April, the English Football League decided to postpone all football until safe to do so due to the COVID-19 pandemic.

=== FA Cup ===
The first round draw was made on 21 October 2019. The second round draw was made live on 11 November from Chichester City's stadium, Oaklands Park.

9 November 2019 First round	AFC Wimbledon	1–1	Doncaster Rovers	Norbiton
15:00 BST	Pigott 43'; Pinnock (yellow card) 66'	Report	Wright (yellow card) 50'; Anderson 63'; Amos (yellow card) 88'	Stadium: The Cherry Red Records Stadium; Attendance: 2,777; Referee: Darren Drysdale

19 November 2019 First round replay	Doncaster Rovers	2–0	AFC Wimbledon	Doncaster
19:45 GMT	Coppinger 52'; Bingham 70'	Report		Stadium: Keepmoat Stadium; Attendance: 3,413; Referee: Chris Sarginson

1 December 2019 Second round	Gillingham	3–0	Doncaster Rovers	Gillingham
14:00 GMT	Byrne 11'; Lee 15'; Hanlan 68'	Report	Halliday (yellow card) 64'; Wright (yellow card) 70'; Bingham (yellow card) 82'	Stadium: Priestfield Stadium; Attendance: 3,216; Referee: Darren Handley

=== EFL Cup ===
The first round draw was made on 20 June.

13 August 2019 First round	Grimsby Town	1–0	Doncaster Rovers	Cleethorpes
19:45 BST	Cook 40'	Report	Taylor (yellow card) 59'	Stadium: Blundell Park; Attendance: 2,470; Referee: John Brooks

=== EFL Trophy ===
On 9 July 2019, the pre-determined group stage draw was announced with Invited clubs to be drawn on 12 July 2019. The draw for the second round was made on 16 November 2019 live on Sky Sports.

Pos	Div	Team	Pld	W	PW	PL	L	GF	GA	GD	Pts	Qualification
1	ACA	Manchester United U21	3	3	0	0	0	5	1	+4	9	Advance to Round 2
2	L1	Doncaster Rovers	3	1	0	0	2	6	6	0	3	Advance to Round 2
3	L1	Lincoln City	3	1	0	0	2	4	4	0	3	
4	L1	Rotherham United	3	1	0	0	2	3	7	−4	3	

Source: EFL.com

3 September 2019 Group stage	Doncaster Rovers	3–1	Lincoln City	Doncaster
19:45 BST	Ennis (yellow card) 38'; John 55'; Sterling 69'; May 80' (yellow card) 89'	Report	Akinde 43'; Bolger (yellow card) 61'	Stadium: The Keepmoat Stadium; Attendance: 2,170; Referee: Scott Oldham

8 October 2019 Group stage	Rotherham United	3–2	Doncaster Rovers	Rotherham
19:00 BST	Wright 11' (o.g.); Morris 67'; Clarke 77'	Report	Sadlier 37'; Wright 54'	Stadium: AESSEAL New York Stadium; Attendance: 2,192; Referee: Marc Edwards

29 October 2019 Group stage	Doncaster Rovers	1–2	Manchester United U21	Doncaster
19:45 GMT	Gomes (yellow card) 39'; May 61' (yellow card) 90'; Halliday (yellow card) 87'	Report	Ramazani (yellow card) 34'; Galbraith 71'; Bughail-Mellor (yellow card) 90'; Greenwood 90+4'	Stadium: Keepmoat Stadium; Attendance: 3,845; Referee: Alan Young

4 December 2019 Second round	Doncaster Rovers	0–3	Leicester City U21	Doncaster
19:45 GMT		Report	Muskwe 13', 66'; Hirst 89'	Stadium: Keepmoat Stadium; Attendance: 1,322; Referee: Ollie Yates

== Awards ==
=== Sky Bet League One Player of the Month ===
Month	Player		Ref
January	(England) Tom Anderson	Nomination	

=== Sky Bet League One Goal of the Month ===
Month	Player	Goal		Ref
August	(England) Niall Ennis	13' vs Lincoln City, 24 August	Nomination	

=== Sky Bet League One Manager of the Month ===
Month	Manager		Ref
January	(England) Darren Moore	Nomination	

=== Club Awards ===
==== Player of the month ====
Awarded monthly to the player that was voted by the Official Supporters Club.

Month	Player	Ref
August	(England) Alfie May	
September	(England) Tom Anderson	
October	(England) Jon Taylor	
November	(England) Jon Taylor	
December	(England) James Coppinger	

==== Goal of the month ====
Awarded monthly to the player that was chosen by fans voting on doncasterroversfc.co.uk.

Month	Player	Goal	Ref
August	(England) James Coppinger	39' vs Fleetwood Town, 17 August	
September	(Republic of Ireland) Kieran Sadlier	39' vs Peterborough United, 21 September	
October	(Republic of Ireland) Kieran Sadlier	37' vs Rotherham United, 8 October	
November	(England) James Coppinger	52' vs AFC Wimbledon, 19 November	
December	(Republic of Ireland) Kieran Sadlier	17' vs Peterborough United, 26 December	
January	(Republic of Ireland) Kieran Sadlier	41' vs Southend United, 26 January	
February	(England) Ben Sheaf	13' vs Gillingham, 15 February	
March	(England) Jacob Ramsey	67' vs MK Dons, 7 March	
