= Niall Ennis =

English footballer (born 1999)

Personal information
- Full name: Niall Nathan Michael Ennis
- Date of birth: 20 May 1999 (age 27)
- Place of birth: Wolverhampton, England
- Height: 5 ft 10 in (1.77 m)
- Position: Forward

Team information
- Current team: Blackpool
- Number: 9

Youth career
- 2006–2017: Wolverhampton Wanderers

Senior career*
Years	Team	Apps	(Gls)
2017–2021	Wolverhampton Wanderers	0	(0)
2017	→ Shrewsbury Town (loan)	1	(0)
2019–2020	→ Doncaster Rovers (loan)	29	(6)
2020–2021	→ Burton Albion (loan)	9	(0)
2021–2023	Plymouth Argyle	87	(22)
2023–2024	Blackburn Rovers	11	(0)
2024–2025	Stoke City	23	(1)
2025	→ Blackpool (loan)	19	(7)
2025–	Blackpool	26	(6)

International career
2015	England U17	7	(3)
2016	England U18	4	(0)
2018	England U19	1	(0)
- * Club domestic league appearances and goals as of 22:35, 12 May 2026 (UTC)

Niall Nathan Michael Ennis (born 20 May 1999) is an English professional footballer who plays as a forward for EFL League One club Blackpool.

Ennis began his career with his local team Wolverhampton Wanderers, progressing through their academy. After loan spells with Shrewsbury Town, Doncaster Rovers and Burton Albion he joined League One side Plymouth Argyle in January 2021. Ennis scored 12 goals in 2022–23 helping them gain promotion to the Championship. He signed for Blackburn Rovers in May 2023 on a four-year contract, however in February 2024 he joined Stoke City. After being unable to become a regular at Stoke, Ennis joined Blackpool, initially on loan before joining permanently in June 2025.

== Career ==
=== Wolverhampton Wanderers ===
Born in Wolverhampton, Ennis is a youth product of hometown club Wolverhampton Wanderers having joined their academy at the age of seven and attended Thomas Telford School. In November 2015 he signed a three-year professional contract to come into effect on his 17th birthday. He suffered a fibula fracture in January 2016 that kept him out of action until the summer. He was part of Wolves' pre-season preparations for the 2016–17 campaign, scoring twice against Cork City and Northampton Town, but did not make a first-team appearance during the season proper after suffering another fibula fracture in November 2016.

On 26 July 2017, he moved on on loan to League One side Shrewsbury Town for the 2017–18 season. He made his senior debut on 8 August 2017 in an EFL Cup first round defeat at Nottingham Forest in a 2–1 loss and then made his league debut against AFC Wimbledon four days later. On 5 September, it was revealed Ennis had suffered yet another long-term injury, this time to his knee, putting him out of action for an estimated four to six months. He was recalled by Wolves in December 2017. Ennis made his first-team debut for Wolverhampton Wanderers on 5 February 2019 in an FA Cup fourth round replay against his former team Shrewsbury, coming on as a late substitute.

Ennis signed a new contract on 2 August 2019 to remain with Wolves until 2022. He then joined Doncaster Rovers on loan for the 2019–20 season alongside Wolves under-21 teammate Cameron John. On 24 August, he scored his first senior goal, a 25-yard strike to open a 2–1 home win over Lincoln City. He scored six goals in 32 games for Doncaster before the League One season was curtailed early due to the coronavirus pandemic. Ennis joined Burton Albion on 16 October 2020 on loan for the 2020–21 season. He was recalled by Wolves on 5 January 2021, after making ten appearances for the Brewers.

=== Plymouth Argyle ===
On 18 January 2021, Ennis joined League One side Plymouth Argyle on a permanent basis, for an undisclosed fee, signing a two-and-a-half-year deal. He scored his first goal for Argyle on 9 February 2021 in a 1–0 win against Accrington Stanley. He was praised by manager Ryan Lowe in March 2021 for the impact he had made since joining the club. Ennis scored twice against rivals Bristol Rovers on 20 March 2021. He scored six goals in 24 appearances in 2020–21 as Plymouth, finished in 17th, six points above the relegation zone. Ennis injured his hamstring in the warm-up prior to the opening match of the 2021–22 season, ruling him out for four months. He returned from injury in December 2021. Ennis would go on to score four goals in 28 games as Plymouth missed out on a play-off spot after losing 5–0 to Milton Keynes Dons on the final day of the season. The 2022–23 season proved to be a very successful season for Ennis and Plymouth as under the management of Steven Schumacher they won the League One title with 101 points, with Ennis scoring 14 goals in 45 matches.

=== Blackburn Rovers ===
On 26 May 2023, it was announced Ennis had rejected a new contract at Plymouth and agreed a four-year deal with Championship side Blackburn Rovers. He scored on his debut for Blackburn in a 4–3 win over Walsall in the EFL Cup on 8 August 2023. Ennis struggled to make much impact under Jon Dahl Tomasson in the first half of the 2023–24 season and after failing to score a league goal in eleven appearances it was reported that Blackburn would be willing to let Ennis leave Ewood Park in the January transfer window.

=== Stoke City ===
Ennis joined Championship rivals Stoke City on 1 February 2024 for an undisclosed fee, linking up with former Plymouth manager Steven Schumacher. Ennis scored his first goal for Stoke on 10 February 2024, against his former team Blackburn Rovers in a 3–1 defeat. He made 14 appearances for Stoke in 2023–24 as the team avoided relegation.

=== Blackpool ===
On 30 January 2025, Ennis joined League One side Blackpool on loan for the remainder of the season. A strong start to his time with the club, scoring four goals in his first month, saw him named EFL League One Player of the Month for February. Ennis ended his loan at Bloomfield Road with seven goals from 19 matches as the Seasiders finished in 9th position. He made his move to Blackpool permanent in June 2025, signing a two-year contract for an undisclosed fee.

== Career statistics ==
As of end of 2025–26 season

Appearances and goals by club, season and competition
Club	Season	League			FA Cup		League Cup		Other		Total	
Club	Season	Division	Apps	Goals	Apps	Goals	Apps	Goals	Apps	Goals	Apps	Goals
Wolverhampton Wanderers	2017–18	Championship	0	0	0	0	0	0	—		0	0
Wolverhampton Wanderers	2018–19	Premier League	0	0	1	0	0	0	—		1	0
Wolverhampton Wanderers	2019–20	Premier League	0	0	0	0	0	0	0	0	0	0
Wolverhampton Wanderers	2020–21	Premier League	0	0	0	0	0	0	—		0	0
Wolverhampton Wanderers	Total		0	0	1	0	0	0	0	0	1	0
Shrewsbury Town (loan)	2017–18	League One	1	0	0	0	1	0	0	0	2	0
Wolverhampton Wanderers U21	2018–19	—			—		—		3 (Note: Appearances in EFL Trophy)	0	3	0
Doncaster Rovers (loan)	2019–20	League One	29	6	0	0	1	0	2	0	32	6
Burton Albion (loan)	2020–21	League One	9	0	1	0	0	0	0	0	10	0
Plymouth Argyle	2020–21	League One	24	6	0	0	0	0	0	0	24	6
Plymouth Argyle	2021–22	League One	25	4	3	0	0	0	0	0	28	4
Plymouth Argyle	2022–23	League One	38	12	1	0	1	0	5	2	45	14
Plymouth Argyle	Total		87	22	4	0	1	0	5	2	97	24
Blackburn Rovers	2023–24	Championship	11	0	0	0	2	1	—		13	1
Stoke City	2023–24	Championship	14	1	0	0	0	0	—		14	1
Stoke City	2024–25	Championship	9	0	1	1	2	0	—		12	1
Stoke City	Total		23	1	1	1	2	0	—		26	2
Blackpool (loan)	2024–25	League One	19	7	0	0	0	0	0	0	19	7
Blackpool	2025–26	League One	26	6	0	0	1	0	0	0	27	6
Career total			205	42	7	1	8	1	10	2	230	46

== Honours ==
Plymouth Argyle

- EFL League One: 2022–23
- EFL Trophy runner-up: 2022–23

Individual

- EFL League One Player of the Month: February 2025
