= Rieves Boocock =

English footballer (born 2000)

Personal information
- Date of birth: 22 September 2000 (age 26)
- Place of birth: Doncaster, England
- Position: Striker

Youth career
- 2009 – 2018: Doncaster Rovers

Senior career*
Years	Team	Apps	(Gls)
2018–2020	Doncaster Rovers	1	(0)
2019	→ Frickley Athletic (loan)	11	(0)
2019–2020	→ Sheffield (loan)	8	(2)
2020	→ Cleethorpes Town (loan)	4	(0)
2020	→ Tadcaster Albion (loan)		
- * Club domestic league appearances and goals as of 20:01, 31 August 2019 (UTC)

Rieves Boocock (born 22 September 2000) is an English professional footballer who plays as a striker.

== Playing career ==
Boocock made his professional debut at age 18 coming on as a substitute for Alfie May in the 89th minute in a 1–3 victory at Gillingham on 29 December 2018 in the EFL League One.

He signed his first professional contract in May 2019.

At the end of August 2019 he went to Frickley Athletic, initially on a months loan. The deal was later extended until January 2020. However, the loan spell was cut short and he joined Sheffield F.C. on 13 November 2019 for one month. The deal was later extended for one month further.

On 31 January 2020, he was loaned out to Cleethorpes Town for one month. On 11 March 2020, he then moved to Tadcaster Albion, also on loan and also for one month. At the end of the 2019-20 season, Boocock left Doncaster, as his contract expired.

== Career statistics ==
As of 1 September 2019

Appearances and goals by club, season and competition
Club	Season	League			FA Cup		League Cup		Other		Total	
Club	Season	Division	Apps	Goals	Apps	Goals	Apps	Goals	Apps	Goals	Apps	Goals
Doncaster Rovers	2018–19	League One	1	0	1	0	0	0	0	0	2	0
Doncaster Rovers	2019–20	League One	0	0	0	0	0	0	0	0	0	0
Frickley Athletic (loan)	2019–20	Northern Premier League Division One South East	1	2	0	0	0	0	0	0	1	2
Career total			2	2	1	0	0	0	0	0	3	2
