= James Morris (footballer, born 2000) =

English footballer

Personal information
- Full name: James Morris
- Date of birth: 2 January 2000 (age 26)
- Place of birth: Doncaster, England
- Position: Striker

Team information
- Current team: Stocksbridge Park Steels

Youth career
- –2017: Doncaster Rovers

College career
Years	Team	Apps	(Gls)
2019–2024	Seattle U Redhawks	65	(26)

Senior career*
Years	Team	Apps	(Gls)
2017–2019	Doncaster Rovers	0	(0)
2018	→ Tamworth (loan)	5	(0)
2024	Matlock Town	6	(0)
2024–	Stocksbridge Park Steels	45	(15)
- * Club domestic league appearances and goals as of 18:58, 28 November 2025 (UTC)

James Morris (born 2 January 2000) is an English college soccer player who plays for Northern Premier League Division One East club Stocksbrige Park Steels.

== Playing career ==
=== Doncaster Rovers ===
Morris made his professional debut in a 1–0 victory over Sunderland U21s on 3 October 2017 in the EFL Trophy coming on as a 45th-minute substitute for Andy Williams.

=== Seattle University Redhawks ===
Morris entered university at Seattle University in Seattle, Washington in 2019. He plays for the university's varsity men's soccer team which competes in the Western Athletic Conference. He scored a brace on his debut against Houston Baptist, and a hat trick against CSU-Bakersfield on 19 October.

=== Return to England ===
In July 2024, Morris joined Northern Premier League Premier Division side Matlock Town. He departed the club in October 2024.

On 4 October 2024, the day after his departure from Matlock Town was announced, Morris joined Stocksbridge Park Steels.
