= Cameron John (footballer) =

English footballer (born 1999)

Personal information
- Full name: Cameron Bradley John
- Date of birth: 24 August 1999 (age 27)
- Place of birth: Havering, England
- Height: 5 ft 11 in (1.81 m)
- Positions: Centre back; left-back

Team information
- Current team: Hartlepool United
- Number: 3

Youth career
- –2015: Southend United
- 2015–2016: Wolverhampton Wanderers

Senior career*
Years	Team	Apps	(Gls)
2016–2020	Wolverhampton Wanderers	0	(0)
2019–2020	→ Doncaster Rovers (loan)	18	(2)
2020–2022	Doncaster Rovers	36	(2)
2022–2024	Rochdale	50	(0)
2024–2026	York City	32	(2)
2025–2026	→ Hartlepool United (loan)	40	(2)
2026–	Hartlepool United	10	(0)
- * Club domestic league appearances and goals as of 11:22, 4 October 2026

Cameron Bradley John (born 24 August 1999) is an English footballer who plays as a left defender who plays for National League club Hartlepool United.

== Career ==
=== Early career ===
As a youth player, John moved from Southend United to Wolves in 2015.

=== Doncaster Rovers ===
He joined Doncaster Rovers on a season long loan on 2 August 2019. He later signed on a two-year deal on 28 August 2020. John was released by the club following relegation at the end of the 2021–22 season.

=== Rochdale ===
On 28 June 2022, John agreed to join Rochdale on a two-year deal. He made 55 appearances for Rochdale in all competitions before leaving following the expiration of his contract.

=== York City ===
On 1 August 2024, he joined National League side York City following a successful trial spell with the club.

On 15 July 2025, it was announced that he had signed on a season-long loan to National League Hartlepool United.

On 11 May 2026, York announced it was releasing him.

=== Hartlepool United ===
In July 2026, John signed permanently for Hartlepool on a one-year contract.

== Career statistics ==
As of 17 October 2026

Appearances and goals by club, season and competition
Club	Season	League			FA Cup		League Cup		Other		Total	
Club	Season	Division	Apps	Goals	Apps	Goals	Apps	Goals	Apps	Goals	Apps	Goals
Wolverhampton Wanderers U21	2018–19	—	—		—		—		3 (Note: Appearance(s) in EFL Trophy)	0	3	0
Doncaster Rovers	2019–20	League One	18	2	1	0	1	0	1	1	21	3
Doncaster Rovers	2020–21	League One	31	2	3	0	1	0	3	0	38	2
Doncaster Rovers	2021–22	League One	5	0	0	0	2	0	0	0	7	0
Doncaster Rovers	Total		54	4	4	0	4	0	4	1	66	5
Rochdale	2022–23	League Two	18	0	1	0	2	0	1	0	22	0
Rochdale	2023–24	National League	32	0	0	0	0	0	1 (Note: Appearance in FA Trophy)	0	33	0
Rochdale	Total		50	0	1	0	2	0	2	0	55	0
York City	2024–25	National League	32	2	0	0	0	0	2 (Note: One appearance in FA Trophy, one appearance in National League play-offs)	0	34	2
Hartlepool United	2025–26	National League	40	2	0	0	0	0	1	0	41	2
Hartlepool United	2026–27	National League	10	0	1	0	0	0	0	0	11	0
Hartlepool United	Total		50	2	1	0	0	0	1	0	52	2
Career total			186	8	6	0	6	0	12	1	209	9
