= Morgan James (footballer) =

English footballer

Personal information
- Date of birth: 27 August 1999 (age 27)
- Position: Defender

Team information
- Current team: Hyde United

Youth career
- Doncaster Rovers

Senior career*
Years	Team	Apps	(Gls)
2017–2019	Doncaster Rovers	0	(0)
2018–2019	→ Stafford Rangers (loan)	?	(?)
2019–	Hyde United	?	(?)
- * Club domestic league appearances and goals as of 13:59, 15 August 2018 (UTC)

Morgan James (born 27 August 1999) is an English professional footballer who plays as a defender for Hyde United.

== Club career ==
He made his debut for Doncaster Rovers on 3 October 2017, in the Football League Trophy. He turned professional in June 2018. On 11 October 2018, Morgan was loaned out to Stafford Rangers for a month.

On 31 January 2019 he was one of five players to leave Doncaster. After leaving Doncaster, he joined Hyde United.
