= Cody Prior =

Irish footballer (born 1999)

Personal information
- Full name: Cody Patrick James Prior
- Date of birth: 28 October 1999 (age 26)
- Position: Midfielder

Senior career*
Years	Team	Apps	(Gls)
2017–2020	Doncaster Rovers	0	(0)
2019	→ Nuneaton Borough (loan)	3	(0)
2019	→ Frickley Athletic (loan)	1	(0)
2019	→ Sheffield (loan)		
- * Club domestic league appearances and goals as of 14:42, 4 February 2020 (UTC)

Cody Patrick James Prior (born 28 October 1999) is an Irish professional footballer who is a free agent, last playing as a midfielder for League One club Doncaster Rovers.

== Career ==
He made his debut for debut for Doncaster Rovers on 3 October 2017, in the Football League Trophy. He turned professional in June 2018.

Prior joined Nuneaton Borough on loan on 19 January 2019 for a month, making 3 appearances. On returning to Doncaster it was announced that Prior had signed a contract extension, keeping him at the club until the summer of 2020. In August 2019 he moved on loan to Frickley Athletic, and the following month to Sheffield.

He was released by Doncaster on 31 January 2020.
