= 2020–21 Scunthorpe United F.C. season =

Scunthorpe United
2020–21 season
- Chairman: Peter Swann
- Manager: Neil Cox
- Stadium: Glanford Park
- League Two: 22nd
- FA Cup: First round (eliminated by Solihull Moors)
- EFL Cup: First round (eliminated by Port Vale)
- EFL Trophy: Group stage
- Top goalscorer: League: Abo Eisa (9 goals); All: Abo Eisa; Ryan Loft (9 each)
Home colours	Away colours	Third colours

The 2020–21 season was Scunthorpe United's 122nd season in their history and the second consecutive season in EFL League Two, Along with League Two, the club also participated in this seasons' editions of the FA Cup, EFL Cup and EFL Trophy.

The season covers the period from 1 July 2020 to 30 June 2021.

== Pre-season ==
15 August 2020 Friendly	Scunthorpe United	2–3	Doncaster Rovers	Scunthorpe
12:00 BST	Eisa 72'; Barks 84'	Report	Halliday 47'; Whiteman 75'; Anderson 87'	Stadium: Sands Venue Stadium

18 August 2020 Friendly	Scunthorpe United	2–1	Hull City Under-23's	Scunthorpe
14:00 BST	Mooney 7'; Colclough 55'	Report	35'	Stadium: Sands Venue Stadium; Attendance: 0

22 August 2020 Friendly	Scunthorpe United	1–0	Nottingham Forest Under-23s	Scunthorpe
15:00 BST	McAtee 49'	Report		Stadium: Sands Venue Stadium; Attendance: 0

25 August 2020 Friendly	Lincoln City	4–0	Scunthorpe United	Lincoln
19:45 BST	Walsh 1'; Elbouzedi 50'; Eyoma 62'; Hopper 86'	Report		Stadium: Sincil Bank; Attendance: 0

== Competitions ==
=== EFL League Two ===
==== League table ====
Pos	Team	Pld	W	D	L	GF	GA	GD	Pts	Promotion, qualification or relegation
17	Harrogate Town	46	16	9	21	52	61	−9	57	
18	Oldham Athletic	46	15	9	22	72	81	−9	54	
19	Walsall	46	11	20	15	45	53	−8	53	
20	Colchester United	46	11	18	17	44	61	−17	51	
21	Barrow	46	13	11	22	53	59	−6	50	
22	Scunthorpe United	46	13	9	24	41	64	−23	48	
23	Southend United (R)	46	10	15	21	29	58	−29	45	Relegation to National League
24	Grimsby Town (R)	46	10	13	23	37	69	−32	43	Relegation to National League

Updated to match(es) played on 31 May 2021. Source: EFL Official Website
Rules for classification: 1) Points; 2) Goal difference; 3) Number of goals scored; 4) Head-to-head results; 5) Wins; 6) Away goals; 7) Penalty points (sec 9.5); 8) 12-point sending off offences
(R) Relegated

==== Results summary ====
Overall								Home						Away					
Pld	W	D	L	GF	GA	GD	Pts	W	D	L	GF	GA	GD	W	D	L	GF	GA	GD
46	13	9	24	41	64	−23	48	7	6	10	22	28	−6	6	3	14	19	36	−17

Last updated: 8 May 2021.
Source: BBC

==== Results by matchday ====
Matchday	1	2	3	4	5	6	7	8	9	10	11	12	13	14	15	16	17	18	19	20	21	22	23	24	25	26	27	28	29	30	31	32	33	34	35	36	37	38	39	40	41	42	43	44	45	46
Ground	H	A	H	A	H	H	A	A	A	A	H	H	A	H	H	A	H	A	H	A	A	H	A	H	H	A	H	A	H	A	A	H	A	H	H	H	H	A	H	A	A	A	H	A	A	H
Result	D	L	W	L	L	L	L	L	W	W	D	L	W	W	L	L	W	L	L	W	L	L	L	W	W	W	W	L	L	W	D	L	D	D	D	W	D	L	D	L	L	L	L	L	D	L
Position	13	18	14	18	19	21	23	23	23	22	22	23	20	18	18	18	18	18	20	19	20	20	21	19	17	16	16	16	19	18	17	18	18	18	18	16	16	18	18	19	20	20	21	22	22	22

Updated to match(es) played on 8 May 2021. Source: 11v11 for league tables and fixtures
A = Away; H = Home; W = Win; D = Draw; L = Loss

==== Matches ====
Win Draw Loss Postponed

The 2020/21 season fixtures were released on 21 August.

12 September 2020 1	Scunthorpe United	1–1	Newport County	Scunthorpe
15:00 BST	Loft 58' (yellow card) 65'; Spence (yellow card) 77'	Report	Taylor 32'	Stadium: Sands Venue Stadium; Attendance: 0 Referee: Ben Speedie

19 September 2020 2	Crawley Town	1–0	Scunthorpe United	Crawley
15:00 BST	Nichols 15'	Report	Hornshaw (yellow card) 24'	Stadium: People's Pension Stadium; Attendance: 0 Referee: Carl Brook

26 September 2020 3	Scunthorpe United	1–0	Carlisle United	Scunthorpe
15:00 BST	Hallam 35'; Spence (yellow card) 73'; Beestin (yellow card) 84'	Report		Stadium: Sands Venue Stadium; Attendance: 0 Referee: Peter Wright

3 October 2020 4	Tranmere Rovers	2–0	Scunthorpe United	Birkenhead
15:00 BST	Vaughan 41', 66'; Morris (yellow card) 53'; Davies (yellow card) 87'	Report	Hornshaw (yellow card) 71'; Bedeau (yellow card) 85'	Stadium: Prenton Park; Attendance: 0 Referee: Anthony Backhouse

10 October 2020 5	Scunthorpe United	1–4	Forest Green Rovers	Scunthorpe
15:00 BST	Jarvis 9'; Spence (yellow card) 61'; Bedeau (yellow card) 79'	Report	Matt 24', 32', 83'; Winchester (yellow card) 90+1'; Stevens 90+5'	Stadium: Sands Venue Stadium; Attendance: 0 Referee: Ross Joyce

17 October 2020 6	Scunthorpe United	0–5	Cambridge United	Scunthorpe
15:00 BST	Hippolyte (yellow card) 47' (yellow-red card) 55'; Taylor (yellow card) 48'; Spence (yellow card) 53'	Report	Mullin 35' (pen.), 44' (pen.); Cordner 51' (o.g.); Ironside 61', 83' (yellow card) 77'	Stadium: Sands Venue Stadium; Attendance: 0 Referee: Chris Sarginson

20 October 2020 7	Cheltenham Town	1–0	Scunthorpe United	Cheltenham
18:00 BST	Reid 5' (pen.); Boyle (yellow card) 27'; Raglan (yellow card) 60'	Report	Spence (yellow card) 35'	Stadium: Whaddon Road; Attendance: 0 Referee: Sam Allison

24 October 2020 8	Exeter City	3–1	Scunthorpe United	Exeter
13:00 BST	Randall 36'; Jay 39'; Taylor 89'	Report	Jarvis (yellow card) 42'; Rowe 48'	Stadium: St James Park; Attendance: 0 Referee: David Rock

14 November 2020 9	Oldham Athletic	0–2	Scunthorpe United	Oldham
15:00 GMT	Hamer (yellow card) 34'	Report	Bedeau 60'; Eisa (yellow card) 62' van Veen 78'	Stadium: Boundary Park; Attendance: 0 Referee: Lee Swabey

17 November 2020 10	Port Vale	0–1	Scunthorpe United	Burslem
19:00 GMT		Report	Loft (yellow card) 27'; Eisa 28'; Rowe (yellow card) 58'	Stadium: Vale Park; Attendance: 0 Referee: Leigh Doughty

21 November 2020 11	Scunthorpe United	1–1	Morecambe	Scunthorpe
15:00 GMT	Onariase 80'; Rowe (yellow card) 90+5'	Report	Wildig 90+3'; Cooney (yellow card) 90+5'	Stadium: Sands Venue Stadium; Attendance: 0 Referee: Peter Wright

24 November 2020 12	Scunthorpe United	0–1	Bolton Wanderers	Scunthorpe
19:00 GMT		Report	Kioso 57'	Stadium: Sands Venue Stadium; Attendance: 0 Referee: Martin Coy

1 December 2020 13	Harrogate Town	2–5	Scunthorpe United	Harrogate
19:00 GMT	Muldoon 35'; Hall 90+2'	Report	Onariase 16'; Eisa 41', 63' (pen.); Loft 74'; Jarvis 89'	Stadium: The EnviroVent Stadium; Attendance: 0 Referee: Paul Howard

5 December 2020 14	Scunthorpe United	2–0	Leyton Orient	Scunthorpe
13:00 GMT	Loft 28'; Beestin 78'	Report	Johnson (penalty missed) 7' (yellow card) 79'; Widdowson (yellow card) 33'; Wilkinson (yellow card) 43'; Brophy (yellow card) 83'; McAnuff (yellow card) 84'	Stadium: Sands Venue Stadium; Attendance: 0 Referee: Ross Joyce

8 December 2020 15	Scunthorpe United	0–1	Colchester United	Scunthorpe
19:00 GMT	Loft (yellow card) 62'	Report	Smith 26'; Welch-Hayes (yellow card) 35'; Clampin (yellow card) 86'	Stadium: Sands Venue Stadium; Attendance: 0 Referee: Charles Breakspear

12 December 2020 16	Southend United	1–0	Scunthorpe United	Southend-on-Sea
15:00 GMT	Olayinka 80'	Report		Stadium: Roots Hall; Attendance: 2,000; Referee: Stephen Martin

15 December 2020 17	Scunthorpe United	2–1	Barrow	Scunthorpe
19:00 GMT	Eisa 13'; Clarke (yellow card) 31' (goal) 90+1'; Bedeau (yellow card) 81'	Report	Quigley 16'; Wilson (yellow card) 33'; Beadling (yellow card) 90+1'	Stadium: Sands Venue Stadium; Attendance: 0 Referee: Will Finnie

19 December 2020 18	Grimsby Town	1–0	Scunthorpe United	Cleethorpes
15:00 GMT	Pollock 21'; Spokes (yellow card) 59'; Holloway (yellow card)	Report	McAtee (yellow card) 39'; Jarvis (yellow card) 55'; Clarke (yellow card) 69'	Stadium: Blundell Park; Attendance: 0 Referee: Darren Drysdale

26 December 2020 19	Scunthorpe United	2–3	Mansfield Town	Scunthorpe
13:00 GMT	Clarke (yellow card) 26'; Rawson 38' (o.g.); McAtee 70'	Report	Lapslie 16'; Onariase 29' (o.g.); Bowery 60'; Gordon (yellow card) 88'	Stadium: Sands Venue Stadium; Attendance: 0 Referee: Graham Salisbury

29 December 2020 20	Walsall	1–2	Scunthorpe United	Bescot
19:00 GMT	McDonald 55'; Gordon (penalty missed) 61'	Report	Loft (yellow card) 20'; Hippolyte 27'; Gilliead 69'	Stadium: Banks's Stadium; Attendance: 0 Referee: Trevor Kettle

2 January 2021 21	Stevenage	3–1	Scunthorpe United	Stevenage
15:00 GMT	Carter 11', 22'; Wildin (yellow card) 56'; Newton (yellow card) 81'; Oteh (yellow card) 83' (goal) 90+2'; Read (yellow card) 87'	Report	Green 5'; Gilliead (yellow card) 43'	Stadium: Lamex Stadium; Attendance: 0 Referee: Christopher Pollard

12 January 2021 22	Scunthorpe United	0–1	Salford City	Scunthorpe
19:00 GMT		Report	Henderson 89'	Stadium: Sands Venue Stadium; Attendance: 0 Referee: Martin Coy

16 January 2021 23	Barrow	1–0	Scunthorpe United	Barrow-in-Furness
15:00 GMT	Platt (yellow card) 36'; Kay 58', (yellow card) 90+17'; Quigley (yellow card) 90+10'	Report	Brown (yellow card) 28' (yellow-red card) 86'; Clarke (yellow card) 77'	Stadium: Furness Building Society Stadium; Attendance: 0 Referee: Chris Sarginson

23 January 2021 24	Scunthorpe United	3–0	Grimsby Town	Scunthorpe
13:00 GMT	Eisa 14', 65'; Loft 38', (yellow card) 75'; Gilliead (yellow card) 83'	Report	Wright (yellow card) 29'	Stadium: Sands Venue Stadium; Attendance: 0 Referee: Ollie Yates

26 January 2021 25	Scunthorpe United	2–0	Port Vale	Scunthorpe
19:00 GMT	Rowe (yellow card) 1'; Loft 26', 32'; Karacan (yellow card) 41'	Report	Mills (yellow card) 44'; Worrall (yellow card) 86'; Brisley (yellow card) 90'	Stadium: Sands Venue Stadium; Attendance: 0 Referee: James Bell

29 January 2021 26	Colchester United	0–1	Scunthorpe United	Colchester
19:00 GMT	Eastman (yellow card) 45+7'; Harriott (yellow card) 57'; Smith (yellow card) 75'	Report	Beestin 5'; Brown (yellow card) 53'; Eisa (yellow card) 84'	Stadium: JobServe Community Stadium; Attendance: 0 Referee: Lee Swabey

20 February 2021 27	Scunthorpe United	3–1	Harrogate Town	Scunthorpe
15:00 GMT	Green 4'; Loft 45+3'; Eisa (yellow card) 69'; Spence 90'	Report	March 27' (pen.)	Stadium: Sands Venue Stadium; Attendance: 0 Referee: John Busby

23 February 2021 28	Bolton Wanderers	2–0	Scunthorpe United	Horwich
19:00 GMT	John (yellow card) 26'; Doyle 37' (pen.), (yellow card) 68'; Thomason (yellow card) 62'; Sarcevic 74'; Williams (yellow card) 84'	Report	McGahey (yellow card) 62'	Stadium: University of Bolton Stadium; Attendance: 0 Referee: Anthony Backhouse

27 February 2021 29	Scunthorpe United	0–2	Cheltenham Town	Scunthorpe
15:00 GMT		Report	Smith 25'; Wright 41'; Thomas (yellow card) 61'	Stadium: Sands Venue Stadium; Attendance: 0 Referee: Christopher Pollard

2 March 2021 30	Cambridge United	0–1	Scunthorpe United	Cambridge
19:00 GMT	Mullin (yellow card) 90+1'; Ironside (yellow card) 90+5'	Report	Beestin 78'	Stadium: The Abbey Stadium; Attendance: 0 Referee: Craig Hicks

6 March 2021 31	Salford City	1–1	Scunthorpe United	Salford
15:00 GMT	Touray (yellow card) 14'; Clarke 33'; Thomas-Asante (yellow card) 68'; Henderson (yellow card) 88'	Report	van Veen (yellow card) 21'; Rowe (yellow card) 34'; Eisa 43' (pen.); Hippolyte (yellow card) 45+1'	Stadium: Moor Lane; Attendance: 0 Referee: Allan Young

9 March 2021 32	Scunthorpe United	0–2	Exeter City	Scunthorpe
19:00 GMT		Report	Jay 11'; Sparkes 89'	Stadium: Sands Venue Stadium; Attendance: 0 Referee: Seb Stockbridge

13 March 2021 33	Leyton Orient	1–1	Scunthorpe United	Leyton
13:00 GMT	Cissé 34'; Brophy (yellow card) 50'; Clay (yellow card) 62'; Johnson (yellow card) 90+3'	Report	Loft 12'; Karacan (yellow card) 78'	Stadium: Breyer Group Stadium; Attendance: 0 Referee: Ben Speedie

16 March 2021 34	Scunthorpe United	1–1	Oldham Athletic	Scunthorpe
19:00 GMT	Spence (yellow card) 70'; Loft (yellow card) 87'; Hallam 90+3'	Report	McCalmont 48'; Jameson (yellow card) 53'; Keillor-Dunn (yellow card) 72'	Stadium: Sands Venue Stadium; Attendance: 0 Referee: Sam Allison

20 March 2021 35	Scunthorpe United	1–1	Southend United	Scunthorpe
15:00 GMT	Karacan (yellow card) 75'; Clarke (red card) 78'; Beestin 90'	Report	Hart (yellow card) 62'; Dieng (yellow card) 67'; Nathaniel-George 79' (pen.)	Stadium: Sands Venue Stadium; Attendance: 0 Referee: Robert Lewis

23 March 2021 36	Scunthorpe United	2–0	Bradford City	Scunthorpe
19:00 GMT	Eisa 5'; Green 59'	Report	Sutton (yellow card) 47'; Rowe (yellow card) 75'; O'Connor (yellow card) 88'	Stadium: Sands Venue Stadium; Attendance: 0 Referee: Tom Nield

2 April 2021 37	Scunthorpe United	0–0	Crawley Town	Scunthorpe
13:00 GMT	Green (yellow card) 63'	Report	McNerney (yellow card) 50'; Francomb (yellow card) 90'	Stadium: Sands Venue Stadium; Attendance: 0 Referee: Andy Haines

6 April 2021 38	Carlisle United	2–0	Scunthorpe United	Carlisle
18:30 BST	Mellish 60', 62'	Report	Loft (yellow card) 45+1'	Stadium: Brunton Park; Attendance: 0 Referee: Sam Barrott

10 April 2021 39	Scunthorpe United	0–0	Tranmere Rovers	Scunthorpe
15:00 BST	Hippolyte (yellow card) 45'; Gilliead (yellow card) 65'	Report	Macdonald (yellow card) 42'	Stadium: Sands Venue Stadium; Attendance: 0 Referee: Andy Davies

13 April 2021 40	Morecambe	4–1	Scunthorpe United	Morecambe
18:30 BST	Stockton 25'; Mendes Gomes 37'; Bedeau 49' (o.g.); Songo'o 60', (yellow card) 78'	Report	Howe (yellow card) 29'; Beestin 83'	Stadium: Mazuma Stadium; Attendance: 0 Referee: Declan Bourne

17 April 2021 41	Forest Green Rovers	3–2	Scunthorpe United	Nailsworth
12:30 BST	Moore-Taylor 21'; Wilson (yellow card) 47'; Bernard (yellow card) 61'; Adams 72'; Cadden (penalty missed) 79'; Stokes 80'	Report	Clarke (yellow card) 17'; McGahey 45+1'; Eisa 52'; Karacan (yellow card) 69'; Gilliead (yellow card) 83'	Stadium: The Innocent [Insert Name Here] Stadium; Attendance: 0 Referee: Graham Salisbury

20 April 2021 42	Mansfield Town	3–0	Scunthorpe United	Mansfield
19:00 BST	Lapslie 19'; Sweeney (yellow card) 62'; McLaughlin (yellow card) 71'; Perch 80'; Sinclair 83'	Report	Spence (yellow card) 66'	Stadium: One Call Stadium; Attendance: 0 Referee: Brett Huxtable

24 April 2021 43	Scunthorpe United	0–2	Walsall	Scunthorpe
15:00 BST	Beestin (yellow card) 67'	Report	Osadebe 13'; Gordon 23'; Clarke (yellow card) 90+1'	Stadium: Sands Venue Stadium; Attendance: 0 Referee: James Adcock

27 April 2021 44	Newport County	4–0	Scunthorpe United	Newport
18:00 BST	Taft 29' (o.g.); Demetriou 34', 85'; Collins 39'; Shephard (yellow card) 87'	Report	Green (yellow card) 87'; Onariase (yellow card) 90+1'	Stadium: Rodney Parade; Attendance: 0 Referee: Craig Hicks

1 May 2021 45	Bradford City	0–0	Scunthorpe United	Bradford
15:00 BST		Report		Stadium: Utilita Energy Stadium; Attendance: 0 Referee: Marc Edwards

8 May 2021 46	Scunthorpe United	0–1	Stevenage	Scunthorpe
15:00 BST		Report	Martin (yellow card) 11'; Vancooten (yellow card) 31'; Pett (yellow card) 43'; List 59'; Vincelot (yellow card) 90+4'	Stadium: Glanford Park; Attendance: 0 Referee: Ollie Yates

=== FA Cup ===
The draw for the first round was made on Monday 26, October.

Win Draw Loss

8 November 2020 First round	Scunthorpe United	2–3	Solihull Moors	Scunthorpe
12:00 GMT	McAtee 14'; Cordner (yellow card) 48' (yellow-red card) 90+3' van Veen 84'	Report	Gleeson 4' (pen.), 80' (pen.); Pearce 49'; Williams (yellow card) 59'	Stadium: Sands Venue Stadium; Attendance: 0 Referee: James Bell

=== EFL Cup ===
Win Draw Loss

The first round draw was made on 18 August, live on Sky Sports, by Paul Merson.

5 September 2020 First round	Scunthorpe United	1–2	Port Vale	Scunthorpe
15:00 BST	Colclough (yellow card) 45+2'; Loft 69'; Spence (yellow card) 79'	Report	Mills 45+5'; Legge (yellow card) 89'; Robinson 90+3'	Stadium: Sands Venue Stadium; Attendance: 0 Referee: Neil Hair

=== EFL Trophy ===
Win Draw Loss

The regional group stage draw was confirmed on 18 August.

Pos	Div	Team	Pld	W	PW	PL	L	GF	GA	GD	Pts	Qualification
1	ACA	Manchester City U21	3	2	0	1	0	8	1	+7	7	Advance to Round 2
2	L1	Lincoln City	3	1	2	0	0	5	3	+2	7	Advance to Round 2
3	L2	Mansfield Town	3	1	0	0	2	3	7	−4	3	
4	L2	Scunthorpe United	3	0	0	1	2	2	7	−5	1	

Source: EFL.com

8 September 2020 Group Game 1	Lincoln City	1–1	Scunthorpe United	Lincoln
19:00 BST	Palmer (yellow card) 19'; Melbourne (yellow card) 51'; Anderson 80'	Report	Cordner 38'	Stadium: LNER Stadium; Attendance: 0 Referee: James Oldham
	Penalties
	Howarth (penalty scored); Montsma (penalty scored); Scully (penalty scored); Jones (penalty scored)		Jarvis (penalty missed); Vincent (penalty scored); Hippolyte (penalty missed); Gilliead (penalty scored)

29 September 2020 Group stage	Scunthorpe United	0–4	Manchester City U21	Scunthorpe
19:00 BST		Report	Knight 17', 63'; Edozie 58', 66'	Stadium: Sands Venue Stadium; Attendance: 0 Referee: James Adcock

10 November 2020 Group stage	Scunthorpe United	1–2	Mansfield Town	Scunthorpe
19:00 GMT	Loft (yellow card) 27'; O'Malley (yellow card) 63'; Rowe (yellow card) 75'; Olomola 78'	Report	Sweeney 34'; Reid 44'	Stadium: Sands Venue Stadium; Attendance: 0 Referee: Sam Barrott

== First-team squad ==
As of 18 January 2021

Note: Flags indicate national team as has been defined under FIFA eligibility rules. Players may hold more than one non-FIFA nationality.

No.	Name	Nat.	Position(s)	Date of birth (age)	Apps.	Goals	Year signed	Signed from	Transfer fee
Goalkeepers
1	Rory Watson	(England)	GK	5 February 1996 (age 30)	52	0	2017	(England) Hull City	Free
31	Adam Kelsey	(England)	GK	12 November 1999 (age 27)	1	0	2017	Academy	Trainee
33	Mark Howard	(England)	GK	21 September 1986 (age 40)	20	0	2020	Free Agent	Free
41	Tom Collins	(England)	GK	4 August 2002 (age 24)	0	0	2020	Academy	Trainee
Defenders
2	Jordan Clarke	(England)	RB/LB/CB	19 October 1991 (age 35)	167	5	2015	(England) Coventry City	Undisclosed
3	George Taft	(England)	LB/CB	29 July 1993 (age 33)	5	0	2021	(England) Bolton Wanderers	Loan
4	Jacob Bedeau	(England)	CB	24 December 1999 (age 26)	37	2	2019	(England) Aston Villa	Undisclosed
5	Harrison McGahey	(England)	CB/RB	26 September 1995 (age 31)	56	0	2019	(England) Rochdale	Undisclosed
6	Manny Onariase	(England)	CB/RB	21 October 1996 (age 30)	21	2	2020	(England) Dagenham & Redbridge	Undisclosed
12	Junior Brown	(England)	LB/LM/RM	7 May 1989 (age 37)	32	0	2020	Free Agent	Free
16	Lewis Butroid	(England)	LB/CB	16 September 1998 (age 28)	31	0	2017	Academy	Trainee
25	Jai Rowe	(England)	RB	8 August 2001 (age 25)	13	1	2019	(England) Barwell	Free
28	George Hornshaw	(England)	RB/RM/CM	20 January 2000 (age 26)	15	0	2018	Academy	Trainee
35	Charlie Barks	(England)	CB	19 August 2002 (age 24)	0	0	2020	Academy	Trainee
38	Mason O'Malley	(Republic of Ireland) (England)	LB	8 June 2001 (age 25)	17	0	2019	Huddersfield Town	Free
Midfielders
8	Alex Gilliead	(England)	RW/LW	11 February 1996 (age 30)	70	7	2019	(England) Shrewsbury Town	Undisclosed
11	Abo Eisa	(Sudan)	LW/RW	5 January 1996 (age 30)	61	15	2019	(England) Shrewsbury Town	Free
17	Andy Dales	(England)	LW/RW	13 November 1994 (age 31)	30	2	2018	(England) Mickleover Sports	Undisclosed
18	Jordan Hallam	(England)	AM/LW/RW	6 October 1998 (age 28)	17	2	2019	(England) Sheffield United	Free
20	Lewis Spence	(Scotland)	CM/DM	28 January 1996 (age 30)	27	0	2020	(Scotland) Ross County	Free
22	Alfie Beestin	(England)	AM/CF	1 October 1997 (age 29)	27	2	2020	(England) Tadcaster Albion	Undisclosed
23	Jem Karacan	(Turkey) (England)	CM/DM	21 February 1989 (age 37)	5	0	2020	Free Agent	Free
30	Tom Pugh	(Wales) (England)	CM/RB	27 September 2000 (age 26)	6	0	2019	Academy	Trainee
36	Finley Shrimpton	(England)	CM	24 August 2002 (age 24)	0	0	2020	Academy	Trainee
42	Raynner Silva	(England)	CM	10 September 2001 (age 25)	0	0	2020	Academy	Trainee
Forwards
9	Ryan Loft	(England)	CF	14 September 1997 (age 29)	28	7	2020	(England) Leicester City	Free
10	Kevin van Veen	(Netherlands)	CF	1 June 1991 (age 35)	167	41	2019	(England) Northampton Town	Undisclosed
14	Devarn Green	(England)	RW/LW/CF	26 August 1996 (age 30)	21	1	2020	(England) Southport	Undisclosed
15	Myles Hippolyte	(England)	LW/RW/CF	9 November 1994 (age 32)	17	1	2020	(England) Yeovil Town	Undisclosed
19	Aaron Jarvis	(England)	CF	24 January 1998 (age 28)	17	2	2020	(England) Sutton United	Free
21	Kelsey Mooney	(England)	CF	5 February 1999 (age 27)	0	0	2020	(England) Hereford	Free
24	Olufela Olomola	(England)	CF/SS/RW	5 September 1997 (age 29)	9	1	2018	(England) Southampton	Free
27	Kenan Dünnwald-Turan	(Germany)	CF/RW/LW	14 November 1995 (age 30)	6	0	2020	(Germany) Bonner SC	Free
40	Harry Jessop	(England)	CF	1 August 2002 (age 24)	0	0	2020	Academy	Trainee
45	John McAtee	(England)	SS/AM	23 July 1999 (age 27)	47	5	2019	(England) Shrewsbury Town	Free

=== Statistics ===
As of 30 January 2021

No.	Pos	Nat	Player	Total		League Two		FA Cup		League Cup		League Trophy	
No.	Pos	Nat	Player	Apps	Goals	Apps	Goals	Apps	Goals	Apps	Goals	Apps	Goals
1	GK	(England) ENG	Rory Watson	10	0	7+0	0	0+0	0	1+0	0	2+0	0
2	DF	(England) ENG	Jordan Clarke	12	1	12+0	1	0+0	0	0+0	0	0+0	0
3	DF	(England) ENG	George Taft	5	0	5+0	0	0+0	0	0+0	0	0+0	0
4	DF	(England) ENG	Jacob Bedeau	22	1	15+3	1	1+0	0	1+0	0	2+0	0
5	DF	(England) ENG	Harrison McGahey	10	0	9+0	0	0+0	0	0+0	0	1+0	0
6	DF	(England) ENG	Manny Onariase	21	2	17+2	2	0+0	0	0+0	0	1+1	0
8	MF	(England) ENG	Alex Gilliead	28	1	25+0	1	1+0	0	1+0	0	1+0	0
9	FW	(England) ENG	Ryan Loft	28	7	21+5	6	0+0	0	1+0	1	1+0	0
10	FW	(Netherlands) NED	Kevin van Veen	5	2	3+0	1	0+1	1	0+0	0	1+0	0
11	MF	(Sudan) SDN	Abo Eisa	26	6	18+6	6	0+0	0	1+0	0	1+0	0
12	DF	(England) ENG	Junior Brown	8	0	7+0	0	1+0	0	0+0	0	0+0	0
14	FW	(England) ENG	Devarn Green	20	1	8+8	1	1+0	0	0+1	0	2+0	0
15	FW	(England) ENG	Myles Hippolyte	17	1	10+5	1	0+0	0	0+0	0	1+1	0
16	DF	(England) ENG	Lewis Butroid	4	0	0+1	0	1+0	0	1+0	0	1+0	0
17	FW	(England) ENG	Andy Dales	2	0	0+0	0	0+0	0	0+0	0	2+0	0
18	MF	(England) ENG	Jordan Hallam	9	1	1+6	1	0+1	0	0+0	0	0+1	0
19	FW	(England) ENG	Aaron Jarvis	17	2	6+8	2	0+0	0	0+1	0	2+0	0
20	MF	(Scotland) SCO	Lewis Spence	26	0	20+3	0	1+0	0	1+0	0	1+0	0
22	MF	(England) ENG	Alfie Beestin	23	2	18+3	2	0+0	0	0+0	0	2+0	0
23	MF	(Turkey) TUR	Jem Karacan	4	0	4+0	0	0+0	0	0+0	0	0+0	0
24	FW	(England) ENG	Olufela Olomola	3	1	0+1	0	0+1	0	0+0	0	0+1	1
25	DF	(England) ENG	Jai Rowe	12	1	6+4	1	0+0	0	0+0	0	1+1	0
27	FW	(Germany) GER	Kenan Dünnwald	6	0	1+4	0	1+0	0	0+0	0	0+0	0
28	MF	(England) ENG	George Hornshaw	12	0	7+1	0	0+0	0	1+0	0	1+2	0
30	MF	(Wales) WAL	Tom Pugh	4	0	0+0	0	0+0	0	0+1	0	3+0	0
31	GK	(England) ENG	Adam Kelsey	1	0	0+0	0	0+0	0	0+0	0	1+0	0
33	GK	(England) ENG	Mark Howard	20	0	19+0	0	1+0	0	0+0	0	0+0	0
38	DF	(Republic of Ireland) IRL	Mason O'Malley	17	0	14+1	0	0+0	0	0+0	0	2+0	0
45	FW	(England) ENG	John McAtee	22	2	8+12	1	1+0	1	0+0	0	1+0	0
Players who left the club:
7	FW	(England) ENG	Ryan Colclough	2	0	0+0	0	0+0	0	1+0	0	1+0	0
23	MF	(England) ENG	Frank Vincent	10	0	7+1	0	0+0	0	1+0	0	0+1	0
26	DF	(England) ENG	Tyler Cordner	17	1	10+2	0	1+0	0	1+0	0	3+0	1
34	MF	(England) ENG	Jake Taylor	14	0	8+5	0	1+0	0	0+0	0	0+0	0

==== Goals record ====
As of 30 January 2021

Rank	No.	Nat.	Po.	Name	League Two	FA Cup	League Cup	League Trophy	Total
1	9	(England)	CF	Ryan Loft	6	0	1	0	7
2	11	(Sudan)	LM	Abo Eisa	6	0	0	0	6
3	6	(England)	CB	Manny Onariase	2	0	0	0	2
3	10	(Netherlands)	CF	Kevin van Veen	1	1	0	0	2
3	19	(England)	CF	Aaron Jarvis	2	0	0	0	2
3	22	(England)	AM	Alfie Beestin	2	0	0	0	2
3	45	(England)	CF	John McAtee	1	1	0	0	2
8	2	(England)	RB	Jordan Clarke	1	0	0	0	1
8	4	(England)	CB	Jacob Bedeau	1	0	0	0	1
8	8	(England)	RW	Alex Gilliead	1	0	0	0	1
8	14	(England)	CF	Devarn Green	1	0	0	0	1
8	15	(England)	LW	Myles Hippolyte	1	0	0	0	1
8	18	(England)	LW	Jordan Hallam	1	0	0	0	1
8	24	(England)	CF	Olufela Olomola	0	0	0	1	1
8	25	(England)	RB	Jai Rowe	1	0	0	0	1
8	26	(England)	CB	Tyler Cordner	0	0	0	1	1
Own Goals					1	0	0	0	1
Total					29	2	1	2	33

==== Disciplinary record ====
As of 30 January 2021

Rank	No.	Nat.	Po.	Name	League One			FA Cup			League Cup			League Trophy			Total		
Rank	No.	Nat.	Po.	Name	Yellow card	(yellow card) (yellow-red card)	Red card	Yellow card	(yellow card) (yellow-red card)	Red card	Yellow card	(yellow card) (yellow-red card)	Red card	Yellow card	(yellow card) (yellow-red card)	Red card	Yellow card	(yellow card) (yellow-red card)	Red card
1	9	(England)	CF	Ryan Loft	5	0	0	0	0	0	0	0	0	1	0	0	6	0	0
2	20	(Scotland)	CM	Lewis Spence	4	0	0	0	0	0	1	0	0	0	0	0	5	0	0
3	2	(England)	RB	Jordan Clarke	4	0	0	0	0	0	0	0	0	0	0	0	4	0	0
3	25	(England)	RB	Jai Rowe	3	0	0	0	0	0	0	0	0	1	0	0	4	0	0
5	4	(England)	CB	Jacob Bedeau	3	0	0	0	0	0	0	0	0	0	0	0	3	0	0
5	12	(England)	LB	Junior Brown	1	1	0	0	0	0	0	0	0	0	0	0	1	1	0
7	8	(England)	RM	Alex Gilliead	2	0	0	0	0	0	0	0	0	0	0	0	2	0	0
7	11	(Sudan)	LM	Abo Eisa	2	0	0	0	0	0	0	0	0	0	0	0	2	0	0
7	15	(England)	LW	Myles Hippolyte	0	1	0	0	0	0	0	0	0	0	0	0	0	1	0
7	19	(England)	CF	Aaron Jarvis	2	0	0	0	0	0	0	0	0	0	0	0	2	0	0
7	~~26~~	(England)	CB	Tyler Cordner	0	0	0	0	1	0	0	0	0	0	0	0	0	1	0
7	28	(England)	RB	George Hornshaw	2	0	0	0	0	0	0	0	0	0	0	0	2	0	0
14	~~7~~	(England)	RW	Ryan Colclough	0	0	0	0	0	0	1	0	0	0	0	0	1	0	0
14	22	(England)	AM	Alfie Beestin	1	0	0	0	0	0	0	0	0	0	0	0	1	0	0
14	23	(Turkey)	CM	Jem Karacan	1	0	0	0	0	0	0	0	0	0	0	0	1	0	0
14	~~34~~	(England)	CM	Jake Taylor	1	0	0	0	0	0	0	0	0	0	0	0	1	0	0
14	38	(Republic of Ireland)	LB	Mason O'Malley	0	0	0	0	0	0	0	0	0	1	0	0	1	0	0
14	45	(England)	SS	John McAtee	1	0	0	0	0	0	0	0	0	0	0	0	1	0	0
Total					33	2	0	0	1	0	2	0	0	3	0	0	38	3	0

== Transfers ==
=== Transfers in ===
Date	Position	Nationality	Name	From	Fee	Ref.
3 August 2020	CF	(England)	Aaron Jarvis	(England) Sutton United	Free transfer	
3 August 2020	CF	(England)	Kelsey Mooney	(England) Hereford	Free transfer	
3 August 2020	CB	(England)	Manny Onariase	(England) Dagenham & Redbridge	Undisclosed	
3 August 2020	CM	(Scotland)	Lewis Spence	(Scotland) Ross County	Free transfer	
29 August 2020	LW	(England)	Myles Hippolyte	(England) Yeovil Town	Undisclosed	
31 August 2020	CF	(England)	Ryan Loft	(England) Leicester City	Free transfer	
3 September 2020	CF	(Germany)	Kenan Dünnwald-Turan	(Germany) Bonner SC	Free transfer	
18 October 2020	LB	(England)	Junior Brown	(England) Coventry City	Free transfer	
22 October 2020	GK	(England)	Mark Howard	(England) Blackpool	Free transfer	
4 January 2021	CM	(Turkey)	Jem Karacan	Unattached	Free transfer	
1 February 2021	CB	(England)	George Taft	(England) Bolton Wanderers	Free transfer	

=== Loans in ===
Date from	Position	Nationality	Name	From	Date until	Ref.
6 August 2020	LM	(England)	Frank Vincent	(England) Bournemouth	5 January 2021	
20 August 2020	CB	(England)	Tyler Cordner	(England) Bournemouth	14 January 2021	
1 October 2020	CM	(England)	Jake Taylor	(England) Nottingham Forest	5 January 2021	
7 January 2021	CB	(England)	George Taft	(England) Bolton Wanderers	1 February 2021	
1 February 2021	RB	(England)	Teddy Howe	(England) Blackpool	End of season	

=== Loans out ===
Date from	Position	Nationality	Name	To	Date until	Ref.
25 September 2020	CB	(England)	Charlie Barks	(England) Frickley Athletic	October 2020	
25 September 2020	CM	(England)	Finley Shrimpton	(England) Frickley Athletic	October 2020	
5 October 2020	CF	(England)	Harry Jessop	(England) Pickering Town	November 2020	
16 October 2020	CF	(England)	Kelsey Mooney	(England) Hereford	2 January 2021	
13 November 2020	LW	(England)	Andy Dales	(England) Altrincham	December 2020	
27 February 2021	LB	(England)	Lewis Butroid	(England) Hereford	March 2021	

=== Transfers out ===
Date	Position	Nationality	Name	To	Fee	Ref.
1 July 2020	RW	(England)	Yasin Ben El-Mhanni	Unattached	Released	
1 July 2020	CB	(Australia)	Cameron Burgess	(England) Accrington Stanley	Released	
1 July 2020	CB	(England)	Andy Butler	(England) Doncaster Rovers	Released	
1 July 2020	MF	(England)	Luca Chadli	Unattached	Released	
1 July 2020	CB	(England)	Jo Cummings	(England) Radcliffe	Released	
1 July 2020	FW	(England)	Levi Gallimore	Unattached	Released	
1 July 2020	RW	(England)	Adam Hammill	(Republic of Ireland) Derry City	Released	
1 July 2020	DM	(England)	James Horsfield	(Wales) Wrexham	Released	
1 July 2020	RM	(England)	Jack Lambert	(Iceland) ÍBV.	Released	
1 July 2020	CB	(Northern Ireland)	Rory McArdle	(England) Exeter City	Released	
1 July 2020	LB	(South Africa)	Kgosi Ntlhe	(England) Barrow	Released	
1 July 2020	RB	(England)	James Perch	(England) Mansfield Town	Released	
1 July 2020	CF	(England)	Reon Potts	(England) York City	Released	
1 July 2020	CB	(Cameroon)	Yann Songo'o	(England) Morecambe	Released	
1 July 2020	RB	(England)	Levi Sutton	(England) Bradford City	Released	
1 July 2020	MF	(England)	Aidan Train	Unattached	Released	
16 October 2020	LW	(England)	Ryan Colclough	(England) Altrincham	Mutual consent	
