= Aaron Jarvis =

Aaron Jarvis may refer to:

- Aaron Jarvis (rugby union) (born 1986), Wales rugby union player
- Aaron Jarvis (footballer) (born 1998), English footballer
