= Jacob Bedeau =

Grenadian-English footballer (born 1999)

Personal information
- Full name: Jacob Mitchell Bedeau
- Date of birth: 24 December 1999 (age 26)
- Place of birth: Waltham Forest, England
- Height: 1.84 m (6 ft 0 in)
- Position: Defender

Team information
- Current team: Notts County
- Number: 4

Youth career
- –2016: Leyton Orient
- 2016–2017: Bury

Senior career*
Years	Team	Apps	(Gls)
2016–2017	Bury	7	(0)
2017–2019	Aston Villa	0	(0)
2019–2021	Scunthorpe United	45	(2)
2021–2022	Burnley	0	(0)
2022	→ Morecambe (loan)	22	(0)
2022–2024	Morecambe	82	(2)
2024–	Notts County	48	(0)

International career^{‡}
2023–	Grenada	3	(0)
- * Club domestic league appearances and goals as of 02:37, 17 August 2025 (UTC) ‡ National team caps and goals as of 09:59, 25 July 2025 (UTC)

Jacob Mitchell Bedeau (born 24 December 1999) is a professional footballer who plays as a defender for EFL League One club Notts County. Born in England, he represents the Grenada national team.

== Club career ==
=== Bury ===
Bedeau is a product of the Leyton Orient and Bury football academies, after impressing at a young age for Bury, debuting at sixteen. Bedeau was given his professional debut by caretaker-manager Chris Brass at the age of 16 in a League One tie against Millwall, in which Bury suffered a 3–2 defeat. After appearing on the Bury bench several times, Bedeau was given his next start in a 4–2 defeat against Bristol Rovers. He played a total of seven games for Bury.

=== Aston Villa ===
On 31 January 2017, Bedeau joined Championship club Aston Villa on a two-and-a-half-year deal for a fee around the margin of £900,000. Bedeau did not make any first team appearances in competitive games for Aston Villa, but was a main stay of the Under-23 squad, with 42 appearances, excluding cup matches. In his first full season with the 23s (2017–18) they won the Premier League Cup and finished runners up in the league. In one of his last appearances, he captained the squad to a 5–1 victory over Manchester United U23s.

=== Scunthorpe United ===
On 31 January 2019, Bedeau joined League One side Scunthorpe United. He started sparingly, making his debut in September 2019 in a 1–1 draw against Leicester City U21s, in the Football League Trophy. He started only two more games that calendar year, against Sunderland (in the Football League Trophy); and Walsall (in League Two). However, he became a regular starter by the end of the 2019–20 season and into the 2020–21 season. He scored his first professional goal in a 2–2 draw against Crewe Alexandra. He scored again in a 2–0 win against Oldham Athletic. He made a total of 53 appearances for Scunthorpe, 45 of them being in the league. He was one of 17 players released by Scunthorpe at the end of the 2020–21 season.

=== Burnley ===
Following his release from Scunthorpe he signed for Burnley on a two-year deal with the option of a further 12-months and was placed into the Under-23 squad.

=== Morecambe ===
On 4 January 2022, Bedeau joined EFL League One side Morecambe on loan for the remainder of the 2021–22 season. He started Morecambe's next game, which was a FA Cup tie against Tottenham Hotspur. Bedeau managed to keep a clean sheet, but came off after 65 minutes. Morecambe eventually lost 3–1. On 9 August 2022, Bedeau made his loan move to Morecambe permanent for an undisclosed fee.

=== Notts County ===
On 11 June 2024, Bedeau joined EFL League Two side Notts County on a three-year deal.

== International career ==
Born in England, Bedeau is of Grenadian descent. He was called up to the Grenada national team for a set of 2023–24 CONCACAF Nations League matches in September 2023.

== Career statistics ==
As of match played 8 March 2025

Appearances and goals by club, season and competition
Club	Season	League			FA Cup		EFL Cup		Other		Total	
Club	Season	Division	Apps	Goals	Apps	Goals	Apps	Goals	Apps	Goals	Apps	Goals
Bury	2016–17	League One	7	0	0	0	0	0	0	0	7	0
Aston Villa	2016–17	Championship	0	0	—		—		—		0	0
Aston Villa	2017–18	Championship	0	0	0	0	0	0	0	0	0	0
Aston Villa	2018–19	Championship	0	0	0	0	0	0	—		0	0
Aston Villa	Total		0	0	0	0	0	0	0	0	0	0
Scunthorpe United	2018–19	League One	0	0	—		—		—		0	0
Scunthorpe United	2019–20	League Two	11	1	0	0	0	0	4 (Note: Appearances in EFL Trophy)	0	15	1
Scunthorpe United	2020–21	League Two	34	1	1	0	1	0	2 (Note: Appearances in EFL Trophy)	0	38	1
Scunthorpe United	Total		45	2	1	0	1	0	6	0	53	2
Burnley	2021–22	Premier League	0	0	—		0	0	—		0	0
Morecambe (loan)	2021–22	League One	22	0	1	0	—		—		23	0
Morecambe	2022–23	League One	39	0	1	0	2	0	3	0	45	0
Morecambe	2023–24	League One	43	2	2	0	1	0	2	0	48	2
Morecambe	Total		82	2	3	0	3	0	5	0	93	2
Notts County	2024–25	League Two	32	0	2	0	1	0	0	0	35	0
Career total			188	4	7	0	5	0	11	0	211	4

== Honours ==
Notts County

- EFL League Two play-offs: 2026
