= Lewis Butroid =

English footballer

Personal information
- Full name: Lewis Malcolm Butroid
- Date of birth: 17 September 1998 (age 28)
- Place of birth: Gainsborough, England
- Height: 1.75 m (5 ft 9 in)
- Position: Left back

Team information
- Current team: Farsley Celtic

Youth career
- 2007–2016: Scunthorpe United

Senior career*
Years	Team	Apps	(Gls)
2016–2021	Scunthorpe United	18	(0)
2020	→ Spennymoor Town (loan)	4	(0)
2021	→ Hereford (loan)	0	(0)
2021–2022	Gainsborough Trinity	14	(1)
2022	Worksop Town	5	(1)
2022–2023	Farsley Celtic	53	(1)
2023–	Gainsborough Trinity	43	(4)
- * Club domestic league appearances and goals as of 22:55, 27 August 2024 (UTC)

Lewis Malcolm Butroid (born 17 September 1998) is an English professional footballer who plays as a left back for Gainsborough Trinity.

== Career ==
=== Scunthorpe United ===
Born in Gainsborough, Butroid joined Scunthorpe United's academy in 2007 at the age of nine. After progressing through the youth setup, he made his first team debut on 30 August 2016 by starting in a 2–1 home win against Middlesbrough U23 for the EFL Trophy.

On 26 January 2017, Butroid signed a professional 18-month deal with the Iron. He made his Football League debut on 23 September, playing the full 90 minutes in a 2–0 home success over Portsmouth.

He joined National League North side Spennymoor Town on loan in January 2020, but was recalled in February 2020 after making four appearances.

On 27 February 2021, Butroid joined National League North side Hereford on loan. He was released by Scunthorpe when his contract expired, at the end of the 2020–2021 season.

=== Non-League ===
On 20 August 2021, Butroid signed a contract for his hometown club Gainsborough Trinity, having previously been on trial with Grimsby Town.

On 18 January 2022, Butroid signed for Worksop Town.

On 22 February 2022, Butroid signed for National League North side Farsley Celtic. He was released by Farsley in May 2023.

== Career statistics ==
As of match played 26 August 2024

Appearances and goals by club, season and competition
Club	Season	League			FA Cup		EFL Cup		Other		Total	
Club	Season	Division	Apps	Goals	Apps	Goals	Apps	Goals	Apps	Goals	Apps	Goals
Scunthorpe United	2016–17	League One	0	0	0	0	0	0	1 (Note: Appearance(s) in EFL Trophy)	0	1	0
Scunthorpe United	2017–18	League One	7	0	0	0	0	0	4	0	11	0
Scunthorpe United	2018–19	League One	6	0	1	0	1	0	2	0	10	0
Scunthorpe United	2019–20	League Two	4	0	0	0	0	0	1	0	5	0
Scunthorpe United	2020–21	League Two	1	0	1	0	1	0	1	0	4	0
Scunthorpe United	Total		18	0	2	0	2	0	9	0	31	0
Spennymoor Town (loan)	2019–20	National League North	4	0	0	0	—		0	0	4	0
Hereford (loan)	2020–21	National League North	0	0	0	0	—		3 (Note: Appearances in FA Trophy)	0	3	0
Gainsborough Trinity	2021–22	NPL Premier Division	14	1	0	0	—		1	0	15	1
Worksop Town	2021–22	NPL Division One East	No data available									
Farsley Celtic	2021–22	National League North	15	0	0	0	—		0	0	15	0
Farsley Celtic	2022–23	National League North	38	1	0	0	—		5	0	43	1
Farsley Celtic	Total		53	1	0	0	—		5	0	58	1
Gainsborough Trinity	2023–24	NPL Premier Division	37	3	2	0	—		1 (Note: Appearance in Lincolnshire Senior Cup)	0	40	3
Gainsborough Trinity	2024–25	NPL Premier Division	6	1	0	0	—		0	0	6	1
Gainsborough Trinity	Total		43	4	2	0	—		1	0	46	4
Career total			132	6	4	0	2	0	19	0	157	6

== Honours ==
Individual

- League One Apprentice of the Year: 2016–17
