= Mason O'Malley =

English association football player

Personal information
- Full name: Mason Lewis O'Malley
- Date of birth: 8 June 2001 (age 25)
- Place of birth: Leeds, England
- Position: Left-back

Team information
- Current team: Worksop Town

Youth career
- –2015: Hunslet
- 2015–2019: Huddersfield Town
- 2019–2020: Scunthorpe United

Senior career*
Years	Team	Apps	(Gls)
2020–2023	Scunthorpe United	74	(0)
2023	→ Ilkeston Town (loan)	8	(0)
2023–2024	Bradford (Park Avenue)	28	(1)
2024–	Worksop Town	5	(0)

International career^{‡}
2021	Republic of Ireland U21	1	(0)
- * Club domestic league appearances and goals as of 17:32, 25 November 2024 (UTC) ‡ National team caps and goals as of 00:22, 27 March 2021 (UTC)

Mason Lewis O'Malley (born 8 June 2001) is a footballer who plays as a left-back for Worksop Town. Born in England, he represents the Republic of Ireland at youth international level.

== Club career ==
Born in Leeds, O'Malley signed for the academy of Huddersfield Town from Hunslet Boys at under-14 level. He was released by Huddersfield Town in summer 2019, and signed for Scunthorpe United's under-23 squad in July 2019. O'Malley made his professional debut with Scunthorpe United in a 1–1 (4–2) EFL Trophy penalty shootout loss to Lincoln City on 8 September 2020. He signed a contract extension in December 2020, keeping him at the club until summer 2023.

In February 2023, O'Malley signed for Ilkeston Town on an initial one-month loan deal alongside teammate Jordan Hallam.

Following his release from Scunthorpe, O'Malley signed for Bradford (Park Avenue) on 1 August 2023.

In September 2024, O'Malley joined Northern Premier League Premier Division side Worksop Town.

== International career ==
O'Malley is of Irish descent, and trained with the Ireland U16s in 2016.

O'Malley made his Republic Of Ireland U21s debut in a friendly vs. Wales U21s on 26 March 2021.

== Career statistics ==
As of end of 2023–24 season

Appearances and goals by club, season and competition
Club	Season	League			FA Cup		League Cup		Other		Total	
Club	Season	Division	Apps	Goals	Apps	Goals	Apps	Goals	Apps	Goals	Apps	Goals
Scunthorpe United	2020–21	League Two	29	0	0	0	0	0	2 (Note: Appearance(s) in EFL Trophy)	0	31	0
Scunthorpe United	2021–22	League Two	25	0	1	0	1	0	1	0	28	0
Scunthorpe United	2022–23	National League	21	0	1	0	—		0	0	22	0
Scunthorpe United	Total		75	0	2	0	1	0	3	0	81	0
Ilkeston Town	2022–23	Southern Premier Division Central	8	0	0	0	—		0	0	8	0
Bradford (Park Avenue)	2023–24	NPL Premier Division	28	1	1	0	—		0	0	29	1
Career total			111	1	3	0	1	0	3	0	118	1
