= George Hornshaw =

English footballer

Personal information
- Full name: George Matthew Hornshaw
- Date of birth: 20 January 2000 (age 26)
- Place of birth: Beverley, England
- Position: Midfielder

Team information
- Current team: Gainsborough Trinity

Youth career
- 2011–2017: Scunthorpe United

Senior career*
Years	Team	Apps	(Gls)
2017–2021	Scunthorpe United	8	(0)
2018	→ Farsley Celtic (loan)		
2019	→ Gainsborough Trinity (loan)		
2021–2022	Gainsborough Trinity	36	(1)
2022	Farsley Celtic	2	(0)
2022–	Gainsborough Trinity	0	(0)
- * Club domestic league appearances and goals as of 18:44, 5 September 2022 (UTC)

George Matthew Hornshaw (born 20 January 2000) is an English professional footballer who plays as a midfielder for Gainsborough Trinity.

== Career ==
In November 2011, Hornshaw joined Scunthorpe United as an under-12. In 2018, after featuring in the EFL Trophy for Scunthorpe, Hornshaw signed his first professional contract with the club. In the 2018–19 season, Hornshaw joined both Farsley Celtic and Gainsborough Trinity on loan.

He was one of 17 players released by Scunthorpe at the end of the 2020–21 season.

On 28 July 2021, Hornshaw signed for Gainsborough Trinity having been released by Scunthorpe.

On 30 June 2022, Hornshaw returned to National League North club Farsley Celtic having previously spent time with the club on loan. In September 2022, Hornshaw returned to Gainsborough Trinity.

== Career statistics ==
As of match played 29 December 2020

Appearances and goals by club, season and competition
Club	Season	League			FA Cup		EFL Cup		Other		Total	
Club	Season	Division	Apps	Goals	Apps	Goals	Apps	Goals	Apps	Goals	Apps	Goals
Scunthorpe United	2017–18	League One	0	0	0	0	0	0	1 (Note: Appearance(s) in EFL Trophy)	0	1	0
Scunthorpe United	2018–19	League One	0	0	0	0	0	0	1	0	1	0
Scunthorpe United	2019–20	League Two	0	0	0	0	0	0	1	0	1	0
Scunthorpe United	2020–21	League Two	8	0	0	0	1	0	3	0	12	0
Career total			8	0	0	0	1	0	6	0	15	0
