= Tyler Cordner =

English footballer (born 1998)

Personal information
- Full name: Tyler Jack Cordner
- Date of birth: 4 December 1998 (age 27)
- Place of birth: Southampton, England
- Height: 5 ft 11 in (1.80 m)
- Position: Central defender

Team information
- Current team: AFC Totton

Youth career
- Bournemouth

Senior career*
Years	Team	Apps	(Gls)
2018–2021	Bournemouth	0	(0)
2018–2019	→ Havant & Waterlooville (loan)	34	(4)
2019–2020	→ Ebbsfleet United (loan)	20	(0)
2020–2021	→ Scunthorpe United (loan)	12	(0)
2021	→ Southend United (loan)	14	(1)
2021–2022	Weymouth	41	(3)
2022–2023	Aldershot Town	45	(8)
2023–2026	York City	22	(2)
2024–2025	→ Ebbsfleet United (loan)	16	(1)
2025–2026	→ AFC Totton (loan)	42	(3)
2026–	AFC Totton	0	(0)

International career^{‡}
2023–	England C	1	(0)
- * Club domestic league appearances and goals as of 13:26, 18 August 2026 (UTC) ‡ National team caps and goals as of 22:00, 21 March 2023 (UTC)

Tyler Jack Cordner (born 4 December 1998) is an English professional footballer who plays for AFC Totton, as a central defender.

== Career ==
=== AFC Bournemouth ===
Born in Southampton, Cordner began his career at Bournemouth. He spent the 2018–19 season on loan at Havant & Waterlooville, and moved on loan to Ebbsfleet United in September 2019, returning to Bournemouth in January 2020. He signed on loan for Scunthorpe United in August 2020. He scored his first goal for Scunthorpe in an EFL Trophy tie against Lincoln City on 8 September 2020. After being recalled by Bournemouth on 14 January, he moved on loan to Southend United later that month.

=== Weymouth ===
In July 2021, following his release from Bournemouth, Cordner joined National League side Weymouth. He made 41 league appearances and scored three goals during the 2021–22 season. On 16 June 2022, it was confirmed that Cordner had left Weymouth following their relegation to the National League South that season.

=== Aldershot Town ===
On 16 June 2022, it was announced that Cordner had joined Aldershot Town of the National League on a two-year contract. He made his debut for England C on 21 March 2023.

=== York City ===
On 7 July 2023, Cordner signed for fellow National League club York City for an undisclosed fee.

In June 2024 he returned on loan to Ebbsfleet United on a season-long loan.

On 18 July 2025, Cordner joined National League South side AFC Totton on a season-long loan deal.

On 11 May 2026, York announced it was releasing him.

He signed permanently for AFC Totton in July 2026.

== Career statistics ==
As of end of 2023–24 season

Appearances and goals by club, season and competition
Club	Season	League			FA Cup		League Cup		Other		Total	
Club	Season	Division	Apps	Goals	Apps	Goals	Apps	Goals	Apps	Goals	Apps	Goals
AFC Bournemouth	2018–19	Premier League	0	0	0	0	0	0	—		0	0
AFC Bournemouth	2019–20	Premier League	0	0	0	0	0	0	—		0	0
AFC Bournemouth	2020–21	Championship	0	0	0	0	0	0	0	0	0	0
AFC Bournemouth	Total		0	0	0	0	0	0	0	0	0	0
Havant & Waterlooville (loan)	2018–19	National League	34	4	0	0	—		2 (Note: Appearances in FA Trophy)	0	36	4
Ebbsfleet United (loan)	2019–20	National League	20	0	3	0	—		1	0	24	0
Scunthorpe United (loan)	2020–21	League Two	12	0	1	0	1	0	3 (Note: Appearances in EFL Trophy)	1	17	1
Southend United (loan)	2020–21	League Two	14	1	0	0	0	0	0	0	14	1
Weymouth	2021–22	National League	41	3	2	0	—		2	0	45	3
Aldershot Town	2022–23	National League	45	8	1	0	—		4	1	50	9
York City	2023–24	National League	22	2	5	1	—		1	0	28	3
Career total			188	18	12	1	1	0	13	2	214	21

== Honours ==
Individual

- Aldershot Town Player of the Season: 2022–23
