= Tom Pugh (footballer) =

Footballer (born 2000)

Personal information
- Full name: Thomas Edward Pugh
- Date of birth: 27 September 2000 (age 26)
- Place of birth: Doncaster, England
- Height: 5 ft 10 in (1.78 m)
- Position: Midfielder

Team information
- Current team: Spalding United

Youth career
- –2017: Leeds United
- 2017–2019: Scunthorpe United

Senior career*
Years	Team	Apps	(Gls)
2018–2022	Scunthorpe United	26	(0)
2022	Scarborough Athletic	1	(0)
2022–2024	Scunthorpe United	45	(0)
2023–2024	→ Hereford (loan)	12	(1)
2024–	FC Halifax Town	45	(2)
2025–2026	→ Spennymoor Town (loan)	15	(1)
2026	→ Spalding United (loan)	12	(3)
2026–	Spalding United	10	(0)

International career
2019	Wales U21	2	(1)
- * Club domestic league appearances and goals as of 18:10, 26 September 2026 (UTC)

Thomas Edward Pugh (born 27 September 2000) is a footballer who plays as a midfielder for National League North club Spalding United.

== Club career ==
Born in Doncaster, Pugh joined the academy of Scunthorpe United in February 2017 after previously being at Leeds United. He signed his first professional contract with Scunthorpe in March 2019.

Pugh made his first-team debut for Scunthorpe United as an 86th-minute substitute for Clayton Lewis in a 3–2 defeat at Mansfield Town in the EFL Trophy on 13 November 2018. He made his first appearance at Glanford Park in the same competition on 12 November 2019, coming on as an 89-minute substitute for Matty Lund in a 3–0 win over Sunderland.

In May 2021, Pugh signed a new one-year contract with Scunthorpe.

On 8 February 2022, Pugh picked up a knee injury in a win against Walsall which ruled him out for the rest of the 2021–22 season.

At the end of the 2021–22 season, Pugh was released by Scunthorpe.

On 8 September 2022, Pugh signed for National League North club Scarborough Athletic on a non-contract basis. On 22 September 2022, having featured twice for Scarborough Athletic, Pugh returned to former club Scunthorpe United.

On 7 November 2023, Pugh joined fellow National League North club Hereford on a one-month loan. The loan was extended by a further month on 8 December. After he was due to return to Scunthorpe, it was announced that Pugh would stay at Hereford until the end of the season. On 23 January, less than two weeks into his loan extension, he was recalled from his loan. At the end of the 2023–24 season, Scunthorpe announced he was to be released upon expiry of his contract.

On 30 May 2024, Pugh joined National League club FC Halifax Town, signing a two-year contract.

In September 2025, he joined National League North club Spennymoor Town on loan until January 2026.

== International career ==
Pugh was called up by Rob Page for the Wales under-21 team in May 2019, having been eligible due to his Welsh father. He scored on his debut after coming on as a 60th-minute substitute in what finished as a 2–1 defeat to Albania.

== Career statistics ==
As of match played 26 September 2026

Appearances and goals by club, season and competition
Club	Season	League			FA Cup		EFL Cup		Other		Total	
Club	Season	Division	Apps	Goals	Apps	Goals	Apps	Goals	Apps	Goals	Apps	Goals
Scunthorpe United	2018–19	League One	0	0	0	0	0	0	1 (Note: Appearance(s) in EFL Trophy)	0	1	0
Scunthorpe United	2019–20	League Two	1	0	0	0	0	0	1	0	2	0
Scunthorpe United	2020–21	League Two	1	0	0	0	1	0	3	0	5	0
Scunthorpe United	2021–22	League Two	24	0	1	0	1	0	2	0	28	0
Scunthorpe United	Total		26	0	1	0	2	0	7	0	36	0
Scarborough Athletic	2022–23	National League North	1	0	1	0	—		—		2	0
Scunthorpe United	2022–23	National League	28	0	—		—		1 (Note: Appearance(s) in FA Trophy)	0	29	0
Scunthorpe United	2023–24	National League North	17	0	0	0	—		2 (Note: Appearances in Lincolnshire Senior Cup)	0	19	0
Scunthorpe United	Total		45	0	0	0	—		3	0	48	0
Hereford (loan)	2023–24	National League North	12	1	—		—		3	2	15	3
FC Halifax Town	2024–25	National League	39	2	0	0	—		5 (Note: Three appearances in National League Cup, one appearance in FA Trophy, one appearance in National League play-offs)	0	44	2
FC Halifax Town	2025–26	National League	6	0	0	0	—		0	0	6	0
FC Halifax Town	Total		45	2	0	0	0	0	5	0	50	2
Spennymoor Town (loan)	2025–26	National League North	15	1	1	0	—		0	0	16	1
Spalding United (loan)	2025–26	SL Premier Division Central	12	3	—		—		2 (Note: Appearances in Southern League Premier Division Central play-offs)	0	14	3
Spalding United	2026–27	National League North	10	0	0	0	—		0	0	10	0
Career total			166	7	3	0	2	0	20	2	191	9
