= Manny Onariase =

English footballer

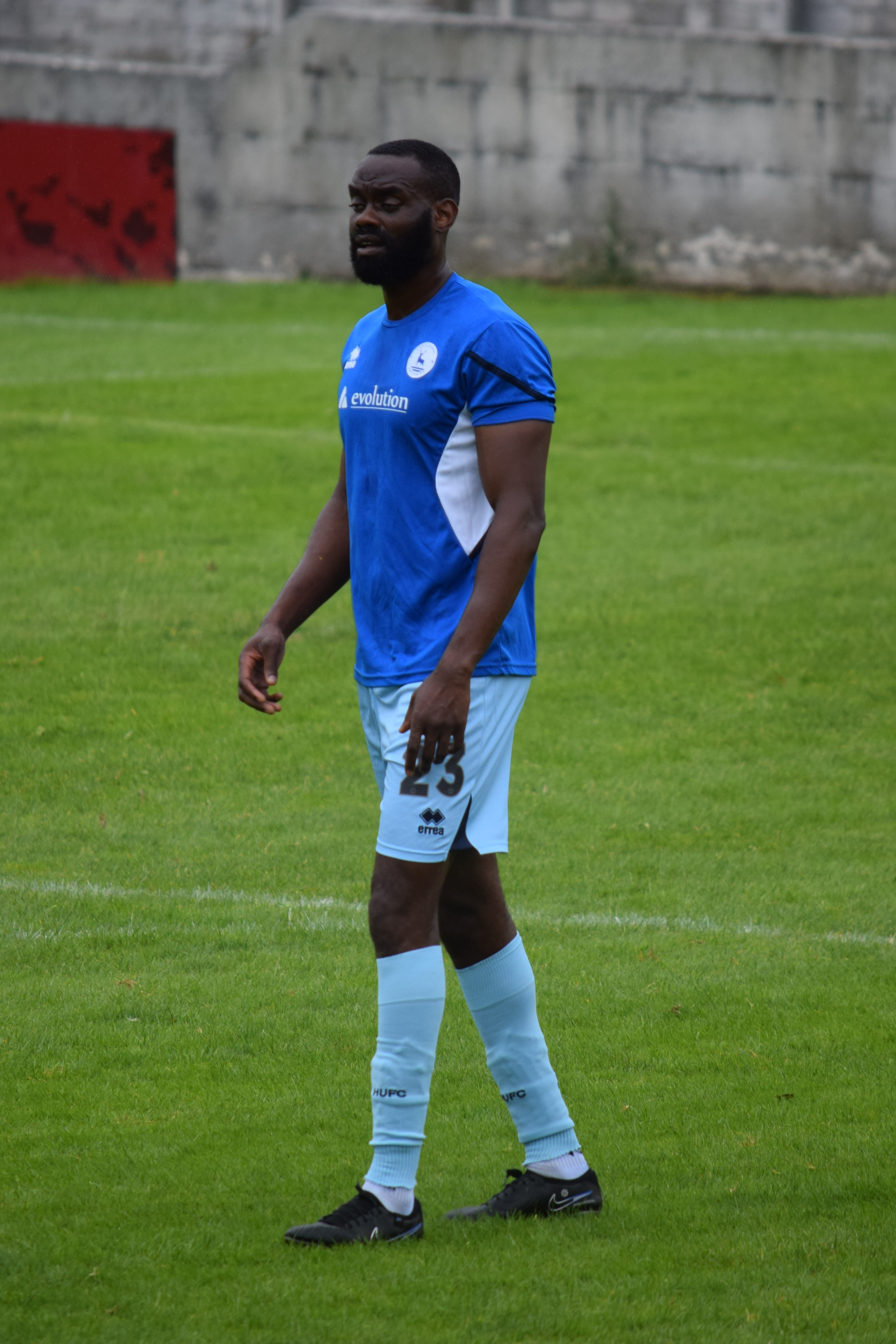
- Onariase warming up for Hartlepool United in 2024.

Personal information
- Full name: Osaore Emmanuel Onariase
- Date of birth: 21 October 1996 (age 30)
- Place of birth: Croydon, England
- Height: 1.88 m (6 ft 2 in)
- Position: Central defender

Team information
- Current team: Maidenhead United
- Number: 30

Youth career
- 2009–2015: West Ham United

Senior career*
Years	Team	Apps	(Gls)
2015–2016	West Ham United	0	(0)
2016–2017	Brentford	0	(0)
2017	→ Cheltenham Town (loan)	22	(1)
2017–2019	Rotherham United	0	(0)
2018	→ Cheltenham Town (loan)	5	(0)
2018–2019	→ Dagenham & Redbridge (loan)	29	(0)
2019–2020	Dagenham & Redbridge	28	(2)
2020–2022	Scunthorpe United	56	(4)
2022–2023	Dagenham & Redbridge	44	(2)
2023–2025	Hartlepool United	38	(0)
2024–2025	→ Maidenhead United (loan)	20	(1)
2025–	Maidenhead United	30	(1)
- * Club domestic league appearances and goals as of 06:27, 2 May 2026 (UTC)

Osaore Emmanuel Onariase (born 21 October 1996) is an English professional footballer who plays as a central defender. He plays for National League South club Maidenhead United.

Born in Croydon, Onariase came through the ranks at West Ham United, signing his first professional contract in April 2015. He subsequently joined Brentford in 2016. After a loan spell with Cheltenham Town, Onarise left Brentford and joined Rotherham United. Further loan spells came with Cheltenham Town and Dagenham & Redbridge. In 2019, Onarise signed permanently for Dagenham for one season, before returning to the Football League with Scunthorpe United. After two seasons with Scunthorpe, he signed for Dagenham for a third time. He spent two seasons with Dagenham & Redbridge before signing for Hartlepool United in 2023.

== Career ==
=== West Ham United ===
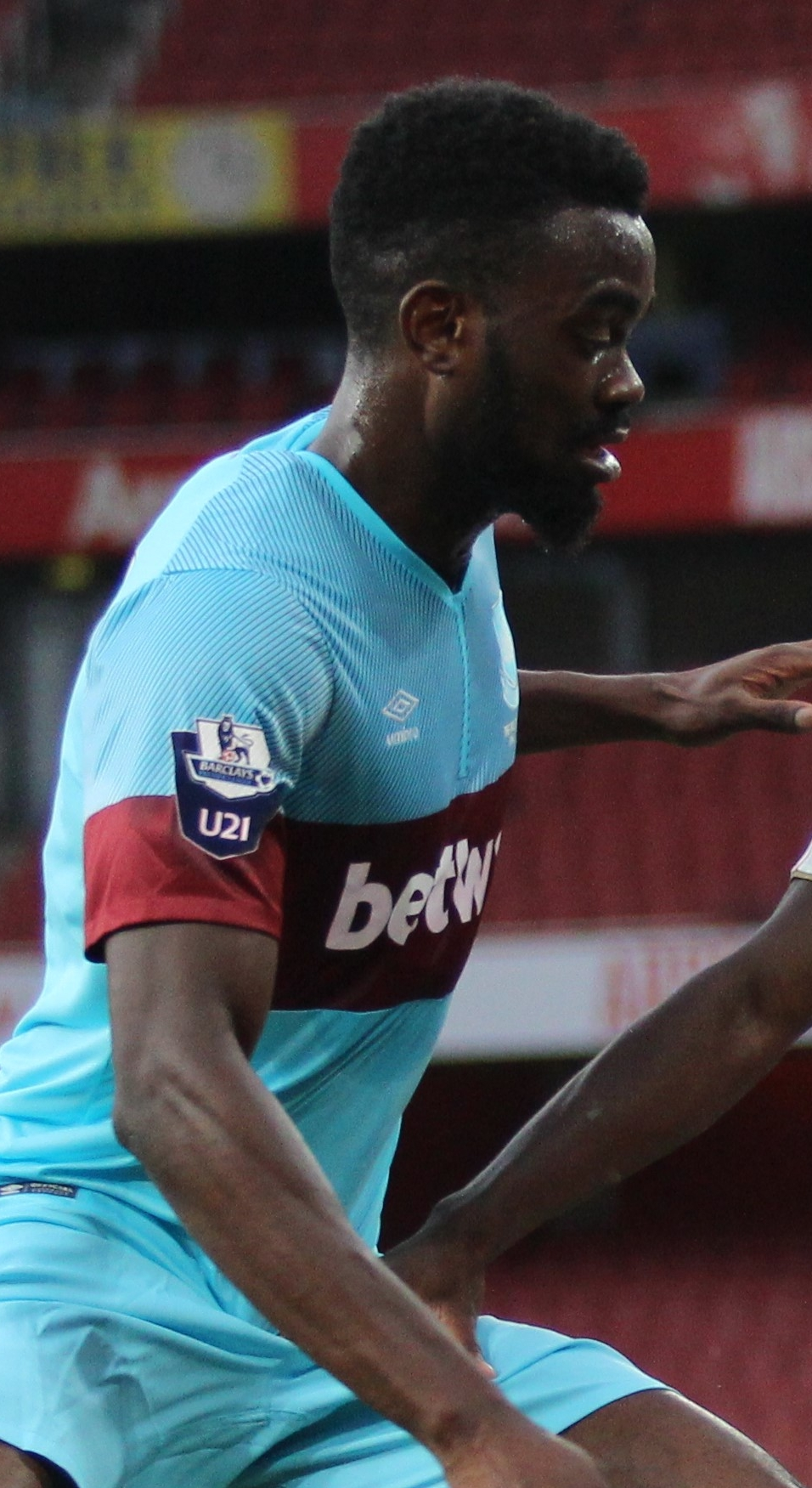
Onariase playing for West Ham United U21 in 2015.

After failing a trial with Premier League club West Ham United and subsequently spending time with rival London club Millwall, Onariase re-signed for the Hammers at the age of 12. Originally a midfielder, he progressed through the academy and was developed into a central defender at U14 and U15 level. Despite only being signed to a schoolboy contract, Onariase received his maiden call into the first team squad for a Premier League match versus Arsenal on 14 March 2015 and remained an unused substitute during the 3–0 defeat. Onariase signed his first professional contract in April 2015, but elected to depart Upton Park in January 2016.

=== Brentford ===
On 29 January 2016, Onariase signed an 18-month contract with the Development Squad at Championship club Brentford for an undisclosed fee. After good performances for the B team early in the 2016–17 season, suspension to Harlee Dean saw Onariase receive his maiden first team call up versus Derby County on 18 October 2016 and he remained an unused substitute during the 0–0 draw. Onariase was an unused substitute on two further occasions and on 1 January 2017, he joined League Two strugglers Cheltenham Town on loan until the end of the 2016–17 season. He made the first senior appearance of his career the following day with a start in a 2–0 defeat to Colchester United. Onariase scored the first senior goal of his career with a late consolation in a 2–1 defeat to Notts County on 11 February. He finished the season with 24 appearances.

After signing a new two-year contract on 22 June 2017, Onariase was included in the first team squad for its 2017–18 pre-season training camp in France. He failed to win a further first team call up before departing Griffin Park on 31 August 2017.

=== Rotherham United ===
On 31 August 2017, Onariase joined League One club Rotherham United on a two-year contract for an undisclosed fee. After making two EFL Trophy appearances and receiving just one call into a league squad, Onariase re-joined League Two club Cheltenham Town on loan on 1 January 2018. He made just five appearances during the remainder of the 2017–18 season.

After the Millers' promotion to the Championship for the 2018–19 season, a failure to make an appearance during the first two months of the campaign saw Onariase depart the New York Stadium on loan for the remainder of the season in October 2018. He was released when his contract expired at the end of the 2018–19 season.

=== Dagenham & Redbridge ===
On 25 October 2018, Onariase joined National League club Dagenham & Redbridge on a loan which was later extended until the end of the 2018–19 season. He made 31 appearances during his spell and signed a one-year contract with the club on 4 July 2019. Onariase made 32 appearances and scored two goals during the truncated 2019–20 season. He departed the Daggers in August 2020 and made 63 appearances and scored two goals during his two spells at Victoria Road.

=== Scunthorpe United ===
On 3 August 2020, Onariase signed a two-year contract with League Two club Scunthorpe United for an undisclosed fee. During a relegation-threatened 2020–21 season affected by hernia problems, he made 28 appearances and scored two goals. Onariase made 34 appearances and scored two goals during the 2021–22 season and departed the club in March 2022. He made 62 appearances and scored four goals during his time at Glanford Park.

=== Return to Dagenham & Redbridge ===
On 15 March 2022, Onariase returned to National League club Dagenham & Redbridge for an undisclosed fee and signed a contract running until the end of the 2023–24 season. He made 10 appearances and scored one goal during what remained of a 2021–22 season in which the Daggers finished one place outside the playoff zone.

=== Hartlepool United ===
On 17 July 2023, Onariase signed for Hartlepool United ahead of their first season back in the National League following relegation. He made his Hartlepool debut on the opening match of the 2023–24 season in a 3–2 away defeat to Barnet. At the end of the season, Onariase was made available for transfer by the club.

He made four substitute appearances for Hartlepool early in the 2024–25 season before joining Maidenhead United on loan in December. The following month, this deal was extended until the end of the season. He made 20 league appearances for Maidenhead, however, they were unable to avoid relegation to the National League South. At the end of the 2024–25 season, it was announced that he would be released by Hartlepool at the end of his contract. He made 41 appearances in total for Hartlepool.

=== Maidenhead United ===
On 24 June 2025, he signed permanently for National League South side Maidenhead United after loan spells with the club during the previous season.

== Personal life ==
Onariase attended St Thomas the Apostle College and was head boy. He is of Nigerian descent.

== Career statistics ==
As of end of 2025-26 season

Appearances and goals by club, season and competition
Club	Season	League			FA Cup		League Cup		Other		Total	
Club	Season	Division	Apps	Goals	Apps	Goals	Apps	Goals	Apps	Goals	Apps	Goals
West Ham United	2015–16	Premier League	0	0	0	0	0	0	0	0	0	0
Brentford	2016–17	Championship	0	0	—		0	0	—		0	0
Cheltenham Town (loan)	2016–17	League Two	22	1	—		—		2 (Note: Appearance(s) in EFL Trophy)	0	24	1
Rotherham United	2017–18	League One	0	0	0	0	0	0	2	0	2	0
Rotherham United	2018–19	Championship	0	0	—		0	0	—		0	0
Rotherham United	Total		0	0	0	0	0	0	2	0	2	0
Cheltenham Town (loan)	2017–18	League Two	5	0	—		—		—		5	0
Dagenham & Redbridge (loan)	2018–19	National League	29	0	—		—		2 (Note: Appearance(s) in FA Trophy)	0	31	0
Dagenham & Redbridge	2019–20	National League	28	2	1	0	—		3	0	32	2
Dagenham & Redbridge	Total		57	2	1	0	—		5	0	63	2
Scunthorpe United	2020–21	League Two	26	2	0	0	0	0	2	0	28	2
Scunthorpe United	2021–22	League Two	30	2	1	0	1	0	2	0	34	2
Scunthorpe United	Total		56	4	1	0	1	0	4	0	62	4
Dagenham & Redbridge	2021–22	National League	10	1	—		—		—		10	1
Dagenham & Redbridge	2022–23	National League	34	1	4	0	—		1	0	39	1
Dagenham & Redbridge	Total		44	2	4	0	—		1	0	49	2
Hartlepool United	2023–24	National League	34	0	1	0	—		2	0	37	0
Hartlepool United	2024–25	National League	4	0	0	0	—		0	0	4	0
Hartlepool United	Total		38	0	1	0	—		2	0	41	0
Maidenhead United (loan)	2024–25	National League	20	1	0	0	—		2 (Note: Appearances in National League Cup)	0	22	1
Maidenhead United	2025–26	National League South	30	1	1	0	—		2 (Note: One appearance in Berks & Bucks Senior Cup, one appearance in National League South playoffs)	0	33	1
Career total			272	11	8	0	1	0	20	0	291	11
