= Jordan Hallam =

English footballer

Personal information
- Full name: Jordan Paul Hallam
- Date of birth: 6 October 1998 (age 28)
- Place of birth: Sheffield, England
- Height: 5 ft 8 in (1.73 m)
- Position: Midfielder

Team information
- Current team: Gainsborough Trinity (on loan from Basford United)

Youth career
- Sheffield United

Senior career*
| Years | Team | Apps | (Gls) |
| 2016–2019 | Sheffield United | 0 | (0) |
| 2017 | → Southport (loan) | 10 | (2) |
| 2018 | → Viking (loan) | 5 | (0) |
| 2018 | → Chesterfield (loan) | 3 | (1) |
| 2019–2023 | Scunthorpe United | 29 | (3) |
| 2023 | → Ilkeston Town (loan) | 6 | (2) |
| 2023 | Ilkeston Town | 10 | (1) |
| 2023– | Basford United | 54 | (19) |
| 2025– | → Gainsborough Trinity (loan) | 1 | (0) |
- * Club domestic league appearances and goals as of 12:08, 2 March 2025 - 2025

Jordan Paul Hallam (born 6 October 1998) is an English professional footballer who plays as a midfielder for Gainsborough Trinity on loan from Northern Premier League Division One Midlands club Basford United.

== Career ==
Born in Sheffield, Hallam came through the Academy at Sheffield United to make his senior debut for the "Blades" in a 4–2 victory over Grimsby Town in an EFL Trophy match on 9 November 2016.

On 24 February 2018, Hallam attended a trial with Norwegian second tier team Viking. Approximately two weeks later he agreed to go on loan to Viking until the end of June. Viking had the option to sign him permanently after his loan expired, but decided not to do so.

On 23 November 2018, Hallam joined National League side Chesterfield on a one-month loan deal. A day later, he scored on his debut in a 1–1 draw with Eastleigh.

On 25 January 2019, Hallam joined Scunthorpe United on a free transfer.

In February 2023, having recently returned from a long-term injury, Hallam joined Ilkeston Town on an initial one-month loan deal alongside teammate Mason O'Malley. He was released following Scunthorpe's relegation at the end of the 2022–23 season.

In October 2023, Hallam joined Northern Premier League Premier Division side Basford United. In February 2025, Hallam joined Gainsborough Trinity on an initial one-month loan deal.

== Career statistics ==
As of end of 2022–23 season

Appearances and goals by club, season and competition
| Club | Season | League | | | FA Cup | | EFL Cup | | Other | | Total | |
| Club | Season | Division | Apps | Goals | Apps | Goals | Apps | Goals | Apps | Goals | Apps | Goals |
|---|---|---|---|---|---|---|---|---|---|---|---|---|
| Sheffield United | 2016–17 | League One | 0 | 0 | 0 | 0 | 0 | 0 | 1 (Note: Appearance in the EFL Trophy.) | 0 | 1 | 0 |
| Southport (loan) | 2017–18 | National League North | 10 | 2 | 0 | 0 | — | | 0 | 0 | 10 | 2 |
| Viking (loan) | 2018 | Norwegian First Division | 5 | 0 | 1 | 0 | — | | — | | 6 | 0 |
| Chesterfield (loan) | 2018–19 | National League | 3 | 1 | 1 | 0 | — | | 1 (Note: Appearances in FA Trophy) | 0 | 5 | 1 |
| Scunthorpe United | 2018–19 | League One | 7 | 1 | 0 | 0 | 0 | 0 | 0 | 0 | 7 | 1 |
| Scunthorpe United | 2019–20 | League Two | 0 | 0 | 0 | 0 | 0 | 0 | 1 | 0 | 1 | 0 |
| Scunthorpe United | 2020–21 | League Two | 13 | 2 | 1 | 0 | 0 | 0 | 1 | 0 | 15 | 2 |
| Scunthorpe United | 2021–22 | League Two | 8 | 0 | 0 | 0 | 0 | 0 | 1 | 0 | 9 | 0 |
| Scunthorpe United | 2022–23 | National League | 1 | 0 | 0 | 0 | — | | 0 | 0 | 1 | 0 |
| Scunthorpe United | Total | | 29 | 3 | 1 | 0 | 0 | 0 | 3 | 0 | 33 | 3 |
| Ilkeston Town (loan) | 2022–23 | Southern League Premier Division Central | 6 | 2 | 0 | 0 | — | | 0 | 0 | 6 | 2 |
| Ilkeston Town | 2023–24 | Northern Premier League Premier Division | 10 | 1 | 1 | 0 | — | | 1 | 2 | 12 | 3 |
| Ilkeston Town | Total | | 16 | 3 | 1 | 0 | 0 | 0 | 1 | 2 | 18 | 5 |
| Basford United | 2023–24 | Northern Premier League Premier Division | 14 | 4 | 0 | 0 | — | | 0 | 0 | 14 | 4 |
| Career total | | | 77 | 13 | 4 | 0 | 0 | 0 | 6 | 2 | 87 | 15 |
