= Andy Dales =

English footballer

Personal information
- Full name: Andrew Dales
- Date of birth: 13 November 1994 (age 31)
- Place of birth: Derby, England
- Height: 5 ft 11 in (1.80 m)
- Position: Winger

Team information
- Current team: Mickleover

Youth career
- 2004–2014: Derby County

Senior career*
Years	Team	Apps	(Gls)
2014–2018	Mickleover Sports		
2018–2021	Scunthorpe United	23	(1)
2019	→ Dundee (loan)	10	(0)
2020	→ Hamilton Academical (loan)	2	(0)
2020	→ Altrincham (loan)	3	(0)
2021–	Mickleover		

International career
- England C
- * Club domestic league appearances and goals as of 07:42, 30 August 2021 (UTC)

Andrew Dales (born 13 November 1994) is an English professional footballer who plays for Mickleover as a winger.

== Club career ==
Born in Derby, Dales spent 10 years with the youth team of Derby County after joining at the age of 9. He was offered a professional contract by Derby in 2013.

He then played non-League football with Mickleover Sports, and trained with the V9 Academy, before signing for Scunthorpe United in June 2018. He scored on his professional debut on 4 August 2018.

Dales was loaned to Scottish Premiership club Dundee in January 2019. He moved on loan to Hamilton Academical in January 2020.

In November 2020 he moved on loan to Altrincham. He was one of 17 players released by Scunthorpe at the end of the 2020–21 season.

He returned to Mickleover ahead of the 2021–22 season.

== International career ==
Dales was an England C international.

== Career statistics ==
As of match played 21 November 2020

Appearances and goals by club, season and competition
Club	Season	League			National Cup		League Cup		Other		Total	
Club	Season	Division	Apps	Goals	Apps	Goals	Apps	Goals	Apps	Goals	Apps	Goals
Scunthorpe United	2018–19	League One	20	1	2	0	0	0	3 (Note: Appearances in EFL Trophy)	1	25	2
Scunthorpe United	2019–20	League Two	3	0	0	0	0	0	3	0	6	0
Scunthorpe United	2020–21	League Two	0	0	0	0	0	0	2	0	2	0
Scunthorpe United	Total		23	1	2	0	0	0	8	1	33	1
Dundee (loan)	2018–19	Scottish Premiership	10	0	2	0	0	0	—		12	0
Hamilton Academical (loan)	2019–20	Scottish Premiership	2	0	2	1	0	0	—		4	1
Altrincham (loan)	2020–21	National League	3	0	—		—		0	0	3	0
Career total			38	1	6	1	0	0	8	1	52	3
