= 2019–20 Scunthorpe United F.C. season =

Scunthorpe United
2019–20 season
- Chairman: Peter Swann
- Manager: Paul Hurst (until 29 January); Russ Wilcox (from 12 February)
- Stadium: Glanford Park
- League Two: 21st
- FA Cup: First round (eliminated by Crawley Town)
- EFL Cup: First round (eliminated by Derby County)
- EFL Trophy: Quarter-finals (eliminated by Portsmouth)
- Top goalscorer: League: Kevin van Veen (10 goals); All: Kevin van Veen (15 goals)
| Home colours | Away colours |

The 2019–20 season was Scunthorpe United's 121st season in their existence and their first season back in League Two following relegation the previous season. Along with competing in League Two, the club also participated in the FA Cup, EFL Cup and EFL Trophy. The season covered the period from 1 July 2019 to 30 June 2020. Due to the COVID-19 pandemic in the United Kingdom the season was stopped.

== Pre-season ==
The Iron have confirmed pre-season friendlies against Dundee, Leicester City, West Bromwich Albion and Alfreton Town.

| 5 July 2019 Friendly | Dundee | 1–2 | Scunthorpe United | Cartagena, Spain |
| 12:00 CET | McGowan 12' | Report | Olomola 10'; Lund 32' | Stadium: La Manga Club Ground |

| 13 July 2019 Friendly | Guiseley | 0–2 | Scunthorpe United | Guiseley |
| 15:00 BST | | Report | Novak 39'; McAtee 44' | Stadium: Nethermoor Park |

| 16 July 2019 Friendly | Scunthorpe United | 0–1 | Leicester City | Scunthorpe |
| 19:30 BST | | Report | Pérez 35' | Stadium: Glanford Park; Attendance: 3,142 |

| 20 July 2019 Friendly | Scunthorpe United | 0–4 | West Bromwich Albion | Scunthorpe |
| 15:00 BST | | Report | Phillips 47', 51'; Krovinović 50'; Robson-Kanu 83' | Stadium: Glanford Park; Attendance: 1,956 |

| 23 July 2019 Friendly | Alfreton Town | 1–4 | Scunthorpe United | Alfreton |
| 19:30 BST | Morgan-Smith 11' | Report | Lund 38', 76', 85'; Gilliead 65' | Stadium: Impact Arena |

| 27 July 2019 Friendly | Scunthorpe United | 2–0 | Lincoln City | Scunthorpe |
| 13:00 BST | Hammill 24'; Trialist 42' | Report | | Stadium: Glanford Park; Attendance: 1,623 |

== Competitions ==
=== League Two ===
==== League table ====
| Pos | Team | Pld | W | D | L | GF | GA | GD | Pts | PPG | Promotion, qualification or relegation |
|---|---|---|---|---|---|---|---|---|---|---|---|
| 16 | Cambridge United | 37 | 12 | 9 | 16 | 40 | 48 | −8 | 45 | 1.22 | |
| 17 | Leyton Orient | 36 | 10 | 12 | 14 | 47 | 55 | −8 | 42 | 1.17 | |
| 18 | Carlisle United | 37 | 10 | 12 | 15 | 39 | 56 | −17 | 42 | 1.14 | |
| 19 | Oldham Athletic | 37 | 9 | 14 | 14 | 44 | 57 | −13 | 41 | 1.11 | |
| 20 | Scunthorpe United | 37 | 10 | 10 | 17 | 44 | 56 | −12 | 40 | 1.08 | |
| 21 | Mansfield Town | 36 | 9 | 11 | 16 | 48 | 55 | −7 | 38 | 1.06 | |
| 22 | Morecambe | 37 | 7 | 11 | 19 | 35 | 60 | −25 | 32 | 0.86 | |
| 23 | Stevenage | 36 | 3 | 13 | 20 | 24 | 50 | −26 | 22 | 0.61 | Reprieved from relegation (Note: As a result of Bury's expulsion from League One, only one team is relegated to maintain League Two at 24 teams.) |
| 24 | Macclesfield Town (R) | 37 | 7 | 15 | 15 | 32 | 47 | −15 | 19 (Note: Macclesfield Town were deducted a total of 17 points for various infractions. They were deducted six points for failing to both pay their players' wages and to fulfil a fixture, reduced to four points after appeal. A further seven-point deduction was given for failing to play December's match against Plymouth Argyle. A further two-point deduction was given for breaches of regulations over non-payment of wages. On 3 July the EFL appealed against the independent disciplinary panel's sanctions, and a further four points were deducted on 11 August 2020, resulting in Macclesfield Town being relegated.) | 0.51 | Relegation to the National League |

Source: EFL Official Website
Rules for classification: 1) Points per game; 2) Goal difference; 3) Number of goals scored; 4) Head-to-head results; 5) Wins; 6) Away goals; 7) Penalty points (sec 9.5); 8) 12-point sending off offences
(R) Relegated

==== Results summary ====
| Overall | | | | | | | | Home | | | | | | Away | | | | | |
| Pld | W | D | L | GF | GA | GD | Pts | W | D | L | GF | GA | GD | W | D | L | GF | GA | GD |
|---|---|---|---|---|---|---|---|---|---|---|---|---|---|---|---|---|---|---|---|
| 37 | 10 | 10 | 17 | 44 | 56 | −12 | 40 | 6 | 6 | 7 | 24 | 25 | −1 | 4 | 4 | 10 | 20 | 31 | −11 |

Last updated: 7 March 2020.
Source: BBC

==== Results by matchday ====
| Matchday | 1 | 2 | 3 | 4 | 5 | 6 | 7 | 8 | 9 | 10 | 11 | 12 | 13 | 14 | 15 | 16 | 17 | 18 | 19 | 20 | 21 | 22 | 23 | 24 | 25 | 26 | 27 | 28 | 29 | 30 | 31 | 32 | 33 | 34 | 35 | 36 | 37 |
|---|---|---|---|---|---|---|---|---|---|---|---|---|---|---|---|---|---|---|---|---|---|---|---|---|---|---|---|---|---|---|---|---|---|---|---|---|---|
| Ground | H | A | H | A | A | H | A | H | H | A | H | A | H | A | H | A | H | A | H | A | H | A | H | A | A | H | H | A | H | A | A | H | A | H | A | A | H |
| Result | L | L | D | L | L | L | L | W | D | L | D | D | W | L | W | D | D | W | W | W | D | W | L | L | W | L | L | D | D | L | L | W | L | W | D | L | L |
| Position | 22 | 24 | 23 | 24 | 24 | 24 | 24 | 23 | 23 | 23 | 23 | 22 | 22 | 22 | 22 | 22 | 21 | 19 | 16 | 14 | 13 | 12 | 12 | 14 | 12 | 14 | 15 | 14 | 15 | 16 | 19 | 16 | 18 | 17 | 18 | 18 | 19 |

Updated to match(es) played on 7 March 2020. Source: Statto.com
A = Away; H = Home; W = Win; D = Draw; L = Loss

==== Matches ====
On Thursday, 20 June 2019, the EFL League Two fixtures were revealed.

| 3 August 2019 1 | Scunthorpe United | 0–2 | Swindon Town | Scunthorpe |
| 15:00 BST | McGahey (yellow card) 30'; Butler (yellow card) 83' | Report | Yates 59'; Anderson 70' | Stadium: Glanford Park; Attendance: 4,135; Referee: Will Finnie |

| 10 August 2019 2 | Cheltenham Town | 4–1 | Scunthorpe United | Cheltenham |
| 15:00 BST | Debayo 45'; Broom 68'; Raglan 72'; Thomas 87' | Report | Songo'o (yellow card) 42'; Novak 55'; McGahey (yellow card) 90+1' | Stadium: Whaddon Road; Attendance: 2,742; Referee: Leigh Doughty |

| 17 August 2019 3 | Scunthorpe United | 2–2 | Crawley Town | Scunthorpe |
| 15:00 BST | Butler (yellow card) 15'; McArdle 33'; Lund 54' (yellow card) 72' | Report | Lubala 16' (penalty missed) 80'; Ferguson (yellow card) 39' (goal) 74' | Stadium: Glanford Park; Attendance: 3,186; Referee: Christopher Pollard |

| 20 August 2019 4 | Cambridge United | 3–2 | Scunthorpe United | Cambridge |
| 19:45 BST | Darling (yellow card) 39'; Knibbs 52'; Lewis 54', 73'; Taft (yellow card) 60'; Dunk (yellow card) 65' | Report | Perch (red card) 21'; Gilliead (yellow card) 26'; McArdle 41', 60'; Wootton (yellow card) 45' | Stadium: Abbey Stadium; Attendance: 3,917; Referee: Charles Breakspear |

| 24 August 2019 5 | Macclesfield Town | 1–0 | Scunthorpe United | Macclesfield |
| 15:00 BST | Ironside 54' (pen.); Keeffe (yellow card) 56'; Welch-Hayes (yellow card) 90' | Report | Wootton (yellow card) 59'; Ntlhe (yellow card) 78' | Stadium: Moss Rose; Attendance: 1,860; Referee: James Adcock |

| 31 August 2019 6 | Scunthorpe United | 0–1 | Carlisle United | Scunthorpe |
| 15:00 BST | Clarke (yellow card) 27' | Report | Carroll (yellow card) 35'; Loft 60' (yellow card) 89'; Knight-Percival (yellow card) 65'; McKirdy (yellow card) 74'; Iredale (yellow card) 84' | Stadium: Sands Venue Stadium; Attendance: 3,359; Referee: Sam Purkiss |

| 7 September 2019 7 | Mansfield Town | 2–0 | Scunthorpe United | Mansfield |
| 15:00 BST | Preston 31'; Rose 54'; Gordon (yellow card) 69' | Report | Eisa (yellow card) 19'; Clarke (yellow card) 57'; Butler (yellow card) 60' van Veen (yellow card) 85' | Stadium: One Call Stadium; Attendance: 4,772; Referee: John Busby |

| 14 September 2019 8 | Scunthorpe United | 3–0 | Morecambe | Scunthorpe |
| 15:00 BST | Brown (yellow card) 8'; Proctor (penalty missed) 25' 25' van Veen 33'; Lund 41' | Report | Buxton (penalty missed) 90+2' | Stadium: Sands Venue Stadium; Attendance: 3,017; Referee: Nick Kinseley |

| 17 September 2019 9 | Scunthorpe United | 2–2 | Oldham Athletic | Scunthorpe |
| 19:45 BST | Lund (yellow card) 10' (goal) 68'; Songo'o (yellow card) 40' van Veen 77' (yellow card) 78'; Proctor (yellow card) 90+4'; Brown (yellow card) 90+5' | Report | Branger (yellow card) 56' (goal) 64'; Missilou 62' (yellow card) 71'; Fage (yellow card) 79'; Morais (yellow card) 86'; Mills (yellow card) 90+8' | Stadium: Sands Venue Stadium; Attendance: 3,020; Referee: Martin Coy |

| 21 September 2019 10 | Walsall | 1–0 | Scunthorpe United | Bescot |
| 15:00 BST | Guthrie (yellow card) 36'; Holden (yellow card) 61'; Clarke 65' | Report | Colclough (yellow card) 64' | Stadium: Banks's Stadium; Attendance: 4,037; Referee: Marc Edwards |

| 28 September 2019 11 | Scunthorpe United | 1–1 | Bradford City | Scunthorpe |
| 15:00 BST | Ward 13' (pen.) (yellow card) 68'; Lund (red card) 19'; Songo'o (yellow card) 90+4' | Report | O'Connor 56' (yellow card) 72'; Akpan (yellow card) 90+2'; Vaughan (yellow card) 90+3' | Stadium: Sands Venue Stadium; Attendance: 4,554; Referee: Rob Lewis |

| 5 October 2019 12 | Plymouth Argyle | 2–2 | Scunthorpe United | Plymouth |
| 15:00 BST | Aimson 18', 76' | Report | Gilliead 7'; Eisa 90+3' | Stadium: Home Park; Attendance: 8,800; Referee: Andy Woolmer |

| 12 October 2019 13 | Scunthorpe United | 3–0 | Northampton Town | Scunthorpe |
| 15:00 BST | Novak 11', 14' van Veen 31'; Colclough (yellow card) 34'; Proctor (yellow card) 75' | Report | Oliver (red card) 53' | Stadium: Sands Venue Stadium; Attendance: 3,377; Referee: Trevor Kettle |

| 19 October 2019 14 | Newport County | 2–1 | Scunthorpe United | Newport |
| 15:00 BST | McNamara (yellow card) 2'; O'Brien (yellow card) 45+1'; Amond 45+4'; Sheehan 56'; Willmott (yellow card) 87' | Report | Proctor (yellow card) 22'; Sutton (yellow card) 34'; O'Brien 49' (o.g.); Ward (yellow card) 75' | Stadium: Rodney Parade; Attendance: 3,936; Referee: Tom Nield |

| 22 October 2019 15 | Scunthorpe United | 3–1 | Exeter City | Scunthorpe |
| 19:45 BST | McGahey (yellow card) 2'; Songo'o (yellow card) 8'; Perch 24'; Ward 37'; Gilliead 75' | Report | Parkes (yellow card) 21'; Jay 27' | Stadium: Sands Venue Stadium; Attendance: 3,055; Referee: Sebastian Stockbridge |

| 26 October 2019 16 | Salford City | 1–1 | Scunthorpe United | Salford |
| 15:00 BST | Armstrong (yellow card) 15'; Burgess 45+2' | Report | van Veen 34' | Stadium: The Peninsula Stadium; Attendance: 3,448; Referee: Sam Purkiss |

| 2 November 2019 17 | Scunthorpe United | 0–0 | Stevenage | Scunthorpe |
| 15:00 GMT | | Report | Timlin (yellow card) 58' | Stadium: Sands Venue Stadium; Attendance: 3,309; Referee: Anthony Backhouse |

| 16 November 2019 18 | Leyton Orient | 0–2 | Scunthorpe United | Leyton |
| 15:00 GMT | Ling (yellow card) 81' | Report | Gilliead 4' (yellow card) 29'; Perch (yellow card) 45+2'; Novak 79' | Stadium: The Breyer Group Stadium; Attendance: 6,670; Referee: Brett Huxtable |

| 23 November 2019 19 | Scunthorpe United | 2–1 | Port Vale | Scunthorpe |
| 15:00 GMT | van Veen 37'; Ntlhe 51'; Gilliead (yellow card) 57'; Lund (red card) 90+4' | Report | Taylor 30'; Gibbons (yellow card) 31'; Joyce (yellow card) 44'; Montaño (yellow card) 45+2'; Worrall (red card) 90+5' | Stadium: Sands Venue Stadium; Attendance: 3,391; Referee: James Oldham |

| 7 December 2019 20 | Forest Green Rovers | 0–2 | Scunthorpe United | Nailsworth |
| 15:00 GMT | Bernard (yellow card) 45'; Stevens (penalty missed) 49' | Report | Perch (yellow card) 5' van Veen (yellow card) 9'; Novak (yellow card) 41'; McGahey (yellow card) 48'; Sutton (yellow card) 52' (yellow-red card) 90+4'; Gilliead 57'; Eisa 71'; Ntlhe (yellow card) 75' | Stadium: The New Lawn; Attendance: 2,060; Referee: John Busby |

| 14 December 2019 21 | Scunthorpe United | 2–2 | Colchester United | Scunthorpe |
| 15:00 GMT | Eisa 42' van Veen 47'; Clarke (yellow card) 64' | Report | Pell (yellow card) 26'; Norris 58' (yellow card) 73'; Prosser 62'; Nouble (yellow card) 77' | Stadium: Sands Venue Stadium; Attendance: 3,081; Referee: Ross Joyce |

| 21 December 2019 22 | Grimsby Town | 0–1 | Scunthorpe United | Cleethorpes |
| 13:00 GMT | Clifton (yellow card) 36'; Wright (yellow card) 82' | Report | Brown (yellow card) 26'; McGahey (yellow card) 32' van Veen 62' (yellow card) 62'; Ntlhe (yellow card) 73'; Ward (yellow card) 76' | Stadium: Blundell Park; Attendance: 7,385; Referee: Tom Nield |

| 26 December 2019 23 | Scunthorpe United | 0–2 | Walsall | Scunthorpe |
| 15:00 GMT | | Report | McDonald 43'; Kinsella (yellow card) 78'; Bates 84' | Stadium: Glanford Park; Attendance: 3,842; Referee: Carl Boyeson |

| 29 December 2019 24 | Crewe Alexandra | 3–1 | Scunthorpe United | Crewe |
| 15:00 GMT | Powell 20', 83'; Green 40'; Hunt (yellow card) 51' | Report | Perch (yellow card) 45'; McArdle (yellow card) 53'; Lund (yellow card) 66'; Novak 81' | Stadium: Alexandra Stadium; Attendance: 4,578; Referee: Marc Edwards |

| 1 January 2020 25 | Oldham Athletic | 0–2 | Scunthorpe United | Oldham |
| 15:00 GMT | | Report | Eisa 35'; Lund 83' | Stadium: Boundary Park; Attendance: 2,972; Referee: Graham Salisbury |

| 4 January 2020 26 | Scunthorpe United | 1–3 | Plymouth Argyle | Scunthorpe |
| 15:00 GMT | Ntlhe (yellow card) 60' van Veen 65' | Report | Jephcott 12', 56'; Sarcevic (yellow card) 21'; Cooper (yellow card) 45+2'; Moore 50' | Stadium: Sands Venue Stadium; Attendance: 3,450; Referee: Paul Marsden |

| 11 January 2020 27 | Scunthorpe United | 1–2 | Newport County | Scunthorpe |
| 15:00 GMT | Eisa 38'; Ntlhe (yellow card) 49'; Novak (red card) 75' | Report | Inniss (yellow card) 40'; Labadie (yellow card) 45+1'; Matt 72'; Amond 76' (yellow card) 90+2' | Stadium: Glanford Park; Attendance: 3,001; Referee: Scott Oldham |

| 18 January 2020 28 | Bradford City | 2–2 | Scunthorpe United | Bradford |
| 15:00 GMT | Akpan 17'; Vaughan 19' (yellow card) 27'; O'Connor (yellow card) 90+6' | Report | Ntlhe (yellow card) 24'; Gilliead 33'; McAtee 74'; Lund (yellow card) 81'; Perch (yellow card) 90+2' | Stadium: Northern Commercials Stadium; Attendance: 14,176; Referee: Anthony Backhouse |

| 25 January 2020 29 | Scunthorpe United | 2–2 | Crewe Alexandra | Scunthorpe |
| 15:00 GMT | Bedeau 15'; Lund (yellow card) 61' van Veen 73' | Report | Powell 46'; Finney 69' | Stadium: Sands Venue Stadium; Attendance: 3,139; Referee: Christopher Sarginson |

| 28 January 2020 30 | Northampton Town | 3–0 | Scunthorpe United | Northampton |
| 19:45 GMT | Watson (yellow card) 2'; Oliver 7', 62'; Hoskins 70' (pen.) | Report | van Veen (red card) 36'; McGahey (yellow card) 70'; Lawrence-Gabriel (yellow card) 85' | Stadium: PTS Academy Stadium; Attendance: 4,038; Referee: Sam Purkiss |

| 1 February 2020 31 | Crawley Town | 3–1 | Scunthorpe United | Crawley |
| 15:00 GMT | Tunnicliffe 6'; Grego-Cox 24'; Palmer (yellow card) 37' (goal) 45'; Doherty (yellow card) 47'; Sendles-White (yellow card) 87' | Report | Sutton (yellow card) 34' van Veen 57' (pen.) | Stadium: Broadfield Stadium; Attendance: 2,130; Referee: Tom Nield |

| 8 February 2020 32 | Scunthorpe United | 1–0 | Cheltenham Town | Scunthorpe |
| 15:00 GMT | McAtee 17' (yellow card) 53'; Perch (yellow card) 61' | Report | Long (yellow card) 82' | Stadium: Sands Venue Stadium; Attendance: 3,159; Referee: Christopher Pollard |

| 11 February 2020 33 | Scunthorpe United | 0–2 | Cambridge United | Scunthorpe |
| 19:45 GMT | | Report | El Mizouni 16'; Mullin 61' | Stadium: Sands Venue Stadium; Attendance: 2,746; Referee: Thomas Bramall |

| 15 February 2020 | Swindon Town | v | Scunthorpe United | Swindon |
| 15:00 GMT | | Report | | Stadium: County Ground |
Note: Match was postponed due to supporters safety.

| 22 February 2020 34 | Scunthorpe United | 1–0 | Forest Green Rovers | Scunthorpe |
| 15:00 GMT | McAtee (yellow card) 17' (goal) 46'; Eisa (yellow card) 61'; Gilliead (yellow card) 72'; Butler (yellow card) 83' | Report | Williams (yellow card) 48' | Stadium: Sands Venue Stadium; Attendance: 3,706; Referee: Carl Boyeson |

| 29 February 2020 35 | Port Vale | 2–2 | Scunthorpe United | Burslem |
| 15:00 GMT | Cullen 16'; Smith 78' | Report | Gilliead 71'; Miller 90' | Stadium: Vale Park; Attendance: 5,121; Referee: Antony Coggins |

| 3 March 2020 36 | Swindon Town | 2–0 | Scunthorpe United | Swindon |
| 19:45 GMT | Doyle 41', 77' | Report | Rowe (yellow card) 4'; Perch (yellow card) 72' | Stadium: County Ground; Attendance: 7,583; Referee: Peter Wright |

| 7 March 2020 37 | Scunthorpe United | 0–2 | Grimsby Town | Scunthorpe |
| 13:00 GMT | Bedeau (yellow card) 65'; Sutton (red card) 81'; Gilliead (yellow card) 86'; Perch (yellow card) 90+2' | Report | Glennon (yellow card) 20'; Waterfall (yellow card) 22' (goal) 61'; Vernam 52'; Hewitt (yellow card) 89' | Stadium: Sands Venue Stadium; Attendance: 6,855; Referee: Anthony Backhouse |

| 14 March 2020 | Colchester United | v | Scunthorpe United | Colchester |
| 15:00 GMT | | | | Stadium: JobServe Community Stadium |
Note: Season was suspended until 3 April 2020, due to the COVID-19 pandemic.

| 17 March 2020 | Exeter City | v | Scunthorpe United | Exeter |
| 19:45 GMT | | | | Stadium: St James Park |
Note: Season was suspended until 3 April 2020, due to the COVID-19 pandemic.

| 21 March 2020 | Scunthorpe United | v | Salford City | Scunthorpe |
| 15:00 GMT | | | | Stadium: Sands Venue Stadium |
Note: Season was suspended until 3 April 2020, due to the COVID-19 pandemic.

| 28 March 2020 | Stevenage | v | Scunthorpe United | Stevenage |
| 15:00 GMT | | | | Stadium: The Lamex Stadium |
Note: Season was suspended until 3 April 2020, due to the COVID-19 pandemic.

| 4 April 2020 | Scunthorpe United | v | Leyton Orient | Scunthorpe |
| 15:00 BST | | | | Stadium: Glanford Park |
Note: On 3 April, the English Football League decided to postpone all football until safe to do so due to the COVID-19 pandemic.

| 10 April 2020 | Scunthorpe United | v | Macclesfield Town | Scunthorpe |
| 15:00 BST | | | | Stadium: Sands Venue Stadium |
Note: On 3 April, the English Football League decided to postpone all football until safe to do so due to the COVID-19 pandemic.

| 13 April 2020 | Carlisle United | v | Scunthorpe United | Carlisle |
| 13:00 BST | | | | Stadium: Brunton Park |
Note: On 3 April, the English Football League decided to postpone all football until safe to do so due to the COVID-19 pandemic.

| 18 April 2020 | Scunthorpe United | v | Mansfield Town | Scunthorpe |
| 15:00 BST | | | | Stadium: Sands Venue Stadium |
Note: On 3 April, the English Football League decided to postpone all football until safe to do so due to the COVID-19 pandemic.

| 25 April 2020 | Morecambe | v | Scunthorpe United | Morecambe |
| 15:00 BST | | | | Stadium: Globe Arena |
Note: On 3 April, the English Football League decided to postpone all football until safe to do so due to the COVID-19 pandemic.

=== FA Cup ===
The first round draw was made on 21 October 2019.

| 9 November 2019 First round | Crawley Town | 4–1 | Scunthorpe United | Crawley |
| 15:00 GMT | Nadesan 35'; Grego-Cox 82', 90+6'; Nathaniel-George 90+4' | Report | Lund (yellow card) 30'; Colclough 79'; McArdle (yellow card) 87' | Stadium: The People's Pension Stadium; Attendance: 1,706; Referee: Lee Swabey |

=== EFL Cup ===
The first round draw was made on 20 June.

| 13 August 2019 First round | Scunthorpe United | 0–1 | Derby County | Scunthorpe |
| 19:45 BST | McArdle (yellow card) 62'; Dawson (yellow card) 76' | Report | Bielik (yellow card) 22'; Buchanan 78'; Sibley (yellow card) 90+4' | Stadium: Glanford Park; Attendance: 3,679; Referee: Robert Jones |

=== EFL Trophy ===
On 9 July 2019, the pre-determined group stage draw was announced with Invited clubs to be drawn on 12 July 2019. The draw for the second round was made on 16 November 2019 live on Sky Sports. The third round draw was confirmed on 5 December 2019.

| Pos | Div | Team | Pld | W | PW | PL | L | GF | GA | GD | Pts | Qualification |
|---|---|---|---|---|---|---|---|---|---|---|---|---|
| 1 | ACA | Leicester City U21 | 3 | 2 | 1 | 0 | 0 | 5 | 3 | +2 | 8 | Advance to Round 2 |
| 2 | L2 | Scunthorpe United | 3 | 2 | 0 | 1 | 0 | 6 | 2 | +4 | 7 | Advance to Round 2 |
| 3 | L1 | Sunderland | 3 | 1 | 0 | 0 | 2 | 4 | 7 | −3 | 3 | |
| 4 | L2 | Grimsby Town | 3 | 0 | 0 | 0 | 3 | 4 | 7 | −3 | 0 | |

Source: EFL.com

| 3 September 2019 Group stage | Grimsby Town | 1–2 | Scunthorpe United | Cleethorpes |
| 19:45 BST | Pollock (yellow card) 32'; Cardwell 49' | Report | van Veen 28', 75'; Colclough (yellow card) 69'; Perch (red card) 90+2' | Stadium: Blundell Park; Attendance: 1,302; Referee: Andy Haines |

| 24 September 2019 Group stage | Scunthorpe United | 1–1 (1–3 p) | Leicester City U21 | Scunthorpe |
| 19:45 BST | Colclough 88' | Report | Benković (yellow card) 54'; Dewsbury-Hall 87' | Stadium: Sands Venue Stadium; Attendance: 572; Referee: Paul Marsden |
| | Penalties |
| | Colclough (penalty missed); Miller (penalty missed); Dales (penalty scored); Sutton (penalty missed) | | Dewsbury-Hall (penalty scored); Muskwe (penalty missed); Eppiah (penalty scored); Thomas (penalty scored) |

| 12 November 2019 Group stage | Scunthorpe United | 3–0 | Sunderland | Scunthorpe |
| 19:45 GMT | Novak 66' (pen.), 90+1'; Eisa 88' | Report | Willis (yellow card) 57'; O'Nien (red card) 65'; Power (yellow card) 72' | Stadium: Sands Venue Stadium; Attendance: 1,002; Referee: Darren Handley |

| 27 December 2019 Second round | Blackpool | 1–3 | Scunthorpe United | Blackpool |
| 19:45 GMT | Scannell (yellow card) 47'; Nuttall 70'; Guy (yellow card) 19' (yellow-red card) 73'; Thompson (yellow card) 88' | Report | van Veen 12' (yellow card) 30'; Eisa 25', 90' | Stadium: Bloomfield Road; Referee: Ben Toner |

| 8 January 2020 Third round | Scunthorpe United | 3–1 | Manchester City U21 | Scunthorpe |
| 19:45 GMT | van Veen 9', 28'; Lund 32' (yellow card) 78' | Report | Doyle 71' (pen.) | Stadium: Sands Venue Stadium; Attendance: 1,270 |

| 21 January 2020 Quarter-final | Portsmouth | 2–1 | Scunthorpe United | Milton |
| 19:45 GMT | Marquis 13'; McGeehan 66' | Report | Eisa 62' | Stadium: Fratton Park; Attendance: 5,382 |

== Squad ==
| No. | Name | Pos. | Nat. | Place of Birth | Age | Apps | Goals | Signed from | Date Signed | Fee | Contract |
Goalkeepers
| 1 | Rory Watson | GK | (England) | York | 30 | 42 | 0 | Hull City | 31 January 2017 | Free | 2020 |
| 13 | Ian Lawlor | GK | (Republic of Ireland) | Dublin | 31 | 4 | 0 | Doncaster Rovers | 27 January 2020 | Loan | 2020 |
| 31 | Adam Kelsey | GK | (England) | Kingston upon Hull | 34 | 0 | 0 | Academy | 26 January 2017 | Trainee | 2020 |
Defenders
| 2 | Jordan Clarke | RB | (England) | Coventry | 34 | 155 | 4 | Coventry City | 10 January 2015 | Undisclosed | 2020 |
| 3 | Kgosi Ntlhe | LB | (South Africa) | Pretoria | 32 | 21 | 1 | Rochdale | 4 July 2019 | Free | 2020 |
| 6 | Andy Butler | CB | (England) | Doncaster | 42 | 174 | 15 | Doncaster Rovers | 1 July 2019 | Free | 2020 |
| 8 | James Horsfield | RB | (England) | Stockport | 30 | 15 | 0 | NAC Breda | 17 July 2018 | Free | 2020 |
| 14 | James Perch | RB/DM | (England) | Mansfield | 40 | 81 | 4 | Queens Park Rangers | 1 August 2018 | Free | 2020 |
| 15 | Jordan Lawrence-Gabriel | RB | (Scotland) (England) | London | 27 | 9 | 0 | Nottingham Forest | 24 January 2020 | Loan | 2020 |
| 16 | Lewis Butroid | LB | (England) | Gainsborough | 27 | 27 | 0 | Academy | 26 January 2017 | Trainee | 2020 |
| 23 | Rory McArdle | CB | (England) | Sheffield | 39 | 117 | 4 | Bradford City | 1 July 2017 | Free | 2020 |
| 26 | Harrison McGahey | CB | (England) | Preston | 30 | 46 | 0 | Rochdale | 4 January 2019 | Undisclosed | 2021 |
| 28 | Junior Brown | LB | (England) | Crewe | 37 | 23 | 0 | Coventry City | 29 August 2019 | Loan | 2020 |
| 32 | Jacob Bedeau | CB | (England) | Waltham Forest | 26 | 15 | 1 | Aston Villa | 31 January 2019 | Undisclosed | 2021 |
Midfielders
| 5 | Yann Songo'o | DM/CB | (Cameroon) | Toulon | 34 | 19 | 0 | Plymouth Argyle | 14 July 2019 | Free | 2020 |
| 18 | Jordan Hallam | LW | (England) | Sheffield | 27 | 8 | 1 | Sheffield United | 25 January 2019 | Free | 2020 |
| 19 | Yasin Ben El-Mhanni | RM | (England) | London | 30 | 8 | 1 | Free Agent | 26 October 2018 | Free | 2020 |
| 20 | Alex Gilliead | RW | (England) | Shotley Bridge | 30 | 42 | 6 | Shrewsbury Town | 9 July 2019 | Undisclosed | 2021 |
| 22 | Levi Sutton | CM/RB | (England) | Scunthorpe | 30 | 68 | 1 | Academy | 2 June 2015 | Trainee | 2020 |
| 27 | Regan Slater | DM | (England) | Gleadless | 26 | 16 | 0 | Sheffield United | 27 July 2019 | Loan | 2020 |
| 30 | Abo Eisa | LW | (Sudan) | Khartoum | 30 | 35 | 9 | Shrewsbury Town | 15 August 2019 | Free | 2021 |
| 34 | Alfie Beestin | AM | (England) | Leeds | 28 | 4 | 0 | Tadcaster Albion | 15 January 2020 | Undisclosed | 2021 |
| 40 | Tom Pugh | CM | (Wales) (England) | Doncaster | 25 | 2 | 0 | Academy | 1 July 2019 | Trainee | Undisclosed |
| 43 | Ben Liddle | CM | (England) | Durham | 27 | 4 | 0 | Middlesbrough | 31 January 2020 | Loan | 2020 |
| 48 | Joey Dawson | AM | (England) | Scunthorpe | 22 | 1 | 0 | Academy | 1 July 2019 | Trainee | Undisclosed |
Forwards
| 7 | Ryan Colclough | LW | (England) | Stoke-on-Trent | 31 | 46 | 5 | Wigan Athletic | 9 August 2018 | Undisclosed | 2021 |
| 10 | Kevin van Veen | CF | (Netherlands) | Eindhoven | 34 | 162 | 39 | Northampton Town | 2 January 2019 | Undisclosed | 2021 |
| 12 | Andy Dales | CF | (England) | Derby | 31 | 28 | 2 | Mickleover Sports | 1 July 2018 | Undisclosed | 2020 |
| 29 | George Miller | CF | (England) | Bolton | 27 | 19 | 1 | Barnsley | 22 August 2019 | Loan | 2020 |
| 33 | Devarn Green | CF | (England) | | 29 | 2 | 0 | Southport | 31 January 2020 | Undisclosed | 2021 |
| 45 | John McAtee | CF | (England) | Manchester | 26 | 26 | 3 | Shrewsbury Town | 8 July 2019 | Free | Undisclosed |
On Loan
| 11 | Adam Hammill | RM | (England) | Liverpool | 38 | 19 | 1 | St. Mirren | 3 January 2019 | Undisclosed | 2020 |
| 21 | Cameron Burgess | CB | (Australia) | Aberdeen | 30 | 73 | 3 | Fulham | 1 July 2017 | Undisclosed | 2020 |
| 24 | Olufela Olomola | CF | (England) | London | 28 | 6 | 0 | Southampton | 1 July 2018 | Free | 2021 |

=== Statistics ===
As of 23 March 2020

| No. | Pos | Nat | Player | Total | | League Two | | FA Cup | | League Cup | | League Trophy | |
| No. | Pos | Nat | Player | Apps | Goals | Apps | Goals | Apps | Goals | Apps | Goals | Apps | Goals |
|---|---|---|---|---|---|---|---|---|---|---|---|---|---|
| 1 | GK | (England) ENG | Rory Watson | 26 | 0 | 23+0 | 0 | 0+0 | 0 | 1+0 | 0 | 2+0 | 0 |
| 2 | DF | (England) ENG | Jordan Clarke | 17 | 0 | 11+1 | 0 | 0+0 | 0 | 0+0 | 0 | 5+0 | 0 |
| 3 | DF | (South Africa) RSA | Kgosi Ntlhe | 21 | 1 | 14+4 | 1 | 0+0 | 0 | 1+0 | 0 | 2+0 | 0 |
| 5 | MF | (Cameroon) CMR | Yann Songo'o | 19 | 0 | 16+0 | 0 | 1+0 | 0 | 0+1 | 0 | 1+0 | 0 |
| 6 | DF | (England) ENG | Andy Butler | 21 | 0 | 16+2 | 0 | 1+0 | 0 | 1+0 | 0 | 1+0 | 0 |
| 7 | FW | (England) ENG | Ryan Colclough | 26 | 2 | 8+12 | 0 | 1+0 | 1 | 1+0 | 0 | 2+2 | 1 |
| 10 | FW | (Netherlands) NED | Kevin van Veen | 32 | 15 | 23+4 | 10 | 1+0 | 0 | 0+0 | 0 | 3+1 | 5 |
| 13 | GK | (Republic of Ireland) IRL | Ian Lawlor | 4 | 0 | 4+0 | 0 | 0+0 | 0 | 0+0 | 0 | 0+0 | 0 |
| 14 | DF | (England) ENG | James Perch | 36 | 1 | 30+0 | 1 | 1+0 | 0 | 1+0 | 0 | 4+0 | 0 |
| 15 | DF | (Scotland) SCO | Jordan Lawrence-Gabriel | 9 | 0 | 8+1 | 0 | 0+0 | 0 | 0+0 | 0 | 0+0 | 0 |
| 16 | DF | (England) ENG | Lewis Butroid | 5 | 0 | 4+0 | 0 | 0+0 | 0 | 0+0 | 0 | 0+1 | 0 |
| 18 | MF | (England) ENG | Jordan Hallam | 1 | 0 | 0+0 | 0 | 0+0 | 0 | 0+0 | 0 | 0+1 | 0 |
| 19 | MF | (England) ENG | Yasin Ben El-Mhanni | 1 | 0 | 0+1 | 0 | 0+0 | 0 | 0+0 | 0 | 0+0 | 0 |
| 20 | MF | (England) ENG | Alex Gilliead | 42 | 6 | 33+2 | 6 | 1+0 | 0 | 1+0 | 0 | 5+0 | 0 |
| 22 | MF | (England) ENG | Levi Sutton | 19 | 0 | 13+3 | 0 | 0+0 | 0 | 0+0 | 0 | 3+0 | 0 |
| 23 | DF | (Northern Ireland) NIR | Rory McArdle | 31 | 3 | 26+0 | 3 | 1+0 | 0 | 1+0 | 0 | 3+0 | 0 |
| 26 | DF | (England) ENG | Harrison McGahey | 36 | 0 | 31+1 | 0 | 0+0 | 0 | 0+0 | 0 | 4+0 | 0 |
| 27 | MF | (England) ENG | Regan Slater | 16 | 0 | 8+5 | 0 | 0+0 | 0 | 1+0 | 0 | 1+1 | 0 |
| 28 | DF | (England) ENG | Junior Brown | 23 | 0 | 19+0 | 0 | 1+0 | 0 | 0+0 | 0 | 3+0 | 0 |
| 29 | FW | (England) ENG | George Miller | 19 | 1 | 7+8 | 1 | 0+0 | 0 | 0+0 | 0 | 2+2 | 0 |
| 30 | MF | (Sudan) SDN | Abo Eisa | 35 | 9 | 23+5 | 5 | 0+1 | 0 | 0+0 | 0 | 5+1 | 4 |
| 32 | DF | (England) ENG | Jacob Bedeau | 15 | 1 | 11+0 | 1 | 0+0 | 0 | 0+0 | 0 | 4+0 | 0 |
| 33 | FW | (England) ENG | Devarn Green | 2 | 0 | 0+2 | 0 | 0+0 | 0 | 0+0 | 0 | 0+0 | 0 |
| 34 | MF | (England) ENG | Alfie Beestin | 4 | 0 | 0+3 | 0 | 0+0 | 0 | 0+0 | 0 | 0+1 | 0 |
| 35 | DF | (England) ENG | Jai Rowe | 1 | 0 | 1+0 | 0 | 0+0 | 0 | 0+0 | 0 | 0+0 | 0 |
| 40 | MF | (Wales) WAL | Tom Pugh | 2 | 0 | 0+1 | 0 | 0+0 | 0 | 0+0 | 0 | 0+1 | 0 |
| 43 | MF | (England) ENG | Ben Liddle | 4 | 0 | 2+2 | 0 | 0+0 | 0 | 0+0 | 0 | 0+0 | 0 |
| 44 | MF | (England) ENG | George Hornshaw | 1 | 0 | 0+0 | 0 | 0+0 | 0 | 0+0 | 0 | 0+1 | 0 |
| 45 | FW | (England) ENG | John McAtee | 26 | 3 | 11+8 | 3 | 0+0 | 0 | 1+0 | 0 | 5+1 | 0 |
| 48 | MF | (England) ENG | Joey Dawson | 1 | 0 | 0+0 | 0 | 0+0 | 0 | 0+1 | 0 | 0+0 | 0 |
Players out on loan:
| 11 | MF | (England) ENG | Adam Hammill | 4 | 0 | 3+0 | 0 | 0+0 | 0 | 0+1 | 0 | 0+0 | 0 |
| 12 | MF | (England) ENG | Andy Dales | 6 | 0 | 0+3 | 0 | 0+0 | 0 | 0+0 | 0 | 0+3 | 0 |
Players who left the club:
| 4 | MF | (Northern Ireland) NIR | Matty Lund | 28 | 5 | 22+0 | 4 | 1+0 | 0 | 1+0 | 0 | 4+0 | 1 |
| 9 | FW | (England) ENG | Kyle Wootton | 5 | 0 | 4+1 | 0 | 0+0 | 0 | 0+0 | 0 | 0+0 | 0 |
| 13 | FW | (Northern Ireland) NIR | Jamie Ward | 6 | 2 | 3+3 | 2 | 0+0 | 0 | 0+0 | 0 | 0+0 | 0 |
| 17 | FW | (England) ENG | Lee Novak | 24 | 7 | 18+1 | 5 | 0+1 | 0 | 1+0 | 0 | 3+0 | 2 |
| 25 | GK | (England) ENG | Jake Eastwood | 15 | 0 | 10+1 | 0 | 1+0 | 0 | 0+0 | 0 | 3+0 | 0 |
| 33 | FW | (England) ENG | Jamie Proctor | 14 | 1 | 4+9 | 1 | 1+0 | 0 | 0+0 | 0 | 0+0 | 0 |

==== Goals record ====
As of 23 March 2020

| Rank | No. | Nat. | Po. | Name | League Two | FA Cup | League Cup | League Trophy | Total |
|---|---|---|---|---|---|---|---|---|---|
| 1 | 10 | (Netherlands) | CF | Kevin van Veen | 10 | 0 | 0 | 5 | 15 |
| 2 | 30 | (Sudan) | LM | Abo Eisa | 5 | 0 | 0 | 4 | 9 |
| 3 | ~~17~~ | (England) | CF | Lee Novak | 5 | 0 | 0 | 2 | 7 |
| 4 | 20 | (England) | RW | Alex Gilliead | 6 | 0 | 0 | 0 | 6 |
| 5 | ~~4~~ | (Northern Ireland) | CM | Matty Lund | 4 | 0 | 0 | 1 | 5 |
| 6 | 23 | (Northern Ireland) | CB | Rory McArdle | 3 | 0 | 0 | 0 | 3 |
| 6 | 45 | (England) | CF | John McAtee | 3 | 0 | 0 | 0 | 3 |
| 8 | 7 | (England) | RW | Ryan Colclough | 0 | 1 | 0 | 1 | 2 |
| 8 | ~~13~~ | (Northern Ireland) | LW | Jamie Ward | 2 | 0 | 0 | 0 | 2 |
| 10 | 3 | (South Africa) | LB | Kgosi Ntlhe | 1 | 0 | 0 | 0 | 1 |
| 10 | 14 | (England) | RB | James Perch | 1 | 0 | 0 | 0 | 1 |
| 10 | 29 | (England) | CF | George Miller | 1 | 0 | 0 | 0 | 1 |
| 10 | 32 | (England) | CB | Jacob Bedeau | 1 | 0 | 0 | 0 | 1 |
| 10 | ~~33~~ | (England) | CF | Jamie Proctor | 1 | 0 | 0 | 0 | 1 |
| Own Goals | | | | | 1 | 0 | 0 | 0 | 1 |
| Total | | | | | 44 | 1 | 0 | 13 | 57 |

==== Disciplinary record ====
As of 23 March 2020

| Rank | No. | Nat. | Po. | Name | League One | | | FA Cup | | | League Cup | | | League Trophy | | | Total | | |
| Rank | No. | Nat. | Po. | Name | Booked | (yellow card) (yellow-red card) | Sent off (straight red) | Booked | (yellow card) (yellow-red card) | Sent off (straight red) | Booked | (yellow card) (yellow-red card) | Sent off (straight red) | Booked | (yellow card) (yellow-red card) | Sent off (straight red) | Booked | (yellow card) (yellow-red card) | Sent off (straight red) |
|---|---|---|---|---|---|---|---|---|---|---|---|---|---|---|---|---|---|---|---|
| 1 | ~~4~~ | (Northern Ireland) | CM | Matty Lund | 5 | 0 | 2 | 1 | 0 | 0 | 0 | 0 | 0 | 1 | 0 | 0 | 7 | 0 | 2 |
| 1 | 14 | (England) | RB | James Perch | 7 | 0 | 1 | 0 | 0 | 0 | 0 | 0 | 0 | 0 | 0 | 1 | 7 | 0 | 2 |
| 3 | 3 | (South Africa) | LB | Kgosi Ntlhe | 6 | 0 | 0 | 0 | 0 | 0 | 0 | 0 | 0 | 0 | 0 | 0 | 6 | 0 | 0 |
| 3 | 10 | (Netherlands) | CF | Kevin van Veen | 4 | 0 | 1 | 0 | 0 | 0 | 0 | 0 | 0 | 1 | 0 | 0 | 5 | 0 | 1 |
| 5 | 6 | (England) | CB | Andy Butler | 4 | 0 | 0 | 0 | 0 | 0 | 1 | 0 | 0 | 0 | 0 | 0 | 5 | 0 | 0 |
| 5 | 20 | (England) | RW | Alex Gilliead | 5 | 0 | 0 | 0 | 0 | 0 | 0 | 0 | 0 | 0 | 0 | 0 | 5 | 0 | 0 |
| 5 | 22 | (England) | CM | Levi Sutton | 2 | 1 | 1 | 0 | 0 | 0 | 0 | 0 | 0 | 0 | 0 | 0 | 2 | 1 | 1 |
| 5 | 26 | (England) | CB | Harrison McGahey | 5 | 0 | 0 | 0 | 0 | 0 | 0 | 0 | 0 | 0 | 0 | 0 | 5 | 0 | 0 |
| 9 | 2 | (England) | RB | Jordan Clarke | 4 | 0 | 0 | 0 | 0 | 0 | 0 | 0 | 0 | 0 | 0 | 0 | 4 | 0 | 0 |
| 9 | 5 | (Cameroon) | DM | Yann Songo'o | 4 | 0 | 0 | 0 | 0 | 0 | 0 | 0 | 0 | 0 | 0 | 0 | 4 | 0 | 0 |
| 11 | 7 | (England) | RW | Ryan Colclough | 2 | 0 | 0 | 0 | 0 | 0 | 0 | 0 | 0 | 1 | 0 | 0 | 3 | 0 | 0 |
| 11 | ~~13~~ | (Northern Ireland) | LW | Jamie Ward | 3 | 0 | 0 | 0 | 0 | 0 | 0 | 0 | 0 | 0 | 0 | 0 | 3 | 0 | 0 |
| 11 | 28 | (England) | LB | Junior Brown | 3 | 0 | 0 | 0 | 0 | 0 | 0 | 0 | 0 | 0 | 0 | 0 | 3 | 0 | 0 |
| 11 | ~~33~~ | (England) | CF | Jamie Proctor | 3 | 0 | 0 | 0 | 0 | 0 | 0 | 0 | 0 | 0 | 0 | 0 | 3 | 0 | 0 |
| 15 | ~~9~~ | (England) | CF | Kyle Wootton | 2 | 0 | 0 | 0 | 0 | 0 | 0 | 0 | 0 | 0 | 0 | 0 | 2 | 0 | 0 |
| 15 | ~~17~~ | (England) | CF | Lee Novak | 1 | 0 | 1 | 0 | 0 | 0 | 0 | 0 | 0 | 0 | 0 | 0 | 1 | 0 | 1 |
| 15 | 23 | (England) | CB | Rory McArdle | 1 | 0 | 0 | 1 | 0 | 0 | 0 | 0 | 0 | 0 | 0 | 0 | 2 | 0 | 0 |
| 15 | 30 | (Sudan) | LM | Abo Eisa | 2 | 0 | 0 | 0 | 0 | 0 | 0 | 0 | 0 | 0 | 0 | 0 | 2 | 0 | 0 |
| 15 | 32 | (England) | CB | Jacob Bedeau | 2 | 0 | 0 | 0 | 0 | 0 | 0 | 0 | 0 | 0 | 0 | 0 | 2 | 0 | 0 |
| 15 | 45 | (England) | CF | John McAtee | 2 | 0 | 0 | 0 | 0 | 0 | 0 | 0 | 0 | 0 | 0 | 0 | 2 | 0 | 0 |
| 21 | 15 | (Scotland) | RB | Jordan Lawrence-Gabriel | 1 | 0 | 0 | 0 | 0 | 0 | 0 | 0 | 0 | 0 | 0 | 0 | 1 | 0 | 0 |
| 21 | 35 | (England) | RB | Jai Rowe | 1 | 0 | 0 | 0 | 0 | 0 | 0 | 0 | 0 | 0 | 0 | 0 | 1 | 0 | 0 |
| 21 | 48 | (England) | CM | Joey Dawson | 0 | 0 | 0 | 0 | 0 | 0 | 1 | 0 | 0 | 0 | 0 | 0 | 1 | 0 | 0 |
| Total | | | | | 67 | 1 | 5 | 2 | 0 | 0 | 2 | 0 | 0 | 3 | 0 | 1 | 74 | 1 | 6 |

== Transfers ==
=== Transfers in ===
| Date from | Position | Nationality | Name | From | Fee | Ref. |
|---|---|---|---|---|---|---|
| 1 July 2019 | CB | (England) | Andy Butler | (England) Doncaster Rovers | Free transfer | |
| 4 July 2019 | LB | (South Africa) | Kgosi Ntlhe | (England) Rochdale | Free transfer | |
| 8 July 2019 | RM | (England) | Jack Lambert | (Scotland) Dundee | Free transfer | |
| 8 July 2019 | FW | (England) | John McAtee | (England) Shrewsbury Town | Free transfer | |
| 9 July 2019 | RW | (England) | Alex Gilliead | (England) Shrewsbury Town | Undisclosed | |
| 14 July 2019 | CB | (Cameroon) | Yann Songo'o | (England) Plymouth Argyle | Free transfer | |
| 15 August 2019 | LW | (Sudan) | Abo Eisa | (England) Shrewsbury Town | Undisclosed | |
| 27 September 2019 | LW | (Northern Ireland) | Jamie Ward | (England) Nottingham Forest | Free transfer | |
| 15 January 2020 | AM | (England) | Alfie Beestin | (England) Tadcaster Albion | Free transfer | |
| 31 January 2020 | CF | (England) | Devarn Green | (England) Southport | Undisclosed | |

=== Loans in ===
| Date from | Position | Nationality | Name | From | Date until | Ref. |
|---|---|---|---|---|---|---|
| 5 July 2019 | GK | (England) | Jake Eastwood | (England) Sheffield United | January 2020 | |
| 27 July 2019 | DM | (England) | Regan Slater | (England) Sheffield United | 30 June 2020 | |
| 22 August 2019 | CF | (England) | George Miller | (England) Barnsley | 30 June 2020 | |
| 29 August 2019 | LB | (England) | Junior Brown | (England) Coventry City | 25 April 2020 | |
| 30 August 2019 | CF | (England) | Jamie Proctor | (England) Rotherham United | January 2020 | |
| 24 January 2020 | RB | (England) | Jordan Gabriel | (England) Nottingham Forest | 30 June 2020 | |
| 27 January 2020 | GK | (Republic of Ireland) | Ian Lawlor | (England) Doncaster Rovers | 30 June 2020 | |
| 31 January 2020 | DM | (England) | Ben Liddle | (England) Middlesbrough | 30 June 2020 | |

=== Loans out ===
| Date from | Position | Nationality | Name | To | Date until | Ref. |
|---|---|---|---|---|---|---|
| 24 July 2019 | CB | (Australia) | Cameron Burgess | (England) Salford City | 30 June 2020 | |
| 29 July 2019 | CF | (England) | Olufela Olomola | (England) Carlisle United | 30 June 2020 | |
| 30 August 2019 | CF | (England) | Kyle Wootton | (England) Notts County | 8 January 2020 | |
| 27 September 2019 | LM | (England) | Adam Hammill | (England) Stockport County | 1 January 2020 | |
| 17 October 2019 | DM | (England) | James Horsfield | (Wales) Wrexham | November 2019 | |
| 15 November 2019 | RM | (England) | Jack Lambert | (England) Darlington | 13 December 2019 | |
| 9 January 2020 | LW | (England) | Andy Dales | (Scotland) Hamilton Academical | 30 June 2020 | |
| 10 January 2020 | LB | (England) | Lewis Butroid | (England) Spennymoor Town | April 2020 | |
| 24 January 2020 | RM | (England) | Jack Lambert | (England) Blyth Spartans | February 2020 | |
| 24 January 2020 | FW | (England) | Reon Potts | (England) Lincoln United | February 2020 | |
| 6 March 2020 | CB | (England) | Jo Cummings | (England) Radcliffe | 30 June 2020 | |
| 6 March 2020 | RM | (England) | Jack Lambert | (England) Darlington | 30 June 2020 | |

=== Transfers out ===
| Date from | Position | Nationality | Name | To | Fee | Ref. |
|---|---|---|---|---|---|---|
| 1 July 2019 | GK | (England) | Jonathan Flatt | (England) Rushall Olympic | Released | |
| 1 July 2019 | LM | (England) | Josh Morris | (England) Fleetwood Town | Released | |
| 1 July 2019 | CB | (England) | Byron Webster | (England) Carlisle United | Released | |
| 3 July 2019 | CB | (England) | Charlie Goode | (England) Northampton Town | Undisclosed | |
| 14 July 2019 | DM | (Belgium) | Funso Ojo | (Scotland) Aberdeen | £125,000 | |
| 31 October 2019 | CM | (New Zealand) | Clayton Lewis | Free agent | Mutual consent | |
| 8 January 2020 | CF | (England) | Kyle Wootton | (England) Notts County | Undisclosed | |
| 31 January 2020 | CM | (Northern Ireland) | Matty Lund | (England) Rochdale | Undisclosed | |
| 31 January 2020 | CF | (England) | Lee Novak | (England) Bradford City | Undisclosed | |

Jamie ward
