= Aaron Jarvis (footballer) =

English association football player

Personal information
- Full name: Aaron Derek Ahmad Jarvis
- Date of birth: 24 January 1998 (age 28)
- Place of birth: Basingstoke, England
- Height: 1.88 m (6 ft 2 in)
- Position: Striker

Team information
- Current team: Hednesford Town

Youth career
- –2016: Basingstoke Town

Senior career*
| Years | Team | Apps | (Gls) |
| 2016–2017 | Basingstoke Town | 47 | (14) |
| 2017–2019 | Luton Town | 5 | (0) |
| 2017–2018 | → Boreham Wood (loan) | 4 | (0) |
| 2019 | → Falkirk (loan) | 12 | (0) |
| 2019–2020 | Sutton United | 25 | (3) |
| 2020 | → Hemel Hempstead Town (loan) | 6 | (1) |
| 2020–2022 | Scunthorpe United | 32 | (4) |
| 2022–2024 | Torquay United | 56 | (24) |
| 2024–2026 | Yeovil Town | 59 | (10) |
| 2026– | Hednesford Town | 0 | (0) |
- * Club domestic league appearances and goals as of 23:15, 29 June 2026 (UTC)

Aaron Derek Ahmad Jarvis (born 24 January 1998) is an English professional footballer who plays as a striker for National League North club Hednesford Town.

== Career ==
=== Basingstoke Town ===
Jarvis was born in Basingstoke, Hampshire. He signed a first-team contract with Basingstoke Town in May 2016, having progressed through the club's youth system.

=== Luton Town ===
On 31 August 2017, Jarvis signed for League Two club Luton Town on a one-year contract, with the option of a further year for an undisclosed fee. He made his debut as an 87th-minute substitute for James Collins in a 0–0 draw away to Morecambe on 26 September.

He joined National League club Boreham Wood on a one-month youth loan on 22 December, having made four appearances and scored one goal for Luton up to that point in 2017–18. Jarvis only made the starting lineup once for Boreham Wood, with three of his four appearances for the club coming as a substitute. He joined Scottish Championship club Falkirk on 31 January 2019 on loan until the end of 2018–19. Jarvis was released by Luton when his contract expired at the end of the 2018–19 season.

=== Sutton United ===
Jarvis signed for National League club Sutton United on the 12th of July 2019 on a contract of undisclosed length. He was loaned to National League South club Hemel Hempstead Town on 28 January 2020.

=== Scunthorpe United ===
He signed for League Two club Scunthorpe United on 3 August 2020 on a two-year contract. He was released by Scunthorpe at the end of the 2021–22 season.

=== Torquay United ===
Jarvis signed for National League side Torquay United on 1 July 2022.

On 15 April 2023, he scored his second hat-trick of the season against York City, becoming the first Torquay player to scored 2 hat-tricks in the same season since Robin Stubbs in 1965/66

=== Yeovil Town ===
On 14 June 2024, Jarvis signed with National League club Yeovil Town on a two-year deal. He was released by Yeovil Town at the end of the 2025–26 season.

== Personal life ==
Prior to becoming a professional footballer with Luton Town, Jarvis was employed by Tesco.

== Career statistics ==
As of end of 2025–26 season

Appearances and goals by club, season and competition
| Club | Season | League | | | National Cup | | League Cup | | Other | | Total | |
| Club | Season | Division | Apps | Goals | Apps | Goals | Apps | Goals | Apps | Goals | Apps | Goals |
|---|---|---|---|---|---|---|---|---|---|---|---|---|
| Basingstoke Town | 2015–16 | National League South | 2 | 0 | 0 | 0 | — | | 0 | 0 | 2 | 0 |
| Basingstoke Town | 2016–17 | Southern League Premier Division | 40 | 12 | 2 | 0 | — | | 10 (Note: Five appearances and two goals in Hampshire Senior Cup, three appearances and one goal in Southern League Cup, two appearances and one goal in FA Trophy) | 4 | 52 | 16 |
| Basingstoke Town | 2017–18 | Southern League Premier Division | 5 | 2 | — | | — | | — | | 5 | 2 |
| Basingstoke Town | Total | | 47 | 14 | 2 | 0 | — | | 10 | 4 | 59 | 18 |
| Luton Town | 2017–18 | League Two | 1 | 0 | 0 | 0 | — | | 3 (Note: Appearances in EFL Trophy) | 1 | 4 | 1 |
| Luton Town | 2018–19 | League One | 4 | 0 | 2 | 0 | 0 | 0 | 4 | 1 | 10 | 1 |
| Luton Town | Total | | 5 | 0 | 2 | 0 | 0 | 0 | 7 | 2 | 14 | 2 |
| Boreham Wood (loan) | 2017–18 | National League | 4 | 0 | — | | — | | 0 | 0 | 4 | 0 |
| Falkirk (loan) | 2018–19 | Scottish Championship | 12 | 0 | — | | — | | — | | 12 | 0 |
| Sutton United | 2019–20 | National League | 25 | 3 | 2 | 0 | — | | 0 | 0 | 27 | 3 |
| Hemel Hempstead Town (loan) | 2019–20 | National League South | 6 | 1 | — | | — | | 4 (Note: Three appearances in Herts Senior Cup, one appearance and two goals in Herts Charity Cup) | 2 | 10 | 3 |
| Scunthorpe United | 2020–21 | League Two | 13 | 2 | 0 | 0 | 1 | 0 | 2 | 0 | 16 | 2 |
| Scunthorpe United | 2021–22 | League Two | 19 | 2 | 1 | 0 | 0 | 0 | 2 | 0 | 22 | 2 |
| Scunthorpe United | Total | | 32 | 4 | 1 | 0 | 1 | 0 | 4 | 0 | 38 | 4 |
| Torquay United | 2022–23 | National League | 37 | 15 | 4 | 1 | — | | 3 (Note: Appearances in FA Trophy) | 2 | 44 | 18 |
| Torquay United | 2023–24 | National League South | 19 | 9 | 1 | 0 | — | | 0 | 0 | 20 | 9 |
| Torquay United | Total | | 56 | 24 | 5 | 1 | — | | 3 | 2 | 64 | 27 |
| Yeovil Town | 2024–25 | National League | 27 | 7 | 0 | 0 | — | | 1 | 1 | 28 | 8 |
| Yeovil Town | 2025–26 | National League | 32 | 3 | 0 | 0 | — | | 3 | 0 | 35 | 3 |
| Yeovil Town | Total | | 59 | 10 | 0 | 0 | — | | 4 | 1 | 63 | 11 |
| Career total | | | 246 | 56 | 12 | 1 | 1 | 0 | 32 | 11 | 291 | 68 |

== Honours ==
Individual

- Torquay United Player of the Season: 2022–23
