= Jack Lambert (footballer, born 1999) =

English footballer (born 1999)

Personal information
- Full name: Jack Lambert
- Date of birth: 19 March 1999 (age 27)
- Place of birth: Newcastle upon Tyne, England
- Height: 5 ft 10 in (1.78 m)
- Position: Midfielder

Team information
- Current team: AFC Telford United
- Number: 11

Youth career
- –2017: Middlesbrough

Senior career*
| Years | Team | Apps | (Gls) |
| 2017–2019 | Dundee | 5 | (0) |
| 2019–2020 | Scunthorpe United | 0 | (0) |
| 2019–2020 | → Darlington (loan) | 8 | (0) |
| 2020 | → Blyth Spartans (loan) | 3 | (0) |
| 2020 | → Darlington (loan) | 0 | (0) |
| 2020 | ÍBV | 3 | (1) |
| 2021 | Hebburn Town | 0 | (0) |
| 2021–2023 | Darlington | 71 | (20) |
| 2023–2025 | Kidderminster Harriers | 38 | (3) |
| 2024–2025 | → Darlington (loan) | 9 | (1) |
| 2025 | Chester | 23 | (1) |
| 2025–2026 | King's Lynn Town | 0 | (0) |
| 2026– | AFC Telford United | 0 | (0) |
- * Club domestic league appearances and goals as of 13:01, 12 March 2025 (UTC)

Jack Lambert (born 19 March 1999) is an English professional footballer who plays as a midfielder for National League North club AFC Telford United.

He began his career in Middlesbrough's youth system, made his senior debut in the Scottish Premiership with Dundee, and after joining Scunthorpe United in 2019, spent time on loan at National League North clubs Darlington (two spells) and Blyth Spartans. He spent a short spell in Icelandic football with ÍBV before returning to English non-league football with Hebburn Town. Lambert rejoined Darlington in 2021, and moved on to Kidderminster Harriers in 2023. He returned to Darlington on loan during the 2024–25 season and was then released to sign for Chester.

== Club career ==
Lambert came through Middlesbrough's youth system, before joining Scottish Premiership club Dundee in 2017. He made his professional debut at home to Celtic on 26 December 2017, replacing Faissal El Bakhtaoui after an hour of the 2–0 league defeat, and signed a new contract in January 2018. Lambert made five Premiership appearances for Dundee, seven in all first-team competitions, before he was released at the end of the 2018–19 season.

Lambert returned to England and signed for League Two club Scunthorpe United in July 2019, as part of their under-23 side. He joined National League North club Darlington on 15 November on a month's loan, and made his debut the following day as a half-time substitute with his new team already 5–0 down away to Brackley Town. The loan was extended for a second month, and he made eight league appearances before returning to his parent club. After a month on loan at another National League North club, Blyth Spartans, during which he made three league starts, he returned to Darlington on 6 March 2020 for the rest of the season, but was not used in either of the matches played before the season was curtailed because of the COVID-19 pandemic. He was released by Scunthorpe at the end of the season.

On 7 September 2020, Lambert joined Icelandic 1. deild side ÍBV until the end of the season, but the league was suspended and then abandoned in October because of COVID-19, by which time he had scored once from three matches.

Lambert joined Hebburn Town on 13 March 2021 until the end of the season. Although the Northern League campaign had already been abandoned, he played twice in the 2020–21 FA Vase, but not in the 2020 FA Vase Final, rescheduled from the end of the previous season, in which Hebburn beat Consett 3–2 at Wembley.

In September 2021, he rejoined Darlington on non-contract terms. On 12 November, after two goals from seven league appearances, he signed a contract with Darlington, and finished the season with eight goals from 35 appearances in all competitions. In 2022–23, he had twelve goals before Christmas, and amid interest from EFL clubs, Darlington were hoping to persuade him to accept another contract; he stayed with the club, without a new contract, and finished the season with sixteen goals. On 20 May 2023, Darlington announced that Lambert would leave the club at the end of the season.

On 13 June 2023, Lambert joined National League club Kidderminster Harriers on a two-year deal.

Having played little during the early part of the 2024–25 season, Lambert rejoined Darlington on 29 November 2024 on loan until 1 January 2025. He scored once in seven appearances before the loan was extended for a further month.

Kidderminster released Lambert by mutual consent on 14 February 2025, and later that day he joined National League North leaders Chester on a short-term deal until the end of the season.

== Career statistics ==
As of match played 11 March 2025

Appearances and goals by club, season and competition
| Club | Season | League | | | National cup (Note: Includes Scottish Cup, FA Cup) | | League cup (Note: Includes Scottish League Cup, EFL Cup) | | Other | | Total | |
| Club | Season | Division | Apps | Goals | Apps | Goals | Apps | Goals | Apps | Goals | Apps | Goals |
|---|---|---|---|---|---|---|---|---|---|---|---|---|
| Dundee | 2017–18 | Scottish Premiership | 1 | 0 | 1 | 0 | 0 | 0 | — | | 2 | 0 |
| Dundee | 2018–19 | Scottish Premiership | 4 | 0 | 1 | 0 | 0 | 0 | — | | 5 | 0 |
| Dundee | Total | | 5 | 0 | 2 | 0 | 0 | 0 | — | | 7 | 0 |
| Dundee U20/U21 | 2017–18 | — | | | — | | — | | 1 (Note: Appearances in the Scottish Challenge Cup, in which age-restricted sides from the Scottish Premiership clubs compete against lower-division SPFL clubs) | 0 | 1 | 0 |
| Dundee U20/U21 | 2018–19 | — | | | — | | — | | 2 | 0 | 2 | 0 |
| Dundee U20/U21 | Total | | — | | — | | — | | 3 | 0 | 3 | 0 |
| Scunthorpe United | 2019–20 | League Two | 0 | 0 | 0 | 0 | 0 | 0 | 0 | 0 | 0 | 0 |
| Darlington (loan) | 2019–20 | National League North | 8 | 0 | — | | — | | 3 (Note: Appearance(s) in FA Trophy) | 2 | 11 | 2 |
| Blyth Spartans (loan) | 2019–20 | National League North | 3 | 0 | — | | — | | — | | 3 | 0 |
| Darlington (loan) | 2019–20 | National League North | 0 | 0 | — | | — | | — | | 0 | 0 |
| ÍBV | 2020 | 1. deild karla | 3 | 1 | — | | — | | — | | 3 | 1 |
| Hebburn Town | 2020–21 | Northern League | — | | — | | — | | 2 (Note: Appearances in FA Vase) | 0 | 2 | 0 |
| Darlington | 2021–22 | National League North | 33 | 8 | 1 | 0 | — | | 1 | 0 | 35 | 8 |
| Darlington | 2022–23 | National League North | 38 | 12 | 2 | 0 | — | | 3 | 4 | 43 | 16 |
| Darlington | Total | | 71 | 20 | 3 | 0 | — | | 4 | 4 | 78 | 24 |
| Kidderminster Harriers | 2023–24 | National League | 32 | 3 | 0 | 0 | — | | 2 | 0 | 34 | 3 |
| Kidderminster Harriers | 2024–25 | National League North | 6 | 0 | 4 | 1 | — | | 0 | 0 | 10 | 1 |
| Kidderminster Harriers | Total | | 38 | 3 | 4 | 1 | — | | 2 | 0 | 44 | 4 |
| Darlington (loan) | 2024–25 | National League North | 9 | 1 | — | | — | | 1 | 0 | 10 | 1 |
| Chester | 2024–25 | National League North | 5 | 0 | — | | — | | — | | 5 | 0 |
| Career total | | | 142 | 25 | 9 | 1 | 0 | 0 | 15 | 6 | 166 | 32 |

== Honours ==
Individual

- National League North Player of the Month: November 2022
