= 2025–26 Northern Premier League =

The 2025–26 season is the 58th season of the Northern Premier League. The league consists of four divisions, the Premier Division at Step 3 of the National League System, and the West, East and Midlands divisions at Step 4.

== Premier Division ==
Northern Premier League Premier Division
- Season: 2025–26
- Champions: Hebburn Town
- Promoted: Hebburn Town; Hednesford Town
- Relegated: Stocksbridge Park Steels; Morpeth Town; Prescot Cables; Widnes
- Matches: 418
- Goals: 1,078 (2.58 per match)
- Top goalscorer: (England) Gary Martin Hebburn Town (25 Goals)
- Highest attendance: 4,784 Hednesford Town 1–1 FC United of Manchester 27 December 2025
- Lowest attendance: 153 Stocksbridge Park Steels 0–1 Rushall Olympic 5 November 2025
- Total attendance: 282,323
- Average attendance: 675 or 671

The Premier Division consists of 22 teams, 16 from the previous season and six new teams.

=== Team changes ===
To the Premier Division

Promoted from Division One East

- Cleethorpes Town
- Stocksbridge Park Steels

Promoted from Division One West

- Hednesford Town
- Widnes (Resigned)

Relegated from the National League North

- Rushall Olympic
- Warrington Town

From the Premier Division

Promoted to the National League North

- Macclesfield
- Worksop Town

Relegated to Division One East

- Blyth Spartans
- Matlock Town

Relegated to Division One Midlands

- Basford United
- Mickleover

=== Premier Division table ===
Pos	Team	Pld	W	D	L	GF	GA	GD	Pts	Promotion, qualification or relegation
1	Hebburn Town (C, P)	40	23	10	7	75	41	+34	79	Promotion to the National League North
2	Hednesford Town (O, P)	40	22	11	7	62	35	+27	77	Qualification for the play-offs (Note: Four teams play for one spot and promotion to the National League North)
3	FC United of Manchester	40	21	9	10	65	41	+24	72	Qualification for the play-offs
4	Warrington Rylands 1906	40	18	13	9	59	42	+17	67	Qualification for the play-offs
5	Stockton Town	40	18	12	10	62	50	+12	63 (Note: Stockton Town were deducted three points for fielding an ineligible player against Warrington Rylands 1906.)	Qualification for the play-offs
6	Lancaster City	40	17	11	12	56	45	+11	62	
7	Gainsborough Trinity	40	16	11	13	50	45	+5	59	
8	Leek Town	40	17	7	16	50	52	−2	58	
9	Cleethorpes Town	40	14	13	13	56	47	+9	55	
10	Ashton United	40	14	11	15	47	54	−7	53	
11	Ilkeston Town	40	15	7	18	52	54	−2	52	
12	Bamber Bridge	40	14	8	18	52	52	0	50	
13	Guiseley	40	13	9	18	46	56	−10	48	
14	Warrington Town	40	12	12	16	43	63	−20	48	
15	Hyde United	40	11	14	15	58	63	−5	47	
16	Rushall Olympic	40	12	11	17	48	61	−13	47	Transferred to the Southern League Premier Division Central
17	Whitby Town	40	10	13	17	43	55	−12	43	
18	Workington	40	10	13	17	43	58	−15	43	
19	Prescot Cables (R)	40	9	15	16	40	50	−10	42	Relegation to Division One West
20	Morpeth Town (R)	40	12	6	22	38	54	−16	42	Relegation to Division One East
21	Stocksbridge Park Steels (R)	40	8	12	20	38	65	−27	36	Relegation to Division One East
22	Widnes	0	0	0	0	0	0	0	0	Resigned from the league and folded (Note: On 29 June 2025, Widnes resigned from the NPL, prior to the season's start.)

Source: NPL official site
Rules for classification: 1) points; 2) goal difference; 3) number of goals scored; 4) number of matches won; 5) head-to-head results
(C) Champions; (O) Play-off winners; (P) Promoted; (R) Relegated

=== Play-offs ===
Semi-finals
2	Hednesford Town	2
5	Stockton Town	0
3	FC United of Manchester	2
4	Warrington Rylands 1906	3

Final
2	Hednesford Town	1 (5)
4	Warrington Rylands 1906	1 (4)

==== Semifinals ====
28 April 2026	Hednesford Town	2–0	Stockton Town	Hednesford
19:45 GMT	Gibson 43'; Harrison 75'	Report	Arjun Purewal (red card) 40'	Stadium: Keys Park; Attendance: 3,535

28 April 2026	FC United of Manchester	2–3	Warrington Rylands 1906	Moston
19:45 GMT	Palinkas 3'; Evans 49'	Report	Hardcastle 41'; Smith 59'; Waring 69'	Stadium: Broadhurst Park; Attendance: 2,180

==== Final ====
4 May 2026	Hednesford Town	1–1 (a.e.t.) (5–4 p)	Warrington Rylands 1906	Hednesford
15:00 GMT	George Williams 90'+1	Report	Clive Smith 48'	Stadium: Keys Park; Attendance: 4,029

=== Results table ===
Home \ Away	ASH	BAM	CLE	UOM	GAI	GUI	HEB	HED	HYD	ILK	LNC	LEE	MOR	PRE	RUS	SPS	STN	WRY	WRT	WHI	WRK
Ashton United	—	1–1	0–4	3–1	0–3	1–1	2–0	0–1	1–1	0–0	1–3	0–1	3–2	0–0	2–1	1–0	1–2	2–1	1–0	1–4	2–1
Bamber Bridge	0–1	—	0–2	0–2	1–3	2–0	1–2	1–3	4–0	2–0	1–1	3–2	0–2	1–0	4–0	2–2	2–2	3–1	1–2	1–1	1–2
Cleethorpes Town	2–2	1–1	—	2–1	0–1	2–1	2–4	0–1	3–1	0–0	2–2	3–0	3–1	1–1	0–0	2–1	1–2	1–2	4–1	0–3	2–1
FC United of Manchester	0–1	2–0	2–0	—	1–1	2–0	1–0	1–2	0–1	2–1	2–1	2–0	0–0	2–1	3–1	4–0	1–1	0–1	2–2	3–1	2–2
Gainsborough Trinity	0–3	0–1	2–0	0–1	—	2–1	1–4	1–1	2–0	0–0	0–0	2–0	1–0	1–2	1–1	1–1	2–0	0–0	2–0	1–0	3–3
Guiseley	4–2	0–2	1–1	2–5	3–2	—	4–0	1–5	1–1	1–4	0–0	1–0	3–1	3–1	0–1	1–1	1–1	0–1	4–0	1–0	1–1
Hebburn Town	1–0	2–0	2–1	1–1	2–1	1–0	—	0–1	3–3	5–0	4–1	3–3	2–1	0–0	2–0	3–0	1–0	1–1	8–0	3–1	2–1
Hednesford Town	3–3	3–0	1–0	1–1	2–0	2–0	1–1	—	2–1	2–1	3–0	1–0	4–0	3–0	1–1	2–0	1–2	1–1	2–1	0–0	2–0
Hyde United	1–0	1–0	2–2	2–2	3–1	0–2	1–3	5–0	—	2–2	1–0	1–2	2–0	2–2	1–2	2–2	3–0	0–0	1–4	5–2	0–1
Ilkeston Town	0–2	2–0	0–3	3–2	0–1	1–0	3–2	0–3	3–0	—	3–0	1–3	3–1	2–0	5–1	0–1	0–1	2–2	1–1	0–1	3–2
Lancaster City	3–2	1–3	0–0	0–2	3–0	0–0	3–2	0–0	1–1	3–1	—	2–1	3–0	1–0	0–1	2–0	1–2	2–0	1–2	0–0	2–0
Leek Town	2–0	3–2	2–1	0–1	1–0	4–0	0–0	0–2	2–2	1–2	0–1	—	1–0	1–0	0–3	1–2	0–0	0–2	3–1	3–2	2–2
Morpeth Town	1–1	2–1	1–2	1–0	1–1	0–1	1–1	1–0	1–0	1–2	0–1	0–1	—	2–0	1–0	3–0	0–2	0–4	2–0	3–0	2–0
Prescot Cables	1–1	2–0	2–2	1–0	2–2	2–0	0–2	3–0	0–1	1–2	0–4	1–1	2–1	—	1–1	1–2	0–0	3–0	1–1	2–1	1–1
Rushall Olympic	1–0	0–0	2–1	2–3	1–1	1–3	0–1	1–0	0–2	2–0	2–3	5–1	1–0	0–2	—	1–3	2–2	1–1	2–3	2–2	3–3
Stocksbridge Park Steels	2–0	0–2	1–3	0–3	0–2	1–3	1–2	1–1	1–1	0–0	1–4	0–2	1–1	2–1	0–1	—	1–1	0–0	2–1	4–1	0–1
Stockton Town	1–2	2–2	2–1	2–3	1–0	2–0	4–1	1–2	2–2	0–4	1–1	1–2	2–0	3–1	2–4	3–2	—	3–1	2–1	0–0	6–0
Warrington Rylands 1906	1–1	1–0	0–1	1–2	4–2	1–0	1–1	2–2	4–2	3–1	2–0	2–0	4–3	1–1	3–0	3–2	1–2	—	1–1	0–1	3–0
Warrington Town	2–1	0–2	0–0	3–0	0–3	2–0	0–0	0–0	2–1	1–0	3–2	1–1	0–0	2–1	0–0	1–1	2–0	0–1	—	0–2	2–3
Whitby Town	1–2	0–2	0–0	1–3	1–2	1–1	0–2	2–1	1–1	1–0	1–3	0–3	1–2	0–0	3–1	0–0	1–1	1–1	4–0	—	0–0
Workington	1–1	1–3	1–1	0–0	1–2	0–1	0–1	3–0	3–2	1–0	1–1	0–1	1–0	1–1	1–0	2–0	0–1	0–1	1–1	1–2	—

Source: NPL official site
Legend: Blue = home team win; Yellow = draw; Red = away team win.

=== Top goalscorers ===
Rank	Player	Club	Goals
1	(England) Gary Martin	Hebburn Town	26
2	(England) Josh Walker	Cleethorpes Town	16
3	(England) Ewan Bange	Bamber Bridge	15
3	(England) Jay Fitzmartin	FC United of Manchester	15
3	(England) Adam Le Fondre	FC United Of Manchester	15
6	(England) Ben Hardcastle	Warrington Rylands	14
6	(England) Kevin Hayes	Stockton Town	14
6	(England) Jordan Thewlis	Guiseley	14
9	(Jamaica) Ahkeem Rose	Hednesford Town	13
9	(England) Connor Heath	Leek Town	13
9	(England) Joshua Scott	Stockton Town	13
9	(England) Nic Evangelinos	Lancaster City	13

=== Stadia and locations ===
2025–26 Premier Division teams
Locations of Northern Premier League 2025–26 Premier Division teams (Greater Manchester)

Club	Location	Ground	Capacity
Ashton United	Ashton-under-Lyne	Hurst Cross	4,500
Bamber Bridge	Bamber Bridge	Irongate	2,642
Cleethorpes Town	Grimsby	Clee Road	1,000
FC United of Manchester	Manchester (Moston)	Broadhurst Park	4,400
Gainsborough Trinity	Gainsborough	The Northolme	4,304
Guiseley	Guiseley	Nethermoor Park	4,000
Hebburn Town	Hebburn	The Green Energy Sports Ground	1,500
Hednesford Town	Hednesford	Keys Park	6,039
Hyde United	Hyde	Ewen Fields	4,250
Ilkeston Town	Ilkeston	New Manor Ground	3,029
Lancaster City	Lancaster	The Giant Axe	3,500
Leek Town	Leek	Harrison Park	3,600
Morpeth Town	Morpeth	Craik Park	1,500
Prescot Cables	Prescot	IP Truck Parts Stadium	2,070
Rushall Olympic	Walsall (Rushall)	Dales Lane	1,400
Stocksbridge Park Steels	Stocksbridge	Bracken Moor	3,500
Stockton Town	Stockton	Bishopton Road West	2,200
Warrington Rylands 1906	Warrington	Gorsey Lane	1,345
Warrington Town	Warrington	Cantilever Park	2,500
Whitby Town	Whitby	Turnbull Ground	3,500
Workington	Workington	Borough Park	3,101

== Division One East ==
Northern Premier League Division One East
- Season: 2025–26
- Champions: Redcar Athletic
- Promoted: Redcar Athletic; Emley
- Relegated: Brighouse Town; Newton Aycliffe; Blyth Town; Bishop Auckland
- Matches: 462
- Goals: 1,347 (2.92 per match)
- Top goalscorer: (England) Adam Boyes Redcar Athletic (41 Goals)
- Biggest home win: Redcar Athletic 10–1 Silsden (13 September 2025)
- Biggest away win: Ashington 0–8 Redcar Athletic (21 February 2026)
- Highest scoring: Redcar Athletic 10–1 Silsden (13 September 2025)
- Highest attendance: 2,002 Blyth Town 2–0 Blyth Spartans 6 April 2026
- Lowest attendance: 101 Brighouse Town 0–3 Consett 11 April 2026
- Total attendance: 174,753
- Average attendance: 378

Division One East consists of 22 teams, 15 from the previous season and 7 new teams.

=== Team changes ===
To Division One East

Promoted from the Northern Counties East League Premier Division

- Hallam
- Silsden

Promoted from the Northern League Division One

- Blyth Town
- Redcar Athletic

Promoted from the United Counties League Premier Division North

- Lincoln United

Relegated from the Premier Division

- Blyth Spartans
- Matlock Town

From Division One East

Promoted to the Premier Division

- Cleethorpes Town
- Stocksbridge Park Steels

Transferred to Division One Midlands

- Belper Town
- Carlton Town

Relegated to the Northern Counties East League Premier Division

- Liversedge
- Sheffield

Relegated to the United Counties League Premier Division North

- Sherwood Colliery

=== Division One East table ===
Pos	Team	Pld	W	D	L	GF	GA	GD	Pts	Promotion, qualification or relegation
1	Redcar Athletic (C, P)	42	33	6	3	140	38	+102	105	Promotion to the Premier Division
2	Matlock Town	42	28	4	10	102	53	+49	88	Qualification for the play-offs
3	Emley (O, P)	42	22	11	9	68	31	+37	77	Qualification for the play-offs
4	Dunston	42	22	10	10	70	51	+19	76	Qualification for the play-offs
5	Bradford (Park Avenue)	42	21	12	9	67	34	+33	75	Qualification for the play-offs
6	Pontefract Collieries	42	21	11	10	76	62	+14	74	
7	Heaton Stannington	42	17	10	15	55	53	+2	61	
8	Bridlington Town	42	16	11	15	71	63	+8	59	
9	Garforth Town	42	16	10	16	66	51	+15	58	
10	Consett	42	16	10	16	74	66	+8	58	
11	North Ferriby	42	13	19	10	54	47	+7	58	
12	Hallam	42	13	14	15	50	57	−7	53	
13	Lincoln United	42	14	11	17	49	69	−20	53	
14	Ashington	42	14	9	19	45	77	−32	51	
15	Grimsby Borough	42	13	10	19	41	70	−29	49	
16	Blyth Spartans	42	13	8	21	47	53	−6	47	
17	Silsden	42	10	14	18	48	70	−22	44	
18	Ossett United	42	10	12	20	50	63	−13	42	
19	Bishop Auckland (R)	42	12	5	25	52	79	−27	41	Relegation to the Northern League Division One
20	Blyth Town (R)	42	12	5	25	42	76	−34	41	Relegation to the Northern League Division One
21	Newton Aycliffe (R)	42	9	9	24	49	86	−37	36	Relegation to the Northern League Division One
22	Brighouse Town (R)	42	8	7	27	31	98	−67	31	Resigned to the West Yorkshire League Division One (Note: On 6 May 2026, Brighouse Town applied for voluntary demotion to Step 7.)

Source: NPL official site
Rules for classification: 1) points; 2) goal difference; 3) number of goals scored; 4) number of matches won; 5) head-to-head results
(C) Champions; (O) Play-off winners; (P) Promoted; (R) Relegated

=== Play-offs ===
Semi-finals
2	Matlock Town	1
5	Bradford (Park Avenue)	2
3	Emley	1
4	Dunston	0

Final
3	Emley	0 (5)
5	Bradford (Park Avenue)	0 (4)

==== Semifinals ====
28 April 2026	Matlock Town	1–2	Bradford (Park Avenue)	Matlock
19:45 GMT	Wilson 45+2'		Carver 23'; Andreucci 85'	Stadium: Causeway Lane; Attendance: 1,268

28 April 2026	Emley	1–0	Dunston	Emley
19:45 GMT	Sorhaindo 18'			Stadium: Fantastic Media Welfare Ground; Attendance: 909

==== Final ====
2 May 2026	Emley	0–0 (a.e.t.) (5–4 p)	Bradford (Park Avenue)	Emley
15:00 GMT				Stadium: Fantastic Media Welfare Ground; Attendance: 1,771

=== Results table ===
Home \ Away	ASH	BIS	BLS	BLT	BPA	BLG	BGH	CON	DUN	EML	GAR	GRI	HAL	HEA	LIN	MAT	NEW	NOR	OSS	PON	RCA	SIL
Ashington	—	1–1	0–1	0–0	0–4	2–2	3–0	1–0	1–0	1–2	1–4	0–0	2–1	2–1	6–3	2–3	0–3	1–1	3–2	0–0	0–8	2–1
Bishop Auckland	0–1	—	2–3	1–0	0–3	0–2	1–1	0–2	3–3	2–1	1–0	0–2	0–1	2–0	5–0	2–4	2–3	1–4	4–1	1–3	4–3	0–1
Blyth Spartans	1–1	1–2	—	1–2	0–1	0–1	0–1	1–2	2–0	0–0	0–0	4–0	1–1	3–4	2–0	2–1	2–1	2–2	1–2	2–1	1–4	1–0
Blyth Town	2–2	3–2	2–0	—	0–2	1–3	3–1	1–6	0–2	0–1	2–4	2–0	0–3	1–0	0–3	0–3	4–2	0–0	0–1	1–3	0–1	0–1
Bradford (Park Avenue)	2–1	1–0	2–1	2–0	—	2–2	8–0	0–0	3–1	1–1	1–0	2–2	1–0	0–0	3–0	2–0	3–0	0–1	1–0	2–3	1–1	0–1
Bridlington Town	2–0	1–3	1–4	7–0	0–0	—	8–0	3–4	3–1	2–2	0–3	1–2	2–0	0–4	2–1	1–2	1–1	2–0	1–3	1–2	0–4	1–1
Brighouse Town	0–2	2–0	1–3	1–0	0–2	1–1	—	0–3	1–1	0–1	1–2	2–3	0–0	1–3	0–3	1–3	1–1	0–3	1–0	1–0	0–4	0–0
Consett	4–0	0–1	2–1	3–1	0–2	0–2	3–0	—	1–4	1–3	1–1	3–0	3–1	1–1	3–1	1–3	0–1	0–0	0–3	1–4	2–3	4–1
Dunston	2–0	3–1	3–0	3–0	1–0	2–1	2–0	2–2	—	3–1	1–1	2–1	1–3	3–1	5–0	1–1	1–1	1–0	0–0	1–2	1–4	2–1
Emley	3–0	0–2	1–0	1–0	1–0	3–0	5–0	3–3	3–0	—	1–1	0–1	0–0	0–2	2–0	1–3	6–0	0–2	3–1	4–0	0–0	3–0
Garforth Town	0–1	4–2	0–2	0–1	3–1	0–2	0–1	2–1	3–0	1–0	—	0–0	1–1	0–2	1–1	0–1	2–2	1–0	3–0	0–1	0–5	2–2
Grimsby Borough	0–0	3–1	1–0	0–1	1–3	1–2	3–2	2–1	0–1	0–2	0–5	—	2–4	4–1	1–1	0–1	1–0	0–0	1–1	0–2	0–3	0–1
Hallam	1–0	2–0	1–1	3–1	1–1	1–1	1–4	1–1	0–1	0–0	0–4	1–1	—	0–2	2–2	1–2	3–1	2–2	3–2	1–1	0–1	0–2
Heaton Stannington	1–0	2–0	1–1	2–2	2–1	1–3	2–0	1–5	1–1	1–2	1–0	4–0	0–1	—	1–0	1–0	0–0	0–1	2–1	0–1	0–4	1–1
Lincoln United	1–2	1–0	1–0	1–0	1–1	0–1	1–4	4–2	2–0	1–0	1–4	1–3	1–0	2–1	—	3–2	2–1	0–0	2–0	2–2	0–0	1–1
Matlock Town	5–0	3–1	1–0	6–2	0–0	3–2	2–1	3–0	1–2	0–4	3–3	5–0	2–0	2–3	3–0	—	7–2	4–1	1–0	7–1	2–0	4–0
Newton Aycliffe	5–2	4–0	1–0	0–1	2–0	0–0	2–1	1–1	0–3	0–1	1–3	0–2	1–3	0–3	2–2	2–3	—	0–1	0–1	0–1	1–4	1–6
North Ferriby	0–2	3–1	1–1	0–4	1–1	3–1	4–0	2–2	0–1	0–0	2–0	1–1	2–2	0–0	2–0	2–1	1–1	—	2–2	1–3	1–2	2–2
Ossett United	1–2	1–1	0–1	2–1	1–2	1–1	3–0	2–3	1–2	1–1	2–1	1–2	0–1	0–0	0–0	3–0	1–2	2–2	—	2–0	0–6	1–1
Pontefract Collieries	5–0	1–3	2–1	2–1	0–3	2–2	4–0	2–0	1–1	2–2	2–0	3–0	3–1	3–3	1–4	1–1	2–0	1–1	1–1	—	2–4	3–0
Redcar Athletic	1–0	5–0	1–0	1–1	4–1	2–1	7–0	2–2	3–3	0–2	4–3	6–1	4–1	3–0	4–0	4–2	6–2	3–0	3–2	5–1	—	10–1
Silsden	4–1	0–0	3–0	0–2	2–2	1–2	1–1	0–1	2–3	0–2	0–4	0–0	1–2	2–0	0–0	1–2	3–2	0–3	2–2	2–2	0–1	—

Source: NPL official site
Legend: Blue = home team win; Yellow = draw; Red = away team win.

=== Top goalscorers ===
Rank	Player	Club	Goals
1	(England) Adam Boyes	Redcar Athletic	41
2	(England) Cameron Wilson	Matlock Town	26
2	(England) Louis Johnson	Redcar Athletic	26
4	(England) Bradley Fewster	Redcar Athletic	24
5	(England) Marcus Carver	Bradford PA	20
6	(Northern Ireland) Conor Washington	Matlock Town	19
6	(England) Oscar Fletcher	Redcar Athletic	19
8	(England) Dale Pearson	Heaton Stannington	18
9	(England) Conor Brown	Lincoln United	16
9	(England) Frankie Sinfield	Pontefract Collieries	16

=== Stadia and locations ===
Locations of Northern Premier League 2025–26 Division One East teams

Team	Location	Stadium	Capacity
Ashington	Ashington	Woodhorn Lane	2,000
Bishop Auckland	Bishop Auckland	Heritage Park	1,950
Blyth Spartans	Blyth	Croft Park	4,435
Blyth Town	Blyth	South Newsham Playing Fields	1,000
Bradford (Park Avenue)	Bradford	Horsfall Stadium	3,500
Bridlington Town	Bridlington	Queensgate	3,000
Brighouse Town	Brighouse	St Giles Road	1,000
Consett	Consett	Belle View Stadium	3,770
Dunston	Dunston	Wellington Road	2,500
Emley	Emley	Fantastic Media Welfare Ground	2,000
Garforth Town	Garforth	Wheatley Park	3,000
Grimsby Borough	Grimsby	Bradley Football Centre	1,250
Hallam	Crosspool	Sandygate	1,665
Heaton Stannington	High Heaton	The Willow Park	2,000
Lincoln United	Lincoln	Ashby Avenue	2,714
Matlock Town	Matlock	Causeway Lane	2,400
Newton Aycliffe	Newton Aycliffe	Moore Lane	1,000
North Ferriby	North Ferriby	The Dransfield Stadium	3,000
Ossett United	Ossett	Ingfield	3,280
Pontefract Collieries	Pontefract	Harratt Nissan Stadium	1,200
Redcar Athletic	Redcar	Green Lane	1,000
Silsden	Silsden	Keighley Road Stadium	1,500

== Division One Midlands ==
Northern Premier League Division One Midlands
- Season: 2025–26
- Champions: Anstey Nomads
- Promoted: Antsey Nomads; Racing Club Warwick
- Relegated: Bourne Town; St Neots Town; Coventry Sphinx; Rugby Town
- Matches: 462
- Goals: 1,289 (2.79 per match)
- Top goalscorer: (England) Evan Garnett Long Eaton United (26 Goals)
- Biggest home win: Shepshed Dynamo 5–0 Racing Club Warwick 23 August 2025; Carlton Town 6–1 Corby Town 14 March 2026; Wellingborough Town 5–0 Bourne Town 28 March 2026
- Biggest away win: Corby Town 0–7 Long Eaton United 20 December 2025
- Highest scoring: Basford United 4–4 Sutton Coldfield Town 9 August 2025; Loughborough Students 5–3 Long Eaton United 7 October 2025; Sutton Coldfield Town 5–3 AFC Rushden & Diamonds 28 October 2025
- Highest attendance: 1,347 Antsey Nomads 1–0 Wellingborough Town 25 April 2026
- Lowest attendance: 63 Coventry Sphinx 2–2 Bourne Town 7 March 2026
- Total attendance: 136,305
- Average attendance: 295

Division One Midlands consists of 22 teams, 14 from the previous season and 8 new teams.

=== Team changes ===
To Division One Midlands

Promoted from the Midland League Premier Division

- Lichfield City

Promoted from the United Counties League Premier Division North

- Bourne Town

Promoted from the United Counties League Premier Division South

- Rugby Borough
- St Neots Town

Relegated from the Premier Division

- Basford United
- Mickleover

Transferred from Division One East

- Belper Town
- Carlton Town

From Division One Midlands

Promoted to the Southern League Premier Division Central

- Quorn
- Worcester City

Transferred to Division One West

- Darlaston Town 1874
- Sporting Khalsa

Relegated to the Midland League Premier Division

- Lye Town

Relegated to the United Counties League Premier Division North

- Grantham Town

Resigned

- Hinckley LRFC

Resigned from the league

- Walsall Wood

=== Division One Midlands table ===
Pos	Team	Pld	W	D	L	GF	GA	GD	Pts	Promotion, qualification or relegation
1	Anstey Nomads (C, P)	42	28	8	6	80	35	+45	92	Promotion to the Southern League Premier Division Central
2	Carlton Town	42	28	6	8	84	49	+35	90	Qualification for the play-offs
3	Basford United	42	19	12	11	63	56	+7	69	Qualification for the play-offs
4	Belper Town	42	19	11	12	65	50	+15	68	Qualification for the play-offs
5	Racing Club Warwick (O, P)	42	18	11	13	62	56	+6	65	Qualification for the play-offs
6	Coleshill Town	42	18	10	14	53	51	+2	64	
7	Shepshed Dynamo	42	18	9	15	52	44	+8	63	
8	Lichfield City	42	17	9	16	50	58	−8	60	Transferred to Division One West
9	Wellingborough Town	42	15	13	14	59	43	+16	58	
10	Long Eaton United	42	16	10	16	67	63	+4	58	
11	Sutton Coldfield Town	42	16	9	17	70	71	−1	57	
12	AFC Rushden & Diamonds	42	14	13	15	56	61	−5	55	
13	Corby Town	42	15	10	17	50	61	−11	55	
14	Boldmere St Michaels	42	16	6	20	53	70	−17	54	
15	Mickleover	42	14	11	17	62	69	−7	53	
16	Rugby Borough	42	13	13	16	52	49	+3	52	
17	Loughborough Students	42	13	13	16	64	63	+1	52	
18	Bedworth United	42	13	11	18	47	53	−6	50	
19	Bourne Town	42	12	7	23	54	70	−16	43	Reprive from relegation (Note: Bourne Town were reprieved from relegation due to the resignation of Mousehole from the Southern League Division One South.)
20	St Neots Town (R)	42	11	10	21	51	69	−18	43	Relegation to the United Counties League Premier Division South
21	Coventry Sphinx (R)	42	11	8	23	51	69	−18	41	Relegation to the United Counties League Premier Division South
22	Rugby Town (R)	42	9	8	25	44	79	−35	35	Relegation to the United Counties League Premier Division South

Source: NPL official site
Rules for classification: 1) points; 2) goal difference; 3) number of goals scored; 4) number of matches won; 5) head-to-head results
(C) Champions; (O) Play-off winners; (P) Promoted; (R) Relegated

=== Play-offs ===
Semi-finals
2	Carlton Town	0 (2)
5	Racing Club Warwick	0 (4)
3	Basford United	2 (3)
4	Belper Town	2 (4)

Final
4	Belper Town	1 (6)
5	Racing Club Warwick	1 (7)

==== Semifinals ====
28 April 2026	Carlton Town	0–0 (a.e.t.) (2–4 p)	Racing Club Warwick	Carlton
19:45 GMT				Stadium: Bill Stokeld Stadium; Attendance: 506

28 April 2026	Basford United	2–2 (a.e.t.) (3–4 p)	Belper Town	Basford
19:45 GMT	Palmer 30'; Peters 55'		Bastos 43'; Gratton 87'	Stadium: Greenwich Avenue; Attendance: 865

==== Final ====
2 May 2026	Belper Town	1–1 (a.e.t.) (6–7 p)	Racing Club Warwick	Belper
19:45 GMT				Stadium: Christchurch Meadow; Attendance: 1,702

=== Results table ===
Home \ Away	R&D	ANS	BAS	BED	BEL	BSM	BOU	CAR	COL	COR	CVS	LIC	LEU	LOU	MIC	RCW	RUB	RUT	SHD	SNT	SCT	WEL
AFC Rushden & Diamonds	—	2–2	4–2	1–0	1–2	1–3	0–0	1–3	2–2	0–1	2–1	1–1	2–1	2–2	0–0	1–0	1–1	2–0	1–1	1–1	2–0	0–1
Anstey Nomads	3–0	—	4–0	1–0	0–2	0–1	2–0	0–2	2–1	1–1	3–1	1–0	1–0	1–0	3–1	2–0	2–1	3–1	1–0	2–1	5–2	1–0
Basford United	0–0	2–1	—	0–1	0–0	3–1	2–0	2–2	1–2	2–1	2–1	1–0	1–1	3–0	1–2	3–1	2–1	2–2	1–1	4–0	4–4	2–1
Bedworth United	2–0	0–2	0–1	—	1–1	2–3	1–2	1–3	0–0	0–2	2–1	0–1	2–0	1–1	2–2	1–2	1–0	3–1	1–4	1–1	3–2	1–2
Belper Town	3–0	1–1	1–1	2–1	—	3–0	4–3	0–1	1–1	1–2	1–0	2–4	2–1	2–1	4–0	0–0	1–1	1–1	1–1	1–2	0–2	1–0
Boldmere St Michaels	0–1	1–4	1–4	1–2	2–0	—	3–2	1–3	3–1	0–0	4–1	1–2	3–1	1–2	1–2	0–3	2–3	0–0	1–0	0–0	3–3	0–2
Bourne Town	1–3	1–1	1–0	1–1	0–2	2–3	—	1–2	0–1	0–1	1–1	2–3	3–3	2–1	1–3	4–0	0–1	3–1	1–3	1–0	2–1	0–1
Carlton Town	3–2	0–6	1–1	1–2	3–1	4–0	2–1	—	0–1	6–1	4–1	0–1	4–1	0–3	3–1	1–1	2–1	2–1	2–1	2–1	5–1	0–0
Coleshill Town	0–3	1–1	0–1	1–0	2–0	0–1	2–1	2–1	—	2–2	1–0	2–3	1–1	3–2	3–1	1–2	1–0	3–0	2–0	1–3	1–0	1–1
Corby Town	1–3	1–2	0–1	0–2	2–1	1–0	0–1	0–1	2–2	—	1–3	4–1	0–7	1–1	0–1	1–1	1–1	1–0	1–0	2–1	1–2	1–1
Coventry Sphinx	0–1	1–3	2–0	2–2	1–2	2–0	2–2	2–3	1–1	0–2	—	3–1	0–2	2–1	2–0	0–1	2–3	1–0	0–2	2–3	1–3	1–4
Lichfield City	2–1	0–1	3–0	1–3	1–1	0–2	3–2	0–4	0–2	1–0	1–2	—	2–0	1–6	2–0	2–2	2–0	3–1	1–1	0–0	2–1	0–3
Long Eaton United	3–1	1–2	2–0	1–0	4–1	3–0	2–5	1–1	2–0	0–1	1–1	0–0	—	1–4	4–2	0–4	0–2	2–3	3–0	2–1	1–1	2–1
Loughborough Students	3–0	1–1	2–2	0–0	2–1	0–0	1–2	0–3	3–1	2–2	1–0	1–0	5–3	—	1–0	0–1	1–0	2–2	0–3	0–0	2–2	1–1
Mickleover	4–1	1–0	3–1	1–1	1–2	3–3	3–1	2–3	1–1	3–1	1–1	0–0	0–2	3–2	—	1–1	2–2	4–1	1–0	3–3	2–2	1–2
Racing Club Warwick	1–1	3–2	4–1	0–0	2–2	0–2	0–1	4–0	4–1	3–2	1–1	0–0	0–2	4–3	1–0	—	2–3	1–2	1–1	2–0	1–2	2–1
Rugby Borough	1–1	1–3	1–1	0–2	0–1	1–2	1–1	0–1	2–1	3–0	1–1	0–1	1–1	4–2	1–0	1–2	—	4–0	1–1	4–0	1–3	0–1
Rugby Town	0–3	0–3	2–3	1–1	1–4	1–2	0–3	1–2	2–1	1–2	3–0	3–2	1–2	1–0	0–3	1–0	0–1	—	0–1	1–1	0–3	2–2
Shepshed Dynamo	1–2	0–0	0–1	2–1	2–1	1–0	1–0	0–1	0–1	1–5	2–1	3–1	1–1	0–2	1–0	5–0	1–1	1–0	—	3–1	1–2	1–0
St Neots Town	3–2	1–3	0–1	1–0	1–3	1–2	2–0	1–2	2–1	2–0	0–3	0–1	2–3	3–2	1–2	1–2	0–0	2–2	1–2	—	2–3	1–0
Sutton Coldfield Town	5–3	2–3	2–2	1–3	0–3	3–0	2–0	1–1	0–1	0–2	1–3	1–0	2–0	0–0	4–0	1–2	0–1	0–3	1–0	2–4	—	2–0
Wellingborough Town	1–1	1–1	1–2	4–0	1–3	3–0	5–0	1–0	0–1	1–1	0–1	1–1	0–0	4–1	4–2	3–1	1–1	0–2	2–3	1–1	1–1	—

Source: NPL official site
Legend: Blue = home team win; Yellow = draw; Red = away team win.

=== Top goalscorers ===
Rank	Player	Club	Goals
1	(England) Evan Garnett	Long Eaton United	26
2	(England) Ashley Chambers	Carlton Town	21
3	(England) James Harding	Racing Club Warwick	19
4	(England) Lamin Manneh	Carlton Town	18
5	(Portugal) Bruno Andrade	AFC Rushden & Diamonds	16
5	(England) James McGrady	Sutton Coldfield Town	16
7	(England) Ashden Shortland	Loughborough Students	15
7	(England) Jude Collins	Shepshed Dynamo	15
7	(England) Reece Gibson	Sutton Coldfield Town	15
7	(England) Will Jones	Wellingborough Town	15

=== Stadia and locations ===
Locations of Northern Premier League 2025–26 Division One Midlands teams

Team	Location	Stadium	Capacity
AFC Rushden & Diamonds	Rushden	Hayden Road	2,955
Anstey Nomads	Anstey	Cropston Road	1,000
Basford United	Nottingham (Basford)	Greenwich Avenue	1,600
Bedworth United	Bedworth	The Oval	2,900
Belper Town	Belper	Christchurch Meadow	2,650
Boldmere St Michaels	Boldmere	Trevor Brown Memorial Ground	2,500
Bourne Town	Bourne	Abbey Lawn	2,000
Carlton Town	Carlton	Bill Stokeld Stadium	1,968
Coleshill Town	Coleshill	Pack Meadow	2,000
Corby Town	Corby	Steel Park	3,893
Coventry Sphinx	Coventry	Sphinx Drive	1,000
Lichfield City	Lichfield	City Ground	1,500
Long Eaton United	Long Eaton	Grange Park	1,500
Loughborough Students	Loughborough	Loughborough University Stadium	3,300
Mickleover	Mickleover	Station Road	1,500
Racing Club Warwick	Warwick	Townsend Meadow	2,100
Rugby Borough	Rugby	Kilsby Lane	1,000
Rugby Town	Rugby	Butlin Road	5,000
Shepshed Dynamo	Shepshed	The Dovecote Stadium	2,500
St Neots Town	St Neots	New Rowley Park	3,500
Sutton Coldfield Town	Sutton Coldfield	Coles Lane	2,000
Wellingborough Town	Wellingborough	Dog & Duck Football Ground	5,000

== Division One West ==
Northern Premier League Division One West
- Season: 2025–26
- Champions: Bury
- Promoted: Bury; Avro
- Relegated: Darlaston Town (1874); Sporting Khalsa; Wythenshawe Town; Trafford
- Matches: 462
- Goals: 1,431 (3.1 per match)
- Top goalscorer: (England) Kyle Hawley Avro (24 Goals)
- Biggest home win: Avro 13–0 Darlaston Town (1874) 25 April 2026
- Biggest away win: Runcorn Linnets 0–5 Witton Albion 1 January 2026; Newcastle Town 0–5 Stalybridge Celtic 14 March 2026; Wythenshawe Town 2–7 Vauxhall Motors 28 March 2026
- Highest scoring: Avro 13–0 Darlaston Town (1874) 25 April 2026
- Highest attendance: 7,052 Bury 4–1 Witton Albion 18 April 2026
- Lowest attendance: 71 Darlaston Town (1874) 1–3 Wythenshawe Town 18 April 2026
- Total attendance: 260,789
- Average attendance: 564

Division One West consists of 22 teams, 17 from the previous season and 5 new teams.

=== Team changes ===
To Division One West

Promoted from the Midland League Premier Division

- Shifnal Town

Promoted from the North West Counties League Premier Division

- Bury
- Lower Breck

Transferred from Division One Midlands

- Darlaston Town 1874
- Sporting Khalsa

From Division One West

Promoted to the Premier Division

- Hednesford Town
- Widnes

Relegated to the Midland League Premier Division

- Hanley Town

Relegated to the North West Counties League Premier Division

- City of Liverpool
- Wythenshawe

=== Division One West table ===
Pos	Team	Pld	W	D	L	GF	GA	GD	Pts	Promotion, qualification or relegation
1	Bury (C, P)	42	27	9	6	86	36	+50	90	Promotion to the Premier Division
2	Avro (O, P)	42	27	7	8	94	41	+53	88	Qualification for the play-offs
3	Stalybridge Celtic	42	25	7	10	88	55	+33	82	Qualification for the play-offs
4	Runcorn Linnets	42	23	11	8	76	45	+31	80	Qualification for the play-offs
5	Lower Breck	42	22	9	11	88	62	+26	75	Qualification for the play-offs
6	Bootle	42	21	11	10	69	48	+21	74	
7	Vauxhall Motors	42	20	12	10	94	70	+24	72	
8	Witton Albion	42	17	10	15	76	67	+9	61	
9	Nantwich Town	42	18	7	17	69	65	+4	61	
10	Chasetown	42	17	9	16	55	52	+3	60	
11	Mossley	42	14	17	11	59	53	+6	59	
12	Shifnal Town	42	15	10	17	60	67	−7	55	
13	Atherton Collieries	42	16	7	19	56	68	−12	55	
14	Newcastle Town	42	15	7	20	45	62	−17	52	
15	Clitheroe	42	13	12	17	64	67	−3	51	
16	Kidsgrove Athletic	42	12	11	19	62	78	−16	47	
17	Stafford Rangers	42	12	9	21	51	70	−19	45	
18	Congleton Town	42	10	14	18	60	72	−12	44	
19	Sporting Khalsa (R)	42	12	7	23	57	81	−24	43	Relegation to the Midland League Premier Division
20	Wythenshawe Town (R)	42	8	8	26	40	93	−53	32	Relegation to the Midland League Premier Division
21	Trafford (R)	42	7	8	27	49	80	−31	29	Relegation to the North West Counties League Premier Division
22	Darlaston Town (1874) (R)	42	7	6	29	33	99	−66	27	Relegation to the Midland League Premier Division

Source: NPL official site
Rules for classification: 1) points; 2) goal difference; 3) number of goals scored; 4) number of matches won; 5) head-to-head results
(C) Champions; (O) Play-off winners; (P) Promoted; (R) Relegated

=== Play-offs ===
Semi-finals
2	Avro	2 (4)
5	Lower Breck	2 (3)
3	Stalybridge Celtic	1
4	Runcorn Linnets	0

Final
2	Avro	4
3	Stalybridge Celtic	2

==== Semifinals ====
28 April 2026	Avro	2–2 (a.e.t.) (4–3 p)	Lower Breck	Oldham
19:45 GMT	Cottrell 52'; Molloy 90+27'		Buckley 90+3'; Barrow 90+6'	Stadium: Whitebank Stadium; Attendance: 609

28 April 2026	Stalybridge Celtic	1–0	Runcorn Linnets	Stalybridge
19:45 GMT	Scarisbrick 8'			Stadium: Bower Fold; Attendance: 1,562

==== Final ====
2 May 2026	Avro	4–2	Stalybridge Celtic	Oldham
15:00 GMT	Dyson 27'; Mason 67'; Simms 74'; Hawley 90+4'	Report	Tinning 47'; Horan 57'	Stadium: Whitebank Stadium; Attendance: 1,105

=== Results table ===
Home \ Away	ATC	AVR	BOO	BRY	CHA	CLI	CON	DAR	KGA	LWB	MOS	NAN	NEW	RUN	SHI	SPK	STR	SBC	TRA	VHM	WIT	WYT
Atherton Collieries	—	1–2	0–2	0–3	2–1	2–1	4–2	2–0	1–1	2–5	2–3	2–0	1–2	0–2	1–2	1–0	3–1	0–2	1–0	1–1	2–1	3–0
Avro	3–1	—	0–3	1–1	2–1	4–0	3–3	13–0	6–0	1–3	2–0	1–0	0–0	1–2	1–2	3–1	3–0	1–0	2–1	2–1	3–1	1–0
Bootle	2–1	3–2	—	1–1	1–0	0–1	0–1	3–0	2–2	1–3	2–0	1–2	5–0	0–0	2–2	0–1	1–0	1–3	1–0	3–3	1–2	2–1
Bury	0–0	1–1	2–1	—	4–0	2–0	4–1	2–2	2–0	0–2	2–1	1–0	1–0	1–0	3–0	2–0	3–2	0–2	9–0	0–2	4–1	5–2
Chasetown	1–2	1–2	6–0	0–1	—	2–0	2–1	2–1	2–2	1–0	0–0	0–2	3–0	1–2	1–0	3–1	0–0	2–1	1–1	0–0	2–4	2–0
Clitheroe	2–2	0–1	0–2	1–1	1–1	—	2–0	9–1	2–2	2–3	0–0	2–1	1–0	2–1	2–2	3–3	4–1	1–3	2–1	2–5	0–2	4–0
Congleton Town	0–0	0–2	1–1	0–0	2–2	2–2	—	1–0	1–1	2–3	2–2	0–2	0–0	1–1	2–0	1–0	2–0	2–4	4–0	3–3	2–1	4–0
Darlaston Town (1874)	2–0	1–0	1–2	1–2	0–1	1–3	0–1	—	0–0	1–0	1–4	1–1	2–3	0–3	2–1	0–1	0–1	2–3	1–0	1–2	0–3	1–3
Kidsgrove Athletic	2–1	3–1	1–3	0–2	3–2	2–0	1–0	1–0	—	1–1	3–4	1–3	3–1	1–3	1–2	1–1	0–1	2–1	4–2	0–1	1–1	2–0
Lower Breck	4–0	0–3	1–1	0–3	1–2	1–1	3–3	1–1	2–2	—	2–1	2–2	2–3	1–0	1–1	3–0	2–0	2–1	2–0	4–0	3–2	6–0
Mossley	3–0	0–1	1–5	2–1	4–1	0–0	3–2	1–0	3–3	0–1	—	1–1	3–2	0–0	1–1	4–0	0–0	0–0	1–1	3–2	0–0	3–3
Nantwich Town	2–3	0–4	3–1	1–4	3–0	3–2	2–0	5–1	3–1	1–4	1–1	—	1–0	0–2	1–0	6–1	6–1	0–0	2–2	3–5	0–4	1–3
Newcastle Town	1–2	0–2	0–2	0–1	1–0	1–1	0–3	2–0	3–1	3–3	0–1	3–0	—	1–2	3–1	2–0	1–1	0–5	1–0	0–1	4–3	0–0
Runcorn Linnets	2–0	2–2	1–1	0–3	1–0	2–0	6–2	4–1	3–0	4–2	0–0	1–1	3–1	—	1–2	4–1	1–0	2–2	2–1	2–2	0–5	2–0
Shifnal Town	1–1	1–3	1–2	0–2	1–2	0–1	3–1	1–1	3–2	1–3	3–1	0–2	1–0	0–4	—	1–3	3–0	1–0	1–0	5–2	3–2	1–2
Sporting Khalsa	3–0	1–2	2–4	2–0	0–1	0–2	3–1	3–2	3–1	3–4	1–2	1–0	1–3	3–1	1–1	—	2–2	2–0	5–0	1–4	2–2	2–3
Stafford Rangers	2–3	0–2	0–0	2–2	1–2	2–1	1–0	3–1	1–3	1–0	0–1	2–1	0–0	2–2	3–2	0–0	—	4–0	3–4	2–4	2–3	2–1
Stalybridge Celtic	1–0	2–1	0–1	2–6	1–0	3–3	3–1	6–0	3–2	2–0	1–0	3–2	3–0	1–0	2–2	1–0	2–1	—	2–0	4–4	1–3	4–1
Trafford	4–1	0–2	1–3	0–1	1–3	3–0	1–1	1–2	4–1	4–0	0–0	0–1	0–1	1–2	2–2	4–1	2–1	4–6	—	1–2	0–0	1–2
Vauxhall Motors	2–2	1–4	0–1	3–3	1–1	4–2	2–1	5–0	2–1	2–3	2–1	0–1	3–1	1–3	1–1	4–0	2–0	1–1	1–0	—	1–1	4–1
Witton Albion	0–3	2–2	1–1	3–0	0–0	1–0	3–2	0–2	1–4	4–3	3–2	4–1	0–1	1–1	2–3	2–1	1–3	1–3	1–1	3–1	—	1–0
Wythenshawe Town	0–3	2–2	1–1	0–1	2–3	0–2	2–2	0–0	1–0	0–2	2–2	0–2	0–1	1–2	0–2	1–1	0–3	0–4	2–1	2–7	2–1	—

Source: NPL official site
Legend: Blue = home team win; Yellow = draw; Red = away team win.

=== Top goalscorers ===
Rank	Player	Club	Goals
1	(England) Kyle Hawley	Avro	24
2	(England) Chay Tilt	Sporting Khalsa	21
2	(England) Sam Burns	Lower Breck	21
3	(England) Alex Panter	Nantwich Town	20
3	(England) Lewis Buckley	Lower Breck	20
6	(England) Freddy Garbutt	Witton Albion	17
6	(Wales) Nick Rushton	Vauxhall Motors	17
6	(England) Ruben Jerome	Stalybridge Celtic	17
9	(England) Alex Cherera	Lower Breck	16
9	(England) Byron Harrison	Nantwich Town	16
9	(Wales) Kai Evans	Bury	16
9	(England) Scott Bakkor	Runcorn Linnets	16

=== Stadia and locations ===
Locations of Northern Premier League 2025–26 Division One West teams
Locations of Northern Premier League 2025–26 Division One West teams in the West Midlands

Team	Location	Stadium	Capacity
Atherton Collieries	Atherton	Alder Street	2,500
Avro	Oldham	Whitebank Stadium	1,500
Bootle	Bootle	New Bucks Park	2,500
Bury	Bury	Gigg Lane	12,500
Chasetown	Burntwood	The Scholars Ground	3,000
Clitheroe	Clitheroe	EcoGiants Stadium	2,000
Congleton Town	Congleton	Cleric Stadium	1,500
Darlaston Town 1874	Walsall	The Paycare Ground	1,000
Kidsgrove Athletic	Kidsgrove	The Autonet Insurance Stadium	2,000
Lower Breck	Liverpool (Anfield)	Anfield Sports and Community Centre	1,000
Mossley	Mossley	Seel Park	4,000
Nantwich Town	Nantwich	The Weaver Stadium	3,500
Newcastle Town	Newcastle-under-Lyme	Lyme Valley Stadium	4,000
Runcorn Linnets	Runcorn	APEC Taxis Stadium	1,600
Shifnal Town	Shifnal	Acoustafoam Stadium	1,500
Sporting Khalsa	Willenhall	Aspray Arena	5,000
Stafford Rangers	Stafford	Marston Road	4,150
Stalybridge Celtic	Stalybridge	Bower Fold	6,500
Trafford	Flixton	Shawe View	2,500
Vauxhall Motors	Ellesmere Port	Rivacre Park	3,300
Witton Albion	Northwich	Wincham Park	4,813
Wythenshawe Town	Wythenshawe	Ericstan Stadium	1,320
