= 2021–22 Scunthorpe United F.C. season =

Scunthorpe United
2021–22 season
- Chairman: Peter Swann
- Manager: Neil Cox (until 1 November); Keith Hill (from 5 November)
- Stadium: The Sands Venue Stadium (from 5 November)
- League Two: 24th (relegated)
- FA Cup: First round
- EFL Cup: First round
- EFL Trophy: Group stage
- Lincolnshire Senior Cup: Winners
Home colours	Away colours

The 2021–22 season was Scunthorpe United's 123rd year in their history and third consecutive season in League Two. Along with the league, the club was also competing in the FA Cup, the EFL Cup, the EFL Trophy and the Lincolnshire Senior Cup. The season covered the period from 1 July 2021 to 30 June 2022.

== Pre-season friendlies ==
The Iron announced they would have friendlies against Barton Town, Farsley Celtic, Burton Albion, Hull City, Lincoln City and AFC Wimbledon as part of the club's pre-season preparations.

10 July 2021 Friendly	Barton Town	1–4	Scunthorpe United	Barton-upon-Humber
15:00 BST	Matthews 88'	Report	Loft 22' (pen.); Beestin 52' (pen.), 75'; Green 82'	Stadium: Easy Buy Stadium

17 July 2021 Friendly	Farsley Celtic	Cancelled	Scunthorpe United	Farsley
15:00 BST				Stadium: The Citadel
Note: Match cancelled as precautionary measure due to suspected COVID-19 case.

20 July 2021 Friendly	Scunthorpe United	2–1	Burton Albion	Scunthorpe
19:30 BST	Taft 16'; Trialist 60'	Report	Smith 20'	Stadium: Sands Venue Stadium

24 July 2021 Friendly	Scunthorpe United	0–1	Hull City	Scunthorpe
15:00 BST		Report	Cannon 85'	Stadium: Sands Venue Stadium

27 July 2021 Friendly	Scunthorpe United	0–2	Lincoln City	Scunthorpe
19:30 BST		Report	McGrandles 3'; Bramall 40'	Stadium: Sands Venue Stadium

31 July 2021 Friendly	AFC Wimbledon	1–2	Scunthorpe United	Wimbledon
15:00 BST	Palmer 4' (pen.)	Report	Bunn 31'; Loft 39'	Stadium: Plough Lane

== Competitions ==
=== League Two ===
==== League table ====
Pos	Team	Pld	W	D	L	GF	GA	GD	Pts	Promotion, qualification or relegation
19	Harrogate Town	46	14	11	21	64	75	−11	53	
20	Carlisle United	46	14	11	21	39	62	−23	53	
21	Stevenage	46	11	14	21	45	68	−23	47	
22	Barrow	46	10	14	22	44	57	−13	44	
23	Oldham Athletic (R)	46	9	11	26	46	75	−29	38	Relegation to National League
24	Scunthorpe United (R)	46	4	14	28	29	90	−61	26	Relegation to National League

Source: EFL Official Website
Rules for classification: 1) Points; 2) Goal difference; 3) Number of goals scored; 4) Head-to-head results; 5) Wins; 6) Away goals; 7) Penalty points (sec 9.5); 8) 12-point sending off offences
(R) Relegated

==== Results summary ====
Overall								Home						Away					
Pld	W	D	L	GF	GA	GD	Pts	W	D	L	GF	GA	GD	W	D	L	GF	GA	GD
46	4	14	28	29	90	−61	26	3	7	13	15	36	−21	1	7	15	14	54	−40

Last updated: 7 May 2022.

==== Results by matchday ====
Matchday	1	2	3	4	5	6	7	8	9	10	11	12	13	14	15	16	17	18	19	20	21	22	23	24	25	26	27	28	29	30	31	32	33	34	35	36	37	38	39	40	41	42	43	44	45	46
Ground	H	A	A	H	H	A	H	A	H	A	A	H	A	H	A	H	A	H	H	A	A	A	H	A	A	H	H	A	H	H	A	H	H	A	A	H	H	A	H	A	H	A	H	A	H	A
Result	L	D	D	D	W	L	L	D	L	L	L	L	D	W	L	D	L	D	D	D	D	W	L	L	L	L	L	L	L	W	L	L	D	L	D	L	L	L	L	L	L	L	D	L	D	L
Position	24	19	19	18	14	19	22	23	23	24	24	24	24	24	24	24	24	24	24	24	24	22	23	23	23	23	23	24	24	24	24	24	24	24	24	24	24	24	24	24	24	24	24	24	24	24

Updated to match(es) played on 7 May 2022. Source: Statto.com
A = Away; H = Home; W = Win; D = Draw; L = Loss

==== Matches ====
Scunthorpe's league fixtures were revealed on 24 June 2021.

7 August 2021 1	Scunthorpe United	1–3	Swindon Town	Scunthorpe
15:00 BST	Loft 48' (pen.)	Report	Payne 57' (pen.); Conroy (yellow card) 59'; Gladwin 68'; Grant (yellow card) 78'; Parsons 88'; Simpson (yellow card) 90+1'	Stadium: Sands Venue Stadium; Attendance: 3,602; Referee: Sam Purkiss

14 August 2021 2	Rochdale	0–0	Scunthorpe United	Spotland
15:00 BST		Report		Stadium: Crown Oil Arena; Attendance: 2,679; Referee: Martin Coy

17 August 2021 3	Walsall	1–1	Scunthorpe United	Bescot
19:45 BST	White (yellow card) 33'; Phillips 47'	Report	Pugh (yellow card) 79'; Beestin 90', (yellow card) 90+1'	Stadium: Banks's Stadium; Attendance: 4,009; Referee: Craig Hicks

21 August 2021 4	Scunthorpe United	1–1	Sutton United	Scunthorpe
15:00 BST	Thompson (yellow card) 32'; Scrimshaw 51', (yellow card) 77'; Perry (yellow card) 71'	Report	Wilson 84'; Bugiel (yellow card) 90'	Stadium: Sands Venue Stadium; Attendance: 2,429; Referee: Ross Joyce

28 August 2021 5	Scunthorpe United	1–0	Tranmere Rovers	Scunthorpe
15:00 BST	Hippolyte 4' (pen.), (yellow card) 5'; Pugh (yellow card) 17'	Report	Merrie (yellow card) 58'; Knight-Percival (yellow card) 78'	Stadium: Sands Venue Stadium; Referee: Trevor Kettle

4 September 2021 6	Northampton Town	2–0	Scunthorpe United	Sixfields
15:00 BST	Horsfall (yellow card) 44'; Rose 64'; Hoskins 90+3'	Report	Thompson (yellow card) 9'; Onariase (red card) 20'; Davis (yellow card) 90+5'	Stadium: PTS Academy Stadium; Attendance: 4,870; Referee: Tom Reeves

11 September 2021 7	Scunthorpe United	0–4	Exeter City	Scunthorpe
15:00 BST	Wood (yellow card) 45+2'	Report	Jay 41', 46'; Kite (yellow card) 49'; Key 57'; Dieng 75'	Stadium: Sands Venue Stadium; Attendance: 2,443; Referee: Carl Brook

18 September 2021 8	Carlisle United	2–2	Scunthorpe United	Carlisle
15:00 BST	Gibson 81'; Dickenson 90+5'	Report	Jarvis 3'; Onariase 44'; Perry (yellow card) 66'; Hippolyte (yellow card) 78'; Rowe (yellow card) 86'	Stadium: Brunton Park; Attendance: 4,499; Referee: Rebecca Welch

25 September 2021 9	Scunthorpe United	0–1	Port Vale	Scunthorpe
15:00 BST	Onariase (yellow card) 34'	Report	Garrity 44'; Jones (yellow card) 57'	Stadium: Sands Venue Stadium; Attendance: 2,513; Referee: Sam Barrott

2 October 2021 10	Newport County	3–0	Scunthorpe United	Newport
15:00 BST	Cooper 6'; Baker-Richardson 69'; Telford 84'	Report	Hackney (yellow card) 48'	Stadium: Rodney Parade; Attendance: 3,213; Referee: Steve Martin

9 October 2021 11	Harrogate Town	6–1	Scunthorpe United	Harrogate
15:00 BST	Muldoon 8', 45+2'; Pattison 14', 30'; Diamond 16'; Orsi-Dadomo 83' (pen.)	Report	Beestin (yellow card) 19'; Thompson (yellow card) 69' (yellow-red card) 81'; Davis 79'	Stadium: EnviroVent Stadium; Attendance: 3,180; Referee: Thomas Bramall

16 October 2021 12	Scunthorpe United	0–2	Forest Green Rovers	Scunthorpe
15:00 BST	Davis (yellow card) 31'; Scrimshaw (yellow card) 58'; Rowe (yellow card) 59'; Jarvis (yellow card) 90+1'; Pugh (yellow card) 90+9'	Report	Young (yellow card) 47'; Adams (yellow card) 54', (goal) 65'; Matt 60' (pen.), (yellow card) 82'; Moore-Taylor (yellow card) 90+1'; Cargill (yellow card) 90+10'	Stadium: Sands Venue Stadium; Attendance: 2,140; Referee: Declan Bourne

19 October 2021 13	Barrow	1–1	Scunthorpe United	Barrow-in-Furness
19:45 GMT	Banks (penalty missed) 74'; Brough (yellow card) 78'; Gotts 80'	Report	Loft (penalty missed) 3', (yellow card) 90+4'; Hackney (yellow card) 21'; Taft 42'; Millen (yellow card) 50'	Stadium: The Dune Hotel Stadium; Attendance: 2,739; Referee: Ben Toner

24 October 2021 14	Scunthorpe United	2–1	Crawley Town	Scunthorpe
15:00 BST	Francomb 32' (o.g.); Scrimshaw 55'; Watson (yellow card) 77'	Report	Lynch (yellow card) 65'; Appiah 73'	Stadium: Sands Venue Stadium; Attendance: 2,112; Referee: Peter Wright

30 October 2021 15	Colchester United	2–1	Scunthorpe United	Colchester
15:00 BST	Sears 5'; Dobra 14'; Chambers (yellow card) 33'; Sarpong-Wiredu (yellow card) 41'	Report	Hippolyte (yellow card) 42'; Thompson (yellow card) 77'; Davis 82'; Hackney (yellow card) 90+3'	Stadium: JobServe Community Stadium; Attendance: 2,433; Referee: Gavin Ward

13 November 2021 16	Scunthorpe United	1–1	Salford City	Scunthorpe
15:00 GMT	Loft (yellow card) 32', (goal) 37'; Kenyon (yellow card) 45+2'; Perry (yellow card) 47'	Report	Lowe (yellow card) 45+2'; N'Mai (yellow card) 56'; McAleny 59'; Thomas-Asante (yellow card) 62'	Stadium: Sands Venue Stadium; Attendance: 2,614; Referee: Josh Smith

20 November 2021 17	Mansfield Town	3–1	Scunthorpe United	Mansfield
15:00 GMT	Clarke 28', 60'; Bowery 45+1'	Report	Hippolyte 15' (pen.); Pugh (yellow card) 90+2'	Stadium: One Call Stadium; Attendance: 4,904; Referee: Ben Speedie

23 November 2021 18	Scunthorpe United	1–1	Leyton Orient	Scunthorpe
19:45 GMT	Millen (yellow card) 42'; Scrimshaw 64'; Thompson (yellow card) 78'; Pugh (yellow card) 83'; Perry (yellow card) 85'	Report	Drinan 21'; Mitchell (yellow card) 90+1'	Stadium: Sands Venue Stadium; Attendance: 2,067; Referee: Sam Barrott

27 November 2021 19	Scunthorpe United	1–1	Bradford City	Scunthorpe
15:00 GMT	Jarvis 39'; Onariase (yellow card) 59'; Hackney (yellow card) 65'; Rowe (yellow card) 90+3'	Report	Songo'o 67'	Stadium: Sands Venue Stadium; Attendance: 3,823; Referee: Chris Sarginson

7 December 2021 20	Stevenage	1–1	Scunthorpe United	Stevenage
19:45 GMT	Norris 6'; Prosser (yellow card) 44'	Report	Hippolyte 14'; Rowe (yellow card) 39'; Pugh (yellow card) 83'	Stadium: Lamex Stadium; Attendance: 1,808; Referee: Brett Huxtable

11 December 2021 21	Hartlepool United	0–0	Scunthorpe United	Hartlepool
15:00 GMT		Report	Loft (yellow card) 28'	Stadium: The Suit Direct Stadium; Attendance: 4,809; Referee: Robert Lewis

27 December 2021 22	Oldham Athletic	1–3	Scunthorpe United	Oldham
15:00 GMT	Couto 12'	Report	Hackney (yellow card) 8'; Loft 51', 77'; Pugh (yellow card) 57'; Hippolyte 74'	Stadium: Boundary Park; Attendance: 4,693; Referee: Seb Stockbridge

1 January 2022 23	Scunthorpe United	0–1	Carlisle United	Scunthorpe
15:00 GMT	Rowe (yellow card) 35'; Hackney (yellow card) 52'	Report	McDonald 40'; Dickenson (yellow card) 59'	Stadium: Sands Venue Stadium; Attendance: 3,020; Referee: Ben Toner

8 January 2022 24	Tranmere Rovers	4–0	Scunthorpe United	Birkenhead
15:00 GMT	Jolley 23'; Nevitt 31'; O'Connor (yellow card) 65'; Foley 75'; Watson 89'	Report	Taft (yellow card) 29'	Stadium: Prenton Park; Attendance: 6,056; Referee: Christopher Pollard

15 January 2022 25	Exeter City	2–0	Scunthorpe United	Exeter
15:00 GMT	Brown 63'; Zanzala 76'	Report	Rowe (yellow card) 31'; Hackney (yellow card) 58'	Stadium: St James Park; Attendance: 4,676; Referee: Craig Hicks

22 January 2022 26	Scunthorpe United	0–1	Newport County	Scunthorpe
15:00 GMT	Taft (yellow card) 6'; Hippolyte (yellow card) 45+1', (penalty missed) 71'; O'Malley (yellow card) 81'	Report	Telford (yellow card) 19'; Demetriou (penalty missed) 36'; Baker-Richardson 56'	Stadium: Sands Venue Stadium; Attendance: 2,604; Referee: Sam Purkiss

25 January 2022 27	Scunthorpe United	2–3	Bristol Rovers	Scunthorpe
19:45 GMT	Wood (yellow card) 1'; Burns 89', 90+3'	Report	Grant (yellow card) 32', (goal) 36'; Evans 62' (pen.); Clarke 78'	Stadium: Sands Venue Stadium; Attendance: 2,403; Referee: Anthony Backhouse

29 January 2022 28	Port Vale	1–0	Scunthorpe United	Burslem
15:00 GMT	Harratt (yellow card) 29'; Smith 72'; Edmondson (yellow card) 86'	Report		Stadium: Vale Park; Attendance: 5,467; Referee: Marc Edwards

5 February 2022 29	Scunthorpe United	0–1	Oldham Athletic	Scunthorpe
15:00 GMT	Lewis (yellow card) 45+4'; Beestin (yellow card) 49'; Grant (yellow card) 73'; Pugh (yellow card) 79'	Report	Hart (yellow card) 32'; Luamba 83', (yellow card) 90'; Adams (yellow card) 90'	Stadium: Sands Venue Stadium; Attendance: 5,014; Referee: Neil Hair

8 February 2022 30	Scunthorpe United	1–0	Walsall	Scunthorpe
19:45 GMT	Pugh (yellow card) 29' (yellow-red card) 53'; Rowe 34'	Report	Labadie (yellow card) 81'	Stadium: Sands Venue Stadium; Attendance: 2,123; Referee: Tom Nield

12 February 2022 31	Swindon Town	3–0	Scunthorpe United	Swindon
15:00 GMT	Gladwin (yellow card) 32'; McKirdy 58'; Davison 70', 85' (pen.)	Report	Millen (yellow card) 56'; Rowe (yellow card) 90+4'	Stadium: The Energy Check County Ground; Attendance: 9,012; Referee: Will Finnie

19 February 2022 32	Scunthorpe United	1–2	Rochdale	Scunthorpe
15:00 GMT	Onariase 13'; Rowe (yellow card) 17'; Hackney (yellow card) 28'; Grant (yellow card) 90'	Report	O'Connell (yellow card) 38'; Kelly 51'; Taylor 83'; Broadbent (yellow card) 90+5'	Stadium: Sands Venue Stadium; Referee: Bobby Madley

22 February 2022 33	Scunthorpe United	0–0	Northampton Town	Scunthorpe
19:45 GMT	Grant (yellow card) 59'; Nuttall (yellow card) 78'	Report	Magloire (yellow card) 45'; Guthrie (yellow card) 46'; Koiki (yellow card) 62'; Hoskins (yellow card) 82'; Eppiah (yellow card) 90'	Stadium: Sands Venue Stadium; Attendance: 2,355; Referee: Darren Handley

26 February 2022 34	Sutton United	4–1	Scunthorpe United	Sutton
15:00 GMT	Milson 29' (pen.); Randall 30', 62'; Kizzi 39'	Report	Nuttall (yellow card) 8'; Beautyman 79' (o.g.)	Stadium: VBS Community Stadium; Attendance: 2,870; Referee: Simon Mather

5 March 2022 35	Crawley Town	0–0	Scunthorpe United	Crawley
15:00 GMT	Francomb (yellow card) 69'	Report	Hackney (yellow card) 90+3'	Stadium: The People's Pension Stadium; Attendance: 2,144; Referee: James Bell

12 March 2022 36	Scunthorpe United	1–3	Colchester United	Scunthorpe
15:00 GMT	Nuttall 11', (yellow card) 54'; Matheson (yellow card) 27' (yellow-red card) 35'	Report	Chilvers 60', (yellow card) 72', (goal) 76'; Edwards 67'	Stadium: Sands Venue Stadium; Attendance: 2,427; Referee: Alan Young

15 March 2022 37	Scunthorpe United	0–1	Barrow	Scunthorpe
19:45 GMT	Grant (red card) 22'; Watson (yellow card) 89'	Report	Rooney 44'; Beadling (yellow card) 75' (yellow-red card) 90'; Brough (yellow card) 84'	Stadium: Sands Venue Stadium; Attendance: 2,009; Referee: Tom Reeves

19 March 2022 38	Salford City	5–1	Scunthorpe United	Salford
15:00 GMT	Smith 17'; Thomas-Asante 45+1', 67', (yellow card) 68', (goal) 81'; Kelly 77'	Report	Nuttall 61'; Feeney (yellow card) 80'	Stadium: Peninsula Stadium; Attendance: 1,972; Referee: Peter Wright

26 March 2022 39	Scunthorpe United	0–3	Harrogate Town	Scunthorpe
15:00 GMT	Hackney (yellow card) 65'	Report	Smith 22', 81'; Pattison (yellow card) 36'; Diamond 62'	Stadium: Sands Venue Stadium; Attendance: 2,317; Referee: Tony Harrington

2 April 2022 40	Forest Green Rovers	1–0	Scunthorpe United	Nailsworth
15:00 BST	Stevenson (yellow card) 67'; Sweeney 75'	Report	Hackney (yellow card) 24'; Rowe (yellow card) 53'	Stadium: The New Lawn; Attendance: 2,484; Referee: Sam Allison

9 April 2022 41	Scunthorpe United	0–4	Mansfield Town	Scunthorpe
15:00 BST	Feeney (yellow card) 10'; Delaney (yellow card) 45'	Report	Grant 16' (o.g.); McLaughlin 32'; Stirk 38'; Quinn 46'; Akins (yellow card) 65'	Stadium: Sands Venue Stadium; Attendance: 4,015; Referee: John Busby

15 April 2022 42	Leyton Orient	3–0	Scunthorpe United	Leyton
15:00 BST	Smyth 15'; Archibald 24'; Thompson (yellow card) 27'; Sotiriou 30'; Beckles (yellow card) 53'	Report	Hackney (yellow card) 42'	Stadium: Breyer Group Stadium; Attendance: 5,342; Referee: Declan Bourne

18 April 2022 43	Scunthorpe United	1–1	Stevenage	Scunthorpe
15:00 BST	Rowe (yellow card) 12'; Delaney (yellow card) 47'; Bunn 75'	Report	Reid 53'	Stadium: Sands Venue Stadium; Attendance: 2,439; Referee: Seb Stockbridge

23 April 2022 44	Bradford City	2–1	Scunthorpe United	Bradford
15:00 BST	Walker 1'; Vernam 5'	Report	Rowe (yellow card) 9'; Bass 33' (o.g.)	Stadium: Utilita Energy Stadium; Attendance: 15,248; Referee: Ross Joyce

30 April 2022 45	Scunthorpe United	1–1	Hartlepool United	Scunthorpe
15:00 BST	Nuttall (yellow card) 22'; O'Malley (yellow card) 31'; Wilson 49'	Report	Hull (yellow card) 30'; Featherstone 72' (pen.); Morris (yellow card) 90+1'	Stadium: Sands Venue Stadium; Attendance: 4,210; Referee: Will Finnie

7 May 2022 46	Bristol Rovers	7–0	Scunthorpe United	Horfield
15:00 BST	Lobley 18' (o.g.); Taylor 22'; Collins 53', 79'; Evans 61', 76'; Anderson 85'	Report	Delaney (yellow card) 45+1'; Shrimpton (yellow card) 51'; Beestin (yellow card) 69'; Nuttall (yellow card) 71'	Stadium: Memorial Stadium; Referee: Charles Breakspear

=== FA Cup ===
Scunthorpe were drawn at home to Doncaster Rovers in the first round.

6 November 2021 First round	Scunthorpe United	0–1	Doncaster Rovers	Scunthorpe
13:00 GMT		Report	Loft 38' (o.g.); Dahlberg (yellow card) 66'	Stadium: Sands Venue Stadium; Attendance: 3,301; Referee: Carl Boyeson

=== EFL Cup ===
United were drawn away to Barrow in the first round.

10 August 2021 First round	Barrow	1–0	Scunthorpe United	Barrow-in-Furness
19:45 BST	Sea 50'	Report		Stadium: Progression Solicitors Stadium; Attendance: 1,320; Referee: Oliver Langford

=== EFL Trophy ===
Iron were drawn into Northern Group E alongside Doncaster Rovers, Manchester City U21s and Rotherham United. On July 9, the matches for the group stages was finalised.

Pos	Div	Team	Pld	W	PW	PL	L	GF	GA	GD	Pts	Qualification
1	L1	Rotherham United	3	3	0	0	0	15	1	+14	9	Advance to Round 2
2	L1	Doncaster Rovers	3	2	0	0	1	5	9	−4	6	Advance to Round 2
3	ACA	Manchester City U21	3	1	0	0	2	4	7	−3	3	
4	L2	Scunthorpe United	3	0	0	0	3	3	10	−7	0	

Source: EFL.com

24 August 2021 Group game 1	Scunthorpe United	0–3	Manchester City U21	Scunthorpe
19:00 BST		Report	Palmer 6'; Bolton 24'; Robinson (yellow card) 61'; Mcatee 84'	Stadium: Sands Venue Stadium; Attendance: 860; Referee: Andy Haines

5 October 2021 Group game 2	Rotherham United	4–1	Scunthorpe United	Rotherham
19:00 BST	Grigg 8'; Ladapo 20'; Odoffin (yellow card) 54', (goal) 82'; Smith 90+1'	Report	Wood (yellow card) 30'; Millen (yellow card) 45+4'; Loft 65'	Stadium: AESSEAL New York Stadium; Attendance: 1,439; Referee: Andrew Kitchen

9 November 2021 Group game 3	Scunthorpe United	2–3	Doncaster Rovers	Scunthorpe
19:00 GMT	Loft 88'; Scrimshaw 90'	Report	Vilca 5'; Dodoo 16', 58'	Stadium: Sands Venue Stadium; Attendance: 1,011; Referee: Thomas Bramall

== Transfers ==
=== Transfers in ===
Date	Position	Nationality	Name	From	Fee	Ref.
1 July 2021	CB	(England)	Harry Davis	(England) Morecambe	Free transfer	
1 July 2021	DM	(England)	Alex Kenyon	(England) Morecambe	Free transfer	
6 July 2021	RB	(Scotland)	Ross Millen	(Scotland) Kilmarnock	Free transfer	
16 July 2021	LB	(Northern Ireland)	Lewis Thompson	(England) Blackburn Rovers	Free transfer	
23 July 2021	LW	(England)	Harry Bunn	(England) York City	Free transfer	
23 July 2021	CF	(England)	Tyrone O'Neill	(England) Middlesbrough	Free transfer	
27 July 2021	DM	(England)	Alex Perry	(England) Wigan Athletic	Free transfer	
26 January 2022	RW	(England)	Liam Feeney	(England) Tranmere Rovers	Free transfer	
29 January 2022	CM	(Jamaica)	Anthony Grant	(England) Swindon Town	Free transfer	
31 January 2022	CF	(England)	Joe Nuttall	(England) Blackpool	Undisclosed	

=== Loans in ===
Date from	Position	Nationality	Name	From	Date until	Ref.
26 July 2021	GK	(England)	Tom Billson	(England) Coventry City	11 January 2022 (Note: On 11 January, Billson was recalled by his parent club, Coventry.)	
20 August 2021	CF	(England)	Jake Scrimshaw	(England) Bournemouth	End of season	
31 August 2021	CM	(England)	Hayden Hackney	(England) Middlesbrough	End of season	(Note: On 4 January 2022, Hayden's loan from Middlesbrough was extended until the end of the season.)
31 August 2021	MF	(England)	Harry Wood	(England) Hull City	End of season	
20 November 2021	GK	(Republic of Ireland)	Kieran O'Hara	(England) Burton Albion	27 November 2021	
4 January 2022	CF	(England)	Sam Burns	(England) Blackburn Rovers	End of season	
15 January 2022	RB	(England)	Luke Matheson	(England) Wolverhampton Wanderers	End of season	
24 January 2022	LM	(England)	Tyrese Sinclair	(England) Mansfield Town	End of season	
31 January 2022	CB	(Republic of Ireland)	Ryan Delaney	(England) Morecambe	End of season	
31 January 2022	CF	(England)	Rekeil Pyke	(England) Shrewsbury Town	End of season	

=== Loans out ===
Date from	Position	Nationality	Name	To	Date until	Ref.
7 September 2021	CM	(England)	Finley Shrimpton	(England) Grantham Town	January 2022	
10 September 2021	CF	(England)	Harry Jessop	(England) Gainsborough Trinity	November 2021 (Note: Harry Jessop's loan at Gainsborough Trinity was extended by a further month on 12 October.)	
11 September 2021	CF	(Germany)	Kenan Dünnwald-Turan	(England) Stockport County	11 October 2021	
29 December 2021	RB	(England)	Harry Baker	(England) Pickering Town	February 2022	
1 January 2022	CF	(England)	Tyrone O'Neill	(England) Darlington	End of season	
6 January 2022	AM	(England)	Cameron Wilson	(England) Scarborough Athletic	13 April 2022	
8 March 2022	CF	(England)	Harry Jessop	(England) Farsley Celtic	End of season	
10 March 2022	CM	(England)	Finley Shrimpton	(England) Cleethorpes Town	8 April 2022	

=== Transfers out ===
Date	Position	Nationality	Name	To	Fee	Ref.
18 June 2021	FW	(England)	Joey Dawson	(Scotland) Celtic	Compensation	
30 June 2021	CB	(England)	Charlie Barks	(England) Frickley Athletic	Released	
30 June 2021	CB	(England)	Jacob Bedeau	(England) Burnley	Released	
30 June 2021	LB	(England)	Junior Brown	(England) Bristol Rovers	Released	
30 June 2021	LB	(England)	Lewis Butroid	(England) Gainsborough Trinity	Released	
30 June 2021	RB	(England)	Jordan Clarke	(England) Oldham Athletic	Released	
30 June 2021	LW	(England)	Andy Dales	(England) Mickleover Sports	Released	
30 June 2021	LW	(England)	Abo Eisa	(England) Bradford City	Released	
30 June 2021	RW	(England)	Alex Gilliead	(England) Bradford City	Released	
30 June 2021	RB	(England)	George Hornshaw	(England) Gainsborough Trinity	Released	
30 June 2021	GK	(England)	Mark Howard	(England) Carlisle United	Released	
30 June 2021	CM	(Turkey)	Jem Karacan		Released	
30 June 2021	GK	(England)	Adam Kelsey	(England) Pickering Town	Released	
30 June 2021	SS	(England)	John McAtee	(England) Grimsby Town	Compensation	
30 June 2021	CB	(England)	Harrison McGahey	(England) Oldham Athletic	Released	
30 June 2021	CF	(England)	Kelsey Mooney	(England) Leamington	Released	
30 June 2021	CF	(England)	Olufela Olomola	(England) Hartlepool United	Released	
30 June 2021	CM	(England)	Raynner Silva		Released	
30 June 2021	CF	(Netherlands)	Kevin van Veen	(Scotland) Motherwell	Released	
13 July 2021	CM	(Scotland)	Lewis Spence	(Scotland) Hamilton Academical	Undisclosed	
18 September 2021	CF	(England)	Patrick Virgo	(England) Canvey Island	Free transfer	
4 January 2022	CF	(England)	Ryan Loft	(England) Bristol Rovers	Undisclosed	
28 January 2022	CB	(England)	Harry Davis	(England) AFC Fylde	Free transfer	
28 January 2022	DM	(England)	Alex Kenyon	Free agent	Mutual consent	
31 January 2022	RW	(England)	Devarn Green	Free agent	Mutual consent	
31 January 2022	LW	(England)	Myles Hippolyte	(England) Stockport County	Undisclosed	
