= Cameron Wilson =

Cameron Wilson may refer to:

- Cameron Wilson (footballer) (born 2002), English footballer
- Cameron Wilson (golfer) (born 1992), American golfer
- T. P. Cameron Wilson, English poet and novelist
