= Kyle Hawley =

English footballer

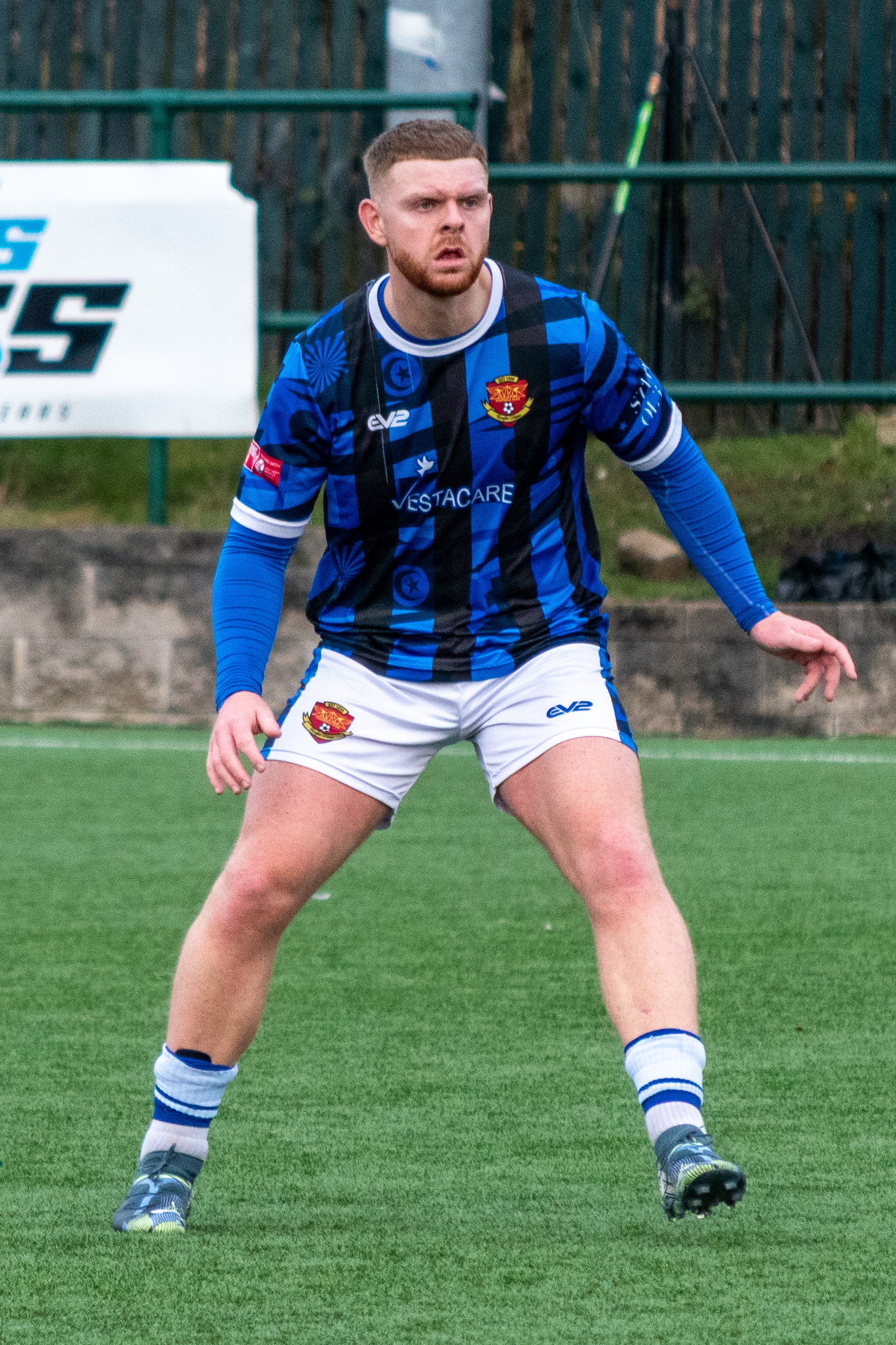
- Hawley playing for Avro in 2026

Personal information
- Full name: Kyle Lee Hawley
- Date of birth: 11 May 2000 (age 26)
- Position: Forward

Team information
- Current team: Avro

Youth career
- Morecambe

Senior career*
Years	Team	Apps	(Gls)
2017–2020	Morecambe	1	(0)
2018	→ Skelmersdale United (loan)		
2019	→ Witton Albion (loan)		
2019	→ Lancaster City (loan)		
2020	→ FC United of Manchester (loan)	4	(1)
2020	Stalybridge Celtic	2	(0)
2020	Glossop North End	8	(0)
2021	→ Mossley (loan)	1	(0)
2021–2023	New Mills		
2023–	Avro		
- * Club domestic league appearances and goals as of 21:15, 22 January 2023 (UTC)

Kyle Lee Hawley (born 11 May 2000) is an English professional footballer who plays as a forward for Avro. He played one match in EFL League Two for his first senior club Morecambe.

== Career ==
Hawley graduated through the Morecambe Academy to make his first-team debut on 1 April 2017, coming on as an 86th-minute substitute for Aaron McGowan in a 3–1 defeat at Cheltenham Town.

A one-year contract option was exercised by Morecambe at the end of the 2018–19 season.

He has undertaken a number of loan spells with non-league clubs - in August 2018 he joined Skelmersdale United, the following August he joined Witton Albion before in October joining Lancaster City and in January 2020 followed this with a spell at FC United of Manchester. At the end of the season he was released by Morecambe following the end of his contract.

In June 2020 he joined Stalybridge Celtic before moving to Glossop North End in September. He recalled to the club in October during the loan spell. before leaving the club in December 2020. He subsequently returned to Glossop North End.

In August 2021 he joined Mossley having played for the club in a number of pre-season friendlies. He later played for New Mills before joining Avro in 2023.

== Career statistics ==
As of match played 1 January 2018

Appearances and goals by club, season and competition
Club	Season	League			FA Cup		League Cup		Other		Total	
Club	Season	Division	Apps	Goals	Apps	Goals	Apps	Goals	Apps	Goals	Apps	Goals
Morecambe	2016–17	League Two	1	0	0	0	0	0	0	0	1	0
Morecambe	2017–18	League Two	0	0	0	0	0	0	0	0	0	0
Career total			1	0	0	0	0	0	0	0	1	0
