= Jai Rowe =

English footballer

Personal information
- Full name: Jai Tyler Rowe
- Date of birth: 8 August 2001 (age 25)
- Place of birth: Nuneaton, England
- Height: 5 ft 11 in (1.81 m)
- Position: Defender

Team information
- Current team: Raith Rovers
- Number: 2

Youth career
- –2017: Nuneaton Griff
- 2017–2018: Nuneaton Borough
- 2017–2018: → Nuneaton Griff (loan)

Senior career*
Years	Team	Apps	(Gls)
2018–2019	Barwell	27	(3)
2019–2023	Scunthorpe United	84	(4)
2023	Aldershot Town	4	(0)
2023–2025	Boston United	92	(15)
2025–	Raith Rovers	27	(1)
- * Club domestic league appearances and goals as of 4 May 2026

Jai Tyler Rowe (born 8 August 2001) is an English professional footballer who plays as a defender for Scottish Championship club Raith Rovers.

== Career ==
Jai made his League Two debut for Scunthorpe United on 3 March 2020 in an away fixture against Swindon Town. Jai started the game, but was substituted on the 73rd minute for Yasin Ben El-Mhanni. Following relegation to the National League at the end of the 2021–22 season, Rowe signed a new two-year contract. On 23 March 2023, he left Scunthorpe United by mutual consent.

Following his departure from Scunthorpe United, Rowe signed for Aldershot Town on a short-term deal until the end of the season. He was released at the end of this deal.

On 6 October 2023, he signed for National League North club Boston United.

On 7 June 2025, Rowe joined Scottish Championship club Raith Rovers on a two-year deal.

== Career statistics ==
As of end of 2022–23 season

Appearances and goals by club, season and competition
Club	Season	League			FA Cup		EFL Cup		Other		Total	
Club	Season	Division	Apps	Goals	Apps	Goals	Apps	Goals	Apps	Goals	Apps	Goals
Barwell	2018–19	Southern League Premier Division Central	27	3	0	0	—		0	0	27	3
Scunthorpe United	2019–20	League Two	1	0	0	0	0	0	0	0	1	0
Scunthorpe United	2020–21	League Two	25	1	0	0	0	0	2 (Note: Appearance(s) in EFL Trophy)	0	27	1
Scunthorpe United	2021–22	League Two	38	1	1	0	0	0	2	0	41	1
Scunthorpe United	2022–23	National League	20	2	1	0	—		1 (Note: Appearance(s) in FA Trophy)	0	22	2
Scunthorpe United	Total		84	4	3	0	0	0	5	0	92	4
Aldershot Town	2022–23	National League	4	0	—		—		0	0	4	0
Career total			115	7	2	0	0	0	5	0	122	7

== Honours ==
Boston United

- National League North play-offs: 2024

Raith Rovers

- Scottish Challenge Cup: 2025–26
