= Jake Scrimshaw =

English footballer (born 2000)

Personal information
- Full name: Jake Scrimshaw
- Date of birth: 13 September 2000 (age 26)
- Place of birth: Isle of Wight, England
- Position: Striker

Team information
- Current team: East Cowes Victoria

Youth career
- 2015–2018: AFC Bournemouth

Senior career*
Years	Team	Apps	(Gls)
2018–2022	AFC Bournemouth	0	(0)
2018–2019	→ Poole Town (loan)	17	(9)
2020	→ Eastleigh (loan)	9	(0)
2020–2021	→ Walsall (loan)	14	(2)
2021	→ Newport County (loan)	16	(3)
2021–2022	→ Scunthorpe United (loan)	17	(3)
2022–2023	Yeovil Town	6	(0)
2023	Eastleigh	7	(1)
2023	AFC Totton	8	(1)
2023–2024	Gosport Borough	14	(3)
2024	Poole Town	15	(1)
2024–2025	Weymouth	2	(1)
2024–2025	→ Bracknell Town (loan)	6	(1)
2025	Downton	4	(1)
2025	AFC Stoneham	2	(0)
2025–	East Cowes Victoria	1	(0)

International career^{‡}
2023	Isle of Wight	5	(7)
- * Club domestic league appearances and goals as of 11:28, 17 October 2025 (UTC) ‡ National team caps and goals as of 21:15, 20 October 2023 (UTC)

Jake Scrimshaw (born 13 September 2000) is an English footballer who plays as a striker for Wessex Football League Premier Division club East Cowes Victoria and the Isle of Wight official team.

== Early life ==
Scrimshaw was born on the Isle of Wight, growing up in Ryde. He attended Ryde Academy.

== Career ==
Scrimshaw began his career at AFC Bournemouth, joining them at the age of 15 following a trial with the club. He spent the 2018–19 season on loan at Poole Town, scoring 17 goals in 23 games in all competitions for the club. Following the loan spell he was praised by the club's manager, and turned professional with Bournemouth in June 2019.

He moved on loan to Eastleigh in January 2020, making 10 appearances in all competitions, and signed a new two-year contract with Bournemouth in July 2020.

He signed on loan for Walsall in October 2020.

On 8 January 2021, Scrimshaw joined Newport County on loan until the end of the season. He made his debut for Newport in the starting lineup for the 0–0 draw against Salford City in League Two on 16 January 2021. Scrimshaw scored his first goal for Newport on 23 January 2021 in the 3-2 League Two defeat against Oldham Athletic.

On 20 August 2021, Scrimshaw again returned to League Two on loan, this time joining Scunthorpe United for the duration of the 2021–22 season.

On 26 August 2022, Scrimshaw joined National League side Yeovil Town, signing a two-year deal. On 6 January 2023, Scrimshaw left Yeovil via mutual consent having played eight times.

On 21 February 2023, Scrimshaw signed for National League side Eastleigh on a short-term deal. He was released at the end of the season. He then signed for AFC Totton in July 2023.

In February 2024, he left Gosport Borough to join Poole Town. He moved to Weymouth in September 2024, scoring on his debut. The next month he moved on loan to Bracknell Town.

In July 2025, Scrimshaw joined Wessex League Premier Division side Downton. In September 2025, featured for divisional rivals AFC Stoneham. The following month, he returned to the Isle of Wight to join East Cowes Victoria.

== International career ==
Scrimshaw represented Isle of Wight at the 2023 Island Games football tournament.

== Personal life ==
He was charged with shoplifting and common assault in February 2024. However the case was discontinued in May 2024 due to lack of evidence.

== Career statistics ==
As of match played 30 November 2024

Appearances and goals by club, season and competition
Club	Season	League			FA Cup		EFL Cup		Other		Total	
Club	Season	Division	Apps	Goals	Apps	Goals	Apps	Goals	Apps	Goals	Apps	Goals
AFC Bournemouth	2018–19	Premier League	0	0	0	0	0	0	—		0	0
AFC Bournemouth	2019–20	Premier League	0	0	0	0	0	0	—		0	0
AFC Bournemouth	2020–21	Championship	0	0	0	0	0	0	—		0	0
AFC Bournemouth	2021–22	Championship	0	0	0	0	0	0	—		0	0
AFC Bournemouth	Total		0	0	0	0	0	0	—		0	0
Poole Town (loan)	2018–19	SL Premier Division South	17	9	0	0	—		6 (Note: Three appearances and one goal in FA Trophy, two appearances and seven goals in Dorset Senior Cup, one appearances in Southern League Premier Division South play-offs)	8	23	17
Eastleigh (loan)	2019–20	National League	9	0	0	0	—		1 (Note: Appearance in FA Trophy)	0	10	0
Walsall (loan)	2020–21	League Two	14	2	1	0	0	0	1 (Note: Appearance(s) in EFL Trophy)	0	16	2
Newport County (loan)	2020–21	League Two	16	3	—		—		—		16	3
Scunthorpe United (loan)	2021–22	League Two	17	3	1	0	0	0	1	1	19	4
Yeovil Town	2022–23	National League	6	0	2	0	—		0	0	8	0
Eastleigh	2022–23	National League	7	1	—		—		0	0	7	1
AFC Totton	2023–24	SL Premier Division South	8	1	1	0	—		1 (Note: Appearance in Hampshire Senior Cup)	0	10	1
Gosport Borough	2023–24	SL Premier Division South	14	3	—		—		1	0	15	3
Poole Town	2023–24	SL Premier Division South	15	1	—		—		—		15	1
Weymouth	2024–25	National League South	2	1	3	0	—		0	0	5	1
Bracknell Town (loan)	2024–25	SL Premier Division South	6	1	—		—		1 (Note: Appearance in Berks & Bucks Senior Cup)	0	7	1
Career total			130	25	8	0	0	0	12	9	150	34
