= Harry Lewis (footballer, born 2004) =

English footballer

Personal information
- Full name: Harry James Lewis
- Date of birth: 9 January 2004 (age 22)
- Place of birth: Scunthorpe, England
- Height: 5 ft 9 in (1.75 m)
- Position: Midfielder

Youth career
- Appleby Frodingham
- 2016–2022: Scunthorpe United

Senior career*
Years	Team	Apps	(Gls)
2022–2023	Scunthorpe United	11	(0)
2022	→ Gainsborough Trinity (loan)	11	(2)
2022–2023	→ Boston United (loan)	4	(0)
2023	→ Gainsborough Trinity (loan)	14	(0)
2023–2024	Cleethorpes Town	17	(3)
- * Club domestic league appearances and goals as of 14:47, 18 January 2024 (UTC)

Harry James Lewis (born 9 January 2004) is an English professional footballer who plays as a midfielder.

== Playing career ==
Born in Scunthorpe, Lewis joined Scunthorpe United at under-13 level from Appleby-Frodingham. He made his debut in the English Football League on 1 January 2022, coming on as a 63rd-minute substitute for Ryan Loft in a 1–0 defeat to Carlisle United at Glanford Park. He signed a two-year professional contract (with the club retaining the option of a further 12-months) with the "Iron" in January 2022, which was due to begin six months later.

On 7 October 2022, Lewis joined Northern Premier League Premier Division club Gainsborough Trinity on an initial one month loan deal. Lewis returned to Scunthorpe on 7 December, joining National League North club Boston United for a month the following day. Upon the expiration of this loan, he returned to Gainsborough Trinity for a further month.

Following his release by Scunthorpe, Lewis signed for non-league side Cleethorpes Town. In January 2024, he departed the club in order to play football in Australia for a season.

== Statistics ==
As of match played 6 January 2024

Appearances and goals by club, season and competition
Club	Season	League			FA Cup		EFL Cup		Other		Total	
Club	Season	Division	Apps	Goals	Apps	Goals	Apps	Goals	Apps	Goals	Apps	Goals
Scunthorpe United	2021–22	EFL League Two	11	0	0	0	0	0	0	0	11	0
Scunthorpe United	2022–23	National League	0	0	0	0	—		0	0	0	0
Scunthorpe United	Total		11	0	0	0	0	0	0	0	11	0
Gainsborough Trinity (loan)	2022–23	Northern Premier League Premier Division	11	2	0	0	—		2 (Note: Appearance(s) in FA Trophy)	0	13	2
Boston United (loan)	2022–23	National League North	4	0	—		—		0	0	4	0
Cleethorpes Town	2023–24	Northern Premier League Division One East	17	3	5	1	—		2 (Note: One appearance in FA Trophy and one appearance in Lincolnshire Senior Cup)	0	24	4
Career total			43	5	5	1	0	0	4	0	52	6
