= Joe Nuttall =

English footballer

Personal information
- Full name: Joseph Andre Nuttall
- Date of birth: 27 January 1997 (age 29)
- Place of birth: Bury, England
- Height: 1.82 m (6 ft 0 in)
- Position: Striker

Team information
- Current team: Morecambe
- Number: 21

Youth career
- 2013–2015: Manchester City

Senior career*
Years	Team	Apps	(Gls)
2015–2017	Aberdeen	2	(0)
2016–2017	→ Stranraer (loan)	9	(2)
2017	→ Dumbarton (loan)	2	(0)
2017–2019	Blackburn Rovers	28	(4)
2019–2022	Blackpool	27	(2)
2020–2021	→ Northampton Town (loan)	1	(0)
2022	Scunthorpe United	36	(11)
2022–2025	Oldham Athletic	35	(8)
2024	→ Cheltenham Town (loan)	16	(2)
2024–2025	→ Altrincham (loan)	26	(4)
2025–	Morecambe	0	(0)

International career^{‡}
2023–	England C	1	(0)
- * Club domestic league appearances and goals as of 13:04, 7 June 2025 (UTC) ‡ National team caps and goals as of 21:55, 21 March 2023 (UTC)

Joseph Andre Nuttall (born 27 January 1997) is an English professional footballer who plays as a striker for Morecambe. He has previously played for Aberdeen, Stranraer, Dumbarton, Blackburn Rovers, Blackpool, Northampton Town, Scunthorpe United and Cheltenham Town.

== Career ==
=== Manchester City ===
Nuttall began his career in the Manchester City academy in 2013.

=== Aberdeen ===
During the summer of 2015, Aberdeen completed the signing of the then-teenage Nuttall on a two-year deal. A product of the City youth academy, he first spent a spell training with the club at the end of the 2014–15 season. He made his debut for the Dons' U-20s against Dundee United on 1 September 2015. He scored his first goal in the Youth Cup win over Fraserburgh at Pittodrie, and later scored against Inverness Caledonian Thistle.

Nuttall made his professional debut for Aberdeen as an 81st-minute substitute in a league match against Heart of Midlothian on 16 May 2016.

==== Loan spells ====
On 10 November 2016, Nuttall moved to Stranraer on a 28-day loan. He scored on his debut for the club in a 3–2 loss to Albion Rovers and then scored again in a 3–1 win against Stenhousemuir. On 6 December 2016, Stranraer extended his loan deal until 18 January. After returning to Aberdeen he joined Dumbarton on 31 March 2017, on an emergency loan until the end of the season. Nuttall's contract expired in May 2017, resulting in his leaving Aberdeen without making any significant impact in the first team.

=== Blackburn Rovers ===
On 11 July, Nuttall joined Blackburn Rovers on trial, and played in a pre-season Rovers development team game against Darwen; he scored a hat-trick in a 5–0 Rovers victory. The next week he scored two goals for the Rovers development team against Ramsbottom United. Nuttall made his senior first-team debut coming on as a substitute in the second half of a pre-season game against Morecambe on 21 July 2017. The next day, Blackburn announced he had signed a 12-month contract with an option for a further 12 months.

In August 2017, Nuttall made his first-team debut as a substitute and scored the only goal for Blackburn in a 2017–18 EFL Trophy victory against Stoke City U-21s.

On 31 October, Nuttall made his league debut coming on in the second half against Fleetwood Town and scored again. He also came off the bench in the FA Cup against Barnet and scored, making it three goals in his first four appearances for Rovers.

==== Premier League 2 ====
After arriving on trial in July, Nuttall went on to contribute 14 goals in 15 appearances and gained two assists. It was after ten goals in seven games midway through October for the development squad that Nuttall was promoted into the first team, before dropping back down into the development squad towards the end of January 2018. On 12 May Nuttall was one of seven players nominated for Premier League 2 Player of the Season. Also on this list were Reiss Nelson, Eddie Nketiah, Lukas Nmecha and Harry Wilson. Also, despite his 13 appearances in the Blackburn first team, Nuttall finished as the Premier League 2's second-top goalscorer with 14 goals, behind Lukas Nmecha's 15 strikes.

==== 2017–18 season ====
In Nuttall's breakthrough season, the striker went on to make 13 appearances for the Blackburn Rovers first-team squad. In that time, Nuttall scored two goals, the first on his debut against Fleetwood in a 2–2 draw and his second coming three weeks later on 21 November in a 4–2 win over Oxford United. He would go on to make ten more appearances and help Blackburn get promoted back to the Championship at the first time of asking. He also scored three more goals in both league and cup competitions.

=== Blackpool ===
On 1 August 2019, Nuttall joined Blackpool for an undisclosed fee. He scored his first goal for Blackpool in an EFL Trophy tie against Morecambe on 3 September 2019 and later scored his first EFL League One goal for Blackpool against Ipswich Town on 23 November 2019. His second was an injury-time winner, also against Ipswich, at Bloomfield Road on 29 February 2020.

==== Northampton Town (loan) ====
Nuttall joined Northampton Town on a season-long loan deal on 31 August 2020, but returned to his parent club in October after making only one substitute appearance against Hull City on account of a knee injury.

=== Scunthorpe United ===
On 31 January 2022, Nuttall joined League Two club Scunthorpe United for an undisclosed fee. Nuttall made his debut for Scunthorpe in the next game, which ended in a 1–0 loss to Oldham Athletic. He would score his first goal for Scunthorpe on 12 March 2022, in a 3–1 loss to Colchester United. Nuttall would score his only other goal of the season in a 5–1 loss to Salford City. Following a 1–1 draw to Hartlepool United, Nuttall missed an opportunity to score and began swearing at the Scunthorpe fans, before being taken off by manager Keith Hill. Nuttall later apologised for his actions on Twitter. Scunthorpe were relegated from League Two, with Nuttall made 16 appearances for Scunthorpe in the 2021–22 season.

Nuttall remained at Scunthorpe for the start of the 2022–23 season. He would go on to score nine goals for Scunthorpe, including braces against Maidenhead United, Solihull Moors and Gateshead. Nuttall rejected an offer to move to Oldham in September and October 2022, but by December, he had made the club aware of his desire to leave. In his final game for Scunthorpe, Nuttall was given a red card for the first time in his professional career after a late tackle on Wealdstone goalkeeper, Sam Howes. In total, Nuttall played 36 league games for Scunthorpe, scoring 11 times.

=== Oldham Athletic ===
On 9 December 2022, Nuttall joined fellow National League side, Oldham Athletic on a three-year deal. Nuttall would make his debut and score for Oldham in a 4–1 loss against Notts County. He would also score in the next game, which was a 2–2 draw to Notts County, though he would only score one goal in his next three games. Oldham manager, David Unsworth, claimed the lack of goals was due to his "unselfish" nature. By the end of the season, Nuttall had played 23 times and scored 7 goals.

On 20 June 2024, Nuttall joined fellow National League side Altrincham on a season-long loan deal.

Nuttall was released by the club at the conclusion of the 2024–25 season.

He subsequently joined Morecambe. On 16 May 2026, Morecambe announced he was being released.

== Career statistics ==
As of match played 16 November 2024

Appearances and goals by club, season and competition
Club	Season	League			Domestic Cup		League Cup		Other		Total	
Club	Season	Division	Apps	Goals	Apps	Goals	Apps	Goals	Apps	Goals	Apps	Goals
Aberdeen	2015–16	Scottish Premiership	2	0	0	0	0	0	0	0	2	0
Aberdeen	2016–17	Scottish Premiership	0	0	0	0	0	0	2 (Note: Appearances in Scottish Challenge Cup with Aberdeen's U20 side.)	1	2	1
Aberdeen	Total		2	0	0	0	0	0	2	1	4	1
Stranraer (loan)	2016–17	Scottish League One	9	2	1	0	0	0	0	0	10	2
Dumbarton (loan)	2016–17	Scottish Championship	2	0	0	0	0	0	0	0	2	0
Blackburn Rovers	2017–18	League One	13	2	3	1	0	0	3 (Note: Appearance(s) in EFL Trophy)	2	19	5
Blackburn Rovers	2018–19	Championship	15	2	1	0	2	1	0	0	18	3
Blackburn Rovers	Total		28	4	4	1	2	1	3	2	37	8
Blackpool	2019–20	League One	27	2	3	0	0	0	3	2	33	4
Blackpool	2020–21	League One	0	0	0	0	0	0	0	0	0	0
Blackpool	2021–22	Championship	0	0	0	0	0	0	0	0	0	0
Blackpool	Total		27	2	3	0	0	0	3	2	33	4
Northampton Town (loan)	2020–21	League One	1	0	0	0	0	0	0	0	1	0
Scunthorpe United	2021–22	League Two	16	2	0	0	0	0	0	0	16	2
Scunthorpe United	2022–23	National League	20	9	1	0	—		0	0	21	9
Scunthorpe United	Total		36	11	1	0	0	0	0	0	37	11
Oldham Athletic	2022–23	National League	23	7	0	0	0	0	1 (Note: Appearance in FA Trophy)	0	24	7
Oldham Athletic	2023–24	National League	12	1	1	0	0	0	0	0	13	1
Oldham Athletic	2024–25	National League	0	0	0	0	0	0	0	0	0	0
Oldham Athletic	Total		35	8	1	0	0	0	1	0	37	8
Cheltenham Town (loan)	2023–24	League One	16	2	0	0	0	0	0	0	16	2
Altrincham (loan)	2024–25	National League	14	1	0	0	0	0	0	0	14	1
Career total			170	30	10	1	2	1	9	5	191	37

== Honours ==
Aberdeen

- Scottish Premiership runner-up: 2015–16

Blackburn Rovers

- EFL League One runner-up: 2017–18
