= Tyrone O'Neill =

English footballer (born 1999)

Personal information
- Full name: Tyrone O'Neill
- Date of birth: 12 October 1999 (age 27)
- Place of birth: Grangetown, England
- Height: 6 ft 1 in (1.86 m)
- Position: Striker

Team information
- Current team: Shildon

Youth career
- Redcar Town
- Marske United
- Stockton Town
- 20??–2018: Middlesbrough

Senior career*
Years	Team	Apps	(Gls)
2018–2021	Middlesbrough	1	(0)
2018–2019	→ Hartlepool United (loan)	3	(0)
2019	→ Darlington (loan)	14	(4)
2020–2021	→ Darlington (loan)	6	(2)
2021–2022	Scunthorpe United	4	(0)
2022	→ Darlington (loan)	13	(4)
2022	Stockton Town	6	(0)
2022–	Shildon	0	(0)
- * Club domestic league appearances and goals as of 20:57, 1 December 2022 (UTC)

Tyrone O'Neill (born 12 October 1999) is an English professional footballer who plays as a striker for Northern League Division One club Shildon. O'Neill made his Football League debut for Middlesbrough in the EFL Championship in 2019, but that was his only first-team appearance. He spent time on loan at National League club Hartlepool United and Darlington before being released in 2021 and joining Scunthorpe United. He returned to Darlington on loan in 2022 before leaving Scunthorpe at the end of the season and signing for Stockton Town.

== Life and career ==
=== Early life and career ===
O'Neill was born in Grangetown, North Yorkshire, in 1999, and attended St Peter's Catholic College in nearby South Bank. He played junior football for Redcar Town, moved on to Marske United under-12s, and then to Stockton Town, scoring freely at under-13 level and helping the under-14s win their division.

=== Middlesbrough ===
O'Neill joined Middlesbrough F.C.'s Academy, and took up a two-year scholarship in 2016. In his first year he played regularly for the under-18s; in his second, he moved into the under-23s and made two appearances in the EFL Trophy. His progress was rewarded with a first professional contract in 2018. First-team manager Tony Pulis gave debuts to several academy products in the EFL Cup first round match against Notts County on 14 August 2018; O'Neill was an unused substitute. After three more EFL Trophy matches, he joined National League club Hartlepool United on 9 November on loan until the end of the year.

He made his first-team debut the following day, coming on for the last 20 minutes as Hartlepool held League One team Gillingham to a goalless draw in the FA Cup. According to manager Matthew Bates, "he brought a robustness" to the side. In the replay, with Gillingham 4–2 ahead in extra time, O'Neill scored his first senior goal when he "got the ball close to goal and held it up, turned and poked in from close range." He played three National League matches before Bates was replaced as manager by Richard Money, who chose to select Hartlepool's own players rather than loanees.

In July 2019, O'Neill joined National League North club Darlington on loan for six months. Their manager, Alun Armstrong, who had coached him at Middlesbrough's academy, would later describe him as lacking pace, but "very skinny, wiry, but he gives as good as he's got, he's quite strong for the size of him. He'll back in, he'll hold the ball up but he's got unbelievable quick feet for such a big lad, he can tie people in knots at times." One of nine debutants on the opening day of the season, O'Neill scored his first Darlington goal nine days later against Curzon Ashton, "adding the final touch to a team goal that involved seven players and ten passes", and his second the following week against Southport. In the FA Cup, he contributed two goals and an assist as Darlington beat Tamworth 3–0 to reach the first round proper. Two weeks later, he was recalled by Middlesbrough, who were without nine first-team players because of injury or suspension. He had made 17 appearances, missing just one match because of a head injury, and scored seven goals.

O'Neill made his Football League debut in the Championship match away to Leeds United on 30 November, replacing the injured Britt Assombalonga for the last quarter-hour of a 4–0 loss. That was his last appearance, and in the new year he was rarely part of the matchday squad. The COVID-19 pandemic put paid to a proposed return to Darlington in March, but Armstrong persisted, and on 20 November 2020, O'Neill rejoined the club on loan until January 2021. On 5 January, the loan was extended until the end of the month. He scored twice in 10 appearances before returning to Middlesbrough, and was released when his contract expired at the end of the season.

=== Scunthorpe United ===
O'Neill trained with Darlington during the close season, but a trial at League Two club Scunthorpe United proved successful and he signed a two-year contract on 23 July 2021. He started the opening match of the season, but lasted only half an hour before a knee injury forced his substitution. He made three more appearances during August and September, but his progress was interrupted by injury, and his last inclusion in a matchday squad came at the end of October.

On 1 January 2022, the first day of the transfer window, he rejoined Darlington on loan for the rest of the 2021–22 season. He marked his debut a week later with a headed goal, the fifth in Darlington's 6–0 win away to Farsley Celtic; it was his first touch of the ball. He finished the season with four goals from 13 National League North appearances. In June 2022, O'Neill left Scunthorpe by mutual consent.

=== Stockton Town ===
O'Neill rejoined Stockton Town, the club for which he played as a young teenager, in August 2022.

=== Shildon ===
On 8 November, O'Neill signed for Shildon.

== Career statistics ==
As of match played 29 October 2022

Appearances and goals by club, season and competition
Club	Season	League			National Cup (Note: Includes FA Cup, Scottish Cup)		League Cup (Note: Includes EFL Cup, Scottish League Cup)		Other		Total	
Club	Season	Division	Apps	Goals	Apps	Goals	Apps	Goals	Apps	Goals	Apps	Goals
Middlesbrough U21	2017–18	—			—		—		2 (Note: Appearances in EFL Trophy)	0	2	0
Middlesbrough U21	2018–19	—			—		—		3	0	3	0
Middlesbrough U21	Total	—			—		—		5	0	5	0
Middlesbrough	2018–19	Championship	0	0	—		0	0	0	0	0	0
Middlesbrough	2019–20	Championship	1	0	0	0	0	0	—		1	0
Middlesbrough	2020–21	Championship	0	0	0	0	0	0	—		0	0
Middlesbrough	Total		1	0	0	0	0	0	0	0	1	0
Hartlepool United (loan)	2018–19	National League	3	0	2	1	—		1 (Note: Appearance(s) in FA Trophy)	0	6	1
Darlington (loan)	2019–20	National League North	14	4	3	3	—		—		17	7
Darlington (loan)	2020–21	National League North	6	2	1	0	—		3	0	10	2
Darlington (loan)	Total		20	6	4	3	0	0	3	0	27	9
Scunthorpe United	2021–22	League Two	4	0	0	0	0	0	0	0	4	0
Darlington (loan)	2021–22	National League North	13	4	—		—		—		13	4
Stockton Town	2022–23	Northern Premier League; East Division	6	0	0	0	—		3 (Note: Two appearances and two goals in FA Trophy, one appearance in Durham Challenge Cup)	2	9	2
Shildon	2022–23	Northern Premier League; East Division	0	0	0	0	—		0	0	0	0
Career total			47	10	6	4	0	0	12	2	65	16
