= Harry Jessop =

English footballer

Personal information
- Full name: Harry Peter Jessop
- Date of birth: 1 August 2002 (age 24)
- Place of birth: Chesterfield, England
- Height: 5 ft 11 in (1.80 m)
- Position: Striker

Team information
- Current team: Pickering Town

Youth career
- –2011: Sheffield Wednesday
- 2011–2020: Scunthorpe United

Senior career*
Years	Team	Apps	(Gls)
2020–2022	Scunthorpe United	5	(0)
2020	→ Pickering Town (loan)	5	(2)
2021	→ Gainsborough Trinity (loan)	9	(1)
2022	Tadcaster Albion		(0)
2022	Pickering Town	15	(11)
2022–2024	Curzon Ashton		
2024–	Pickering Town		
- * Club domestic league appearances and goals

Harry Peter Jessop (born 1 August 2002) is an English professional footballer who plays as a striker for Pickering Town.

== Career ==
Born in Chesterfield, Jessop started his youth career at Sheffield Wednesday before signing for Scunthorpe United as an under-10 in December 2011 following his release by Wednesday. After a two-year scholarship with the club, he was offered his first professional contract in summer 2020.

Jessop joined Northern Premier League Division One North/West side Pickering Town on a one-month loan in October 2020, and scored a late goal on his début for the club in a 2–1 win over Ossett United; then the only goal in a win against Brighouse Town. He was recalled shortly before the end of his loan spell due to the suspension of Northern Premier League fixtures as a result of a second national lockdown in England, having scored 3 goals in 7 starts for the club and was named their Player of the Month for October. He made his senior debut for Scunthorpe United on 13 April 2021 as a 71st-minute substitute in a 4–1 defeat away to Morecambe. He made 3 appearances for Scunthorpe in his debut season in professional football.

After three appearances for Scunthorpe in August 2021, it was announced that Jessop had joined Gainsborough Trinity on a month-long loan on 10 September 2021. He made his debut for the club on 11 September 2021 as a substitute in a 1–0 defeat to Warrington Town.

On 8 March 2022, Jessop joined National League North side Farsley Celtic on loan for the remainder of the 2021–22 season.

Jessop was released by Scunthorpe at the end of the 2021–22 season. At the start of the 2022-23 season he had a brief stint with Tadcaster Albion and then rejoined Pickering Town, now in the Northern Football League. He signed a semi-professional contract with National League North club Curzon Ashton in November 2022.

== Style of play ==
Jessop is left-footed and plays as a striker.

== Career statistics ==
As of match played 19 March 2022

Appearances and goals by club, season and competition
Club	Season	League			FA Cup		EFL Cup		Other		Total	
Club	Season	Division	Apps	Goals	Apps	Goals	Apps	Goals	Apps	Goals	Apps	Goals
Scunthorpe United	2020–21	EFL League Two	3	0	0	0	0	0	0	0	3	0
Scunthorpe United	2021–22	EFL League Two	2	0	0	0	0	0	1 (Note: Appearance(s) in the EFL Trophy)	0	3	0
Scunthorpe United	Total		5	0	0	0	0	0	1	0	6	0
Pickering Town (loan)	2020–21	Northern Premier League Division One North West	5	2	2	1	—		0	0	7	3
Gainsborough Trinity (loan)	2021–22	Northern Premier League Premier Division	9	1	0	0	—		1 (Note: Appearance(s) in the FA Trophy)	0	10	1
Farsley Celtic (loan)	2021–22	National League North	1	0	0	0	—		0	0	1	0
Career total			20	3	2	1	0	0	2	0	24	4
