= Lewis Thompson =

Northern Irish footballer

Personal information
- Date of birth: 10 October 1999 (age 27)
- Height: 6 ft 1 in (1.85 m)
- Position: Defender

Team information
- Current team: Hyde United

Youth career
- Manchester United
- 2016–2018: Blackburn Rovers

Senior career*
Years	Team	Apps	(Gls)
2018–2021	Blackburn Rovers	0	(0)
2018	→ F.C. United of Manchester (loan)	11	(0)
2020	→ AFC Fylde (loan)	2	(0)
2021–2022	Scunthorpe United	14	(0)
2022–2023	Spennymoor Town	1	(0)
2023	→ Ashton United (loan)	10	(2)
2023–2024	Bamber Bridge	16	(0)
2024	→ Atherton Collieries (loan)	15	(2)
2024	Atherton Collieries	1	(0)
2024–	Hyde United	1	(0)

International career^{‡}
- Northern Ireland U21
- * Club domestic league appearances and goals as of 14:55, 3 March 2023 (UTC) ‡ National team caps and goals as of 11:10, 16 July 2021 (UTC)

Lewis Thompson (born 10 October 1999) is a Northern Irish professional footballer who plays as a defender for Hyde United.

== Club career ==
Thompson began his career with Manchester United, moving to Blackburn Rovers in 2016. Whilst with Blackburn he spent loan spells at F.C. United of Manchester in 2018, and AFC Fylde in 2020. He moved to Scunthorpe United in July 2021, signing a one-year contract, having failed to make a competitive appearance for Blackburn.

He was released by Scunthorpe at the end of the 2021–22 season.

On 25 November 2022, Thompson signed for National League North side Spennymoor Town. In March 2023, he joined Northern Premier League Premier Division club Ashton United on loan until the end of the season.

In January 2024, he joined Atherton Collieries on an initial short-term loan. Ahead of the 2024–25 season, he joined the club on a permanent basis, being named club captain.

In September 2024, he joined Hyde United.

== International career ==
He has represented Northern Ireland at under-21 level.
