= Avro F.C. =

Association football club in Greater Manchester, England

Avro
- Full name: Avro Football Club
- Nicknames: The Vulcans, The Ro
- Founded: 1936
- Ground: Whitebank Stadium, Oldham
- Capacity: 1,500
- Chairman: Rob Fuller
- Manager: Lewis Hardcastle and Jack Hindle
- League: Northern Premier League Premier Division
- 2025–26: Northern Premier League Division One West, 2nd of 22 (promoted via play-offs)
- Website: avrofc.co.uk
| Home colours | Away colours |

Avro Football Club is a football club based in the Limeside area of Oldham, Greater Manchester. They are currently members of the Northern Premier League Premier Division and play at the Whitebank Stadium.

== History ==
The club was founded in 1936 at the Failsworth factory of British aircraft manufacturer Avro. They won the Manchester County Cup in 1939–40 and 1940–41, before joining the Manchester League in 1954. The club won the Manchester County Cup again in 1955–56, but finished bottom of the league in 1956–57 and 1957–58. After finishing bottom of Division One in 1963–64, Avro left the league. They rejoined the league in 1987, entering Division One, now the second tier below the Premier Division. The club's first season back in the league saw them win the Manchester County Cup for the fourth time.

Avro were Division One champions in 1988–89, earning promotion to the Premier Division. However, after finishing bottom of the Premier Division in 1991–92, the club were relegated back to Division One. Another Manchester County Cup win followed in 1993–94. They were Division One runners-up in 1994–95, but then left the league. The club returned to Division One in 1998, and were champions in 2003–04, earning promotion back to the Premier Division. In 2006–07 they finished bottom of the division and were relegated to Division One, but the club were Division One runners-up the following season, securing an immediate promotion back to the Premier Division. In 2009–10 they won the Premier Division title for the first time, retaining the title the following season.

After winning the Premier Division for a third time in 2017–18, Avro were promoted to Division One North of the North West Counties League. Their first season in the division saw them finish as runners-up, earning promotion to the Premier Division as one of the second placed clubs with the best points-per-game across the divisions. In 2022–23 they were runners-up in the Premier Division, qualifying for an inter-step play-off. They went on to beat Lincoln United 2–1 to earn promotion to Division One West of the Northern Premier League. The club were runners-up in Division One West in 2025–26, going on to defeat Lower Breck on penalties in the play-off semi-finals, before beating Stalybridge Celtic in the final to secure promotion to the Premier Division.

== Ground ==
The club originally played at the Lancaster Club in Failsworth. However, after Oldham Council announced plans to use the site for housing, the club moved to the Whitebank Stadium in 2017. As part of the move, the ground was redeveloped, with a new artificial pitch and floodlights.

== Honours ==
- Manchester League
  - Premier Division champions 2009–10, 2010–11, 2017–18
  - Division One champions 1988–89, 2003–04
- Manchester County Cup
  - Winners 1939–40, 1940–41, 1955–56, 1987–88, 1993–94, 2008–09, 2010–11, 2011–12, 2014–15, 2017–18

== Records ==
- Best FA Cup performance: First qualifying round, 2022–23, 2025–26
- Best FA Trophy performance: Third round, 2026–27
- Best FA Vase performance: Third round, 2018–19
- Record attendance: 1,320 vs Bury, Northern Premier League Division One West Division, 13 August 2025
