= Cameron Wilson (footballer) =

English footballer

Personal information
- Full name: Cameron Harry Wilson
- Date of birth: 1 December 2002 (age 23)
- Place of birth: Scunthorpe, England
- Positions: Attacking midfielder; right winger

Team information
- Current team: Guiesley AFC

Youth career
- –2013: Goole Town Tigers
- 2013–2021: Scunthorpe United

Senior career*
Years	Team	Apps	(Gls)
2021–2024	Scunthorpe United	65	(7)
2022	→ Scarborough Athletic (loan)	17	(2)
2024	→ Scarborough Athletic (loan)	7	(1)
2024–2025	Scarborough Athletic	23	(0)
2025–	Matlock Town	30	(13)
- * Club domestic league appearances and goals as of 19:49, 28 November 2025 (UTC)

Cameron Harry Wilson (born 1 December 2002) is an English footballer who plays as an attacking midfielder for Northern Premier League Division One East club Matlock Town.

== Career ==
Born in Scunthorpe, Wilson played youth football for Goole Town Tigers before joining Scunthorpe United's under-11 team in 2013. He signed his first professional contract with the club in May 2021; he signed a one-year deal with the option of a further year. He made his debut for the club as a substitute in a 3–1 home defeat to Swindon Town on 7 August 2021.

On 6 January 2022, Wilson joined Northern Premier League Premier Division side Scarborough Athletic on a one-month loan deal. The deal was later extended until the end of the season. Wilson was recalled to Scunthorpe on 13 April 2022, he made 17 league appearances for Scarborough and scored twice. Wilson immediately returned to the Scunthorpe side and made his first league start for the club in a 1–1 draw against Stevenage on 18 April 2022. At the end of the 2021–22 season, Wilson's contract was extended for a further year.

Despite initially turning down a new contract and receiving offers from clubs in higher leagues, Scunthorpe announced that Cameron had agreed to a new contract with the club in June 2023.

In March 2024, for the second time in his career, he moved on loan to Scarborough – now in the National League North – until the end of the season.

He was released by Scunthorpe at the end of the 2023–24 season. On 30 July 2024, Cameron signed for Scarborough on a permanent basis.

In February 2025, Wilson joined Northern Premier League Premier Division side Matlock Town on a deal until the end of the 2025–26 season.

== Style of play ==
Wilson plays predominantly as an attacking midfielder but can also play as a right winger.

== Career statistics ==
As of match played 15 January 2022

Appearances and goals by club, season and competition
Club	Season	League			FA Cup		EFL Cup		Other		Total	
Club	Season	Division	Apps	Goals	Apps	Goals	Apps	Goals	Apps	Goals	Apps	Goals
Scunthorpe United	2021–22	EFL League Two	3	0	0	0	1	0	1 (Note: Appearance(s) in EFL Trophy)	0	5	0
Scarborough Athletic (loan)	2021–22	Northern Premier League Premier Division	4	1	0	0	—		0	0	4	1
Career total			6	1	0	0	1	0	1	0	8	1
