= Huuhtanen =

Huuhtanen is a surname of Finnish origin. Notable people with this surname include:

- Eetu Huuhtanen (born 2003), Finnish footballer
- Jorma Huuhtanen (born 1945), Finnish physician and politician
- Niko Huuhtanen (born 2003), Finnish ice hockey player
- Otto Huuhtanen (born 2000), Finnish footballer
- Väinö Huuhtanen (1896–1951), Finnish farmer and politician

== See also ==
- Huhtanen
