= 2016–17 Newcastle United F.C. season =

Newcastle United
2016–17 season
- Owner: Mike Ashley
- Managing director: Lee Charnley
- Manager: Rafael Benítez
- Stadium: St James' Park
- Championship: 1st (promoted)
- EFL Cup: Fifth round
- FA Cup: Fourth round
- Top goalscorer: League: Dwight Gayle (23); All: Dwight Gayle (23)
Home colours	Away colours	Third colours

The 2016–17 season was Newcastle United's second season in the 21st century to be played in the Championship, following their relegation from the Premier League. This season Newcastle United participated in the EFL Championship, EFL Cup and FA Cup. The season covers the period from 1 July 2016 to 30 June 2017.

On 24 April 2017, Newcastle secured promotion to the Premier League with a 4–1 victory over Preston North End. On 7 May, they clinched the Championship title with a 3–0 win against Barnsley, as Brighton conceded a late equaliser against Aston Villa.

== Club ==
=== Coaching staff ===
The Newcastle United first team coaching staff for the 2016–17 season consists of the following:

Position	Staff
Manager	(Spain) Rafael Benítez
Assistant Coach	(Scotland) Ian Cathro (until 5 December 2016)
First Team Coach	(Spain) Mikel Antía
First Team Coach	(Spain) Antonio Gómez Pérez
Fitness Coach	(Spain) Francisco de Míguel Moreno
Strength and Conditioning Coach	(England) Chris Wilding
Goalkeeping Coach	(England) Simon Smith
Head of Sports Science & Medicine	(England) Paul Catterson
Rehabilitation Fitness Coach	(Spain) Cristian Fernández Martínez
Head of Physiotherapy	(England) Derek Wright
Physiotherapist	(Spain) Daniel Martí
Physiotherapist	(England) Michael Harding
Physiotherapist	(England) Carl Nelson
Chief Scout	(England) Graham Carr
Head of Analysis	(England) Kerry Morrow

Last updated: 29 June 2016

== Players ==
=== First team squad ===
Squad No.	Name	Nationality	Position(s)	Date of birth (age)	Signed	Signed from	Signing fee
Goalkeepers
21	Rob Elliot	(Republic of Ireland)	GK	30 April 1986 (aged 31)	2011	(England) Charlton Athletic	£300k
26	Karl Darlow	(England)	GK	8 October 1990 (aged 26)	2014	(England) Nottingham Forest	£3m
28	Matz Sels	(Belgium)	GK	26 February 1992 (aged 25)	2016	(Belgium) Gent	£4.5m
Defenders
2	Ciaran Clark	(Republic of Ireland)	CB / LB	26 September 1989 (aged 27)	2016	(England) Aston Villa	£5m
3	Paul Dummett	(Wales)	LB / CB	26 September 1991 (aged 25)	2010	(England) Newcastle United Academy	Free
5	Grant Hanley	(Scotland)	CB	20 November 1991 (aged 25)	2016	(England) Blackburn Rovers	£5.5m
6	Jamaal Lascelles	(England)	CB	11 November 1993 (aged 23)	2014	(England) Nottingham Forest	£4m
7	Achraf Lazaar	(Morocco)	LB / LW	22 January 1992 (aged 25)	2016	(Italy) Palermo	£3m
18	Chancel Mbemba	(Democratic Republic of the Congo)	CB	8 August 1994 (aged 22)	2015	(Belgium) Anderlecht	£8.5m
19	Massadio Haïdara	(France)	LB	2 December 1992 (aged 24)	2013	(France) Nancy	£2m
22	DeAndre Yedlin	(United States)	RB	9 July 1993 (aged 23)	2016	(England) Tottenham Hotspur	£5m
27	Jesús Gámez	(Spain)	RB / LB	10 April 1985 (aged 32)	2016	(Spain) Atlético Madrid	£1.5m
37	Stuart Findlay	(Scotland)	CB / LB	14 September 1995 (aged 21)	2016	(Scotland) Celtic	Free
38	Curtis Good	(Australia)	CB	23 March 1993 (aged 24)	2012	(Australia) Melbourne Heart	£300k
42	Jamie Sterry	(England)	RB	21 November 1995 (aged 21)	2015	(England) Newcastle United Academy	Free
Midfielders
4	Jack Colback	(England)	DM CM	24 October 1989 (aged 27)	2014	(England) Sunderland	Free
8	Vurnon Anita	(Netherlands)	DM / RB	4 April 1989 (aged 28)	2012	(Netherlands) Ajax	£6.7m
11	Matt Ritchie	(Scotland)	RW / LW	10 September 1989 (aged 27)	2016	(England) AFC Bournemouth	£12m
12	Jonjo Shelvey	(England)	CM	27 February 1992 (aged 25)	2016	(Wales) Swansea City	£12m
14	Isaac Hayden	(England)	CM / DM	22 March 1995 (aged 22)	2016	(England) Arsenal	£2.5m
15	Mohamed Diamé	(Senegal)	CM / AM	14 June 1987 (aged 29)	2016	(England) Hull City	£4.5m
16	Rolando Aarons	(England)	LW	16 November 1995 (aged 21)	2014	(England) Newcastle United Academy	Free
20	Yoan Gouffran	(France)	LW / ST	25 May 1986 (aged 30)	2013	(France) Bordeaux	£500k
30	Christian Atsu	(Ghana)	RW / LW	10 January 1992 (aged 25)	2016	(England) Chelsea	Loan
34	Sammy Ameobi	(Nigeria)	RW / LW / SS	1 May 1992 (aged 25)	2008	(England) Newcastle United Academy	Free
35	Daniel Barlaser	(Turkey)	CM / AM	18 January 1997 (aged 20)	2015	(England) Newcastle United Academy	Free
36	Yasin Ben El-Mhanni	(England)	LW / RW	26 October 1995 (aged 21)	2016	(England) Lewes	Free
–	Haris Vučkić	(Slovenia)	SS / AM	21 August 1992 (aged 24)	2009	(Slovenia) Domžale	£500k
Forwards
9	Dwight Gayle	(England)	ST	17 October 1989 (aged 27)	2016	(England) Crystal Palace	£10m
17	Ayoze Pérez	(Spain)	SS / ST	29 July 1993 (aged 23)	2014	(Spain) Tenerife	£1.6m
33	Daryl Murphy	(Republic of Ireland)	ST	15 March 1983 (aged 34)	2016	(England) Ipswich Town	£3.5m
45	Aleksandar Mitrović	(Serbia)	ST	16 September 1994 (aged 22)	2015	(Belgium) Anderlecht	£13m
Out on loan
1	Tim Krul	(Netherlands)	GK	3 April 1988 (aged 29)	2006	(Netherlands) ADO Den Haag	Free
10	Siem de Jong	(Netherlands)	AM / SS	28 January 1989 (aged 28)	2014	(Netherlands) Ajax	£7.5m
23	Henri Saivet	(Senegal)	CM / AM	26 October 1990 (aged 26)	2016	(France) Bordeaux	£5m
29	Emmanuel Rivière	(France)	ST	3 March 1990 (aged 27)	2014	(France) Monaco	£6.3m
32	Adam Armstrong	(England)	SS / ST / LW	10 February 1997 (aged 20)	2014	(England) Newcastle United Academy	Free
41	Freddie Woodman	(England)	GK	4 March 1997 (aged 20)	2014	(England) Newcastle United Academy	Free
43	Kevin Mbabu	(Switzerland)	RB / LB	19 April 1995 (aged 22)	2013	(Switzerland) Servette	£1m
–	Ľubomír Šatka	(Slovakia)	CB	2 December 1995 (aged 21)	2014	(England) Newcastle United Academy	Free
–	Florian Thauvin	(France)	RW / LW	26 January 1993 (aged 24)	2015	(France) Marseille	£12m
–	Callum Roberts	(England)	RW / LW	14 April 1997 (aged 20)	2014	(England) Newcastle United Academy	Free
–	Ivan Toney	(England)	ST	16 March 1996 (aged 21)	2015	(England) Northampton Town	£500k

=== Reserve team ===
Note: Flags indicate national team as defined under FIFA eligibility rules; some limited exceptions apply. Players may hold more than one non-FIFA nationality.

No.	Pos.	Nation	Player
—	GK	ENG	Nathan Harker
—	GK	ENG	Brendan Pearson
—	GK	ENG	Ben Smith
—	GK	ENG	Paul Woolston
—	DF	ENG	Liam Gibson
—	DF	ENG	Macaulay Gillesphey
—	DF	SCO	Kyle Cameron
—	DF	NIR	Michael Newberry
—	DF	GHA	Gideon Adu-Peprah
—	MF	ENG	Owen Bailey
—	MF	ENG	Stefan Broccoli
—	MF	ENG	Mackenzie Heaney

No.	Pos.	Nation	Player
—	MF	ENG	Jack Hunter
—	MF	ENG	Sean Longstaff
—	MF	ENG	Dan Lowther
—	MF	ENG	Callum Smith
—	MF	ENG	Liam Smith
—	MF	ENG	Dan Ward
—	FW	ENG	Luke Charman
—	FW	ENG	Tom Heardman
—	FW	ENG	Jamie Holmes
—	FW	ENG	Lewis McNall
—	FW	SCO	Owen Gallacher

=== Youth team ===
Note: Flags indicate national team as defined under FIFA eligibility rules; some limited exceptions apply. Players may hold more than one non-FIFA nationality.

No.	Pos.	Nation	Player
—	GK	ENG	Carl Robinson
—	GK	FIN	Otto Huuhtanen
—	DF	ENG	Lewis Cass
—	DF	ENG	Isaac Gamblin
—	DF	ENG	Lewis Gibson
—	DF	ENG	Ben Kitchen
—	DF	ENG	Craig Spooner
—	DF	ENG	Ollie Walters
—	DF	TOG	Yannick Aziakonou
—	MF	ENG	Kieren Aplin

No.	Pos.	Nation	Player
—	MF	ENG	Mace Goodridge
—	MF	ENG	Oliver Long
—	MF	ENG	Matty Longstaff
—	FW	ENG	Thomas Allan
—	FW	ENG	Jack Robson
—	FW	ENG	Kurtis Russell
—	FW	ENG	Kelland Watts
—	FW	ENG	Adam Wilson
—	FW	DEN	Elias Sorensen

== Transfers and loans ==
=== Transfers in ===
Date from	Position	Number	Nationality	Name	From	Fee	Ref.
29 June 2016	GK	28	(Belgium)	Matz Sels	(Belgium) Gent	£4,500,000	
1 July 2016	FW	9	(England)	Dwight Gayle	(England) Crystal Palace	£10,000,000	
1 July 2016	MF	11	(Scotland)	Matt Ritchie	(England) AFC Bournemouth	£12,000,000	
8 July 2016	DF	27	(Spain)	Jesús Gámez	(Spain) Atlético Madrid	£1,500,000	
11 July 2016	MF	14	(England)	Isaac Hayden	(England) Arsenal	£2,500,000	
21 July 2016	DF	5	(Scotland)	Grant Hanley	(England) Blackburn Rovers	£5,500,000	
3 August 2016	DF	2	(Republic of Ireland)	Ciaran Clark	(England) Aston Villa	£5,000,000	
3 August 2016	MF	15	(Senegal)	Mohamed Diamé	(England) Hull City	£4,500,000	
24 August 2016	DF	22	(United States)	DeAndre Yedlin	(England) Tottenham Hotspur	£5,000,000	
28 August 2016	FW	33	(Republic of Ireland)	Daryl Murphy	(England) Ipswich Town	£3,500,000	
28 August 2016	DF	7	(Morocco)	Achraf Lazaar	(Italy) Palermo	£3,000,000	

- Total spending: ▼£57,000,000

=== Transfers out ===
Date from	Position	Number	Nationality	Name	To	Fee	Ref.
1 July 2016	MF	14	(France)	Gabriel Obertan	(Russia) Anzhi Makhachkala	Free transfer	
1 July 2016	MF	31	(France)	Sylvain Marveaux	(France) FC Lorient	Free transfer	
1 July 2016	MF	25	(England)	Andros Townsend	(England) Crystal Palace	£13,000,000	
5 July 2016	DF	2	(Argentina)	Fabricio Coloccini	(Argentina) San Lorenzo	Free transfer	
9 July 2016	FW	9	(Senegal)	Papiss Cissé	(China) Shandong Luneng	£2,500,000	
22 July 2016	MF	5	(Netherlands)	Georginio Wijnaldum	(England) Liverpool	£25,000,000	
1 August 2016	DF	27	(England)	Steven Taylor	(United States) Portland Timbers	Free transfer	
11 August 2016	MF	—	(France)	Rémy Cabella	(France) Marseille	£8,000,000	
24 August 2016	DF	22	(Netherlands)	Daryl Janmaat	(England) Watford	£7,500,000	
26 August 2016	MF	—	(Burundi)	Gaël Bigirimana	(England) Coventry City	Free transfer	
31 August 2016	MF	7	(France)	Moussa Sissoko	(England) Tottenham Hotspur	£30,000,000	
9 February 2017	MF	24	(Ivory Coast)	Cheick Tioté	(China) Beijing BG	£1,000,000	

- Total incoming: ▲ ~ £87,000,000

=== Loans in ===
Date from	Position	Number	Nationality	Name	From	Expiry	Ref.
31 August 2016	MF	30	(Ghana)	Christian Atsu	(England) Chelsea	End of Season	

=== Loans out ===
Date from	Position	Number	Nationality	Name	To	Expiry	Ref.
4 August 2016	MF	—	(France)	Florian Thauvin	(France) Marseille	End of Season	
8 August 2016	FW	—	(England)	Ivan Toney	(England) Shrewsbury Town	3 January 2017	
22 August 2016	MF	10	(Netherlands)	Siem de Jong	(Netherlands) PSV	End of Season	
23 August 2016	DF	43	(Switzerland)	Kevin Mbabu	(Switzerland) Young Boys	End of Season	
24 August 2016	MF	23	(Senegal)	Henri Saivet	(France) Saint-Étienne	End of Season	
25 August 2016	GK	1	(Netherlands)	Tim Krul	(Netherlands) Ajax	31 January 2017	
30 August 2016	FW	32	(England)	Adam Armstrong	(England) Barnsley	End of Season	
31 August 2016	FW	29	(France)	Emmanuel Rivière	(Spain) Osasuna	End of Season	
31 August 2016	DF	42	(England)	Jamie Sterry	(England) Coventry City	4 January 2017	
31 August 2016	MF	—	(Slovenia)	Haris Vučkić	(England) Bradford City	3 January 2017	
31 August 2016	MF	34	(Nigeria)	Sammy Ameobi	(England) Bolton Wanderers	3 January 2017	
9 January 2017	MF	—	(England)	Callum Roberts	(Scotland) Kilmarnock	End of Season	
9 January 2017	GK	41	(England)	Freddie Woodman	(Scotland) Kilmarnock	End of Season	
11 January 2017	DF	—	(Slovakia)	Ľubomír Šatka	(Slovakia) DAC Dunajská Streda	End of Season	
12 January 2017	FW	—	(England)	Ivan Toney	(England) Scunthorpe United	End of Season	
31 January 2017	GK	1	(Netherlands)	Tim Krul	(Netherlands) AZ	End of Season	

== Pre-season friendlies ==
16 July 2016 Friendly	Bohemians	0–6	Newcastle United	Dublin
14:00		Report	Ritchie 15'; Mitrović 30' (pen.); Gayle 52'; Thauvin 55'; Aarons 59'; Wijnaldum 75'	Stadium: Dalymount Park; Attendance: 4,200; Referee: Robert Harvey

20 July 2016 Friendly	Doncaster Rovers	2–2	Newcastle United	Doncaster
19:45	Williams 19', 45+4'	Report	Hayden 51'; Ayoze 90+2'	Stadium: Keepmoat Stadium; Attendance: 5,698; Referee: Ross Joyce

23 July 2016 Friendly	KSC Lokeren	0–4	Newcastle United	Lokeren
16:30		Report	Ayoze 13', 39'; Janmaat 26'; Shelvey 48'	Stadium: Daknamstadion; Attendance: 2,876; Referee: Christof Dierick

26 July 2016 Friendly	Southend United	0–2	Newcastle United	Southend-on-Sea
19:45		Report	Anita 48'; Gouffran 78'	Stadium: Roots Hall; Attendance: 6,570; Referee: Keith Stroud

30 July 2016 Friendly	Newcastle United	3–2	Vitesse	Newcastle upon Tyne
15:00	Leerdam 22' (o.g.); Gayle 36'; Colback 41'	Report	Nathan 53'; Kashia 61'	Stadium: St James' Park; Attendance: 19,200; Referee: Sebastien Stockbridge

== Competitions ==
=== Overall summary ===
Competition	Started round	Current position / round	Final position / round	First match	Last match
Championship	–	–	1st (champions)	5 August 2016	7 May 2017
EFL Cup	Second round	–	Fifth round	23 August 2016	29 November 2016
FA Cup	Third round	–	Fourth round	7 January 2017	28 January 2017

=== Overview ===
Competition	Record							
Competition	P	W	D	L	GF	GA	GD	Win %
Championship	46	29	7	10	85	40	+45	63.04
EFL Cup	4	3	1	0	11	1	+10	75.00
FA Cup	3	1	1	1	4	5	−1	33.33
Total	53	33	9	11	100	46	+54	62.26

Source: Competitions

=== EFL Championship ===
==== League table ====
Pos	Team	Pld	W	D	L	GF	GA	GD	Pts	Promotion, qualification or relegation
1	Newcastle United (C, P)	46	29	7	10	85	40	+45	94	Promotion to the Premier League
2	Brighton & Hove Albion (P)	46	28	9	9	74	40	+34	93	Promotion to the Premier League
3	Reading	46	26	7	13	68	64	+4	85	Qualification for the Championship play-offs (Note: Four teams play for one spot and promotion to the Premier League.)
4	Sheffield Wednesday	46	24	9	13	60	45	+15	81	Qualification for the Championship play-offs
5	Huddersfield Town (O, P)	46	25	6	15	56	58	−2	81	Qualification for the Championship play-offs

Source: English Football League, Soccerway
Rules for classification: 1) Points; 2) Goal difference; 3) Number of goals scored; 4) Points in head-to-head matches; 5) Goal difference in head-to-head matches; 6) Goals scored in head-to-head matches; 7) Play-off.
(C) Champions; (O) Play-off winners; (P) Promoted

==== Results by matchday ====
Round	1	2	3	4	5	6	7	8	9	10	11	12	13	14	15	16	17	18	19	20	21	22	23	24	25	26	27	28	29	30	31	32	33	34	35	36	37	38	39	40	41	42	43	44	45	46
Ground	A	H	H	A	H	A	A	H	A	H	A	H	A	H	A	H	A	H	A	H	A	A	H	H	A	A	H	H	H	A	A	H	H	A	A	A	H	A	H	H	A	H	A	H	A	H
Result	L	L	W	W	W	W	W	L	D	W	W	W	W	W	W	W	W	L	L	W	W	W	L	W	L	W	W	D	W	W	D	W	D	W	W	D	L	D	W	W	L	D	L	W	W	W
Position	20	21	17	7	4	2	2	3	5	3	3	2	1	1	1	1	1	1	1	1	1	1	2	1	2	1	1	2	1	1	1	1	2	1	1	1	1	1	1	1	2	2	2	2	2	1

A = Away; H = Home; W = Win; D = Draw; L = Loss

==== Matches ====
The fixtures for the 2016–17 season were released on 22 June 2016.

5 August 2016 1	Fulham	1–0	Newcastle United	London
19:45	Odoi (yellow card) 10'; Smith 45'	Report	Hanley (yellow card) 68'; Dummett (yellow card) 75'; Janmaat (yellow card) 90+4'	Stadium: Craven Cottage; Attendance: 23,922 (6,452 away); Referee: Simon Hooper
Note: Live on Sky Sports

13 August 2016 2	Newcastle United	1–2	Huddersfield Town	Newcastle upon Tyne
15:00	Gayle (penalty missed) 60', 60', (yellow card) 63'	Report	Hudson (yellow card) 21'; Wells 45+1'; Löwe (yellow card) 62'; Payne 82'	Stadium: St James' Park; Attendance: 52,079 (3,200 away); Referee: Oliver Langford

17 August 2016 3	Newcastle United	4–1	Reading	Newcastle upon Tyne
19:45	Gayle (yellow card) 3', (goal) 69', 89'; Hayden 20'; Ritchie 50' (pen.)	Report	Obita (yellow card) 19'; Williams (yellow card) 40'; McCleary 45' (pen.); Gunter (yellow card) 49'; Kermorgant (yellow card) 62'; Evans (yellow card) 68'	Stadium: St James' Park; Attendance: 48,209 (787 away); Referee: Andrew Madley

20 August 2016 4	Bristol City	0–1	Newcastle United	Bristol
15:00		Report	Gayle 19'; Sels (yellow card) 90'	Stadium: Ashton Gate; Attendance: 22,512 (2,501 away); Referee: Tony Harrington

27 August 2016 5	Newcastle United	2–0	Brighton & Hove Albion	Newcastle upon Tyne
17:30	Lascelles 15', (yellow card) 53'; Shelvey (yellow card) 22', (goal) 63'; Ayoze (yellow card) 33'; Ritchie (yellow card) 34'	Report	Baldock (yellow card) 45+1' (yellow-red card) 55'; Knockaert (yellow card) 85'	Stadium: St James' Park; Attendance: 49,196 (1,632 away); Referee: Keith Stroud
Note: Live on Sky Sports

10 September 2016 6	Derby County	0–2	Newcastle United	Derby
17:30		Report	Gouffran 20', (yellow card) 60'; Shelvey (yellow card) 24'; Gayle (yellow card) 75'; Yedlin 90+1'	Stadium: iPro Stadium; Attendance: 30,405 (3,177 away); Referee: Darren Bond
Note: Live on Sky Sports

13 September 2016 7	Queens Park Rangers	0–6	Newcastle United	London
19:45		Report	Shelvey 12', 48'; Ayoze 30'; Clark 56'; Mitrović 63'; Hanley 79'	Stadium: Loftus Road; Attendance: 17,404 (3,238 away); Referee: Andy Davies

17 September 2016 8	Newcastle United	0–2	Wolverhampton Wanderers	Newcastle upon Tyne
15:00	Dummett (yellow card) 40'; Diamé (yellow card) 45+1'; Ritchie (yellow card) 51'; Anita (red card) 87'	Report	Mbemba 29' (o.g.); Batth (yellow card) 35'; Saïss (yellow card) 36'; Teixeira (yellow card) 56'; Costa 62'; Borthwick-Jackson (yellow card) 72'; Edwards (yellow card) 79'	Stadium: St James' Park; Attendance: 52,117 (3,257 away); Referee: Tim Robinson

24 September 2016 9	Aston Villa	1–1	Newcastle United	Birmingham
17:30	Chester (yellow card) 41'; Tshibola (yellow card) 79', (goal) 88'	Report	Shelvey (yellow card) 27'; Elphick 29' (o.g.)	Stadium: Villa Park; Attendance: 32,062 (2,788 away); Referee: Christopher Kavanagh
Note: Live on Sky Sports

28 September 2016 10	Newcastle United	4–3	Norwich City	Newcastle upon Tyne
19:45	Colback (yellow card) 9'; Gayle 24', 71', 90+6'; Ritchie (yellow card) 40'; Dummett (yellow card) 43'; Mitrović (yellow card) 73'; Lascelles (yellow card) 77'; Gouffran 90+5'	Report	Dorrans 44' (pen.), (yellow card) 60'; Brady (yellow card) 45+2'; Jerome 52', (yellow card) 78'; Howson (yellow card) 59'; Murphy 69'; Olsson (yellow card) 73'	Stadium: St James' Park; Attendance: 48,236 (876 away); Referee: Peter Bankes

1 October 2016 11	Rotherham United	0–1	Newcastle United	Rotherham
15:00	Frecklington (yellow card) 37'; Ward (yellow card) 58'	Report	Atsu 41'; Diamé (yellow card) 81'	Stadium: New York Stadium; Attendance: 11,653 (2,587 away); Referee: Roger East

15 October 2016 12	Newcastle United	3–1	Brentford	Newcastle upon Tyne
15:00	Clark 11'; Gayle 16', 49'; Gouffran (yellow card) 26'; Colback (yellow card) 38'; Atsu (yellow card) 42'	Report	Dean (yellow card) 24'; Hogan 52'; Sawyers (yellow card) 72'; Woods (yellow card) 73'	Stadium: St James' Park; Attendance: 51,885 (2,778 away); Referee: Simon Hooper

18 October 2016 13	Barnsley	0–2	Newcastle United	Barnsley
19:45	Hourihane (yellow card) 38'	Report	Lascelles (yellow card) 40'; Gayle 49', 68'; Shelvey (yellow card) 74'	Stadium: Oakwell; Attendance: 18,597 (5,501 away); Referee: Paul Tierney

22 October 2016 14	Newcastle United	3–0	Ipswich Town	Newcastle upon Tyne
15:00	Ayoze 1', 73'; Colback (yellow card) 27'; Ritchie 78'; Dummett (yellow card) 86'	Report	Knudsen (yellow card) 41'	Stadium: St James' Park; Attendance: 51,963 (2,759 away); Referee: James Adcock

29 October 2016 15	Preston North End	1–2	Newcastle United	Preston
15:00	Robinson (yellow card) 61'; Pearson (yellow card) 64'; Johnson (yellow card) 64'; Lascelles 90' (o.g.)	Report	Mitrović 59', 71'; Hayden (yellow card) 76'; Ritchie (yellow card) 89'; Darlow (yellow card) 90+7'	Stadium: Deepdale; Attendance: 20,724 (5,714 away); Referee: Christopher Kavanagh

5 November 2016 16	Newcastle United	2–1	Cardiff City	Newcastle upon Tyne
15:00	Atsu 3'; Gouffran 45'	Report	Wittingham 77'; Gunnarsson (yellow card) 85'	Stadium: St James' Park; Attendance: 51,257 (1,063 away); Referee: Tony Harrington

20 November 2016 17	Leeds United	0–2	Newcastle United	Leeds
13:15	Jansson (yellow card) 44'	Report	Gayle 23', 54'; Colback (yellow card) 59'	Stadium: Elland Road; Attendance: 36,002 (2,764 away); Referee: Graham Scott
Note: Live on Sky Sports

26 November 2016 18	Newcastle United	0–1	Blackburn Rovers	Newcastle upon Tyne
15:00	Hayden (yellow card) 83'	Report	Conway (yellow card) 24'; Lowe (yellow card) 68'; Mulgrew 75'; Marshall (yellow card) 90+1'	Stadium: St James' Park; Attendance: 52,092 (1,559 away); Referee: David Coote

2 December 2016 19	Nottingham Forest	2–1	Newcastle United	Nottingham
19:45	Bendtner (penalty missed) 34', 52'; Mancienne (yellow card) 44'; Lansbury (penalty missed) 45+4', (yellow card) 72'; Lascelles 86' (o.g.)	Report	Shelvey (red card) 33'; Ritchie 45'; Dummett (red card) 45+1'; Darlow (yellow card) 45+2'; Gouffran (yellow card) 53'; Yedlin (yellow card) 90+3'	Stadium: City Ground; Attendance: 21,317 (1,866 away); Referee: Stephen Martin
Note: Live on Sky Sports

10 December 2016 20	Newcastle United	4–0	Birmingham City	Newcastle upon Tyne
15:00	Gayle 18', 24', 77'; Gouffran 47'; Ritchie (yellow card) 59'; Hayden (yellow card) 75'	Report	Tesche (yellow card) 32'	Stadium: St James' Park; Attendance: 52,145 (3,110 away); Referee: Andy Davies

14 December 2016 21	Wigan Athletic	0–2	Newcastle United	Wigan
19:45		Report	Diamé 26'; Hayden (yellow card) 32'; Atsu 78'	Stadium: DW Stadium; Attendance: 14,562 (4,291 away); Referee: Simon Hooper
Note: Live on Sky Sports

17 December 2016 22	Burton Albion	1–2	Newcastle United	Burton upon Trent
15:00	Dyer 20'; Naylor (yellow card) 19'; Irvine (yellow card) 45+3'	Report	Gayle 15'; Diamé 34'; Hayden (yellow card) 56'	Stadium: Pirelli Stadium; Attendance: 6,665 (1,782 away); Referee: Lee Probert

26 December 2016 23	Newcastle United	0–1	Sheffield Wednesday	Newcastle upon Tyne
19:45	Hayden (yellow card) 52'	Report	Bannan (yellow card) 30'; Pudil (yellow card) 35'; Loovens 53'; Reach (yellow card) 70'; Hutchinson (yellow card) 76'; Wallace (yellow card) 85'; Palmer (yellow card) 90+5'	Stadium: St James' Park; Attendance: 52,179; Referee: Paul Tierney
Note: Live on Sky Sports

30 December 2016 24	Newcastle United	3–1	Nottingham Forest	Newcastle upon Tyne
19:45	Ritchie 4'; Clark (yellow card) 12'; Colback (yellow card) 53'; Gayle 63', 80'; Yedlin (yellow card) 65'	Report	Lam (yellow card) 26'; Dumitru 29'; Mills (yellow card) 59' (yellow-red card) 60'; Pereira (yellow card) 61'	Stadium: St James' Park; Attendance: 52,228 (3,086 away); Referee: Keith Stroud

2 January 2017 25	Blackburn Rovers	1–0	Newcastle United	Blackburn
15:00	Lowe (yellow card) 53'; Mulgrew 74'	Report	Dummett (yellow card) 64'; Colback (yellow card) 73'	Stadium: Ewood Park; Attendance: 18,524 (6,943 away); Referee: Andy Woolmer
Note: Live on Sky Sports

14 January 2017 26	Brentford	1–2	Newcastle United	Brentford
15:00	Vibe 52', (yellow card) 81'	Report	Gayle 20'; Dummett (yellow card) 31'; Murphy 79'	Stadium: Griffin Park; Attendance: 11,435 (1,633 away); Referee: Christopher Kavanagh

21 January 2017 27	Newcastle United	4–0	Rotherham United	Newcastle upon Tyne
15:00	Murphy 45+3'; Ritchie 49', 78'; Ayoze 59'	Report	Smallwood (yellow card) 45+2'	Stadium: St James' Park; Attendance: 52,208 (3,183 away); Referee: Jeremy Simpson

1 February 2017 28	Newcastle United	2–2	Queens Park Rangers	Newcastle upon Tyne
19:45	Shelvey 1'; Ritchie 54', (yellow card) 89'	Report	Perch (yellow card) 40'; Washington 44'; Clark 90' (o.g.)	Stadium: St James' Park; Attendance: 47,907 (520 away); Referee: Tim Robinson
Note: Live on Sky Sports

4 February 2017 29	Newcastle United	1–0	Derby County	Newcastle upon Tyne
15:00	Ritchie 27', (yellow card) 86'; Dummett (yellow card) 82'	Report	de Sart (yellow card) 79'	Stadium: St James' Park; Attendance: 52,231 (3,185 away); Referee: Darren Bond

11 February 2017 30	Wolverhampton Wanderers	0–1	Newcastle United	Wolverhampton
17:30	Doherty (yellow card) 64'	Report	Mitrović (yellow card) 15', (goal) 44'; Ritchie (yellow card) 67'; Colback (yellow card) 88'; Ayoze (yellow card) 89'; Darlow (yellow card) 90+2'	Stadium: Molineux; Attendance: 24,876 (4,164 away); Referee: Craig Pawson
Note: Live on Sky Sports

14 February 2017 31	Norwich City	2–2	Newcastle United	Norwich
19:45	Murphy 12'; Jerome 17'; Dijks (yellow card) 82'; Whittaker (yellow card) 90+4'	Report	Ayoze 1'; Colback (yellow card) 27'; Lascelles (yellow card) 48', (goal) 81'	Stadium: Carrow Road; Attendance: 26,841 (2,401 away); Referee: Andrew Madley

20 February 2017 32	Newcastle United	2–0	Aston Villa	Newcastle upon Tyne
20:00	Shelvey (yellow card) 34'; Lascelles (yellow card) 38'; Gouffran 42'; Lansbury 59' (o.g.)	Report		Stadium: St James' Park; Attendance: 50,024 (1,770 away); Referee: Peter Bankes
Note: Live on Sky Sports

25 February 2017 33	Newcastle United	2–2	Bristol City	Newcastle upon Tyne
15:00	Smith 59' (o.g.); Clark 82'	Report	Wilbraham 11', (yellow card) 51'; Cotterill 21'	Stadium: St James' Park; Attendance: 52,131 (2,703 away); Referee: Christopher Kavanagh

28 February 2017 34	Brighton & Hove Albion	1–2	Newcastle United	Falmer
19:45	Murray 14' (pen.), (yellow card) 90+2'; Knockaert (yellow card) 38'; Duffy (yellow card) 58'	Report	Yedlin (yellow card) 37'; Diamé 81'; Ayoze 89'	Stadium: Falmer Stadium; Attendance: 30,230 (2,604 away); Referee: Bobby Madley
Note: Live on Sky Sports

4 March 2017 35	Huddersfield Town	1–3	Newcastle United	Huddersfield
17:30	Schindler (yellow card) 33'; Mooy 72' (pen.)	Report	Ritchie 10' (pen.); Murphy 32'; Colback (yellow card) 35'; Anita (yellow card) 45+2'; Clark (yellow card) 46'; Shelvey (yellow card) 61'; Gayle 90+1'	Stadium: John Smith's Stadium; Attendance: 23,213 (2,000 away); Referee: Roger East
Note: Live on Sky Sports

7 March 2017 36	Reading	0–0	Newcastle United	Reading
20:00	Gunter (yellow card) 90+2'	Report		Stadium: Madjeski Stadium; Attendance: 23,121 (3,704 away); Referee: Andy Davies

11 March 2017 37	Newcastle United	1–3	Fulham	Newcastle upon Tyne
15:00	Atsu (yellow card) 50'; Clark (yellow card) 60'; Murphy 76'; Shelvey (yellow card) 79'; Dummett (yellow card) 89'	Report	Cairney 15'; Sessegnon 51', 59'; McDonald (yellow card) 73'; Ream (penalty missed) 90+2'	Stadium: St James' Park; Attendance: 51,903 (1,643 away); Referee: James Linington

18 March 2017 38	Birmingham City	0–0	Newcastle United	Birmingham
15:00	Robinson (yellow card) 56'	Report		Stadium: St Andrew's; Attendance: 19,796 (3,229 away); Referee: Simon Hooper

1 April 2017 39	Newcastle United	2–1	Wigan Athletic	Newcastle upon Tyne
15:00	Diamé (yellow card) 17'; Gayle 36'; Ritchie 57'	Report	Burn (yellow card) 29'; Morsy (yellow card) 39'; Jacobs 50'	Stadium: St James' Park; Attendance: 51,849 (833 away); Referee: David Coote

5 April 2017 40	Newcastle United	1–0	Burton Albion	Newcastle upon Tyne
19:45	Lascelles (yellow card) 50'; Ritchie 68'	Report		Stadium: St James' Park; Attendance: 48,814 (763 away); Referee: Keith Stroud

8 April 2017 41	Sheffield Wednesday	2–1	Newcastle United	Sheffield
17:30	Bannan (yellow card) 18'; Lees 59'; Fletcher 68'; Wallace (yellow card) 70'	Report	Diamé (yellow card) 44'; Shelvey 88'	Stadium: Hillsborough; Attendance: 28,883 (3,100 away); Referee: Stuart Attwell
Note: Live on Sky Sports

14 April 2017 42	Newcastle United	1–1	Leeds United	Newcastle upon Tyne
19:45	Lascelles 67'; Shelvey (yellow card) 90+4'; Colback (yellow card) 90+4'	Report	Jansson (yellow card) 52'; Bartley (yellow card) 54'; Phillips (yellow card) 76'; Wood 90+5'	Stadium: St James' Park; Attendance: 52,301 (3,200 away); Referee: Christopher Kavanagh
Note: Live on Sky Sports

17 April 2017 43	Ipswich Town	3–1	Newcastle United	Ipswich
15:00	Sears 42'; McGoldrick (yellow card) 60', (goal) 69'; Lawrance (yellow card) 65'; Huws 90+3'	Report	Hayden (yellow card) 50'; Murphy 62'	Stadium: Portman Road; Attendance: 25,684 (1,952 away); Referee: Tim Robinson

24 April 2017 44	Newcastle United	4–1	Preston North End	Newcastle upon Tyne
19:45	Ayoze 7', 67'; Atsu 45'; Shelvey (yellow card) 56'; Ritchie 65' (pen.), (yellow card) 82'	Report	Hugill 14'; Browning (yellow card) 27'; Gallagher (red card) 64'	Stadium: St James' Park; Attendance: 50,212 (535 away); Referee: Andrew Madley
Note: Live on Sky Sports

28 April 2017 45	Cardiff City	0–2	Newcastle United	Cardiff
19:45	Richards (yellow card) 79'	Report	Atsu 55'; Hayden 65'	Stadium: Cardiff City Stadium; Attendance: 23,153 (4,262 away); Referee: Graham Scott
Note: Live on Sky Sports

7 May 2017 46	Newcastle United	3–0	Barnsley	Newcastle upon Tyne
12:00	Ayoze 23'; Shelvey (yellow card) 26'; Mbemba 59'; Gayle 90'	Report		Stadium: St James' Park; Attendance: 52,276 (2,764 away); Referee: James Linington

=== EFL Cup ===
23 August 2016 Second round	Newcastle United	2–0	Cheltenham Town	Newcastle upon Tyne
19:45	Ayoze 45+2', 47'	Report	Rowe (yellow card) 51'	Stadium: St James' Park; Attendance: 21,972; Referee: Stephen Martin

20 September 2016 Third round	Newcastle United	2–0	Wolverhampton Wanderers	Newcastle upon Tyne
19:45	Ritchie 29'; Gouffran 31', (yellow card) 63'; Ayoze (yellow card) 90+5'	Report	Saville (yellow card) 81'	Stadium: St James' Park; Attendance: 34,735; Referee: Andy Woolmer

25 October 2016 Fourth round	Newcastle United	6–0	Preston North End	Newcastle upon Tyne
19:45	Mitrović 19', 55', (yellow card) 55'; Diamé 38', 87'; Ritchie 53' (pen.); Ayoze 90+1'	Report	Doyle (yellow card) 19'; Browne (red card) 27'; Wright (yellow card) 53'	Stadium: St James' Park; Attendance: 49,042; Referee: Andrew Madley

29 November 2016 Fifth round	Hull City	1–1 (a.e.t.) (3–1 p)	Newcastle United	Kingston upon Hull
19:45	Snodgrass (yellow card) 45', (goal) 99'; Robertson (yellow card) 77'; Huddlestone (yellow card) 89'; Mbokani (red card) 89'	Report	Hayden (yellow card) 63'; Gouffran (yellow card) 67'; Lascelles (yellow card) 89'; Diamé 98'	Stadium: KCOM Stadium; Attendance: 16,243; Referee: Neil Swarbrick
	Penalties
	Snodgrass (penalty scored); Dawson (penalty scored); Huddlestone (penalty scored)		Shelvey (penalty missed); Gayle (penalty missed); Atsu (penalty scored); Gouffran (penalty missed)

=== FA Cup ===
7 January 2017 Third round	Birmingham City	1–1	Newcastle United	Birmingham
15:00	Jutkiewicz 42'	Report	Murphy 5'; Hayden (yellow card) 68'	Stadium: St Andrew's; Attendance: 13,171; Referee: Neil Swarbrick

18 January 2017 Third round replay	Newcastle United	3–1	Birmingham City	Newcastle upon Tyne
19:45	Ritchie 9' (pen.), 90+2'; Gouffran 34'; Tioté (yellow card) 69'	Report	Lagzdins (yellow card) 9'; Shotton (yellow card) 34'; Cotterill 71'; Grounds (yellow card) 87'	Stadium: St James' Park; Attendance: 34,896; Referee: Lee Probert

28 January 2017 Fourth round	Oxford United	3–0	Newcastle United	Oxford
15:00	Hemmings 46', (yellow card) 57'; Edwards (yellow card) 65'; Nelson 79'; Martínez 87'	Report	Mitrović (penalty missed) 66'; Hanley (yellow card) 90+1'	Stadium: Kassam Stadium; Attendance: 11,810; Referee: David Coote

== Statistics ==
=== Appearances and goals ===
Last updated on 7 May 2017.

No.	Pos	Nat	Player	Total		Championship		EFL Cup		FA Cup	
No.	Pos	Nat	Player	Apps	Goals	Apps	Goals	Apps	Goals	Apps	Goals
Goalkeepers
21	GK	(Republic of Ireland) IRL	Rob Elliot	3	0	3	0	0	0	0	0
26	GK	(England) ENG	Karl Darlow	36	0	34	0	2	0	0	0
28	GK	(Belgium) BEL	Matz Sels	14	0	9	0	2	0	3	0
Defenders
2	DF	(Republic of Ireland) IRL	Ciaran Clark	36	3	34	3	2	0	0	0
3	DF	(Wales) WAL	Paul Dummett	46	0	44+1	0	1	0	0	0
5	DF	(Scotland) SCO	Grant Hanley	15	1	5+5	1	2	0	3	0
6	DF	(England) ENG	Jamaal Lascelles	47	3	41+2	3	2+1	0	1	0
7	DF	(Morocco) MAR	Achraf Lazaar	9	0	0+4	0	2	0	3	0
18	DF	(Democratic Republic of the Congo) COD	Chancel Mbemba	13	1	12	1	1	0	0	0
19	DF	(France) FRA	Massadio Haïdara	3	0	0+1	0	0	0	2	0
22	DF	(United States) USA	DeAndre Yedlin	32	1	21+6	1	2+1	0	2	0
27	DF	(Spain) ESP	Jesús Gámez	7	0	2+3	0	1	0	1	0
37	DF	(Scotland) SCO	Stuart Findlay	1	0	0	0	0	0	1	0
38	DF	(Australia) AUS	Curtis Good	1	0	0	0	0	0	1	0
42	DF	(England) ENG	Jamie Sterry	3	0	0+2	0	1	0	0	0
Midfielders
4	MF	(England) ENG	Jack Colback	34	0	24+5	0	3	0	1+1	0
8	MF	(Netherlands) NED	Vurnon Anita	31	0	24+3	0	1+2	0	1	0
11	MF	(Scotland) SCO	Matt Ritchie	48	16	40+2	12	3	2	1+2	2
12	MF	(England) ENG	Jonjo Shelvey	48	5	38+4	5	3+1	0	2	0
14	MF	(England) ENG	Isaac Hayden	37	2	28+5	2	2	0	0+2	0
15	MF	(Senegal) SEN	Mohamed Diamé	39	6	25+10	3	4	3	0	0
16	MF	(England) ENG	Rolando Aarons	5	0	1+3	0	1	0	0	0
20	MF	(France) FRA	Yoan Gouffran	44	7	33+5	5	2+1	1	1+2	1
30	MF	(Ghana) GHA	Christian Atsu	34	5	15+17	5	1+1	0	0	0
34	MF	(Nigeria) NGA	Sammy Ameobi	4	0	0+4	0	0	0	0	0
35	MF	(Turkey) TUR	Daniel Barlaser	2	0	0	0	0	0	2	0
36	MF	(England) ENG	Yasin Ben El-Mhanni	2	0	0	0	0	0	2	0
Forwards
9	FW	(England) ENG	Dwight Gayle	34	23	26+6	23	1+1	0	0	0
17	FW	(Spain) ESP	Ayoze Pérez	41	12	25+11	9	1+2	3	1+1	0
33	FW	(Republic of Ireland) IRL	Daryl Murphy	18	6	7+8	5	1+1	0	1	1
45	FW	(Serbia) SRB	Aleksandar Mitrović	29	6	11+14	4	2	2	2	0
Player(s) who left on loan but featured this season
32	FW	(England) ENG	Adam Armstrong	2	0	0+2	0	0	0	0	0
Player(s) who left permanently but featured this season
22	DF	(Netherlands) NED	Daryl Janmaat	2	0	2	0	0	0	0	0
24	MF	(Ivory Coast) CIV	Cheick Tioté	3	0	0+1	0	0	0	2	0

=== Cards ===
Accounts for all competitions. Last updated on 7 May 2017.

No.	Pos.	Name	Yellow card	Red card
2	DF	(Republic of Ireland) Ciaran Clark	2	0
3	DF	(Wales) Paul Dummett	8	1
4	MF	(England) Jack Colback	10	0
5	DF	(Scotland) Grant Hanley	2	0
6	DF	(England) Jamaal Lascelles	7	0
8	MF	(Netherlands) Vurnon Anita	1	1
9	FW	(England) Dwight Gayle	3	0
11	MF	(Scotland) Matt Ritchie	10	0
12	MF	(England) Jonjo Shelvey	10	1
14	MF	(England) Isaac Hayden	9	0
15	MF	(Senegal) Mohamed Diamé	4	0
17	FW	(Spain) Ayoze Pérez	4	0
20	MF	(France) Yoan Gouffran	4	0
22	DF	(Netherlands) Daryl Janmaat	1	0
22	DF	(United States) DeAndre Yedlin	3	0
24	MF	(Ivory Coast) Cheick Tioté	1	0
26	GK	(England) Karl Darlow	3	0
28	GK	(Belgium) Matz Sels	1	0
30	MF	(Ghana) Christian Atsu	2	0
45	FW	(Serbia) Aleksandar Mitrović	4	0

=== Goals ===
Last updated on 7 May 2017.

Place	Position	Number	Nation	Name	Championship	EFL Cup	FA Cup	Total
1	FW	9	(England)	Dwight Gayle	23	0	0	23
2	MF	11	(Scotland)	Matt Ritchie	12	2	2	16
3	FW	17	(Spain)	Ayoze Pérez	9	3	0	12
4	MF	20	(France)	Yoan Gouffran	5	1	1	7
5	MF	15	(Senegal)	Mohamed Diamé	3	3	0	6
5	FW	33	(Republic of Ireland)	Daryl Murphy	5	0	1	6
5	FW	45	(Serbia)	Aleksandar Mitrović	4	2	0	6
8	MF	12	(England)	Jonjo Shelvey	5	0	0	5
8	MF	30	(Ghana)	Christian Atsu	5	0	0	5
10	DF	2	(Republic of Ireland)	Ciaran Clark	3	0	0	3
10	DF	6	(England)	Jamaal Lascelles	3	0	0	3
10	Own Goals				3	0	0	3
13	MF	14	(England)	Isaac Hayden	2	0	0	2
14	DF	5	(Scotland)	Grant Hanley	1	0	0	1
14	DF	18	(Democratic Republic of the Congo)	Chancel Mbemba	1	0	0	1
14	DF	22	(United States)	DeAndre Yedlin	1	0	0	1
TOTALS					85	11	4	100

=== Clean sheets ===
Last updated on 7 May 2017.

Place	Number	Nation	Name	Championship	EFL Cup	FA Cup	Total
1	26	(England)	Karl Darlow	13	2	0	15
2	28	(Belgium)	Matz Sels	4	1	0	5
3	21	(Republic of Ireland)	Rob Elliot	2	0	0	2
TOTALS				19	3	0	22
