= Huhtanen =

Huhtanen is a Finnish surname. Notable people include:

- Miika Huhtanen (born 1993), Finnish ice hockey player
- Tuomas Huhtanen (born 1987), Finnish ice hockey player
- Veikko Huhtanen (1919–1976), Finnish gymnast

== See also ==
- Huuhtanen
