= 2018–19 Scunthorpe United F.C. season =

Scunthorpe United F.C.
2018–19 season
- Chairman: Peter Swann
- Manager: Nick Daws (until 24 August); Stuart McCall (between 27 August–25 March); Andy Dawson (25 March 2019 until end of season)
- Stadium: Glanford Park
- League One: 23rd (relegated)
- FA Cup: Second round (eliminated by Shrewsbury Town)
- EFL Cup: First round (eliminated by Doncaster Rovers)
- EFL Trophy: Group stage
- Top goalscorer: League: Lee Novak (9); All: Lee Novak (10)
- Highest home attendance: 7,263 (19 Jan 2019 vs. Sunderland)
- Lowest home attendance: 874 (4 Sep 2018 vs. Wolves U21)
- Average home league attendance: 4,227
- Biggest win: 4–1 (12 Mar 2019 vs. Southend United)
- Biggest defeat: 0–5 (22 Aug 2018 vs. Fleetwood Town)

The 2018–19 season is Scunthorpe United's 120th season in their existence and their fifth consecutive season in League One. Along with competing in League One, the club will also participate in the FA Cup, EFL Cup and EFL Trophy. The season covers the period from 1 July 2018 to 30 June 2019.

== Competitions ==
=== Pre-season friendlies ===
The Iron revealed pre-season fixtures against Winterton Rangers, Alfreton Town, SV Seekirchen, SV Wals-Grünau, Nottingham Forest and Lincoln City.

7 July 2018 Friendly	Winterton Rangers	1–8	Scunthorpe United	Winterton
12:00 BST		Report	Holmes 3'; Novak 22'; 50'; Wootton 57', 88'; Olomola 58'; Sutton 60'; Humphrys 89'	Stadium: West Street

13 July 2018 Friendly	Alfreton Town	v	Scunthorpe United	Alfreton
19:45 BST				Stadium: North Street

18 July 2018 Friendly	Seekirchen	v	Scunthorpe United	Obertraun, Austria
17:30 BST				Stadium: BSFZ Obertraun

21 July 2018 Friendly	SV Wals-Grünau	v	Scunthorpe United	Wals-Siezenheim, Austria
16:00 BST				Stadium: Hans-Ludwig-Stadium

25 July 2018 Friendly	Scunthorpe United	0–1	Nottingham Forest	Scunthorpe
19:30 BST		Report	Yates 24'	Stadium: Glanford Park

28 July 2018 Friendly	Scunthorpe United	0–1	Lincoln City	Scunthorpe
12:00 BST		Report	Wharton 79'	Stadium: Glanford Park

=== League One ===
==== League table ====
Pos	Team	Pld	W	D	L	GF	GA	GD	Pts	Promotion, qualification or relegation
20	AFC Wimbledon	46	13	11	22	42	63	−21	50	
21	Plymouth Argyle (R)	46	13	11	22	56	80	−24	50	Relegation to EFL League Two
22	Walsall (R)	46	12	11	23	49	71	−22	47	Relegation to EFL League Two
23	Scunthorpe United (R)	46	12	10	24	53	83	−30	46	Relegation to EFL League Two
24	Bradford City (R)	46	11	8	27	49	77	−28	41	Relegation to EFL League Two

Source: EFL Official Website
Rules for classification: 1) Points; 2) Goal difference; 3) Number of goals scored; 4) Head-to-head results
(R) Relegated

==== Results summary ====
Overall								Home						Away					
Pld	W	D	L	GF	GA	GD	Pts	W	D	L	GF	GA	GD	W	D	L	GF	GA	GD
46	12	10	24	53	83	−30	46	6	7	10	31	42	−11	6	3	14	22	41	−19

Last updated: 4 May 2019.
Source: BBC

==== Results by matchday ====
Matchday	1	2	3	4	5	6	7	8	9	10	11	12	13	14	15	16	17	18	19	20	21	22	23	24	25	26	27	28	29	30	31	32	33	34	35	36	37	38	39	40	41	42	43	44	45	46
Ground	A	H	A	H	H	A	H	A	H	A	H	A	H	A	A	H	H	A	H	A	H	A	A	H	H	A	H	A	H	A	A	H	A	H	A	H	H	A	A	H	A	H	H	A	H	A
Result	W	D	L	L	D	D	D	W	W	D	W	L	L	L	L	L	D	W	L	L	L	L	L	L	W	W	W	W	D	W	L	W	L	D	L	L	W	L	L	L	D	L	D	L	L	L
Position	6	6	15	18	18	18	17	15	11	10	9	10	13	15	16	17	19	17	18	20	20	21	21	23	22	21	17	15	16	14	14	13	15	16	16	18	15	17	18	19	18	19	20	22	23	23

Updated to match(es) played on 4 May 2019. Source: Statto.com
A = Away; H = Home; W = Win; D = Draw; L = Loss

==== Matches ====
On 21 June 2018, the League One fixtures for the forthcoming season were announced.

4 August 2018 1	Coventry City	1–2	Scunthorpe United	Coventry
15:00 BST	Andreu 52'	Report	Humphrys 68'; Dales 81'	Stadium: Ricoh Arena; Attendance: 12,964; Referee: Antony Coggins

11 August 2018 2	Scunthorpe United	1–1	Walsall	Scunthorpe
15:00 BST	Novak 48'; Clarke (yellow card) 75'	Report	Dobson (yellow card) 43'; Ismail 64'; Guthrie (yellow card) 67'; Leahy (yellow card) 73'	Stadium: Glanford Park; Attendance: 4,331; Referee: Dean Whitestone

18 August 2018 3	Sunderland	3–0	Scunthorpe United	Sunderland
15:00 BST	Power 22'; Maja 25'; Maguire 42'	Report		Stadium: Stadium of Light; Attendance: 29,876; Referee: Anthony Backhouse

22 August 2018 4	Scunthorpe United	0–5	Fleetwood Town	Scunthorpe
19:45 BST		Report	Evans 16', 18'; Burns 21', 29'; Hunter 56'	Stadium: Glanford Park; Attendance: 3,465; Referee: Carl Boyeson

25 August 2018 5	Scunthorpe United	2–2	Barnsley	Scunthorpe
15:00 BST	Morris 9' (pen.); Burgess 51'	Report	Moore 59'; Cavaré 69'	Stadium: Glanford Park; Attendance: 5,579; Referee: Nick Kinseley

1 September 2018 6	Accrington Stanley	1–1	Scunthorpe United	Accrington
15:00 BST	Conneely 82'	Report	Lund 80'	Stadium: Crown Ground; Attendance: 2,059; Referee: Chris Sarginson

8 September 2018 7	Scunthorpe United	3–3	Rochdale	Scunthorpe
15:00 BST	Novak 2'; Colclough 18'; Goode 54'	Report	Rathbone 52', 66'; Gillam 83'	Stadium: Glanford Park; Attendance: 3,898; Referee: Ross Joyce

5 September 2018 8	AFC Wimbledon	2–3	Scunthorpe United	Norbiton
15:00 BST	Trotter 49'; Appiah 55'	Report	Morris 8', 32'; Ugbo 52'	Stadium: Kingsmeadow; Attendance: 3,885; Referee: Charles Breakspear

22 September 2018 9	Scunthorpe United	1–0	Shrewsbury Town	Scunthorpe
15:00 BST	Novak 55'	Report		Stadium: Glanford Park; Attendance: 3,784; Referee: Andy Haines

29 September 2018 10	Burton Albion	0–0	Scunthorpe United	Burton upon Trent
15:00 BST		Report		Stadium: Pirelli Stadium; Attendance: 2,797; Referee: Peter Wright

2 October 2018 11	Scunthorpe United	5–3	Charlton Athletic	Scunthorpe
19:45 BST	Goode 3'; Borthwick-Jackson 30', 38'; Morris 73' (pen.); Humphrys 90+3'	Report	Taylor 18'; Aribo 22', 69'	Stadium: Glanford Park; Attendance: 3,341; Referee: Darren Drysdale

6 October 2018 12	Luton Town	3–2	Scunthorpe United	Luton
15:00 BST	Cornick 10'; Lee 26'; Justin 85'	Report	Novak 17'; Humphrys 90+2'	Stadium: Kenilworth Road; Attendance: 8,682; Referee: Kevin Johnson

13 October 2018 13	Scunthorpe United	0–2	Peterborough United	Scunthorpe
15:00 BST		Report	Godden 51', 58'; Daniel (yellow card) 82'; Toney (yellow card) 84'; O'Hara (yellow card) 90'	Stadium: Glanford Park; Attendance: 4,566; Referee: Robert Lewis

20 October 2018 14	Wycombe Wanderers	3–2	Scunthorpe United	High Wycombe
15:00 BST	Gape (yellow card) 25', (goal) 27'; Onyedinma 53'; Allsop (red card) 81'; Jacobson (yellow card) 87'; Mackail-Smith 90+4'; Ma-Kalambay (yellow card) 90+9'; Thompson (yellow card) 90+10'	Report	Colclough 1'; Humphrys 7'; Dales (yellow card) 32'; Clarke (yellow card) 52'	Stadium: Adams Park; Referee: Alan Young

23 October 2018 15	Blackpool	1–0	Scunthorpe United	Blackpool
19:45 BST	Gnanduillet 19'	Report		Stadium: Bloomfield Road; Attendance: 2,769; Referee: Thomas Bramall

27 October 2018 16	Scunthorpe United	1–4	Plymouth Argyle	Scunthorpe
15:00 BST	McArdle (yellow card) 17'; Colclough (yellow card) 41'; Novak 49'; Thomas (yellow card) 56'	Report	Ladapo 13'; Canavan 45+1'; J. Grant 57'; Ness (yellow card) 60'; Sarcevic 90+4'	Stadium: Glanford Park; Attendance: 3,508; Referee: Scott Oldham

3 November 2018 17	Scunthorpe United	3–3	Oxford United	Scunthorpe
15:00 GMT	Lund (yellow card) 17'; Goode (yellow card) 26', (goal) 66'; Perch (yellow card) 57'; Clarke 60'; Thomas 64'	Report	Henry 8'; Dickie (yellow card) 42'; Brannagan 50', (yellow card) 63'; Nelson 55'; Hanson (yellow card) 87'; McMahon (yellow card) 90'; Mackie (yellow card) 90'	Stadium: Glanford Park; Attendance: 3,665; Referee: Paul Marsden

17 November 2018 18	Bristol Rovers	1–2	Scunthorpe United	Horfield
15:00 GMT	Sercombe 45+2'	Report	Novak 15'; Lund 78'	Stadium: Memorial Stadium; Attendance: 8,003; Referee: Lee Collins

24 November 2018 19	Scunthorpe United	1–2	Portsmouth	Scunthorpe
15:00 GMT	Novak 60'	Report	Naylor 34'; Evans 40'	Stadium: Glanford Park; Attendance: 4,365; Referee: Martin Coy

27 November 2018 20	Southend United	2–0	Scunthorpe United	Southend-on-Sea
19:45 GMT	Dieng 8'; Mantom 80'	Report	Perch (red card) 38'	Stadium: Roots Hall; Attendance: 5,110; Referee: Trevor Kettle

8 December 2018 21	Scunthorpe United	0–2	Gillingham	Scunthorpe
15:00 GMT		Report	Eaves 54'; Parrett 56'	Stadium: Glanford Park; Attendance: 3,054; Referee: Graham Salisbury

15 December 2018 22	Doncaster Rovers	3–0	Scunthorpe United	Doncaster
12:15 GMT	Whiteman 6'; Kane 10'; Marquis 85'	Report		Stadium: Keepmoat Stadium; Attendance: 7,969; Referee: Andy Woolmer

22 December 2018 23	Bradford City	2–0	Scunthorpe United	Bradford
15:00 GMT	Payne 10'; Doyle 27', (yellow card) 62'; Chicksen (yellow card) 29'	Report	McArdle (yellow card) 16'; Alnwick (yellow card) 25'; Clarke (yellow card) 61'; Burgess (red card) 63'	Stadium: Valley Parade; Attendance: 16,130; Referee: Carl Boyeson

26 December 2018 24	Scunthorpe United	0–2	Luton Town	Scunthorpe
15:00 GMT	Perch (yellow card) 71'	Report	Shinnie 37'; Cornick 50'; Collins (yellow card) 89'	Stadium: Glanford Park; Attendance: 4,050; Referee: Martin Coy

29 December 2018 25	Scunthorpe United	1–0	Wycombe Wanderers	Scunthorpe
15:00 GMT	Wootton 8'; Borthwick-Jackson (yellow card) 44'; Ben El-Mhanni (yellow card) 50'; Novak (yellow card) 90+6'	Report	Samuel (yellow card) 36'; Thompson (yellow card) 84'	Stadium: Glanford Park; Attendance: 3,489; Referee: Darren Drysdale

1 January 2019 26	Peterborough United	0–2	Scunthorpe United	Peterborough
15:00 GMT	Toney (yellow card) 56'; Maddison (yellow card) 85'	Report	Novak 5', 57' (yellow card) 39'; Alnwick (yellow card) 59'; Wootton (yellow card) 66'; Perch (yellow card) 80'; Borthwick-Jackson (yellow card) 82'	Stadium: London Road Stadium; Attendance: 6,974; Referee: Ollie Yates

5 January 2019 27	Scunthorpe United	2–1	Coventry City	Scunthorpe
15:00 GMT	Perch 67'; Sutton 74' (yellow card) 81'	Report	Chaplin 78'; Bayliss (yellow card) 82'	Stadium: Glanford Park; Attendance: 4,692; Referee: Eddie Ilderton

12 January 2019 28	Walsall	1–2	Scunthorpe United	Walsall
15:00 GMT	Gordon (yellow card) 41'; Devlin 53'; Leahy (yellow card) 75'	Report	Ojo 12'; Perch (yellow card) 43'; Novak 68'	Stadium: Bescot Stadium; Attendance: 3,984; Referee: Matt Donohue

19 January 2019 29	Scunthorpe United	1–1	Sunderland	Scunthorpe
15:00 GMT	Hammill 87'	Report	Maja 59'	Stadium: Glanford Park; Attendance: 7,263; Referee: Craig Hicks

26 January 2019 30	Fleetwood Town	0–1	Scunthorpe United	Fleetwood
15:00 GMT	Wallace (yellow card) 71'; Hunter (yellow card) 90+1'	Report	Eastham 76' (o.g.)	Stadium: Highbury Stadium; Attendance: 2,637; Referee: Seb Stockbridge

2 February 2019 31	Barnsley	2–0	Scunthorpe United	Barnsley
15:00 GMT	Mowatt 16'; Woodrow (yellow card) 28'; McGeehan 41'; Brown (yellow card) 70'; Bähre (yellow card) 90+3'	Report	Perch (yellow card) 35'; McMahon (yellow card) 89'	Stadium: Oakwell; Attendance: 12,150; Referee: Andy Haines

9 February 2019 32	Scunthorpe United	2–0	Accrington Stanley	Scunthorpe
15:00 GMT	Wootton 13' (yellow card) 45+1' van Veen 42' (yellow card) 54'; Burgess (yellow card) 83'	Report	Donacien (yellow card) 51'; Barlaser (yellow card) 68'	Stadium: Glanford Park; Attendance: 4,824; Referee: Antony Coggins

16 February 2019 33	Gillingham	1–0	Scunthorpe United	Gillingham
15:00 GMT	Byrne 30'; Reilly (yellow card) 90+2'	Report	van Veen (yellow card) 50'	Stadium: Priestfield Stadium; Attendance: 4,170; Referee: Lee Swabey

23 February 2019 34	Scunthorpe United	1–1	Doncaster Rovers	Scunthorpe
13:00 GMT	Sutton (yellow card) 12'; McArdle (yellow card) 61'; Wootton 69'	Report	Wilks 25'; Downing (yellow card) 63'	Stadium: Glanford Park; Attendance: 6,255; Referee: John Brooks

2 March 2019 35	Oxford United	2–1	Scunthorpe United	Oxford
15:00 GMT	Sinclair 65', 80'	Report	Sutton (yellow card) 53'; Burgess (yellow card) 55'; Thomas 90+2'	Stadium: Kassam Stadium; Attendance: 6,237; Referee: Michael Salisbury

9 March 2019 36	Scunthorpe United	0–1	Bristol Rovers	Scunthorpe
15:00 GMT	Sutton (yellow card) 42'; McMahon (yellow card) 90'	Report	Clarke-Harris 35'; Upson (yellow card) 70'; Ogogo (yellow card) 87'; Kelly (yellow card) 90'; Craig (yellow card) 90+4'	Stadium: Glanford Park; Attendance: 3,877; Referee: Trevor Kettle

12 March 2019 37	Scunthorpe United	4–1	Southend United	Scunthorpe
19:45 GMT	Pearce 23'; Lewis (yellow card) 65'; McMahon 68' van Veen (yellow card) 71'; Thomas 73'; Perch 77'	Report	Cox 3'; Demetriou (yellow card) 66'	Stadium: Glanford Park; Attendance: 3,233; Referee: Ben Toner

16 March 2019 38	Portsmouth	2–0	Scunthorpe United	Portsmouth
15:00 GMT	Bogle 71'; Lowe 87'; Evans (yellow card) 90+2'	Report	Perch (yellow card) 64'	Stadium: Fratton Park; Attendance: 17,308; Referee: Peter Wright

23 March 2019 39	Rochdale	3–1	Scunthorpe United	Rochdale
15:00 GMT	Wilbraham 14', 60'; Ntlhe 51'	Report	Hallam 16'; McGahey (yellow card) 27'; McMahon (yellow card) 42'	Stadium: Spotland Stadium; Attendance: 3,361; Referee: Eddie Ilderton

30 March 2019 40	Scunthorpe United	1–2	AFC Wimbledon	Scunthorpe
15:00 GMT	Alnwick (yellow card) 10'; Webster (yellow card) 22'; Perch (yellow card) 25'; Burgess (yellow card) 45+1'; Novak 78' (yellow card) 90+1'; Hallam (yellow card) 82'	Report	Pigott (penalty missed) 11'; Hanson 23', 29'; Wordsworth (yellow card) 65'; Hartigan (yellow card) 90+3'	Stadium: Glanford Park; Attendance: 3,955; Referee: Matt Donohue

6 April 2019 41	Shrewsbury Town	1–1	Scunthorpe United	Shrewsbury
15:00 BST	Hammill 84' (o.g.)	Report	Wootton 22'; Perch (yellow card) 56'	Stadium: New Meadow; Attendance: 6,419; Referee: Paul Marsden

13 April 2019 42	Scunthorpe United	0–3	Burton Albion	Scunthorpe
15:00 BST	Perch (yellow card) 14'	Report	Wallace 39'; Quinn (yellow card) 52'; Akins 68'; Boyce 74'	Stadium: Glanford Park; Attendance: 3,698; Referee: Graham Salisbury

19 April 2019 43	Scunthorpe United	0–0	Blackpool	Scunthorpe
15:00 BST		Report		Stadium: Glanford Park; Attendance: 3,795; Referee: Martin Coy

22 April 2019 44	Charlton Athletic	4–0	Scunthorpe United	Charlton
15:00 BST	Dijksteel 24'; Aribo 57'; Vetokele 63'; Taylor 66'	Report	Morris (yellow card) 68'	Stadium: The Valley; Attendance: 11,973; Referee: Brett Huxtable

27 April 2019 45	Scunthorpe United	2–3	Bradford City	Scunthorpe
15:00 BST	Lund (yellow card) 60'; Wootton 64'; Novak 80'	Report	Clarke 2'; Anderson 12'; Doyle 15'; Colville (yellow card) 53'; Mellor (yellow card) 58'	Stadium: Glanford Park; Attendance: 4,528; Referee: Sebastian Stockbridge

4 May 2019 46	Plymouth Argyle	3–2	Scunthorpe United	Plymouth
17:30 BST	Jones 8'; Fox (yellow card) 18'; Ladapo 35'; Edwards (yellow card) 36'; Carey (yellow card) 45+4' (goal) 70'; Songo'o (yellow card) 77'	Report	Wootton (yellow card) 11' (goal) 42'; Webster (yellow card) 19'; Perch (yellow card) 21'; Morris 60'; Hammill (yellow card) 74'; Lund (yellow card) 78'	Stadium: Home Park; Attendance: 11,907; Referee: Roger East

=== FA Cup ===
The first round draw was made live on BBC by Dennis Wise and Dion Dublin on 22 October. The draw for the second round was made live on BBC and BT by Mark Schwarzer and Glenn Murray on 12 November.

10 November 2018 First round	Scunthorpe United	2–1	Burton Albion	Scunthorpe
15:00 GMT	Perch 16'; Novak 33'	Report	Boyce 79'	Stadium: Glanford Park; Attendance: 2,260; Referee: Andy Haines

2 December 2018 Second round	Shrewsbury Town	1–0	Scunthorpe United	Shrewsbury
14:00 GMT	Amadi-Holloway 35'	Report		Stadium: New Meadow; Attendance: 3,427; Referee: Neil Hair

=== EFL Cup ===
On 15 June 2018, the draw for the first round was made in Vietnam.

14 August 2018 First round	Scunthorpe United	1–2	Doncaster Rovers	Scunthorpe
19:45 BST	Perch (yellow card) 33'; Clarke (yellow card) HT; Humphrys 90+2'	Report	Whiteman (yellow card) 26'; Wilks 36'; Butler (yellow card) HT; Andrew 56'	Stadium: Glanford Park; Attendance: 3,272; Referee: Geoff Eltringham

=== EFL Trophy ===
On 13 July 2018, the initial group stage draw bar the U21 invited clubs was announced.

Pos	Lge	Team	Pld	W	PW	PL	L	GF	GA	GD	Pts	Qualification
1	L2	Mansfield Town	3	3	0	0	0	7	4	+3	9	Round 2
2	L2	Lincoln City	3	0	1	1	1	4	5	−1	3	Round 2
3	L1	Scunthorpe United	3	0	1	1	1	3	4	−1	3	
4	ACA	Wolverhampton Wanderers U21	3	0	1	1	1	3	4	−1	3	

Source: EFL.com

4 September 2018 Group stages	Scunthorpe United	0–0 (4–2 p)	Wolverhampton Wanderers U21	Scunthorpe
19:45 BST		Report		Stadium: Glanford Park; Attendance: 874; Referee: Thomas Bramall
	Penalties
	Goode (penalty missed); Lund (penalty scored); Colclough (penalty scored); Horsfield (penalty scored); Burgess (penalty scored)		Pote (penalty missed); Diallo (penalty missed); Ennis (penalty scored); Kilman (penalty scored)

9 October 2018 Group stages	Scunthorpe United	1–1 (1–3 p)	Lincoln City	Scunthorpe
19:45 BST	Colclough 56'	Report	Anderson 84'; Wilson (red card) 90+2'	Stadium: Glanford Park; Attendance: 1,878
	Penalties
	Novak (penalty missed); Goode (penalty scored); Lund (penalty missed); Humphrys (penalty missed)		Pett (penalty scored); Rhead (penalty scored); Frecklington (penalty scored); Andrade (penalty missed)

13 November 2018 Group stages	Mansfield Town	3–2	Scunthorpe United	Mansfield
19:45 GMT	Blake 21'; Butcher 55'; Elsnik 90'	Report	El-Mhanni 75'; Dales 90'	Stadium: Field Mill; Attendance: 928

== Squad ==
No.	Name	Pos.	Nat.	Place of Birth	Age	Apps	Goals	Signed from	Date Signed	Fee	Contract
Goalkeepers
13	Rory Watson	GK	(England)	York	30	16	0	Hull City	31 January 2017	Free	2020
25	Jak Alnwick	GK	(England)	Hexham	33	43	0	Rangers	31 August 2018	Loan	2019
27	Jonathan Flatt	GK	(England)	Wolverhampton	32	4	0	Wolverhampton Wanderers	10 July 2018	Free	2019
Defenders
2	Jordan Clarke	RB	(England)	Coventry	34	138	3	Coventry City	10 January 2015	Undisclosed	2019
3	Cameron Borthwick-Jackson	LB	(England)	Manchester	29	32	2	Manchester United	28 July 2018	Loan	2019
4	Tony McMahon	LB	(England)	Bishop Auckland	40	14	1	Oxford United	3 January 2019	Loan	2019
5	Byron Webster	CB	(England)	Sherburn-in-Elmet	39	9	0	Millwall	4 January 2019	Free	2019
16	Tom Pearce	LB	(England)	Ormskirk	28	8	1	Leeds United	31 January 2019	Loan	2019
21	Cameron Burgess	CB	(Australia)	Aberdeen	31	73	3	Fulham	1 July 2017	Undisclosed	2020
23	Rory McArdle	CB	(England)	Sheffield	39	86	1	Bradford City	1 July 2017	Free	2020
26	Harrison McGahey	CB	(England)	Preston	31	10	0	Rochdale	4 January 2019	Undisclosed	2021
32	Jacob Bedeau	CB	(England)	Waltham Forest	26	0	0	Aston Villa	31 January 2019	Undisclosed	2021
33	Lewis Butroid	LB	(England)	Gainsborough	28	22	0	Academy	26 January 2017	Trainee	2019
Midfielders
6	Funso Ojo	DM	(Belgium)	Antwerp	35	87	3	Willem II	18 July 2017	Free	2020
7	Matty Lund	CM	(Northern Ireland)	Manchester	35	27	2	Burton Albion	3 August 2018	Undisclosed	2020
11	Josh Morris	LM	(England)	Preston	35	125	37	Bradford City	1 July 2016	Free	2019
14	James Perch	DM/RB	(England)	Mansfield	41	44	3	Queens Park Rangers	1 August 2018	Free	2020
15	Clayton Lewis	AM	(New Zealand)	Wellington	29	23	1	Auckland City FC	28 September 2017	Free	2019
19	Yasin Ben El-Mhanni	RW	(England)	Chelsea	31	7	1	Free Agent	26 October 2018	Free	2019
22	Levi Sutton	CM/RB	(England)	Scunthorpe	30	49	1	Academy	2 June 2015	Trainee	2019
30	Jordan Hallam	LW	(England)	Sheffield	28	7	1	Sheffield United	25 January 2019	Free	2020
47	Adam Hammill	RM	(England)	Liverpool	38	15	1	St. Mirren	3 January 2019	Undisclosed	2020
Forwards
10	Kevin van Veen	CF	(Netherlands)	Eindhoven	35	129	24	Northampton Town	2 January 2019	Undisclosed	2021
17	Lee Novak	CF	(England)	Newcastle upon Tyne	38	82	19	Charlton Athletic	31 August 2017	Free	2020
18	George Thomas	CF/RW	(Wales) (England)	Leicester	29	38	3	Leicester City	3 August 2018	Loan	2019
24	Olufela Olomola	CF	(England)	London	29	6	0	Southampton	1 July 2018	Free	2021
29	Kyle Wootton	CF	(England)	Epworth	30	73	11	Academy	1 August 2014	Trainee	2021
49	Ryan Colclough	LW	(England)	Stoke-on-Trent	31	21	3	Wigan Athletic	9 August 2018	Undisclosed	2021
On Loan
8	James Horsfield	RB	(England)	Stockport	31	15	0	NAC Breda	17 July 2018	Free	2020
12	Andy Dales	CF	(England)	Derby	32	24	2	Mickleover Sports	1 July 2018	Undisclosed	2020
20	Charlie Goode	CB	(England)	Watford	31	84	6	Hendon	10 June 2015	Free	2019
31	Adam Kelsey	GK	(England)	Kingston upon Hull	35	0	0	Academy	26 January 2017	Trainee	2020

=== Statistics ===
As of 5 May 2019

No.	Pos	Nat	Player	Total		League One		FA Cup		League Cup		League Trophy	
No.	Pos	Nat	Player	Apps	Goals	Apps	Goals	Apps	Goals	Apps	Goals	Apps	Goals
2	DF	(England) ENG	Jordan Clarke	17	1	14+0	1	1+0	0	1+0	0	1+0	0
3	DF	(England) ENG	Cameron Borthwick-Jackson	32	2	28+0	2	1+0	0	1+0	0	1+1	0
4	DF	(England) ENG	Tony McMahon	14	1	14+0	1	0+0	0	0+0	0	0+0	0
5	DF	(England) ENG	Byron Webster	9	0	8+1	0	0+0	0	0+0	0	0+0	0
6	MF	(Belgium) BEL	Funso Ojo	38	1	35+2	1	0+0	0	0+0	0	1+0	0
7	MF	(Northern Ireland) NIR	Matty Lund	27	2	16+6	2	2+0	0	1+0	0	2+0	0
10	FW	(Netherlands) NED	Kevin van Veen	13	1	6+7	1	0+0	0	0+0	0	0+0	0
11	MF	(England) ENG	Josh Morris	22	5	17+2	5	1+0	0	1+0	0	1+0	0
13	GK	(England) ENG	Rory Watson	6	0	5+0	0	0+0	0	1+0	0	0+0	0
14	MF	(England) ENG	James Perch	44	3	38+2	2	1+0	1	1+0	0	1+1	0
15	MF	(New Zealand) NZL	Clayton Lewis	15	0	3+10	0	0+0	0	0+0	0	2+0	0
16	DF	(England) ENG	Tom Pearce	8	1	8+0	1	0+0	0	0+0	0	0+0	0
17	FW	(England) ENG	Lee Novak	45	13	37+4	12	2+0	1	1+0	0	0+1	0
18	FW	(Wales) WAL	George Thomas	38	3	26+9	3	2+0	0	1+0	0	0+0	0
19	MF	(England) ENG	Yasin Ben El-Mhanni	7	1	2+3	0	0+1	0	0+0	0	1+0	1
21	DF	(Australia) AUS	Cameron Burgess	40	1	34+2	1	2+0	0	0+0	0	2+0	0
22	MF	(England) ENG	Levi Sutton	18	1	15+2	1	0+0	0	0+0	0	1+0	0
23	MF	(England) ENG	Rory McArdle	41	0	35+1	0	2+0	0	1+0	0	2+0	0
24	FW	(England) ENG	Olufela Olomola	6	0	2+4	0	0+0	0	0+0	0	0+0	0
25	GK	(England) ENG	Jak Alnwick	43	0	41+0	0	2+0	0	0+0	0	0+0	0
26	DF	(England) ENG	Harrison McGahey	10	0	8+2	0	0+0	0	0+0	0	0+0	0
27	GK	(England) ENG	Jonathan Flatt	4	0	0+1	0	0+0	0	0+0	0	3+0	0
28	MF	(England) ENG	George Hornshaw	1	0	0+0	0	0+0	0	0+0	0	0+1	0
29	FW	(England) ENG	Kyle Wootton	28	6	18+6	6	1+1	0	0+0	0	1+1	0
30	MF	(England) ENG	Jordan Hallam	7	1	4+3	1	0+0	0	0+0	0	0+0	0
33	DF	(England) ENG	Lewis Butroid	10	0	2+4	0	1+0	0	0+1	0	2+0	0
40	MF	(England) ENG	Tom Pugh	1	0	0+0	0	0+0	0	0+0	0	0+1	0
47	MF	(England) ENG	Adam Hammill	15	1	10+5	1	0+0	0	0+0	0	0+0	0
49	FW	(England) ENG	Ryan Colclough	21	3	12+5	2	1+0	0	1+0	0	2+0	1
Players out on loan:
8	DF	(England) ENG	James Horsfield	15	0	5+6	0	0+1	0	0+1	0	2+0	0
12	FW	(England) ENG	Andy Dales	25	2	11+9	1	1+1	0	0+0	0	3+0	1
20	DF	(England) ENG	Charlie Goode	24	3	20+0	3	1+0	0	1+0	0	2+0	0
Players that left the club during the season:
9	FW	(England) ENG	Ike Ugbo	15	1	7+7	1	1+0	0	0+0	0	0+0	0
10	FW	(England) ENG	Stephen Humphrys	19	4	9+6	3	0+0	0	0+1	1	3+0	0
19	MF	(United States) USA	Duane Holmes	1	0	0+1	0	0+0	0	0+0	0	0+0	0

=== Goals record ===
As of 5 May 2019

Rank	No.	Nat.	Po.	Name	League One	FA Cup	League Cup	League Trophy	Total
1	17	(England)	CF	Lee Novak	12	1	0	0	13
2	29	(England)	CF	Kyle Wootton	6	0	0	0	6
3	~~10~~	(England)	CF	Stephen Humphrys	4	0	1	0	5
3	11	(England)	LM	Josh Morris	5	0	0	0	5
5	14	(England)	DM	James Perch	2	1	0	0	3
5	18	(Wales)	CF	George Thomas	3	0	0	0	3
5	20	(England)	CB	Charlie Goode	3	0	0	0	3
5	49	(England)	LW	Ryan Colclough	2	0	0	1	3
9	3	(England)	LB	Cameron Borthwick-Jackson	2	0	0	0	2
9	7	(Northern Ireland)	CM	Matty Lund	2	0	0	0	2
9	12	(England)	LW	Andy Dales	1	0	0	1	2
12	2	(England)	RB	Jordan Clarke	1	0	0	0	1
12	4	(England)	RB	Tony McMahon	1	0	0	0	1
12	6	(Belgium)	CM	Funso Ojo	1	0	0	0	1
12	~~9~~	(England)	CF	Ike Ugbo	1	0	0	0	1
12	10	(Netherlands)	CF	Kevin van Veen	1	0	0	0	1
12	16	(England)	LB	Tom Pearce	1	0	0	0	1
12	19	(England)	RW	Yasin Ben El-Mhanni	0	0	0	1	1
12	21	(Australia)	CB	Cameron Burgess	1	0	0	0	1
12	22	(England)	CM	Levi Sutton	1	0	0	0	1
12	30	(England)	LW	Jordan Hallam	1	0	0	0	1
12	47	(England)	LM	Adam Hammill	1	0	0	0	1
Total					52	2	1	3	58

=== Disciplinary record ===
As of 5 May 2019

Rank	No.	Nat.	Po.	Name	League One			FA Cup			League Cup			League Trophy			Total		
Rank	No.	Nat.	Po.	Name	Yellow card	(yellow card) (yellow-red card)	Red card	Yellow card	(yellow card) (yellow-red card)	Red card	Yellow card	(yellow card) (yellow-red card)	Red card	Yellow card	(yellow card) (yellow-red card)	Red card	Yellow card	(yellow card) (yellow-red card)	Red card
1	14	(England)	DM	James Perch	15	1	0	0	0	0	1	0	0	0	0	0	16	1	0
2	7	(Northern Ireland)	CM	Matty Lund	9	0	0	2	0	0	0	0	0	1	0	0	12	0	0
3	17	(England)	CF	Lee Novak	7	0	0	0	0	0	0	0	0	0	0	0	7	0	0
4	2	(England)	RB	Jordan Clarke	4	0	0	0	0	0	1	0	0	0	0	0	5	0	0
4	3	(England)	LB	Cameron Borthwick-Jackson	5	0	0	0	0	0	0	0	0	0	0	0	5	0	0
4	21	(Australia)	CB	Cameron Burgess	4	0	0	0	0	0	0	0	0	1	0	0	5	0	0
7	22	(England)	CM	Levi Sutton	4	0	0	0	0	0	0	0	0	0	0	0	4	0	0
7	23	(England)	CB	Rory McArdle	4	0	0	0	0	0	0	0	0	0	0	0	4	0	0
9	4	(England)	RB	Tony McMahon	3	0	0	0	0	0	0	0	0	0	0	0	3	0	0
9	10	(Netherlands)	CF	Kevin van Veen	3	0	0	0	0	0	0	0	0	0	0	0	3	0	0
9	11	(England)	LM	Josh Morris	3	0	0	0	0	0	0	0	0	0	0	0	3	0	0
9	12	(England)	LW	Andy Dales	3	0	0	0	0	0	0	0	0	0	0	0	3	0	0
9	20	(England)	CB	Charlie Goode	3	0	0	0	0	0	0	0	0	0	0	0	3	0	0
9	29	(England)	CF	Kyle Wootton	3	0	0	0	0	0	0	0	0	0	0	0	3	0	0
14	5	(England)	CB	Byron Webster	2	0	0	0	0	0	0	0	0	0	0	0	2	0	0
14	18	(Wales)	CF	George Thomas	2	0	0	0	0	0	0	0	0	0	0	0	2	0	0
14	25	(England)	GK	Jak Alnwick	2	0	0	0	0	0	0	0	0	0	0	0	2	0	0
14	33	(England)	LB	Lewis Butroid	1	0	0	0	0	0	0	0	0	1	0	0	2	0	0
14	49	(England)	LW	Ryan Colclough	2	0	0	0	0	0	0	0	0	0	0	0	2	0	0
19	6	(Belgium)	CM	Funso Ojo	1	0	0	0	0	0	0	0	0	0	0	0	1	0	0
19	~~10~~	(England)	CF	Stephen Humphrys	1	0	0	0	0	0	0	0	0	0	0	0	1	0	0
19	15	(New Zealand)	CM	Clayton Lewis	1	0	0	0	0	0	0	0	0	0	0	0	1	0	0
19	19	(England)	RM	Yasin Ben El-Mhanni	1	0	0	0	0	0	0	0	0	0	0	0	1	0	0
19	26	(England)	CB	Harrison McGahey	1	0	0	0	0	0	0	0	0	0	0	0	1	0	0
19	30	(England)	LW	Jordan Hallam	1	0	0	0	0	0	0	0	0	0	0	0	1	0	0
19	47	(England)	LM	Adam Hammill	1	0	0	0	0	0	0	0	0	0	0	0	1	0	0
Total					87	1	0	2	0	0	2	0	0	3	0	0	94	1	0

== Transfers ==
=== Transfers in ===
Date	Position	Nationality	Name	From	Fee	Ref.
1 July 2018	ST	(England)	Andy Dales	Mickleover Sports	Undisclosed	
1 July 2018	CF	(England)	Olufela Olomola	Southampton	Free transfer	
10 July 2018	GK	(England)	Jonathan Flatt	Wolverhampton Wanderers	Free transfer	
17 July 2018	RB	(England)	James Horsfield	(Netherlands) NAC Breda	Free transfer	
1 August 2018	RB	(England)	James Perch	Queens Park Rangers	Free transfer	
3 August 2018	CM	(Northern Ireland)	Matty Lund	Burton Albion	Undisclosed	
9 August 2018	LW	(England)	Ryan Colclough	Wigan Athletic	Undisclosed	
26 October 2018	RW	(England)	Yasin Ben El-Mhanni	Newcastle United	Free transfer	
2 January 2019	CF	(Netherlands)	Kevin van Veen	Northampton Town	Undisclosed	
3 January 2019	RW	(England)	Adam Hammill	(Scotland) St Mirren	Free transfer	
4 January 2019	CB	(England)	Harrison McGahey	Rochdale	Undisclosed	
4 January 2019	CB	(England)	Byron Webster	Millwall	Free transfer	
25 January 2019	LW	(England)	Jordan Hallam	Sheffield United	Free transfer	
31 January 2019	CB	(England)	Jacob Bedeau	Aston Villa	Free transfer	
4 April 2019	RB	(England)	Jai Rowe	Barwell	£1.00	

=== Transfers out ===
Date	Position	Nationality	Name	To	Fee	Ref.
1 July 2018	CM	(England)	Neal Bishop	Mansfield Town	Released	
1 July 2018	CM	(Wales)	Andrew Crofts	(Wales) Newport County	Released	
1 July 2018	LM	(England)	Jack Dyche	Guiseley	Released	
1 July 2018	CF	(England)	Tom Hopper	Southend United	Released	
1 July 2018	CM	(England)	Sam Mantom	Southend United	Undisclosed	
1 July 2018	CF	(England)	Jonny Margetts	Boston United	Released	
1 July 2018	CB	(Scotland)	Murray Wallace	Millwall	Undisclosed	
1 July 2018	SS	(England)	Luke Williams	Hartlepool United	Released	
2 July 2018	LM	(England)	Hakeeb Adelakun	Bristol City	Free transfer	
28 July 2018	LB	(England)	Conor Townsend	West Bromwich Albion	Undisclosed	
9 August 2018	RM	(United States)	Duane Holmes	Derby County	Undisclosed	
31 January 2019	GK	(Scotland)	Matt Gilks	Lincoln City	Free transfer	

=== Loans in ===
Start date	Position	Nationality	Name	From	End date	Ref.
6 July 2018	CF	(England)	Stephen Humphrys	Fulham	3 January 2019	
28 July 2018	LB	(England)	Cameron Borthwick-Jackson	Manchester United	31 May 2019	
3 August 2018	RW	(Wales)	George Thomas	Leicester City	31 May 2019	
30 August 2018	GK	(England)	Jak Alnwick	(Scotland) Rangers	January 2019	
30 August 2018	CF	(England)	Ike Ugbo	Chelsea	January 2019	
3 January 2019	RB	(England)	Tony McMahon	Oxford United	31 May 2019	
31 January 2019	LB	(England)	Tom Pearce	Leeds United	31 May 2019	

=== Loans out ===
Start date	Position	Nationality	Name	To	End date	Ref.
31 August 2018	CF	(England)	Olufela Olomola	Yeovil Town	January 2019	
31 August 2018	CM	(England)	Levi Sutton	Harrogate Town	November 2018	
27 September 2018	GK	(England)	Adam Kelsey	Sheffield	October 2018	
28 September 2018	CM	(England)	George Hornshaw	Farsley Celtic	October 2018	
29 September 2018	CF	(England)	Kyle Wootton	FC Halifax Town	November 2018	
16 November 2018	GK	(England)	Adam Kelsey	Sheffield	1 January 2019	
15 January 2019	LW	(England)	Andy Dales	(Scotland) Dundee	31 May 2019	
24 January 2019	RB	(England)	James Horsfield	(Scotland) Dundee	31 May 2019	
25 January 2019	GK	(England)	Adam Kelsey	Stocksbridge Park Steels	February 2019	
31 January 2019	CB	(England)	Charlie Goode	Northampton Town	31 May 2019	
22 February 2019	MF	(England)	George Hornshaw	Gainsborough Trinity	March 2019	
