= James Horsfield =

English footballer

Personal information
- Full name: James Horsfield
- Date of birth: 21 September 1995 (age 31)
- Place of birth: Hazel Grove, Stockport, England
- Position: Right back

Youth career
- 2002–2015: Manchester City

Senior career*
| Years | Team | Apps | (Gls) |
| 2015–2017 | Manchester City | 0 | (0) |
| 2015 | → Doncaster Rovers (loan) | 2 | (0) |
| 2017 | → NAC Breda (loan) | 16 | (1) |
| 2017–2018 | NAC Breda | 10 | (0) |
| 2018–2020 | Scunthorpe United | 11 | (0) |
| 2019 | → Dundee (loan) | 11 | (0) |
| 2019 | → Wrexham (loan) | 3 | (0) |
| 2020–2021 | Wrexham | 16 | (0) |
| 2021–2022 | Chester | 14 | (1) |
| Total | | 83 | (2) |
- * Club domestic league appearances and goals as of 17:00, 5 March 2022 (UTC)

James Horsfield (born 21 September 1995) is an English former professional footballer who played as a right back. He is a player agent.

== Career ==
=== Manchester City ===
Horsfield came through Manchester City's youth system, signing on as a first year scholar in July 2012, having been at the club for ten years. In July 2015 he scored a penalty against Roma in the International Champions Cup in Melbourne. In 2017 Horsfield signed a one-year contract extension, extending his deal at the club to June 2018.

==== Doncaster Rovers (loan) ====
On 28 September 2015, Horsfield signed for Doncaster Rovers on a 28-day emergency loan deal. He made his debut a day later. He made a total of 3 appearances and returned to City.

==== NAC Breda (loan) ====
On 17 January 2017, Horsfield was sent on loan to Dutch Eerste Divisie side NAC Breda for the rest of the season. He made his debut on 3 February, against Den Bosch. On 13 March, Horsfield scored his first senior goal, in a 2–0 win over Fortuna Sittard.

=== NAC Breda ===
Following his loan period, Horsfield signed permanently for NAC Breda on 24 July 2017, signing a three-year contract at the Eredivisie club.

=== Scunthorpe United ===
On 17 July 2018, Horsfield signed for EFL League One club Scunthorpe United on a two-year contract. He made his league debut in the 2–1 away victory against Coventry City.

Horsfield was loaned to Dundee in January 2019.

Horsfield was again loaned out in October 2019, this time to Wrexham.

=== Wrexham ===
Horsfield would return to Wrexham on 15 September 2020, signing a one-year deal after a successful trial with the club.

=== Chester ===
On 17 September 2021, Horsfield signed a short-term deal with National League North side Chester.

== Career statistics ==
As of 16 June 2019

Appearances and goals by club, season and competition
| Club | Season | League | | | National Cup | | League Cup | | Other | | Total | |
| Club | Season | Division | Apps | Goals | Apps | Goals | Apps | Goals | Apps | Goals | Apps | Goals |
|---|---|---|---|---|---|---|---|---|---|---|---|---|
| Manchester City | 2015–16 | Premier League | 0 | 0 | 0 | 0 | 0 | 0 | 0 | 0 | 0 | 0 |
| Manchester City | 2016–17 | Premier League | 0 | 0 | 0 | 0 | 0 | 0 | 0 | 0 | 0 | 0 |
| Manchester City | Total | | 0 | 0 | 0 | 0 | 0 | 0 | 0 | 0 | 0 | 0 |
| Doncaster (loan) | 2015–16 | League One | 2 | 0 | 0 | 0 | 0 | 0 | 1 (Note: Appearance in the Football League Trophy) | 0 | 3 | 0 |
| NAC Breda (loan) | 2016–17 | Eerste Divisie | 16 | 1 | 0 | 0 | — | | 4 (Note: Appearances in the Eerste Divisie promotion play-offs) | 0 | 20 | 1 |
| NAC Breda | 2017–18 | Eredivisie | 7 | 0 | 0 | 0 | — | | 0 | 0 | 7 | 0 |
| Scunthorpe United | 2018–19 | League One | 11 | 0 | 1 | 0 | 1 | 0 | 2 (Note: Appearances in the EFL Trophy) | 0 | 15 | 0 |
| Dundee (loan) | 2018–19 | Scottish Premiership | 11 | 0 | 0 | 0 | 0 | 0 | 0 | 0 | 11 | 0 |
| Career Total | | | 47 | 1 | 1 | 0 | 1 | 0 | 7 | 0 | 56 | 1 |
