= Yasin Ben El-Mhanni =

English-Moroccan footballer

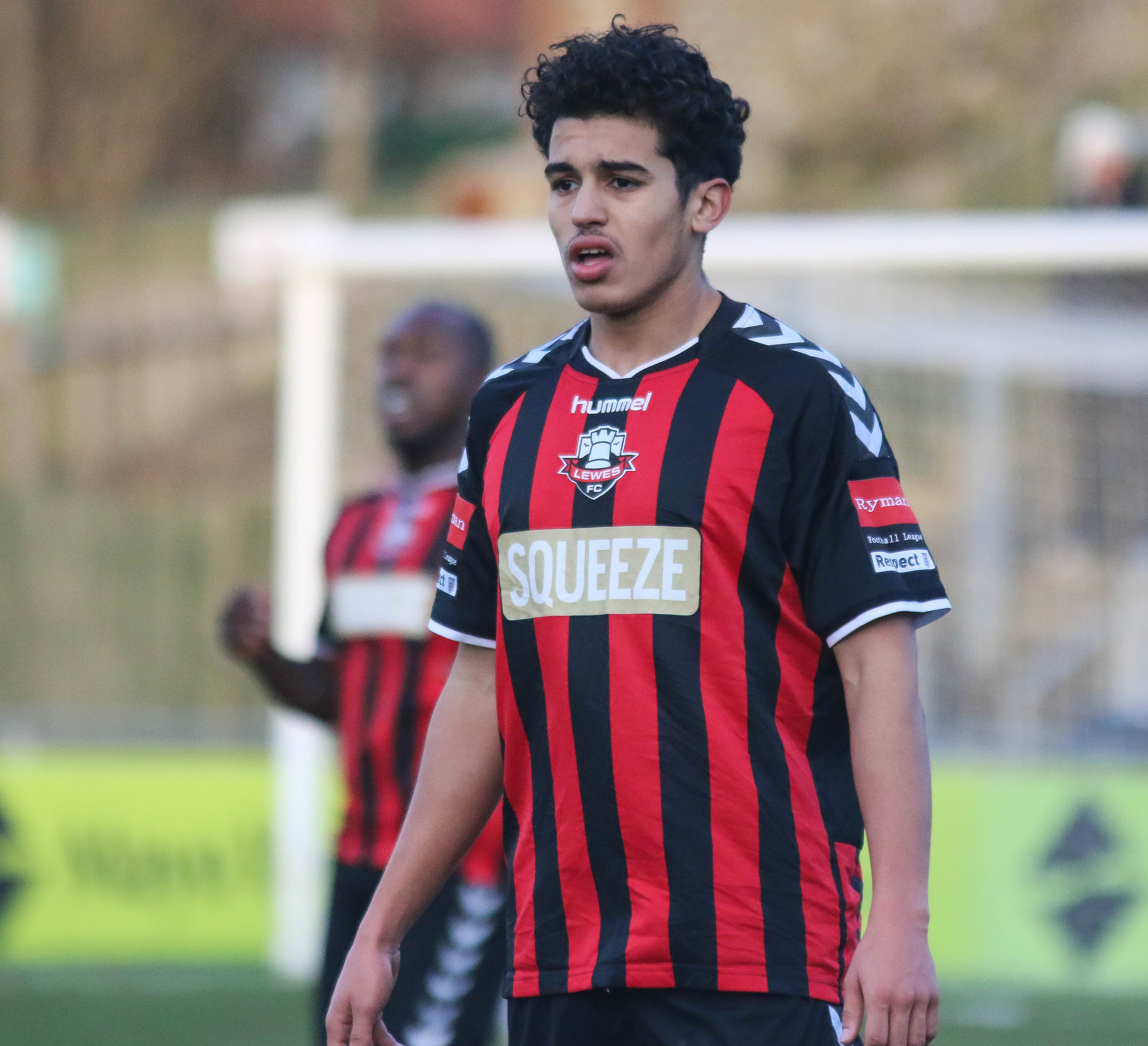
- Ben El-Mhanni playing for Lewes in 2015

Personal information
- Date of birth: 26 October 1995 (age 31)
- Place of birth: Shepherd's Bush, London, England
- Height: 1.78 m (5 ft 10 in)
- Position: Winger

Team information
- Current team: Duhok

Youth career
- Barnet
- Aldershot Town

Senior career*
Years	Team	Apps	(Gls)
2015	AFC Hayes	3	(0)
2015	Farnborough	3	(0)
2015–2016	Lewes	9	(0)
2016–2018	Newcastle United	0	(0)
2018–2020	Scunthorpe United	6	(0)
2021–2022	Chesham United	11	(0)
2022	Harrow Borough	10	(3)
2023	Arbroath	11	(2)
2026–	Duhok	0	(0)
- * Club domestic league appearances and goals as of 11:16, 5 February 2024 (UTC)

Yasin Ben El-Mhanni (born 26 October 1995) is an English professional footballer who plays as a winger for Duhok.

== Club career ==
=== Early career ===
El-Mhanni was born in Shepherd's Bush, London. He was soon signed by Barnet before playing with Aldershot Town, as well as Isthmian League clubs Farnborough and Lewes. While playing in the southern leagues, Ben El-Mhanni made a name for himself on YouTube where videos of his skill and trickery earned him the chance to star in commercials for Sports on Screen. For the commercials, Ben El-Mhanni flew to Spain and acted as a body double and skill consultant for Brazil and Barcelona star Neymar, as well as multiple Ballon d'Or winner Cristiano Ronaldo. His display of skill in the lower English leagues saw him dubbed the "non-League Riyad Mahrez" because of his North African heritage and similar style-of-play.

In 2015 and 2016, Ben El-Mhanni had trials with several Premier League clubs, including Watford, Bournemouth, West Bromwich Albion, Crystal Palace and Chelsea. During his spell with Chelsea, Ben El-Mhanni trained under first-team manager, Guus Hiddink and scored on his debut for the reserve side.

=== Newcastle United ===
On 8 July 2016, Ben El-Mhanni was signed by then Championship club Newcastle United. His debut came on 18 January 2017 in the third round of the FA Cup, in which he played 70 minutes in a 3–1 win over Championship rivals Birmingham City. Ben El-Mhanni featured again in the next round, but could not help prevent Newcastle from being eliminated at the hands of League One club Oxford United.

In January 2018, Ben El-Mhanni filed a grievance against Newcastle academy coach Peter Beardsley, accusing him of bullying and discrimination. Beardsley was placed on gardening leave and at the end of the season an independent appeal body found that he had used discriminatory language and conducted himself in a generally unfair manner towards El-Mhanni. In March, between the appeal process but unrelated thereto, El-Mhanni was advised that his contract with Newcastle would not be renewed.

After his release from Newcastle United he trained with West London club Brentford during preseason.

=== Scunthorpe United ===
On 26 October 2018, Ben El-Mhanni signed for EFL League One club Scunthorpe United on a contract until the end of the season. On 13 November, he made a goalscoring debut for the club when he netted and made an assist in a 3–2 EFL Trophy loss to Mansfield Town.

His contract was extended by Scunthorpe at the end of the 2018–19 season.

Ben El-Mhanni left League Two club Scunthorpe United in the summer of 2020 after only eight appearances.

In September 2021, Ben El-Mhanni joined Southern League Premier Division South club Chesham United. In February 2022, he joined Harrow Borough. During the summer, he left Harrow Borough.

=== Reading ===
In July 2022, Ben El-Mhanni joined Championship side Reading on trial. He featured in two preseason friendlies against Brighton & Hove Albion, and West Ham United. After his stint at Reading, Ben El-Mhanni was set to sign for Scottish Championship side Arbroath in October 2022, but after being denied by FIFA, he remained clubless until January 2023.

=== Arbroath ===
On 2 January 2023, after having waited since October 2022 to sign, Ben El-Mhanni joined Arbroath until the end of the season. He made his debut the same day in a win over league leaders Dundee.

In early 2025, he made an appearance in the first season of Baller League UK. In July 2025, he featured on trial in a pre-season friendly for Torquay United.

On 8 February 2026, El-Mhanni returned to professional football, signing a deal with Iraq Stars League side Duhok.

== Personal life ==
Born in London, El Mhanni is of Moroccan descent. El-Mhanni is a Muslim.

== Career statistics ==
As of match played 3 March 2020

Appearances and goals by club, season and competition
Club	Season	League			FA Cup		EFL Cup		Other		Total	
Club	Season	Division	Apps	Goals	Apps	Goals	Apps	Goals	Apps	Goals	Apps	Goals
A.F.C. Hayes	2014–15	Southern League First Division Central	2	0	—		—		—		2	0
Farnborough	2015–16	Isthmian League Premier Division	3	0	2	0	—		—		5	0
Lewes	2015–16	Isthmian League Premier Division	9	0	—		—		2 (Note: Appearances in FA Trophy)	1	11	1
Newcastle United	2016–17	Championship	0	0	2	0	0	0	—		2	0
Newcastle United	2017–18	Premier League	0	0	0	0	0	0	—		0	0
Newcastle United	Total		0	0	2	0	0	0	—		2	0
Scunthorpe United	2018–19	League One	5	0	1	0	0	0	1 (Note: Appearance in EFL Trophy)	1	7	1
Scunthorpe United	2019–20	League Two	1	0	0	0	0	0	0	0	1	0
Scunthorpe United	Total		6	0	1	0	0	0	1	1	8	1
Career total			20	0	5	0	0	0	3	2	26	2
