= Eetu Huuhtanen =

Finnish footballer (born 2003)

Personal information
- Date of birth: 31 January 2003 (age 23)
- Place of birth: Finland
- Height: 1.87 m (6 ft 2 in)
- Position: Goalkeeper

Team information
- Current team: Inter Turku
- Number: 1

Senior career*
Years	Team	Apps	(Gls)
2019–2022	Ilves II	43	(0)
2020–2022	Ilves	10	(0)
2023–	Inter Turku	110	(0)

International career^{‡}
2021	Finland U19	1	(0)
2023	Finland U21	1	(0)
- * Club domestic league appearances and goals as of 12 November 2026 ‡ National team caps and goals as of 20 June 2023

Eetu Huuhtanen (born 31 January 2003) is a Finnish professional footballer who plays as a goalkeeper for Finnish Premier Division club Inter Turku.

== Club career ==
On 2 January 2023, Huuhtanen signed a two-year contract with Veikkausliiga club Inter Turku.

== Personal life ==
His brother Otto is also a football goalkeeper.

== Career statistics ==
As of match played 12 November 2026

Appearances and goals by club, season and competition
Club	Season	League			National cup (Note: Includes Suomen Cup)		League cup (Note: Includes Finnish League Cup)		Europe		Total	
Club	Season	Division	Apps	Goals	Apps	Goals	Apps	Goals	Apps	Goals	Apps	Goals
Ilves II	2019	Kakkonen	2	0	—		—		—		2	0
Ilves II	2020	Kakkonen	11	0	—		—		—		11	0
Ilves II	2021	Kakkonen	13	0	—		—		—		13	0
Ilves II	2022	Kakkonen	17	0	—		—		—		17	0
Ilves II	Total		43	0	—		—		—		43	0
Ilves	2020	Veikkausliiga	1	0	0	0	—		—		1	0
Ilves	2021	Veikkausliiga	3	0	0	0	—		—		3	0
Ilves	2022	Veikkausliiga	6	0	2	0	1	0	—		9	0
Ilves	Total		10	0	2	0	1	0	—		13	0
Inter Turku	2023	Veikkausliiga	25	0	0	0	2	0	—		27	0
Inter Turku	2024	Veikkausliiga	22	0	4	0	2	0	—		28	0
Inter Turku	2025	Veikkausliiga	32	0	0	0	7	0	—		39	0
Inter Turku	2026	Veikkausliiga	31	0	2	0	6	0	8 (Note: Appearance(s) in UEFA Conference League)	0	47	0
Inter Turku	Total		110	0	6	0	17	0	8	0	141	0
Career total			163	0	8	0	18	0	8	0	197	0

== Honours ==
Inter Turku

- Veikkausliiga: 2026
- Finnish Cup: 2026; runner-up: 2024
- Finnish League Cup: 2024, 2025, 2026
