= Väinö Huuhtanen =

Finnish politician

Väinö Huuhtanen (3 April 1896, in Kivennapa – 5 May 1951) was a Finnish farmer, civil servant and politician. He served as a Member of the Parliament of Finland from 1929 to 1933, representing the Agrarian League.
