= Miika Huhtanen =

Finnish ice hockey player

- Born: 23 July 1993 (age 33) Lappeenranta, Finland
- Height: 5 ft 10 in (178 cm)
- Weight: 190 lb (86 kg; 13 st 8 lb)
- Position: Defense
- Shoots: Left
- Mestis team Former teams: Hermes; SaiPa; KeuPa HT; SaPKo
- NHL draft: Undrafted
- Playing career: 2013–present

Miika Huhtanen (born 23 July 1993) is a Finnish professional ice hockey player. He is currently playing for Hermes of the Finnish Mestis.

Huhtanen made his Liiga debut playing with SaiPa during the 2013-14 Liiga season.
