= Otto Huuhtanen =

Finnish footballer (born 2000)

Personal information
- Full name: Otto Eemeli Huuhtanen
- Date of birth: 28 February 2000 (age 26)
- Place of birth: Espoo, Finland
- Height: 1.91 m (6 ft 3 in)
- Position: Goalkeeper

Youth career
- –2016: Ilves
- 2016–2019: Newcastle United

Senior career*
Years	Team	Apps	(Gls)
2016	Ilves	0	(0)
2020	HIFK	1	(0)
2020	MYPA	6	(0)
2021	Honka	0	(0)
2021	→ JIPPO (loan)	3	(0)
2022	MP	16	(0)
2023	SJK	0	(0)
2023	SJK II	9	(0)
2024	Ilves II	3	(0)
2024	Ekenäs IF	1	(0)

International career^{‡}
2016–2017	Finland U17	7	(0)
2017–2018	Finland U18	2	(0)
2018	Finland U19	1	(0)
- * Club domestic league appearances and goals as of 14 July 2024 ‡ National team caps and goals as of 9 September 2018

Otto Eemeli Huuhtanen (born 28 February 2000) is a Finnish former footballer.

== Career ==
At the age of 16, Huuhtanen signed for Newcastle United in the English Premier League after a trial.

For 2020, he signed for Finnish top flight side HIFK Fotboll.

In 2020, he signed for Myllykosken Pallo −47 in the Finnish second division.

In January 2021, Huuhtanen signed for FC Honka

In February 2022, Huuhtanen signed for MP for the 2022 season.

On 20 December 2022, Huuhtanen signed with SJK for the 2023 season.

After Huuhtanen had already ended his playing career after the 2023 season, on 13 July 2024 he signed a short contract with Veikkausliiga club Ekenäs IF for a match against FC Inter Turku. The game ended in a 7–0 away win for Inter Turku.

== Personal life ==
His younger brother Eetu is also a professional football goalkeeper.
