= 2019–20 Shrewsbury Town F.C. season =

Shrewsbury Town F.C.
2019–20 season
- Chairman: Roland Wycherley
- Manager: Sam Ricketts
- Stadium: New Meadow
- EFL League One: 15th
- FA Cup: Fourth round
- EFL Cup: First round
- EFL Trophy: Second round
- Top goalscorer: League: Jason Cummings; Callum Lang; Daniel Udoh (4); All: Jason Cummings (7)
- Highest home attendance: 8,117 v Sunderland, 26 October 2019
- Lowest home attendance: 4,890 v Peterborough United, 5 November 2019
- Average home league attendance: 6,280
Home colours	Away colours	Third colours

The 2019–20 season was Shrewsbury Town's 134th year in existence and their fifth consecutive season in League One. The club also participated in the FA Cup, the EFL Cup and the EFL Trophy.

The season covered the period from 1 July 2019 to 30 June 2020.

== Transfers ==
=== Transfers in ===
Date	Position	Nationality	Name	From	Fee	Ref.
1 July 2019	DF	(England)	Ethan Ebanks-Landell	(England) Wolverhampton Wanderers	Undisclosed	
1 July 2019	DF	(Grenada)	Aaron Pierre	(England) Northampton Town	Undisclosed	
1 July 2019	FW	(Nigeria)	Daniel Udoh	(England) AFC Telford United	Undisclosed	
4 July 2019	GK	(Republic of Ireland)	Joe Murphy	(England) Bury	Free transfer	
12 July 2019	RB	(Scotland)	Donald Love	(England) Sunderland	Free transfer	
8 August 2019	CF	(Wales)	Steve Morison	(England) Millwall	Undisclosed	
16 August 2019	CM	(Germany)	Sean Goss	(England) Queens Park Rangers	Undisclosed	
2 September 2019	CF	(Australia)	Jason Cummings	(England) Nottingham Forest	Undisclosed	
3 December 2019	DM	(France)	Ousmane Fané	(England) Oldham Athletic	Free transfer	
20 January 2020	CM	(England)	Josh Vela	(Scotland) Hibernian	Free transfer	
31 January 2020	GK	(England)	Harry Burgoyne	(England) Wolverhampton Wanderers	Undisclosed	

=== Loans in ===
Date from	Position	Nationality	Name	From	Date until	Ref.
1 July 2019	LM	(England)	Ryan Giles	(England) Wolverhampton Wanderers	January 2020	
1 July 2019	CF	(Wales)	Steve Morison	(England) Millwall	8 August 2019	
5 July 2019	GK	(England)	Max O'Leary	(England) Bristol City	30 June 2020	
18 July 2019	CM	(England)	Luke McCormick	(England) Chelsea	January 2020	
16 August 2019	DM	(Wales)	Louis Thompson	(England) Norwich City	16 January 2020	
2 September 2019	CF	(England)	Callum Lang	(England) Wigan Athletic	30 June 2020	
17 January 2020	LB	(England)	Sam Hart	(England) Blackburn Rovers	30 June 2020	
30 January 2020	CF	(England)	Conor McAleny	(England) Fleetwood Town	30 June 2020	
31 January 2020	RB	(England)	Kayne Ramsay	(England) Southampton	30 June 2020	

=== Loans out ===
Date from	Position	Nationality	Name	To	Date until	Ref.
1 August 2019	GK	(England)	Cameron Gregory	(England) Kidderminster Harriers	1 January 2020	
1 August 2019	FW	(Zambia)	Lifumpa Mwandwe	(Wales) Newtown	1 January 2020	
2 September 2019	CM	(England)	Anthony Grant	(England) Swindon Town	1 January 2020	
17 September 2019	MF	(England)	Kian Taylor	(England) Coalville Town	1 January 2020	
7 November 2019	AM	(England)	Ryan Barnett	(England) AFC Telford United	1 May 2020	
6 March 2020	GK	(England)	Cameron Gregory	(England) Nantwich Town	April 2020	
14 March 2020	RB	(England)	Ryan Sears	(England) AFC Telford United	13 April 2020	

=== Transfers out ===
Date	Position	Nationality	Name	To	Fee	Ref.
1 July 2019	FW	(Wales)	Aaron Amadi-Holloway	(Australia) Brisbane Roar	Undisclosed	
1 July 2019	FW	(England)	Lee Angol	(England) Leyton Orient	Undisclosed	
1 July 2019	GK	(England)	Steve Arnold	(England) Northampton Town	Undisclosed	
1 July 2019	DF	(England)	James Bolton	(England) Portsmouth	Free transfer	
1 July 2019	MF	(England)	George Hughes	(Wales) Airbus UK Broughton	Released	
1 July 2019	MF	(Wales)	Sam Jones	(England) Harrogate Town	Mutual consent	
1 July 2019	MF	(England)	Doug Loft	(England) Billericay Town	Released	
1 July 2019	FW	(England)	John McAtee	(England) Scunthorpe United	Released	
1 July 2019	DF	(England)	Mat Sadler	(England) Walsall	Released	
1 July 2019	DF	(Cyprus)	Christos Shelis	(Cyprus) APOEL	Released	
9 July 2019	RW	(England)	Alex Gilliead	(England) Scunthorpe United	Undisclosed	
12 July 2019	LB	(England)	Ryan Haynes	(Wales) Newport County	Undisclosed	
9 August 2019	GK	(England)	Reice Charles-Cook	(England) Macclesfield Town	Free transfer	
15 August 2019	LW	(Sudan)	Abo Eisa	(England) Scunthorpe United	Undisclosed	
16 August 2019	CB	(England)	Luke Waterfall	(England) Grimsby Town	Free transfer	
6 January 2020	CM	(England)	Anthony Grant	(England) Swindon Town	Undisclosed	
16 January 2020	CF	(England)	Lenell John-Lewis	Free agent	Released	
30 January 2020	LW	(Nigeria)	Fejiri Okenabirhie	(England) Doncaster Rovers	Undisclosed	

== Squad ==
As of 7 March 2020

No.	Pos	Nat	Player	Total		League One		FA Cup		League Cup		League Trophy	
No.	Pos	Nat	Player	Apps	Goals	Apps	Goals	Apps	Goals	Apps	Goals	Apps	Goals
1	GK	(Republic of Ireland) IRL	Joe Murphy	12	0	4+0	0	4+0	0	1+0	0	3+0	0
2	DF	(Grenada) GRN	Aaron Pierre	38	2	29+1	2	6+1	0	0+1	0	0+0	0
3	DF	(England) ENG	Scott Golbourne	27	2	14+1	1	7+0	0	1+0	0	4+0	1
4	MF	(Wales) WAL	David Edwards	37	4	24+5	1	2+3	1	0+0	0	2+1	2
5	DF	(England) ENG	Ro-Shaun Williams	34	0	24+1	0	6+0	0	0+0	0	3+0	0
6	DF	(Grenada) GRN	Omar Beckles	32	3	25+3	3	2+0	0	1+0	0	1+0	0
7	MF	(England) ENG	Shaun Whalley	33	2	15+8	2	4+2	0	0+1	0	3+0	0
8	MF	(England) ENG	Oliver Norburn	24	3	17+0	3	6+0	0	0+0	0	1+0	0
9	MF	(England) ENG	Callum Lang	20	4	14+2	4	2+2	0	0+0	0	0+0	0
12	DF	(Wales) WAL	Ryan Sears	2	0	2+0	0	0+0	0	0+0	0	0+0	0
15	MF	(England) ENG	Brad Walker	23	2	4+11	0	1+2	1	1+0	0	4+0	1
16	MF	(France) FRA	Romain Vincelot	2	0	2+0	0	0+0	0	0+0	0	0+0	0
17	DF	(Scotland) SCO	Donald Love	38	0	26+2	0	7+0	0	0+0	0	2+1	0
18	FW	(England) ENG	Conor McAleny	5	0	5+0	0	0+0	0	0+0	0	0+0	0
19	MF	(England) ENG	Ryan Barnett	3	0	0+0	0	0+0	0	1+0	0	1+1	0
20	MF	(England) ENG	Josh Vela	4	0	4+0	0	0+0	0	0+0	0	0+0	0
21	DF	(England) ENG	Kayne Ramsay	8	0	3+2	0	0+0	0	1+0	0	1+1	0
22	DF	(Germany) GER	Sean Goss	31	1	15+7	0	5+1	1	0+0	0	3+0	0
23	FW	(Nigeria) NGA	Daniel Udoh	33	4	12+13	4	2+3	0	0+0	0	2+1	0
24	DF	(England) ENG	Ethan Ebanks-Landell	38	0	28+0	0	7+0	0	1+0	0	2+0	0
25	GK	(Republic of Ireland) IRL	Max O'Leary	33	0	30+0	0	3+0	0	0+0	0	0+0	0
26	MF	(England) ENG	James Rowlands	3	0	2+0	0	0+0	0	1+0	0	0+0	0
28	MF	(England) ENG	Josh Laurent	42	4	30+1	2	7+0	2	0+0	0	3+1	0
35	FW	(Australia) AUS	Jason Cummings	32	7	14+11	4	3+3	2	0+0	0	1+0	1
42	DF	(England) ENG	Sam Hart	4	0	2+2	0	0+0	0	0+0	0	0+0	0
Players who left the club:
10	FW	(Nigeria) NGA	Fejiri Okenabirhie	24	3	6+11	2	1+2	0	1+0	0	2+1	1
11	MF	(England) ENG	Ryan Giles	25	1	15+4	1	2+1	0	0+1	0	2+0	0
14	FW	(England) ENG	Lenell John-Lewis	4	0	0+2	0	0+0	0	0+0	0	1+1	0
18	MF	(England) ENG	Luke McCormick	7	0	4+1	0	0+0	0	1+0	0	0+1	0
20	FW	(Wales) WAL	Steve Morison	8	0	6+1	0	0+0	0	1+0	0	0+0	0
21	MF	(Sudan) SDN	Abo Eisa	1	0	0+1	0	0+0	0	0+0	0	0+0	0
21	MF	(England) ENG	Louis Thompson	14	1	1+9	0	0+1	0	0+0	0	3+0	1
22	DF	(England) ENG	Luke Waterfall	1	0	0+0	0	0+0	0	1+0	0	0+0	0

== Pre-season ==
Shrews announced pre-season friendlies against Aston Villa and Cheltenham Town.

9 July 2019 Friendly	Shrewsbury Town	0–2	Sheffield Wednesday	Ferreiras
19:00 BST				Stadium: Estadio da Nora

17 July 2019 Friendly	Shrewsbury Town	0–1	Newport County	Ludlow
19:00 BST		Report	Matt 57'	Stadium: Ludlow Football Stadium

21 July 2019 Friendly	Shrewsbury Town	0–1	Aston Villa	Shrewsbury
14:00 BST		Report	Hogan 66'	Stadium: Montgomery Waters Meadow; Attendance: 9,322; Referee: John Brooks

23 July 2019 Friendly	Cheltenham Town	2–2	Shrewsbury Town	Cheltenham
19:45 BST	Campbell 43', 60'	Report	Whalley 24'; Eisa 80'	Stadium: Jonny-Rocks Stadium; Attendance: 841

27 July 2019 Friendly	Shrewsbury Town	2–1	Dundee United	Shrewsbury
15:00 BST	Okenabirhie 8' (pen.), 74'	Report	Appere 5' (pen.)	Stadium: Montgomery Waters Meadow; Attendance: 2,687; Referee: Peter Wright

== Competitions ==
=== League One ===
==== League table ====
Pos	Team	Pld	W	D	L	GF	GA	GD	Pts	PPG
11	Ipswich Town	36	14	10	12	46	36	+10	52	1.44
12	Burton Albion	35	12	12	11	50	50	0	48	1.37
13	Blackpool	35	11	12	12	44	43	+1	45	1.29
14	Bristol Rovers	35	12	9	14	38	49	−11	45	1.29
15	Shrewsbury Town	34	10	11	13	31	42	−11	41	1.21
16	Lincoln City	35	12	6	17	44	46	−2	42	1.20
17	Accrington Stanley	35	10	10	15	47	53	−6	40	1.14
18	Rochdale	34	10	6	18	39	57	−18	36	1.06
19	Milton Keynes Dons	35	10	7	18	36	47	−11	37	1.06

Source: EFL Official Website
Rules for classification: 1) Points per game; 2) Goal difference; 3) Number of goals scored; 4) Head-to-head results; 5) Wins; 6) Away goals; 7) Penalty points (sec 9.5); 8) 12-point sending-off offences

==== Result summary ====
Overall								Home						Away					
Pld	W	D	L	GF	GA	GD	Pts	W	D	L	GF	GA	GD	W	D	L	GF	GA	GD
34	10	11	13	31	42	−11	41	6	5	6	21	24	−3	4	6	7	10	18	−8

Last updated: 7 March 2020.

==== Results by round ====
Round	1	2	3	4	5	6	7	8	9	10	11	12	13	14	15	16	17	18	19	20	21	22	23	24	25	26	27	28	29	30	31	32	33	34
Ground	H	A	H	A	H	A	A	H	A	H	A	A	H	H	A	H	H	A	H	A	H	A	A	H	A	A	A	H	H	A	H	H	A	H
Result	W	L	D	W	D	L	D	W	D	L	W	D	D	W	L	W	L	D	W	W	L	D	L	D	D	L	L	D	L	L	W	L	W	L
Position	9	12	12	8	9	12	15	13	11	12	12	13	14	12	12	11	12	12	11	11	11	12	15	15	16	16	16	16	17	17	17	17	15	16

Updated to match(es) played on 7 March 2020. Source: Anus
A = Away; H = Home; W = Win; D = Draw; L = Loss

==== Matches ====
On Thursday, 20 June 2019, the EFL League One fixtures were revealed.

3 August 2019 1	Shrewsbury Town	1–0	Portsmouth	Shrewsbury
15:00 BST	Giles 68'	Report	McCrorie (red card) 81'	Stadium: Montgomery Waters Meadow; Attendance: 7,880; Referee: Charles Breakspear

10 August 2019 2	Milton Keynes Dons	1–0	Shrewsbury Town	Denbigh
15:00 BST	Martin (yellow card) 53'; Healey 90+3'	Report	Edwards (yellow card) 27'	Stadium: Stadium MK; Attendance: 7,967; Referee: Brett Huxtable

17 August 2019 3	Shrewsbury Town	0–0	Rochdale	Shrewsbury
15:00 BST	Ebanks-Landell (yellow card) 39'; Whalley (yellow card) 61'	Report	Norrington-Davies (yellow card) 78'	Stadium: Montgomery Waters Meadow; Attendance: 5,641; Referee: Ben Toner

20 August 2019 4	Accrington Stanley	2–3	Shrewsbury Town	Accrington
19:45 BST	Maguire (yellow card) 25'; Clark (yellow card) 52'; Bishop 67' (pen.); Charles 72'		Hughes 77' (o.g.); Okenabirhie 85'; Udoh 89'	Stadium: Crown Ground; Attendance: 2,284; Referee: Scott Oldham

24 August 2019 5	Shrewsbury Town	0–0	Burton Albion	Shrewsbury
15:00 BST	Okenabirhie (yellow card) 73'	Report	O'Toole (yellow card) 55'	Stadium: New Meadow; Attendance: 5,553; Referee: Lee Swabey

31 August 2019 6	Ipswich Town	3–0	Shrewsbury Town	Ipswich
15:00 BST	Jackson 2'; Norwood 10' (pen.); Downes 69' (yellow card) 87'	Report	Whalley (yellow card) 5' (yellow-red card) 38'; Love (yellow card) 38'; Pierre (yellow card) 76'; Goss (yellow card) 85'	Stadium: Portman Road; Attendance: 19,161; Referee: Trevor Kettle

7 September 2019	Shrewsbury Town	v	Peterborough United	Shrewsbury
15:00 BST		Report		Stadium: Montgomery Waters Meadow
Note: The match was postponed on 30 August 2019, due to international call-ups.

14 September 2019 7	AFC Wimbledon	1–1	Shrewsbury Town	Norbiton
15:00 BST	Ebanks-Landell 31' (o.g.)	Report	Cummings 73'	Stadium: Kingsmeadow; Attendance: 4,084; Referee: Graham Salisbury

17 September 2019 8	Shrewsbury Town	4–3	Southend United	Shrewsbury
19:45 BST	Beckles 19'; Cummings 27'; Norburn 61'; Lang 83'		McLaughlin 29'; Humphrys 77'; Cox 90+1'	Stadium: Montgomery Waters Meadow; Attendance: 4,909; Referee: James Adcock

21 September 2019 9	Rotherham United	0–0	Shrewsbury Town	Rotherham
15:00 BST		Report		Stadium: AESSEAL New York Stadium; Attendance: 8,380; Referee: Carl Boyeson

28 September 2019 10	Shrewsbury Town	0–3	Fleetwood Town	Shrewsbury
15:00 BST			Lang 36' (o.g.); Morris 56'; Madden 81'	Stadium: Montgomery Waters Meadow; Attendance: 5,888

5 October 2019 11	Tranmere Rovers	0–1	Shrewsbury Town	Birkenhead
15:00 BST			Lang 20'	Stadium: Prenton Park; Attendance: 7,314; Referee: Craig Hicks

18 October 2019 12	Lincoln City	0–0	Shrewsbury Town	Lincoln
19:45 BST	Bolger (red card) 80'	Report	Pierre (yellow card) 27'; Norburn (yellow card) 74'	Stadium: Sincil Bank; Attendance: 8,710; Referee: Josh Smith

22 October 2019 13	Shrewsbury Town	1–1	Gillingham	Shrewsbury
19:45 BST	Beckles 64'		O'Keefe 43'	Stadium: Montgomery Waters Meadow; Attendance: 5,076; Referee: Will Finnie

26 October 2019 14	Shrewsbury Town	1–0	Sunderland	Shrewsbury
15:00 BST	Cummings 22'			Stadium: Montgomery Waters Meadow; Attendance: 8,117; Referee: Jarred Gillet

3 November 2019 15	Wycombe Wanderers	1–0	Shrewsbury Town	High Wycombe
15:00 BST	Aarons 57'			Stadium: Adams Park; Attendance: 4,826; Referee: Brett Huxtable

5 November 2019 16	Shrewsbury Town	1–0	Peterborough United	Shrewsbury
19:45 GMT	Ebanks-Landell 45+1'	Report		Stadium: Montgomery Waters Meadow; Attendance: 4,890; Referee: Darren Handley

16 November 2019	Doncaster Rovers	v	Shrewsbury Town	Doncaster
15:00 GMT		Report		Stadium: Keepmoat Stadium
Note: On 7 November, the match was postponed due to international call-ups.

23 November 2019 17	Shrewsbury Town	3–4	Bristol Rovers	Shrewsbury
15:00 GMT	Thompson (yellow card) 20'; Laurent (yellow card) 20' (goal) 37', 67'; Norburn (yellow card) 22' (goal) 62'	Report	Craig 11'; Jaakkola (yellow card) 20'; Adeboyejo (yellow card) 21'; Clarke 28' (yellow card) 36'; Sercombe 47'; Ogogo 87'	Stadium: Montgomery Waters Meadow; Attendance: 6,235; Referee: Graham Salisbury

7 December 2019 18	Oxford United	0–0	Shrewsbury Town	Oxford
15:00 GMT	Dickie (yellow card) 14'		Ebanks-Landell (yellow card) 73'; Edwards (yellow card) 84'; Pierre (yellow card) 89'; Williams (yellow card) 90+3'	Stadium: Kassam Stadium; Attendance: 6,931; Referee: Craig Hicks

14 December 2019 19	Shrewsbury Town	2–1	Coventry City	Shrewsbury
15:00 GMT	Golbourne 68'; Whalley 90+1'		Shipley 26'	Stadium: Montgomery Waters Meadow; Attendance: 7,336; Referee: Tom Nield

21 December 2019 20	Blackpool	0–1	Shrewsbury Town	Blackpool
15:00 GMT	Virtue (yellow card) 60'; Spearing (yellow card) 66'	Report	Landell (yellow card) 20'; Love (yellow card) 54'; Okenabirhie 56' (pen.); Golbourne (yellow card) 85'	Stadium: Bloomfield Road; Attendance: 7,695; Referee: Seb Stockbridge

26 December 2019 21	Shrewsbury Town	1–2	Rotherham United	Shrewsbury
15:00 GMT	Whalley (yellow card) 51'; Pierre 66'; Love (yellow card) 72'; Golbourne (yellow card) 84'	Report	Mattock 60'; Smith 90+7'	Stadium: Montgomery Waters Meadow; Attendance: 7,555; Referee: Marc Edwards

29 December 2019 22	Bolton Wanderers	1–1	Shrewsbury Town	Bolton
15:00 GMT	Verlinden 34'		Udoh 53'	Stadium: Montgomery Waters Meadow; Attendance: 13,788; Referee: Michael Salisbury

7 January 2020 23	Doncaster Rovers	2–0	Shrewsbury Town	Doncaster
19:45 GMT	Ennis 4'; Anderson 75'; Halliday (yellow card) 86'	Report	Ebanks-Landell (yellow card) 52'	Stadium: Keepmoat Stadium; Attendance: 7,054; Referee: Ben Toner

11 January 2020 24	Shrewsbury Town	1–1	Lincoln City	Shrewsbury
15:00 GMT	Norburn 36' (pen.) (yellow card) 83'; Golbourne (yellow card) 68'	Report	Walker 48' (pen.)	Stadium: Montgomery Waters Meadow; Attendance: 6,275; Referee: Andy Haines

18 January 2020 25	Fleetwood Town	2–2	Shrewsbury Town	Fleetwood
15:00 GMT	Coyle 49'; Morris 87'	Report	Whalley 39'; Norburn (yellow card) 55'; Cummings 81'	Stadium: Highbury Stadium; Attendance: 2,797; Referee: Christopher Sarginson

25 January 2020	Shrewsbury Town	v	Bolton Wanderers	Shrewsbury
15:00 GMT		Report		Stadium: Montgomery Waters Meadow
Note: Fixture was postponed due to Shrewsbury's FA Cup progression.

29 January 2020 26	Gillingham	2–0	Shrewsbury Town	Gillingham
19:45 GMT	O'Keefe 26'; Lee 40' (pen.); Akinde (yellow card) 62'	Report	Hart (yellow card) 77'; Walker (yellow card) 89'; Pierre (yellow card) 90+4'	Stadium: Priestfield Stadium; Referee: Geoff Eltringham

1 February 2020 27	Rochdale	1–0	Shrewsbury Town	Spotland
15:00 GMT	Smith 88'	Report	Williams (yellow card) 90+3'	Stadium: Crown Oil Arena; Attendance: 2,829; Referee: Carl Boyeson

8 February 2020 28	Shrewsbury Town	1–1	Milton Keynes Dons	Shrewsbury
15:00 GMT	Beckles 62'; Ebanks-Landell (yellow card) 79'	Report	Houghton (yellow card) 7'; Lewington (yellow card) 67'; Healey 77'	Stadium: Montgomery Waters Meadow; Attendance: 5,791; Referee: Peter Wright

11 February 2020 29	Shrewsbury Town	0–2	Accrington Stanley	Shrewsbury
19:45 GMT	Beckles (yellow card) 9'; McAleny (yellow card) 28'; Ebanks-Landell (yellow card) 70'	Report	Grant 13'; Clark 71'; Johnson (yellow card) 80'; Charles (yellow card) 86'	Stadium: Montgomery Waters Meadow; Attendance: 4,699; Referee: Ollie Yates

15 February 2020 30	Portsmouth	2–0	Shrewsbury Town	Milton
15:00 GMT	Burgess (yellow card) 48'; Harrison 64'; Marquis 82'	Report	Williams (yellow card) 19'; Ebanks-Landell (yellow card) 21'; Lang (yellow card) 86'; Goss (yellow card) 90'	Stadium: Fratton Park; Attendance: 18,214; Referee: Lee Swabey

22 February 2020 31	Shrewsbury Town	1–0	Doncaster Rovers	Shrewsbury
15:00 GMT	Edwards 76'; Lang (yellow card) 90+1'		Gomes (yellow card) 90+1'	Stadium: New Meadow; Attendance: 5,672; Referee: Andy Woolmer

25 February 2020 32	Shrewsbury Town	2–3	Tranmere Rovers	Shrewsbury
19:45 GMT	Pierre 56'; Lang 61'; Beckles (yellow card) 76'	Report	Ellis 9'; Woodyard 14'; Vaughan (yellow card) 27'; Wilson (yellow card) 41'; Ridehalgh (yellow card) 81'; Blackett-Taylor 90+5'	Stadium: Montgomery Waters Meadow; Attendance: 5,009; Referee: James Oldham

29 February 2020 33	Bristol Rovers	0–1	Shrewsbury Town	Horfield
15:00 GMT	Menayese (yellow card) 29'; Kilgour (yellow card) 84'	Report	Pierre (yellow card) 43'; Udoh 69'; Williams (yellow card) 74'; Cummings (yellow card) 87'; Lang (yellow card) 90'; Edwards (yellow card) 90'	Stadium: Memorial Stadium; Attendance: 6,954; Referee: Alan Young

7 March 2020 34	Shrewsbury Town	2–3	Oxford United	Shrewsbury
15:00 GMT	Vela (yellow card) 9' (yellow-red card) 35'; Udoh 12'; Lang 34'; Ebanks-Landell (yellow card) 62'; Edwards (yellow card) 87'	Report	Browne 45+3'; Agyei 59'; Brannagan (yellow card) 66'; Ruffels 88'	Stadium: Montgomery Waters Meadow; Attendance: 6,474; Referee: Sebastian Stockbridge

14 March 2020	Coventry City	v	Shrewsbury Town	Bordesley
15:00 GMT				Stadium: St Andrew's Trillion Trophy Stadium
Note: Season was suspended until 3 April 2020, due to the COVID-19 pandemic.

21 March 2020	Shrewsbury Town	v	Blackpool	Shrewsbury
15:00 GMT				Stadium: Montgomery Waters Meadow
Note: Season was suspended until 3 April 2020, due to the COVID-19 pandemic.

28 March 2020	Shrewsbury Town	v	Wycombe Wanderers	Shrewsbury
15:00 GMT				Stadium: Montgomery Waters Meadow
Note: Season was suspended until 3 April 2020, due to the COVID-19 pandemic.

4 April 2020	Sunderland	v	Shrewsbury Town	Sunderland
15:00 GMT				Stadium: Stadium of Light
Note: On 3 April, the English Football League decided to postpone all football until safe to do so due to the COVID-19 pandemic.

10 April 2020	Burton Albion	v	Shrewsbury Town	Burton upon Trent
15:00 BST				Stadium: Pirelli Stadium
Note: On 3 April, the English Football League decided to postpone all football until safe to do so due to the COVID-19 pandemic.

13 April 2020	Shrewsbury Town	v	Ipswich Town	Shrewsbury
15:00 BST				Stadium: Montgomery Waters Meadow
Note: On 3 April, the English Football League decided to postpone all football until safe to do so due to the COVID-19 pandemic.

18 April 2020	Peterborough United	v	Shrewsbury Town	Peterborough
15:00 BST				Stadium: Weston Homes Stadium
Note: On 3 April, the English Football League decided to postpone all football until safe to do so due to the COVID-19 pandemic.

21 April 2020	Shrewsbury Town	v	Bolton Wanderers	Shrewsbury
19:45 BST				Stadium: Montgomery Waters Meadow
Note: On 3 April, the English Football League decided to postpone all football until safe to do so due to the COVID-19 pandemic.

25 April 2020	Shrewsbury Town	v	AFC Wimbledon	Shrewsbury
15:00 BST				Stadium: Montgomery Waters Meadow
Note: On 3 April, the English Football League decided to postpone all football until safe to do so due to the COVID-19 pandemic.

3 May 2020	Southend United	v	Shrewsbury Town	Southend-on-Sea
15:00 BST				Stadium: Roots Hall
Note: On 3 April, the English Football League decided to postpone all football until safe to do so due to the COVID-19 pandemic.

=== FA Cup ===
The first round draw was made on 21 October 2019. The second round draw was made live on 11 November from Chichester City's stadium, Oaklands Park. The third round draw was made live on BBC Two from Etihad Stadium, Micah Richards and Tony Adams conducted the draw. The fourth round draw was made by Alex Scott and David O'Leary on Monday, 6 January.

9 November 2019 First round	Shrewsbury Town	1–1	Bradford City	Shrewsbury
15:00 GMT	Laurent 28'; Ebanks-Landell (yellow card) 51'	Report	Henley (yellow card) 17'; Oteh 19'	Stadium: Montgomery Waters Meadow; Attendance: 3,764; Referee: Sam Purkiss

19 November 2019 First round replay	Bradford City	0–1	Shrewsbury Town	Bradford
19:45 GMT	Wood (yellow card) 42'	Report	Edwards 66'; Love (yellow card) 89'; Golbourne (yellow card) 90+3'	Stadium: Northern Commercials Stadium; Referee: Paul Marsden

30 November 2019 Second round	Shrewsbury Town	2–0	Mansfield Town	Shrewsbury
15:00 GMT	Golbourne (yellow card) 25'; Pierre (yellow card) 39'; Norburn (red card) 60'; Laurent 88'; Walker 90+5'	Report	Shaughnessy (yellow card) 18'; Preston (yellow card) 34'	Stadium: Montgomery Waters Meadow; Attendance: 3,678; Referee: Andy Haines

4 January 2020 Third round	Bristol City	1–1	Shrewsbury Town	Ashton Gate
15:00 GMT	Diédhiou 30'	Report	Goss 48'	Stadium: Ashton Gate Stadium; Attendance: 9,730; Referee: John Busby

14 January 2020 Third round replay	Shrewsbury Town	1–0	Bristol City	Shrewsbury
19:45 GMT	Goss (yellow card) 30'; Pierre 89'; Murphy (yellow card) 90+5'	Report	Hunt (yellow card) 36'	Stadium: Montgomery Waters Meadow; Attendance: 7,194; Referee: David Webb

26 January 2020 Fourth round	Shrewsbury Town	2–2	Liverpool	Shrewsbury
17:00 GMT	Cummings 65' (pen.), 75'	Report	Jones 15'; Love 46' (o.g.); Larouci (yellow card) 64'	Stadium: Montgomery Waters Meadow; Referee: Simon Hooper

4 February 2020 Fourth round replay	Liverpool	1–0	Shrewsbury Town	Liverpool
20:00 GMT	Williams (yellow card) 40'; Williams 75' (o.g.)	Report	Golbourne (yellow card) 32'; Love (yellow card) 65'	Stadium: Anfield; Referee: Andrew Madley

=== EFL Cup ===
The first round draw was made on 20 June.

13 August 2019 First round	Shrewsbury Town	0–4	Rotherham United	Shrewsbury
19:45 BST	Rowland (yellow card) 55'	Report	Crooks 2'; Vassell 3'; Ladapo 45'; Wood 84'	Stadium: Montgomery Waters Meadow; Attendance: 2,813; Referee: Anthony Backhouse

=== EFL Trophy ===
On 9 July 2019, the pre-determined group stage draw was announced with Invited clubs to be drawn on 12 July 2019. The draw for the second round was made on 16 November 2019 live on Sky Sports.

Pos	Div	Team	Pld	W	PW	PL	L	GF	GA	GD	Pts	Qualification
1	L2	Port Vale	3	3	0	0	0	7	4	+3	9	Advance to Round 2
2	L1	Shrewsbury Town	3	2	0	0	1	7	3	+4	6	Advance to Round 2
3	L2	Macclesfield Town	3	1	0	0	2	5	7	−2	3	
4	ACA	Newcastle United U21	3	0	0	0	3	2	7	−5	0	

Source: EFL.com

3 September 2019 Group stage	Port Vale	2–1	Shrewsbury Town	Burslem
19:45 BST	Amoo 63' (pen.); Archer 75'	Report	Kennedy 27' (o.g.); Love (yellow card) 69'	Stadium: Vale Park; Attendance: 1,008; Referee: Leigh Doughty

8 October 2019 Group stage	Shrewsbury Town	3–0	Newcastle United U21	Shrewsbury
19:30 BST	Okenabirhie 22'; Cummings 33'; Whalley (yellow card) 82'; Edwards 87'	Report	Young (yellow card) 73'; Sterry (yellow card) 86'	Stadium: Montgomery Waters Meadow; Attendance: 1,408; Referee: Peter Wright

13 November 2019 Group stage	Shrewsbury Town	3–1	Macclesfield Town	Shrewsbury
19:30 BST	Thompson 28'; Edwards 74'; Love (red card) 76'; Walker 83'		Archibald 59'	Stadium: Montgomery Waters Meadow; Attendance: 1,065; Referee: Peter Wright

3 December 2019 Second round	Shrewsbury Town	1–1 (5–6 p)	Manchester City U21	Shrewsbury
19:30 GMT	Golbourne 24'; Laurent (yellow card) 41'; Goss (yellow card) 45+1'	Report	Doyle 68'	Stadium: Montgomery Waters Meadow; Attendance: 1,384; Referee: Peter Wright
	Penalties
	Norburn (penalty scored); Walker (penalty scored); Edwards (penalty scored); Okenabirhie (penalty scored); Goss (penalty scored); Golbourne (penalty missed)		Doyle (penalty scored); McDonald (penalty scored); Fiorini (penalty scored); García (penalty scored); Simmonds (penalty scored); Poveda (penalty scored)
