= James Rowland =

James Rowland may refer to:

- James Rowland (RAAF officer) (1922–1999), Royal Australian Air Force commander
- J. Roy Rowland (1926–2022), physician and politician from Georgia
- James Rowland (footballer) (born 2001), English footballer
- James H. Rowland, American football and basketball coach, and college athletics administrator

== See also ==
- James Rowlands (disambiguation)
- James Rowlandson (1577–1639), English clergyman
