= James Rowlands =

James Rowlands is the name of:

- James Rowlands (footballer), English footballer
- James Rowlands (politician), British politician

== See also ==
- James Rowland
