= Shaun Whalley =

English association football player (born 1987)

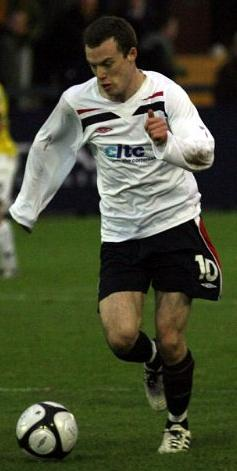
- Whalley with Hyde

Personal information
- Full name: Shaun James Whalley
- Date of birth: 7 August 1987 (age 39)
- Place of birth: Prescot, Merseyside, England
- Height: 5 ft 9 in (1.75 m)
- Positions: Winger; striker

Team information
- Current team: Accrington Stanley
- Number: 7

Youth career
- 2001–2004: Norwich City
- 2004: Southport

Senior career*
Years	Team	Apps	(Gls)
2004–2005	Chester City	3	(0)
2005–2006	Runcorn	21	(3)
2006–2007	Witton Albion	18	(6)
2006–2007	→ Accrington Stanley (loan)	6	(0)
2007–2008	Accrington Stanley	45	(5)
2008–2009	Wrexham	16	(4)
2009	→ Southport (loan)	14	(0)
2009–2010	Droylsden	32	(15)
2010–2011	Hyde	16	(3)
2011–2013	Southport	101	(27)
2013–2015	Luton Town	34	(4)
2014	→ AFC Telford United (loan)	18	(5)
2015–2022	Shrewsbury Town	214	(40)
2022–	Accrington Stanley	144	(23)
- * Club domestic league appearances and goals as of 16:45, 3 May 2026 (UTC)

Shaun James Whalley (born 7 August 1987) is an English professional footballer who plays as a forward for EFL League Two club Accrington Stanley. Born in Prescot, Merseyside, Whalley played for Norwich City and Southport as a youth before making his Football League debut with Chester City in 2004.

After leaving Chester, he spent time in non-League football with Runcorn F.C. Halton and Witton Albion. While on the books at Witton, he spent five weeks on trial with Football League One side Crewe Alexandra but was not offered a contract, so he signed for League Two side Accrington Stanley in 2006. Whalley spent almost two years with the Lancashire club, but following his release in the summer of 2008, he returned to non-League, initially with Wrexham. While at Wrexham, he had a short loan spell with Southport where he helped the team to the Conference North play-offs. He subsequently played at Droylsden, where he was part of the team that won the Manchester Premier Cup in 2010, and Hyde before joining Southport again on a permanent basis in January 2011. He was signed by Luton Town in the summer of 2013 for an undisclosed fee, and joined AFC Telford United on loan in 2014. Both Luton and Telford won their respective leagues during the 2013–14 season, making Whalley a winner of both the Conference Premier and the Conference North in the same season. He left Luton in May 2015, later joining Shrewsbury.

Described as an "express-train down the wings" by former teammate Paul Mullin, Whalley was called up to the Football Association XI standby squad for a game against Hallam, the game taking place to celebrate the 150th anniversary of the club. He is the son of the former Preston North End captain Neil Whalley, who was also a midfielder.

== Early and personal life ==
Whalley was born in Prescot, Merseyside but raised in Widnes. Growing up, Whalley was an avid fan of Liverpool. As a child, he played football for his local teams until 2001 when he was spotted by Norwich City. He went to play for their academy, where he played for three years before leaving in 2004. He subsequently returned to Merseyside and joined Southport, where he played several reserve-team matches. In the summer of the same year, Whalley turned professional when he signed for Football League side Chester City.

Whalley's father, Neil Whalley, was also a professional footballer in the early 1990s. He too played in midfield and made more than 50 appearances for Preston North End, where he was also captain for a period of time.

He has stated that he has had problems with alcohol and gambling, but has moderated his use of both.

== Career ==
=== Early career ===
With Chester, Whalley played mostly for the youth and reserve teams, but he made his Football League debut for the club in a 0–0 draw with Cambridge United on 18 September 2004, coming on as a substitute for Darryn Stamp. His debut came just one day after he signed a professional contract with Chester; manager Ian Rush had only included him on the substitutes' bench as a result of injuries to Daryl Clare and Michael Branch. The following week, he was part of the side that defeated Sheffield Wednesday at Hillsborough Stadium in the second round of the Football League Trophy. Whalley made three further senior appearances for Chester, all as a substitute, before leaving the club in the summer of 2005.

In August of that year, Whalley moved into non-League football with Runcorn as one of several new signings for the Northern Premier League outfit. He made his first appearance for the club in the 1–1 draw with Frickley Athletic and subsequently established himself as a regular first-team player. Whalley scored his first goal for Runcorn in the 5–1 defeat of his hometown club, Prescot Cables and he netted again the following week in the loss to Matlock Town. He went on to play 21 league matches for Runcorn before joining Witton Albion in March 2006. During his short spell with the club, he scored 6 goals in 18 league appearances.

=== Accrington Stanley ===
In September 2006, while at Witton, Whalley spent five weeks on trial at League One club Crewe Alexandra, but he was not offered a permanent contract. He subsequently joined League Two side Accrington Stanley on loan two months later. Whalley made his debut for the club in the 1–2 defeat to Hartlepool United at the Crown Ground. However, two weeks later, he was sent off in the Football League Trophy match against Doncaster Rovers following a high tackle on Theo Streete, although Accrington manager John Coleman felt that the challenge was not deserving of a red card. The subsequent suspension meant that Whalley spent almost a month out of the side before returning in late December in the loss to Bristol Rovers. He made his transfer to Accrington permanent in January 2007, signing a two-year contract with the club, and the following week he scored a late winner in the 3–2 victory over Mansfield Town, his first goal for the team. Whalley remained a first-team regular for the rest of the 2006–07 season and retained his place in the starting line-up throughout most of the following season, and scored his first Accrington goal away from the Crown Ground in the 8–2 loss at Peterborough United on 15 January 2008. Whalley made a total of 51 league appearances for Accrington, scoring 5 goals, but in May 2008, he was one of 10 players released by the club.

=== Return to non-League ===
In June 2008, he moved down a division to join Conference Premier side Wrexham. He scored his first goal for Wrexham on his debut in a 5–0 win over Stevenage. Whalley followed it up with another goal in a 1–1 draw with Rushden & Diamonds. He scored his third and fourth goals of the month as Wrexham beat Salisbury City 4–1, which proved to be his last game for that club. He then joined Conference North side Southport on loan in February 2009 for the remainder of the 2008–09 season. Whalley made his Southport debut in the 2–0 win over Hyde United at Haig Avenue. He went on to play 13 league matches for the team as they reached the Conference North play-offs, but they were defeated in the semi-finals by Gateshead. During the loan spell, Whalley played in the quarter-finals of the FA Trophy, but he could not prevent Southport losing 3–2 on aggregate over two legs against AFC Telford United. In the summer of 2009, he was released by Wrexham along with eight other out-of-contract players.

In August 2009, following his release from Wrexham, Whalley returned to the Conference North to join Droylsden. Whalley scored his first two goals for the club as Droylsden beat Northwich Victoria 5–1. He added another goal to his tally, scoring in a 2–0 win over league favourites Fleetwood Town, before adding another two goals to his name as Droylsden beat Harrogate Town 5–0. He scored two goals in a match for the third time in the season as Droylsden recorded a 5–3 win over Solihull Moors at the Butcher's Arms Ground. He won Manchester Premier Cup winners medal in his one season at Droylsden before he left at the end of the 2009–10 season, having scored a total of 15 goals in 32 league appearances.

=== Hyde ===
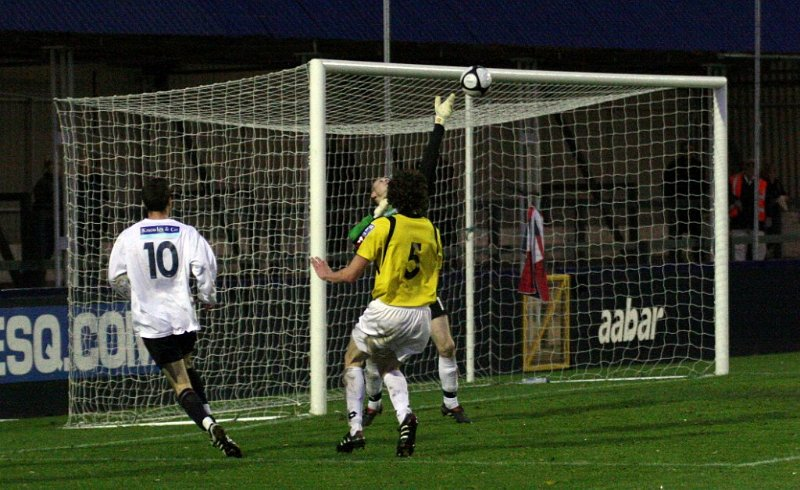
Whalley playing and attempting to score against Harrogate Town; his shot is rising over the crossbar.

Whalley joined Hyde on 21 August 2010 after his release from Droylsden. He made his debut just hours after he signed for the Tigers in a 5–1 home defeat to Alfreton Town. In just his third appearance for Hyde, he was sent off in a 1–0 defeat to Guiseley. Whalley scored his first goal for Hyde in a 2–1 home win over Corby Town.

In early October, while still on the books at Hyde, he was called up to the Football Association XI squad alongside teammate Scott Mooney for a game against Hallam FC to celebrate the 150th anniversary of the Sheffield-based club. Whalley scored his first cup goal for the club in a 4–0 win over Oldham Boro in the Manchester Premier Cup, but less than a week later, he scored an own goal as part of a 3–0 away loss to Blyth Spartans, and was then sent off again for two bookable offences against Vauxhall Motors

Whalley scored his first goal of the new year in a 2–1 victory over local rivals Stalybridge Celtic. He scored again in the quarter-final of the Manchester Premier Cup against his old club Droylsden, which proved to be his last for the club.

=== Southport ===
Whalley was released by Hyde in order to join Southport for the second time in January 2011. He made his debut the following Saturday in a 4–0 win over York City, scoring Southport's second and fourth goals. On 1 February, less than a week later, Whalley scored again in a 2–2 draw with Grimsby Town to take his record to three goals in two games, before being sent off for violent conduct on and later receiving a four match ban. On 26 February after missing the best-part of that month through his suspension, he returned, to start in a 2–1 loss to Bath City, but he was unable to score a goal. He followed this game up by scoring in his next two, netting in the 3–1 win over Histon and then by scoring Southport's only goal, in a 4–1 defeat to Eastbourne Borough. He finished March having scored four goals that month, after adding another two in the latter part, the first in a 4–2 defeat to the hands of Barrow and the other coming as-part of a 2–2 draw with Rushden & Diamonds.

He opened his goalscoring account for the 2011–12 season on the opening day as part of a 2–2 draw with Lincoln City. He scored his second of the season in a 3–2 win over Telford United. On 15 March 2012, he signed a new two-year contract with the club. He scored a total of ten goals in all-competitions for Southport in the 2011–12 season, helping them to their highest league finish in ten years—7th in the Conference Premier.

Whalley had a good start to the 2012–13 season, scoring two goals in four games, including in a 3–3 draw with Alfreton Town. He went on to play in all but three of Southport's league games, scoring seven further goals and at the end of the season was named the club's player of the year.

=== Luton Town ===
On 1 May 2013, Whalley was signed by fellow Conference Premier club Luton Town for an undisclosed fee on a two-year contract. He missed a penalty on his debut in a 1–0 defeat, coincidentally against former club Southport.

After failing to win a regular starting place in the Luton line-up, Whalley moved on loan on 23 January 2014 to Conference North side AFC Telford United, led by his former Southport manager Liam Watson. He scored five goals in 18 games as Telford won the Conference North title, scoring in the crucial final game of the season. With Luton also winning their league, Whalley had the unique distinction of being awarded both Conference Premier and Conference North winners' medals in the same season.

Whalley played a more active part in Luton's return to the Football League, playing in 18 league games, often in the starting XI, and scoring three goals.

On 27 April 2015, Whalley and teammate Ricky Miller were both arrested by Bedfordshire Police in connection with an alleged assault following Luton Town's end of season awards night. Both were released on bail, but were suspended by the club pending a police inquiry. Whalley was not charged due to a lack of evidence. On 18 May 2015, Whalley left Luton by mutual consent two months before the end of his contract.

=== Shrewsbury Town ===
Following his departure from Luton, Whalley joined Shrewsbury Town, recently promoted to League One, on 6 June 2015. Making only sporadic substitute appearances in the early part of the season, Whalley had to wait until 28 December to make his first league start for the club, scoring a late winning goal in a 2–1 away victory over Crewe Alexandra. He scored another late winner away at the league-leaders Burton Albion the following month, eventually ending the season with seven goals in all competitions as Shrewsbury avoided relegation with a game to spare.

A persistent thigh injury restricted Whalley's first-team involvement at the start of the following season, which also coincided with a change in management at the club, after a poor start to the season left Shrewsbury rooted to the bottom of the League One table. Whalley scored his first goal of the season against Oxford United, deep in injury time, to seal a 2–0 victory for new manager Paul Hurst in his first home league match in charge.

After becoming a first-team regular under Hurst, and helping Shrewsbury avoid relegation once again in 2016–17, Whalley signed a two-year contract extension in May 2017. He featured in 58 matches in all competitions in 2017–18, scoring twelve goals, as Shrewsbury reached both the EFL Trophy final and the 2018 EFL League One play-off final, although they ultimately finished as runners-up on both occasions.

Having surpassed 150 appearances for the club in all competitions during the 2018–19 season, Whalley signed another two-year contract extension in April 2019.

On 4 February 2020, Whalley scored in front of the travelling Shrewsbury fans at Anfield in an FA Cup fourth round replay against his beloved Liverpool, only for the goal to be controversially overturned by VAR for offside against Scott Golbourne.

Whalley reached 200 appearances for the club in November 2020, marking the occasion with the opening goal in a 2–2 draw against Milton Keynes Dons. His dedication to the club was celebrated by managers and teammates past and present in the local press. An appearance-based contract extension was triggered in May 2021, committing him to the club until Summer 2022.

On 3 May 2022, it was confirmed that Whalley would be leaving Shrewsbury Town after seven years, after being forced out by then Manager Steve Cotterill.

=== Return to Accrington Stanley ===
In July 2022, Whalley rejoined Accrington on a two-year deal. On 7 May 2024, the club announced he had signed a one-year extension.

Following a run of four goals in five matches, Whalley was named EFL League Two Player of the Month for January 2025.

== Style of play ==
Whalley is a winger but can also play as a striker. On his arrival at Southport, manager Liam Watson said "Shaun will fit right into our style of play and with the players we have here". Whalley's former teammate Paul Mullin described him as "an absolute express-train down the wings", and said that he possessed good ability on the ball.

== Career statistics ==
As of match played 18 April 2022

Appearances and goals by club, season and competition
Club	Season	League			FA Cup		League Cup		Other		Total	
Club	Season	Division	Apps	Goals	Apps	Goals	Apps	Goals	Apps	Goals	Apps	Goals
Chester City	2004–05	League Two	3	0	0	0	0	0	2	0	5	0
Runcorn	2005–06	Northern Premier League	21	3	0	0	–		0	0	21	3
Witton Albion	2005–06	Northern Premier League	9	4	0	0	–		0	0	9	4
Witton Albion	2006–07	Northern Premier League	9	2	0	0	–		0	0	9	2
Witton Albion	Total		18	6	0	0	–		0	0	18	6
Accrington Stanley	2006–07	League Two	20	2	0	0	0	0	1	0	21	2
Accrington Stanley	2007–08	League Two	31	3	1	0	1	0	1	0	34	3
Accrington Stanley	Total		51	5	1	0	1	0	2	0	55	5
Wrexham	2008–09	Conference Premier	16	4	0	0	–		0	0	16	4
Southport (loan)	2008–09	Conference North	14	0	0	0	–		0	0	14	0
Droylsden	2009–10	Conference North	32	15	3	1	–		5	3	40	19
Hyde	2010–11	Conference North	16	3	2	0	–		4	2	22	5
Southport	2010–11	Conference Premier	17	8	0	0	–		0	0	17	8
Southport	2011–12	Conference Premier	41	10	2	0	–		1	0	44	10
Southport	2012–13	Conference Premier	43	9	1	0	–		4	2	48	11
Southport	Total		101	27	3	0	–		5	2	109	29
Luton Town	2013–14	Conference Premier	16	1	1	0	–		5	1	22	2
Luton Town	2014–15	League Two	18	3	1	0	0	0	0	0	19	3
Luton Town	Total		34	4	2	0	0	0	5	1	41	5
AFC Telford United (loan)	2013–14	Conference North	18	5	0	0	–		0	0	18	5
Shrewsbury Town	2015–16	League One	24	6	4	1	1	0	1	0	30	7
Shrewsbury Town	2016–17	League One	32	3	1	0	1	0	1	0	35	3
Shrewsbury Town	2017–18	League One	44	8	4	2	1	1	9	1	58	12
Shrewsbury Town	2018–19	League One	32	2	2	0	1	1	1	0	36	3
Shrewsbury Town	2019–20	League One	23	2	6	0	1	0	3	0	33	2
Shrewsbury Town	2020–21	League One	38	9	2	0	1	0	0	0	41	9
Shrewsbury Town	2021–22	League One	19	4	0	0	1	0	2	0	22	4
Shrewsbury Town	Total		212	34	19	3	7	2	17	1	255	40
Career total			537	105	30	4	8	2	40	9	614	120

== Honours ==
Droylsden

- Manchester Premier Cup: 2009–10

Luton Town

- Conference Premier: 2013–14

AFC Telford United

- Conference North: 2013–14

Shrewsbury Town

- EFL Trophy runner-up: 2017–18

Individual

- EFL League Two Player of the Month: January 2025
