= Cameron Gregory =

English footballer (born 2000)

Personal information
- Full name: Cameron Akash James Gregory
- Date of birth: 20 January 2000 (age 26)
- Place of birth: Sutton Coldfield, England
- Height: 6 ft 4 in (1.92 m)
- Position: Goalkeeper

Team information
- Current team: Shrewsbury Town
- Number: 30

Youth career
- Birmingham City
- Wolverhampton Wanderers
- –2018: Shrewsbury Town

Senior career*
Years	Team	Apps	(Gls)
2018–2022	Shrewsbury Town	0	(0)
2018	→ Chippenham Town (loan)	?	(0)
2018	→ Halesowen Town (loan)	10	(0)
2019	→ Kidderminster Harriers (loan)	13	(0)
2020	→ Nantwich Town (loan)	2	(0)
2020	→ Hednesford Town (loan)	0	(0)
2022–2023	Kettering Town	15	(0)
2023–2025	Boston United	82	(0)
2025–2026	Brackley Town	4	(0)
2026–	Shrewsbury Town	0	(0)
- * Club domestic league appearances and goals as of 13:19, 19 October 2025 (UTC)

Cameron Akash James Gregory (born 20 January 2000) is an English professional footballer who plays as a goalkeeper for EFL League Two club Shrewsbury Town.

== Early life ==
Gregory was born in Sutton Coldfield in the West Midlands.

== Career ==
Gregory had spells at Birmingham City and Wolverhampton Wanderers at youth level. He joined Shrewsbury Town at under-15 level. He was awarded a scholarship the same year.

On 29 August 2017, whilst still a scholar, Gregory was called up to the first-team squad. He was an unused substitute in a 3–2 away win at Coventry City in the EFL Trophy. He also made the bench in games against West Bromwich Albion U23s and Walsall, also both in the EFL Trophy. For the remainder of the 2017–18 season, he regularly trained with Danny Coyne and the rest of the first-team goalkeepers. In April 2018, Gregory, along with Ryan Sears and Christos Shelis, was offered a professional contract. In May 2018, he signed his first professional contract.

In September 2018, Gregory joined National League South side Chippenham Town on a month-long loan deal. However, just days into the loan, he was recalled due to a training injury to first-team keeper Steve Arnold. A month later in October, Gregory was loaned out once again, this time to Southern League Division One Central side Halesowen Town on a month-long loan.

On 31 July 2019, Gregory joined National League North side Kidderminster Harriers on loan until January 2020. However, on 7 November, he was recalled to Shrewsbury due to an injury to Max O'Leary.

On 6 March 2020, Gregory was loaned out once again, this time to Northern Premier League side Nantwich Town, joining The Dabbers on a month-long loan. Due to the COVID-19 pandemic, the loan was cut short due to the Northern Premier League season being ended early.

On 30 June 2020, he signed a new deal with his parent club which would keep him at the club until 2022, with the option of a further year.

On 9 October 2020, Gregory moved on loan once again, this time joining Hednesford Town on a month-long deal.

On 29 June 2022, Gregory joined National League North club Kettering Town following his release from Shrewsbury Town at the end of the 2021–22 season. In what turned out to be Gregory's last game for Kettering Town away at Bradford (Park Avenue) on 7 January 2023 he received a red card in injury time of the first half.

On 12 January 2023, Gregory signed for National League North side Boston United. He departed the club at the end of the 2024–25 season.

On 23 June 2025, Brackley Town announced the signing of Gregory ahead of their first ever season in the National League.

== Honours ==
Boston United

- National League North play-offs: 2024
