= Ro-Shaun Williams =

English footballer

Personal information
- Full name: Roshaun Omar Stuart Williams
- Date of birth: 3 September 1998 (age 28)
- Place of birth: Manchester, England
- Height: 6 ft 2 in (1.88 m)
- Position: Defender

Youth career
- Fletcher Moss Rangers
- 2008–2019: Manchester United

Senior career*
Years	Team	Apps	(Gls)
2019–2021	Shrewsbury Town	81	(0)
2021–2023	Doncaster Rovers	64	(1)
2024	Larne	10	(0)

International career
- England U17
- England U18
2016	England U19	2	(0)
- * Club domestic league appearances and goals as of 08:55, 23 April 2024 (UTC)

Roshaun Omar Stuart Williams (born 3 September 1998), known as Ro-Shaun Williams, is an English professional footballer who plays as a defender.

== Early and personal life ==
Williams was born in Manchester, and grew up in Whalley Range. In 2014 he said that Ryan Giggs was his hero. At the age of 15 he broke Darren Campbell's 100-metre schoolboy sprinting record.

== Club career ==
=== Manchester United ===
Williams began his football career at Fletcher Moss Rangers, he then moved to Manchester United at the age of nine, joining the club at his mother's insistence so that he stopped kicking a football around inside the house. He was linked with a loan move away from the club at the start of the 2018–19 season, but joined the club's pre-season tour of the United States. Later that season he spent time training with the first-team whilst still playing for their youth team.

=== Shrewsbury Town ===
He signed for Shrewsbury Town in January 2019. He made his professional debut on 9 February 2019 in a 1–1 EFL League One draw away to Bristol Rovers.

In April 2021 Williams said he was hoping to soon hit the 100 game milestone for Shrewsbury.

On 12 May 2021 it was announced that he would leave Shrewsbury at the end of the season, following the expiry of his contract.

=== Doncaster Rovers ===
On 18 June 2021 it was announced that Williams would transfer to Doncaster Rovers on 1 July 2021, following the expiry of his Shrewsbury contract, after he signed a two-year deal. He was released by the club at the end of the 2022–23 season.

=== Larne ===
In January 2024 he signed for Northern Irish club Larne on a short-term contract.

== International career ==
He has represented England at under-17, under-18, and under-19 youth international levels. He is eligible for Grenada through his mother who was born on the island in Victoria.

== Career statistics ==
As of 2 December 2024

Appearances and goals by club, season and competition
Club	Season	League			National Cup		League Cup		Other		Total	
Club	Season	Division	Apps	Goals	Apps	Goals	Apps	Goals	Apps	Goals	Apps	Goals
Shrewsbury Town	2018–19	League One	16	0	0	0	0	0	0	0	16	0
Shrewsbury Town	2019–20	League One	25	0	6	0	0	0	3 (Note: Appearance(s) in EFL Trophy)	0	34	0
Shrewsbury Town	2020–21	League One	40	0	3	0	1	0	3	0	47	0
Shrewsbury Town	Total		81	0	9	0	1	0	6	0	97	0
Doncaster Rovers	2021–22	League One	32	0	0	0	1	0	2	0	35	0
Doncaster Rovers	2022–23	League Two	32	1	1	0	1	0	1	0	35	1
Doncaster Rovers	Total		64	1	1	0	2	0	3	0	70	1
Larne	2023–24	NIFL Premiership	10	0	3	0	0	0	0	0	13	0
Career total			155	1	13	0	3	0	9	0	180	1

== Honours ==
Larne NIFL Premiership: 2023–24
