= Fejiri Okenabirhie =

English footballer (born 1996)

- Okenabirhie with Wealdstone in 2026

Personal information
- Full name: Fejiri Shaun Chima Okenabirhie
- Date of birth: 25 February 1996 (age 30)
- Place of birth: Hendon, England
- Height: 5 ft 10 in (1.78 m)
- Positions: Winger; forward

Team information
- Current team: Wealdstone
- Number: 26

Youth career
- 2005–2012: Arsenal
- 2012–2014: Stevenage

Senior career*
Years	Team	Apps	(Gls)
2014–2015	Stevenage	3	(0)
2014	→ Bedford Town (loan)	7	(2)
2014	→ Farnborough (loan)	19	(0)
2015	→ Cambridge City (loan)	7	(1)
2015	→ Royston Town (loan)	6	(2)
2015–2016	Harrow Borough	30	(8)
2016–2018	Dagenham & Redbridge	68	(19)
2018–2020	Shrewsbury Town	55	(12)
2020–2022	Doncaster Rovers	44	(13)
2022–2024	Cambridge United	38	(5)
2024–2026	Modern Sport	22	(1)
2026–	Wealdstone	9	(6)

International career^{‡}
2017–2018	England C	5	(4)
- * Club domestic league appearances and goals as of 22:45, 10 November 2026 (UTC) ‡ National team caps and goals as of 21:18, 27 May 2018 (UTC)

Fejiri Shaun Chima Okenabirhie (born 25 February 1996) is an English professional footballer who plays as a winger or forward for National League side Wealdstone.

Okenabirhie started his career with the youth sides of Arsenal and Stevenage, eventually progressing to the first team of the latter in April 2014. He made three professional appearances in the English Football League during his time with the club and was loaned out four times to Bedford Town, Farnborough, Cambridge City and Royston Town between 2014 and 2015. Following his release from Stevenage he dropped into non-league football joining Harrow Borough. After impressing in his first season with the club he jumped up two divisions to sign for Dagenham & Redbridge of the National League in June 2016, and two years later he stepped up another two divisions to Shrewsbury.

He has represented the England C team, gaining five caps and scoring four goals.

== Club career ==
=== Stevenage ===
Okenabirhie was born in Hendon, London and started his career as a youth player at Arsenal before joining Stevenage as an apprentice in 2012. He was a key figure in the side that reached the fourth round of the FA Youth Cup during the 2012–13 campaign, scoring five goals in the process. On 7 January 2014, he joined Southern League Premier Division side Bedford Town on a month's loan aged seventeen. He scored the opening goal on his debut against Stourbridge on the same day, but the game finished in a 2–1 defeat. His loan spell coincided with seven straight defeats for Bedford, scoring another goal against St Neots Town before returning to Stevenage in February 2014. He made his professional debut for Stevenage on 21 April 2014 in the 3–1 defeat to Bristol City in League One, replacing Rohdell Gordon as a substitute in the second half. He then made his first start five days later in the 3–2 home win over Walsall. He played in the final game of the season against Brentford as the side were relegated to League Two, finishing in 24th. This proved to be his final appearance for Stevenage.

On 17 May 2014, it was announced that Okenabirhie had signed his first professional contract on a one-year deal. On 8 August 2014 he signed for Conference South side Farnborough on a season-long loan deal. He was nearly ever-present during his loan spell but failed to score a goal in 19 league appearances, however, he did score in an FA Trophy victory over Sholing. He returned to Stevenage early from the loan spell at the end of December 2014. On 23 January 2015 he was sent out to Southern League Premier Division side Cambridge City on a youth loan for the remainder of the season. He made a total of eight appearances in all competitions for the Lilywhites scoring three goals. On 26 March 2015 he was recalled early from his loan at Cambridge by Stevenage and subsequently signed for Southern League Division One Central side Royston Town on a youth loan until the end of the season to help with their promotion push. He helped Royston make the play-offs with goals in wins over Potters Bar Town and Rugby Town, but the side later lost on penalties to Barton Rovers in the semi-final. On 20 May 2015 upon his return to Stevenage, he was one of 13 players to be released by the club at the end of the 2014–15 campaign.

=== Harrow Borough ===
Following his release from Stevenage, Okenabirhie joined League One team Millwall on a trial basis in August 2015 and scored in his first game for the under-21 side against Ipswich Town. However, the trial was unsuccessful and he subsequently joined League Two side Barnet for another trial. On 6 November 2015, Okenabirhie joined Isthmian League Premier Division side Harrow Borough. On 7 November he made his league debut for the club in a 4–1 win over Lewes and scored his first goal for the club in a 3–2 win over Wealdstone in the Middlesex Senior Cup three days later. He was a first team regular throughout the season with Harrow notching 10 goals in 34 appearances in all competitions as the side finished near the foot of the table.

=== Dagenham & Redbridge ===
In June 2016, he joined National League side Dagenham & Redbridge on a two-year deal following their relegation from the Football League. Manager John Still said, "Fejiri was another player that was brought to my attention while I was at Luton by my scouting network". He made his debut for the Daggers in the opening game of the season, scoring the first goal and assisting the second in a 3–0 win over Torquay United. He added to his goal tally in August and September with strikes against Woking and Solihull Moors, which alerted England C staff members and led to suggestions of a possible call-up. On 22 October he picked up an injury in the 1–1 draw with Macclesfield Town which kept him out of the side, on and off for around two months. In February 2017, he signed a new one-year contract extension until June 2019. He remained in the side until the end of season as the Daggers eventually lost to Forest Green Rovers in the play-off semi-finals.

Dagenham started brightly to the 2017-18 season and were unbeaten in their first eight matches with Okenabirhie scoring in the 2–1 win over Boreham Wood. In November 2017 he missed six weeks of action due to injury, making his comeback over the Christmas period in a 1–1 draw with Ebbsfleet United. The sides form wavered in January 2018 but he still scored three goals in four games. Dagenham went into financial difficulty in February 2018 when director Glyn Hopkin withdrew his financial support and a number of key players were sold. Okenabirhie was subsequently pushed further up the pitch and scored four goals in four games in February with braces in wins over Torquay United and Chester.

=== Shrewsbury Town ===
It was announced on 10 June 2018 that Okenabirhie had joined League One side Shrewsbury Town on a two-year deal. He made his debut on 4 August in the first game of the season, a 1–0 home loss to Bradford City in which he replaced Stefan Payne for the final nine minutes. His first goals came on his eighth appearance, a 6–0 win against Tranmere Rovers at the New Meadow on 9 October, after which manager John Askey considered fielding him as a starter in league games.

On 17 November, Okenabirhie opened his league account for the Shrews in a 3–2 home win against Rochdale, and was praised by caretaker manager Danny Coyne. He netted again in the next four league games, as well as two in an FA Cup first round replay 3–1 at Salford City on 21 November.

Okenhabirhie equalised with a late penalty as Shrewsbury came from 2–0 down at half time to defeat Stoke City 3–2 away in the third round of the same tournament on 15 January 2019, and two weeks later he scored another hat-trick, albeit in a 4–3 loss at Bradford. He finished the season as the team's top scorer with 16 goals from 49 games, the last of which guaranteed a 1–1 draw at Coventry City in the penultimate match on 28 April, keeping the Shrews in League One; afterwards manager Sam Ricketts said that he would be the principal striker for the following season.

=== Doncaster Rovers ===
On 30 January 2020, Okenabirhie joined fellow League One club Doncaster Rovers on a two-and-a-half-year deal. The fee was undisclosed, though it is understood to be higher than £75k, which was originally reported by various sources. Okenabirhie was released by the club at the end of the 2021–22 season following relegation to League Two, the club continuing to support Okenabirhie through his recovery from a long-term achilles injury.

=== Cambridge United ===
On 29 July 2022, Cambridge United announced the signing of Okenabirhie on a one-year deal, which was then extended for another year. On 1 May 2024 the club announced that the player would be released at the end of his contract.

=== Modern Sport ===
In September 2024, Okenabirhie joined Egyptian side Modern Sport.

=== Wealdstone ===
On 26 September 2026, Okenabirhie signed for National League side Wealdstone on an initial three-month deal. He scored his first goal for the club three days later, in a 1–1 draw against Forest Green Rovers.

== Personal life ==
Okenabirhie is a devout Christian.

== International career ==
Okenabirhie is eligible for Nigeria through his parents. In July 2012 he was called up to the under-17 side, attending the training camp prior to the AFCON U17 qualifier vs Togo. He was later called up to the England C team, who represent England at non-league level, for their two fixtures in May 2017. He made his debut on 28 May 2017, playing the full match in a 2–1 win over Panjab FA at Damson Park. Two days later, he scored the opening goal after coming on as a substitute in a 1–1 draw with Jersey FA. In October 2017 he was called up to a training camp at Lilleshall in preparation for the match against Slovakia. He later appeared in that match a month later, winning his third cap in the 4–0 defeat. In March 2018 Okenabirhie secured a hat-trick for England C in the win against Wales at Jenner Park.

== Career statistics ==
As of match played 10 November 2026

Appearances and goals by club, season and competition
Club	Season	League			FA Cup		League Cup		Other		Total	
Club	Season	Division	Apps	Goals	Apps	Goals	Apps	Goals	Apps	Goals	Apps	Goals
Stevenage	2013–14	League One	3	0	0	0	0	0	0	0	3	0
Stevenage	2014–15	League Two	0	0	—		0	0	0	0	0	0
Stevenage	Total		3	0	0	0	0	0	0	0	3	0
Bedford Town (loan)	2013–14	SL Premier Division	7	2	—		—		—		7	2
Farnborough (loan)	2014–15	Conference South	19	0	2	0	—		2 (Note: Appearances in FA Trophy)	1	23	1
Cambridge City (loan)	2014–15	SL Premier Division	7	1	—		—		1 (Note: Appearance in Cambridgeshire Invitation Cup)	2	8	3
Royston Town (loan)	2014–15	SL Division One Central	6	2	—		—		1 (Note: Appearance in Southern League Division One Central play-offs)	0	7	2
Harrow Borough	2015–16	IL Premier Division	30	8	—		—		4 (Note: Two appearances and one goal in Middlesex Senior Cup, two appearances and one goal in London County Cup)	2	34	10
Dagenham & Redbridge	2016–17	National League	30	7	1	1	—		2 (Note: Appearances in National League play-offs)	0	33	8
Dagenham & Redbridge	2017–18	National League	38	12	1	0	—		0	0	39	12
Dagenham & Redbridge	Total		68	19	2	1	—		2	0	72	20
Shrewsbury Town	2018–19	League One	38	10	6	3	1	0	4 (Note: Appearances in EFL Trophy)	3	49	16
Shrewsbury Town	2019–20	League One	17	2	3	0	1	0	3	1	24	3
Shrewsbury Town	Total		55	12	9	3	2	0	7	4	73	19
Doncaster Rovers	2019–20	League One	5	2	—		—		—		5	2
Doncaster Rovers	2020–21	League One	39	11	4	1	1	1	3	1	47	14
Doncaster Rovers	2021–22	League One	0	0	0	0	0	0	0	0	0	0
Doncaster Rovers	Total		44	13	4	1	1	1	3	1	52	16
Cambridge United	2022–23	League One	17	0	0	0	1	0	3	2	21	2
Cambridge United	2023–24	League One	21	5	2	2	1	2	2	0	26	9
Cambridge United	Total		38	5	2	2	2	2	5	2	47	11
Modern Sport	2024–25	League One	11	1	—		—		3 (Note: Appearances in Egyptian League Cup)	0	14	1
Modern Sport	2025–26	League One	11	0	—		—		2	0	13	0
Modern Sport	Total		22	1	0	0	0	0	5	0	27	1
Wealdstone	2026–27	National League	7	3	2	1	—		0	0	9	4
Career total			306	66	21	8	5	3	25	12	362	89
