= Football League Apprentice of the Year =

English football award

The Football League Apprentice of the Year is an annual award in English football, awarded by the League Football Education. To be eligible the players must be under-18 or turn 18 during the current season.

== Awards ==
=== Championship ===
| Season | Player | Nationality | Club | Ref |
|---|---|---|---|---|
| 2005–06 | Lewin Nyatanga | Wales | Derby County | |
| 2006–07 | Chris Gunter | Wales | Cardiff City | |
| 2007–08 | Mark Beevers | England | Sheffield Wednesday | |
| 2008–09 | Sean Scannell | Republic of Ireland | Crystal Palace | |
| 2009–10 | Adam Matthews | Wales | Cardiff City | |
| 2010–11 | Connor Wickham | England | Ipswich Town | |
| 2011–12 | Gaël Bigirimana | Burundi | Coventry City | |
| 2012–13 | Dimitar Evtimov | Bulgaria | Nottingham Forest | |
| 2013–14 | Mason Bennett | England | Derby County | |
| 2014–15 | Lewis Cook | England | Leeds United | |
| 2015–16 | Ademola Lookman | Nigeria | Charlton Athletic | |
| 2016–17 | Ben Brereton Díaz | Chile | Nottingham Forest | |
| 2017–18 | Ryan Sessegnon | England | Fulham | |
| 2018–19 | Max Bird | England | Derby County | |
| 2019–20 | Jude Bellingham | England | Birmingham City | |
| 2020–21 | Will Trueman | England | Sheffield Wednesday | |
| 2021–22 | Ryan Howley | Wales | Coventry City | |
| 2022–23 | Ashley Phillips | England | Blackburn Rovers | |

=== League One ===
| Season | Player | Nationality | Club | Ref |
|---|---|---|---|---|
| 2005–06 | Scott Golbourne | England | Bristol City | |
| 2006–07 | Joe Skarz | England | Huddersfield Town | |
| 2007–08 | Daniel Broadbent | England | Huddersfield Town | |
| 2008–09 | Tom Aldred | Scotland | Carlisle United | |
| 2009–10 | Tom Adeyemi | England | Norwich City | |
| 2010–11 | Dale Jennings | England | Tranmere Rovers | |
| 2011–12 | Jordan Cousins | Jamaica | Charlton Athletic | |
| 2012–13 | Luke James | England | Hartlepool United | |
| 2013–14 | Brendan Galloway | Zimbabwe | MK Dons | |
| 2014–15 | George Cooper | England | Crewe Alexandra | |
| 2015–16 | James Bree | England | Barnsley | |
| 2016–17 | Lewis Butroid | England | Scunthorpe United | |
| 2017–18 | Anthony Hartigan | England | AFC Wimbledon | |
| 2018–19 | Daniel Adshead | England | Rochdale | |
| 2019–20 | Luke Matheson | England | Rochdale | |
| 2020–21 | Lewis Johnson | England | MK Dons | |
| 2021–22 | Deji Elerewe | England | Charlton Athletic | |
| 2022–23 | Zach Mitchell | England | Charlton Athletic | |

=== League Two ===
| Season | Player | Nationality | Club | Ref |
|---|---|---|---|---|
| 2005–06 | Ikechi Anya | Scotland | Wycombe Wanderers | |
| 2006–07 | Joe Thompson | England | Rochdale | |
| 2007–08 | Ryan Bennett | England | Grimsby Town | |
| 2008–09 | Matt Phillips | Scotland | Wycombe Wanderers | |
| 2009–10 | Kyle Haynes | England | Cheltenham Town | |
| 2010–11 | Kadeem Harris | England | Wycombe Wanderers | |
| 2011–12 | Nick Powell | England | Crewe Alexandra | |
| 2012–13 | George Sykes | England | Barnet | |
| 2013–14 | Brad Walker | England | Hartlepool United | |
| 2014–15 | Conor Chaplin | England | Portsmouth | |
| 2015–16 | Ben Godfrey | England | York City | |
| 2016–17 | Myles Judd | England | Leyton Orient | |
| 2017–18 | Ben Wilmot | England | Stevenage | |
| 2018–19 | Arthur Iontton | England | Stevenage | |
| 2019–20 | Scott Pollock | England | Northampton Town | |
| 2020–21 | Felix Miles | England | Cheltenham Town | |
| 2021–22 | Junior Tchamadeu | England | Colchester United | |
| 2022–23 | Josh Tomlinson | England | Northampton Town | |

=== Winners by club ===
As of 2023 awards

| Club | Total |
|---|---|
| Charlton Athletic | 4 |
| Derby County | 3 |
| Rochdale | 3 |
| Wycombe Wanderers | 3 |
| Cardiff City | 2 |
| Cheltenham Town | 2 |
| Coventry City | 2 |
| Crewe Alexandra | 2 |
| Hartlepool United | 2 |
| Huddersfield Town | 2 |
| MK Dons | 2 |
| Northampton Town | 2 |
| Nottingham Forest | 2 |
| Sheffield Wednesday | 2 |
| Stevenage | 2 |
| AFC Wimbledon | 1 |
| Barnet | 1 |
| Barnsley | 1 |
| Birmingham City | 1 |
| Blackburn Rovers | 1 |
| Bristol City | 1 |
| Carlisle United | 1 |
| Colchester United | 1 |
| Crystal Palace | 1 |
| Fulham | 1 |
| Grimsby Town | 1 |
| Ipswich Town | 1 |
| Leeds United | 1 |
| Leyton Orient | 1 |
| Norwich City | 1 |
| Portsmouth | 1 |
| Scunthorpe United | 1 |
| Tranmere Rovers | 1 |
| York City | 1 |

=== Winners by nationality ===
As of 2023 awards

| Country | Total |
|---|---|
| England | 40 |
| Wales | 4 |
| Scotland | 3 |
| Bulgaria | 1 |
| Burundi | 1 |
| Chile | 1 |
| Jamaica | 1 |
| Nigeria | 1 |
| Republic of Ireland | 1 |
| Zimbabwe | 1 |
