= 2018–19 Shrewsbury Town F.C. season =

Shrewsbury Town F.C.
2018–19 season
- Chairman: Roland Wycherley
- Manager: John Askey (until 12 November); Sam Ricketts (from 3 December)
- Stadium: New Meadow
- League One: 18th
- FA Cup: Fourth round replay
- EFL Cup: First round
- EFL Trophy: Third round
- Top goalscorer: League: Fejiri Okenabirhie (10 goals); All: Fejiri Okenabirhie (16 goals)
- Highest home attendance: 9,503 vs Wolverhampton Wanderers
- Lowest home attendance: 1,379 vs Tranmere Rovers
- Average home league attendance: 6,429
- Biggest win: 6–0 (9 Oct 2018 vs. Tranmere Rovers, EFL Trophy)
- Biggest defeat: 0–3 (27 Oct 2018 at Oxford United) (12 Jan 2019 vs. Charlton Athletic) (2 Feb 2019 vs. Luton Town)
Home colours	Away colours	Third colours

The 2018–19 season was Shrewsbury Town's 133rd year in existence and their fourth consecutive season in League One. The club also participated in the FA Cup, the EFL Cup and the EFL Trophy.

The season covers the period from 1 July 2018 to 30 June 2019.

== Transfers ==
=== Transfers in ===
Date from	Position	Nationality	Name	From	Fee	Contract length	Ref.
1 July 2018	DF	(England)	Ryan Haynes	Coventry City	Undisclosed	2 years	
1 July 2018	DF	(England)	Kieran Kennedy	Macclesfield Town	Undisclosed	1 year	
1 July 2018	FW	(England)	Fejiri Okenabirhie	Dagenham & Redbridge	Undisclosed	2 years	
10 July 2018	FW	(England)	Alex Gilliead	Newcastle United	Free transfer	2 years	
13 July 2018	FW	(Wales)	Aaron Amadi-Holloway	Oldham Athletic	Undisclosed	2 years	
19 July 2018	GK	(England)	Steve Arnold	Barrow	Free transfer	2 years	
21 July 2018	MF	(England)	Doug Loft	Colchester United	Free transfer	1 year	
23 July 2018	MF	(England)	Josh Laurent	Wigan Athletic	Undisclosed	2 years	
2 August 2018	CM	(England)	Anthony Grant	Peterborough United	Undisclosed	1 year	
6 August 2018	CB	(England)	Luke Waterfall	Lincoln City	Undisclosed	3 years	
9 August 2018	CF	(England)	Lee Angol	Mansfield Town	Undisclosed	2 years	
9 August 2018	CM	(England)	Oliver Norburn	Tranmere Rovers	Undisclosed	3 years	
7 January 2019	CM	(Wales)	David Edwards	Reading	Free transfer	2½ years	
9 January 2019	CM	(England)	Brad Walker	Crewe Alexandra	Undisclosed	1½ years	
15 January 2019	GK	(England)	Reice Charles-Cook	(Denmark) SønderjyskE	Free transfer	½ year	
22 January 2019	DM	(France)	Romain Vincelot	Crawley Town	Undisclosed	1½ years	
30 January 2019	LB	(England)	Scott Golbourne	Bristol City	Free transfer	½ year	
30 January 2019	CB	(England)	Ro-Shaun Williams	Manchester United	Undisclosed	2½ years	

=== Transfers out ===
Date from	Position	Nationality	Name	To	Fee	Ref.
1 July 2018	LB	(England)	Junior Brown	Coventry City	Free transfer	
1 July 2018	CM	(Northern Ireland)	Chris Gallagher	(Northern Ireland) Glentoran	Released	
1 July 2018	CF	(England)	A-Jay Leitch-Smith	Morecambe	Released	
1 July 2018	GK	(England)	Craig MacGillivray	Portsmouth	Free transfer	
1 July 2018	CM	(England)	Abu Ogogo	Coventry City	Rejected contract	
1 July 2018	RB	(England)	Joe Riley	Plymouth Argyle	Free transfer	
1 July 2018	LB	(England)	Callum Roberts	(Wales) Newtown	Free transfer	
1 July 2018	LW	(England)	Alex Rodman	Bristol Rovers	Rejected contract	
1 July 2018	GK	(England)	Shaun Rowley	FC Halifax Town	Free transfer	
8 August 2018	CM	(England)	Jon Nolan	Ipswich Town	£2m (combined)	
8 August 2018	CB	(Democratic Republic of the Congo)	Aristote Nsiala	Ipswich Town	£2m (combined)	
9 August 2018	FW	(England)	Stefan Payne	Bristol Rovers	Undisclosed	
3 January 2019	CB	(Scotland)	Zak Jules	Macclesfield Town	Mutual consent	
10 January 2019	CB	(England)	Kieran Kennedy	(Wales) Wrexham	Free transfer	
11 January 2019	RB	(England)	Luke Hendrie	Grimsby Town	Undisclosed	
14 January 2019	DM	(England)	Bryn Morris	Portsmouth	Undisclosed	
21 January 2019	CF	(France)	Arthur Gnahoua	Carlisle United	Free transfer	

=== Loans in ===
Start date	Position	Nationality	Name	From	End date	Ref.
21 July 2018	MF	(England)	Charlie Colkett	Chelsea	31 December 2018	
27 July 2018	GK	(England)	Joel Coleman	Huddersfield Town	10 January 2019	
8 August 2018	MF	(Scotland)	Greg Docherty	(Scotland) Rangers	31 May 2019	
31 August 2018	RB	(England)	Josh Emmanuel	Ipswich Town	18 January 2019	
18 January 2019	CF	(England)	Sam Smith	Reading	31 May 2019	
31 January 2019	CF	(England)	Tyrese Campbell	Stoke City	31 May 2019	
31 January 2019	GK	(England)	Jonathan Mitchell	Derby County	31 May 2019	
31 January 2019	CF	(England)	Stefan Payne	Bristol Rovers	31 May 2019	

=== Loans out ===
Start date	Position	Nationality	Name	To	End date	Ref.
2 August 2018	RB	(Wales)	Ryan Sears	AFC Telford United	1 September 2018	
4 August 2018	CF	(England)	John McAtee	Ashton United	1 October 2018	
7 August 2018	DM	(England)	Bryn Morris	Wycombe Wanderers	1 January 2019	
18 August 2018	RB	(England)	Luke Hendrie	Grimsby Town	11 January 2019	
24 August 2018	AM	(Wales)	Sam Jones	Cheltenham Town	1 January 2019	
6 September 2018	GK	(England)	Cameron Gregory	Chippenham Town	October 2018	
19 September 2018	CM	(England)	George Hughes	Stalybridge Celtic	1 January 2019	
21 September 2018	CB	(Scotland)	Zak Jules	Barnet	2 January 2019	
21 September 2018	CB	(Cyprus)	Christos Shelis	Halesowen Town	October 2018	
26 September 2018	CF	(England)	John McAtee	AFC Telford United	October 2018	
29 September 2018	LB	(England)	Rhys Davies	Nuneaton Town	10 December 2018	
2 October 2018	GK	(England)	Cameron Gregory	Halesowen Town	November 2018	
10 November 2018	AM	(England)	Ryan Barnett	AFC Telford United	31 May 2019	
26 November 2018	CF	(France)	Arthur Gnahoua	AFC Fylde	14 January 2019	
21 December 2018	CF	(England)	John McAtee	Curzon Ashton	January 2019	
4 January 2019	CM	(England)	George Hughes	(Wales) Newtown	31 May 2019	
9 January 2019	CM	(England)	Brad Walker	(Wales) Wrexham	31 May 2019	
21 January 2019	CM	(England)	Doug Loft	Dagenham & Redbridge	31 May 2019	
29 January 2019	LM	(Sudan)	Abo Eisa	Colchester United	31 May 2019	
31 January 2019	CF	(England)	Lee Angol	Lincoln City	31 May 2019	

== Pre-season ==
=== Friendlies ===
Shrewsbury Town announced their first pre-season matches on 4 June 2018, with away trips to local rivals AFC Telford United and Port Vale. A home friendly was subsequently arranged with Brentford. The club's pre-season schedule was completed with an away fixture at Bristol City, and matches against Kidderminster Harriers and Burnley to be played behind closed doors.

11 July 2018 Friendly	Shrewsbury Town	3–0	Kidderminster Harriers	Lilleshall
13:00 BST	Okenabirhie 1', 30'; Eisa 12'			Stadium: Lilleshall Hall; Attendance: Behind closed doors

14 July 2018 Friendly	Bristol City	1–1	Shrewsbury Town	Bristol
13:00 BST	O'Dowda 15'	Report	Payne 20'	Stadium: Ashton Gate; Referee: Kevin Friend

17 July 2018 Friendly	Burnley	0–1	Shrewsbury Town	Gawthorpe Hall
13:00 BST		Report	Taylor (o.g.)	Stadium: Barnfield Training Centre; Attendance: Behind closed doors Referee: Jon Moss

21 July 2018 Friendly	Shrewsbury Town	2–3	Brentford	Shrewsbury
15:00 BST	Okenabirhie; Amadi-Holloway	Report	Forss; Nsiala (o.g.); Camargo	Stadium: New Meadow; Attendance: 1,334; Referee: Chris Sarginson

25 July 2018 Friendly	AFC Telford United	1–2	Shrewsbury Town	Wellington
19:45 BST	Morgan-Smith 8'	Report	Gnahoua 39'; Okenabirhie 66'	Stadium: New Bucks Head; Attendance: 1,061; Referee: Robert James

28 July 2018 Friendly	Port Vale	2–4	Shrewsbury Town	Burslem
15:00 BST	Rawlinson 32'; Pope 63'	Report	Whalley 36'; Amadi-Holloway 38', 49'; John-Lewis 77'	Stadium: Vale Park; Attendance: 996; Referee: Mark Heywood

== Competitions ==
=== League One ===
==== League table ====
Pos	Team	Pld	W	D	L	GF	GA	GD	Pts
16	Rochdale	46	15	9	22	54	87	−33	54
17	Wycombe Wanderers	46	14	11	21	55	67	−12	53
18	Shrewsbury Town	46	12	16	18	51	59	−8	52
19	Southend United	46	14	8	24	55	68	−13	50
20	AFC Wimbledon	46	13	11	22	42	63	−21	50

Source: EFL Official Website
Rules for classification: 1) Points; 2) Goal difference; 3) Number of goals scored; 4) Head-to-head results

==== Result summary ====
Overall								Home						Away					
Pld	W	D	L	GF	GA	GD	Pts	W	D	L	GF	GA	GD	W	D	L	GF	GA	GD
46	12	16	18	51	59	−8	52	8	9	6	25	25	0	4	7	12	26	34	−8

Last updated: 4 May 2019.

==== Results by round ====
Round	1	2	3	4	5	6	7	8	9	10	11	12	13	14	15	16	17	18	19	20	21	22	23	24	25	26	27	28	29	30	31	32	33	34	35	36	37	38	39	40	41	42	43	44	45	46
Ground	H	A	H	A	A	H	A	H	A	H	A	H	A	H	H	A	A	H	A	H	A	H	H	A	A	H	H	A	A	H	A	H	A	H	H	A	A	H	H	A	H	A	A	H	A	H
Result	L	L	D	D	L	D	D	W	L	D	D	W	L	L	W	L	W	W	L	W	L	D	W	L	D	D	L	D	L	L	D	D	W	W	D	L	L	W	L	W	D	W	L	L	D	D
Position	22	22	21	22	23	23	22	17	20	19	20	16	17	18	18	19	18	16	17	15	17	17	15	18	17	16	18	17	19	23	22	22	19	17	17	20	20	18	19	15	14	13	15	16	17	18

Updated to match(es) played on 4 May 2019. Source:
A = Away; H = Home; W = Win; D = Draw; L = Loss

==== Matches ====
On 21 June 2018, the League One fixtures for the forthcoming season were announced.

4 August 2018 1	Shrewsbury Town	0–1	Bradford City	Shrewsbury
15:00 BST		Report	Payne 19'	Stadium: New Meadow; Attendance: 7,625; Referee: Kevin Johnson

11 August 2018 2	Charlton Athletic	2–1	Shrewsbury Town	Charlton
15:00 BST	Taylor 62'; Ahearne-Grant 90+1'	Report	John-Lewis 83'	Stadium: The Valley; Attendance: 9,429; Referee: Craig Hicks

18 August 2018 3	Shrewsbury Town	0–0	Blackpool	Shrewsbury
15:00 BST		Report		Stadium: New Meadow; Attendance: 5,216; Referee: Ollie Yates

21 August 2018 4	Doncaster Rovers	0-0	Shrewsbury Town	Doncaster
19:45 BST	Wilks (yellow card) 37'	Report	Waterfall (yellow card) 39'	Stadium: Keepmoat Stadium; Attendance: 6,943; Referee: Darren Drysdale

25 August 2018 5	Luton Town	3–2	Shrewsbury Town	Luton
15:00 BST	Grant 51'; Stacey 73'; Lee 76'	Report	Whalley 32' (pen.); Angol 66'	Stadium: Kenilworth Road; Attendance: 8,518; Referee: Carl Boyeson

1 September 2018 6	Shrewsbury Town	1–1	Bristol Rovers	Shrewsbury
15:00 BST	Leadbitter 73' (o.g.)	Report	Payne 53' (pen.); Martin (red card) 59'	Stadium: New Meadow; Attendance: 5,759; Referee: Antony Coggins

8 September 2018 7	Portsmouth	1–1	Shrewsbury Town	Milton
15:00 BST	Pitman 87' (pen.)	Report	Docherty 74'	Stadium: Fratton Park; Attendance: 17,634; Referee: Charles Breakspear

15 September 2018 8	Shrewsbury Town	2–0	Southend United	Shrewsbury
15:00 BST	Docherty 5'; Angol 45+2'	Report		Stadium: New Meadow; Attendance: 5,651; Referee: Chris Sarginson

22 September 2018 9	Scunthorpe United	1–0	Shrewsbury Town	Scunthorpe
15:00 BST	Novak 55'	Report		Stadium: Glanford Park; Attendance: 3,784; Referee: Andy Haines

29 September 2018 10	Shrewsbury Town	2–2	Gillingham	Shrewsbury
15:00 BST	Angol 59'; Norburn 88'	Report	Hanlan 18'; Eaves 90'	Stadium: New Meadow; Attendance: 5,695; Referee: Ross Joyce

2 October 2018 11	Walsall	0–0	Shrewsbury Town	Walsall
19:45 BST		Report		Stadium: Bescot Stadium; Attendance: 4,555; Referee: Graham Salisbury

6 October 2018 12	Shrewsbury Town	1–0	Accrington Stanley	Shrewsbury
15:00 BST	Grant (yellow card) 56'; Gilliead 62'; Whalley (yellow card) 79'	Report	Ripley (red card) 16'; Clark (yellow card) 53'; Ihiekwe (yellow card) 70'; McConville (yellow card) 88'	Stadium: New Meadow; Attendance: 5,353; Referee: Andy Woolmer

13 October 2018 13	Fleetwood Town	2–1	Shrewsbury Town	Fleetwood
15:00 BST	Madden 19'; Burns 28'	Report	Norburn (yellow card) 3'; Laurent 57'; Waterfall (yellow card) 72'	Stadium: Highbury Stadium; Attendance: 2,983; Referee: Thomas Bramall

20 October 2018 14	Shrewsbury Town	0–2	Sunderland	Shrewsbury
15:00 BST		Report	Cattermole (yellow card) 13'; Beckles 58' (o.g.); O'Nien 84'	Stadium: New Meadow; Attendance: 9,007; Referee: John Busby

23 October 2018 15	Shrewsbury Town	3–1	Barnsley	Shrewsbury
19:45 BST	Docherty 2'; Norburn 23'; Waterfall 68'	Report	Pinnock 49'	Stadium: New Meadow; Attendance: 5,587; Referee: Scott Oldham

27 October 2018 16	Oxford United	3–0	Shrewsbury Town	Oxford
15:00 BST	Ruffels 3'; Whyte 14'; Browne 86'	Report		Stadium: Kassam Stadium; Attendance: 8,697 (594 away); Referee: Martin Coy

3 November 2018 17	AFC Wimbledon	1–2	Shrewsbury Town	Norbiton
15:00 GMT	Hanson 35'	Report	Waterfall 57', 89'	Stadium: Kingsmeadow; Attendance: 4,066; Referee: Lee Collins

17 November 2018 18	Shrewsbury Town	3–2	Rochdale	Shrewsbury
15:00 GMT	Norburn 32' (pen.), 72'; Okenabirhie 65'	Report	Camps (yellow card) 30'; Inman 45+1'; J. Williams 58'; Perkins (yellow card) 87'	Stadium: New Meadow; Attendance: 5,861; Referee: Lee Swabey

24 November 2018 19	Wycombe Wanderers	3–2	Shrewsbury Town	High Wycombe
15:00 GMT	El-Abd 11'; Jacobson 40'; Samuel 71'	Report	Amadi-Holloway 4'; Okenabirhie 73'	Stadium: Adams Park; Attendance: 4,598; Referee: Andy Haines

27 November 2018 20	Shrewsbury Town	2–0	Plymouth Argyle	Shrewsbury
19:45 GMT	Docherty 35'; Okenabirhie 68'	Report		Stadium: New Meadow; Attendance: 5,279; Referee: Matthew Donohue

8 December 2018 21	Burton Albion	2–1	Shrewsbury Town	Burton
15:00 GMT			Okenabirhie 90+5'	Stadium: Pirelli Stadium; Attendance: 3,062; Referee: Darren Drysdale

15 December 2018 22	Shrewsbury Town	2–2	Peterborough United	Shrewsbury
15:00 GMT	Docherty 2'; Okenabirhie 59'		Godden 12'; Tafazolli 90+2'	Stadium: New Meadow; Attendance: 5,393; Referee: Michael Salisbury

22 December 2018 23	Shrewsbury Town	1–0	Coventry City	Shrewsbury
15:00 GMT	Amadi-Holloway 49'; Grant (yellow card) 63'; Laurent (yellow card) 83'; Norburn (yellow card) 85'	Report	Clarke-Harris (yellow card) 86'	Stadium: New Meadow; Attendance: 8,083; Referee: Trevor Kettle

26 December 2018 24	Accrington Stanley	2-1	Shrewsbury Town	Accrington
15:00 GMT			Norburn 52'	Stadium: Crown Ground; Attendance: 3,061; Referee: Seb Stockbridge

29 December 2018 25	Sunderland	1–1	Shrewsbury Town	Sunderland
15:00 GMT	Maja 44'; Cattermole (yellow card) 58'; Baldwin (yellow card) 82'	Report	Waterfall 30'; Norburn (yellow card) 36'; Grant (yellow card) 37'; Docherty (yellow card) 43'; Haynes (yellow card) 87'	Stadium: Stadium of Light; Attendance: 33,288; Referee: Oliver Langford

1 January 2019 26	Shrewsbury Town	0–0	Fleetwood Town	Shrewsbury
15:00 GMT		Report		Stadium: New Meadow; Attendance: 5,919; Referee: Alan Young

12 January 2019 27	Shrewsbury Town	0–3	Charlton Athletic	Shrewsbury
15:00 GMT		Report	Taylor 26'; Bauer (yellow card) 29'; Pratley (yellow card) 49' (goal) 54'; Bielik (yellow card) 71'; Ahearne-Grant 79' (pen.)	Stadium: New Meadow; Attendance: 5,995; Referee: Anthony Backhouse

19 January 2019 28	Blackpool	0–0	Shrewsbury Town	Blackpool
15:00 GMT		Report		Stadium: Bloomfield Road; Attendance: 3,186; Referee: Eddie Ilderton

29 January 2019 29	Bradford City	4–3	Shrewsbury Town	Bradford
19:45 GMT	Grant 19' (o.g.); O'Brien 38'; Ball (yellow card) 45' (goal) 90+6'; Doyle 60'	Report	Okenabirhie 27', 76', 90+3' (pen.); Beckles (yellow card) 90'	Stadium: Valley Parade; Attendance: 14,906; Referee: Scott Oldham

2 February 2019 30	Shrewsbury Town	0–3	Luton Town	Shrewsbury
15:00 GMT	Grant (yellow card) 55'; Docherty (yellow card) 72'; Payne (yellow card) 73'; Golbourne (yellow card) 77'	Report	Collins 30', 69'; Pearson 53'; Ruddock Mpanzu (yellow card) 71'	Stadium: New Meadow; Attendance: 6,859; Referee: Graham Salisbury

9 February 2019 31	Bristol Rovers	1–1	Shrewsbury Town	Horfield
15:00 GMT	Partington (yellow card) 19'; Ogogo (yellow card) 24'; Rodman 53' (yellow card) 68'	Report	Norburn (yellow card) 24'; Whalley 36'; Golbourne (yellow card) 68'; Edwards (red card) 85'	Stadium: Memorial Stadium; Attendance: 8,322; Referee: Peter Wright

16 February 2019 32	Shrewsbury Town	1–1	Burton Albion	Shrewsbury
15:00 GMT	Campbell 8'; Bolton (yellow card) 15'; Williams (yellow card) 77'; Norburn (yellow card) 79'	Report	Templeton 11'; Harness (yellow card) 86'; Brayford (yellow card) 90+1'	Stadium: New Meadow; Attendance: 6,254; Referee: Seb Stockbridge

23 February 2019 33	Peterborough United	1–2	Shrewsbury Town	Peterborough
15:00 GMT	Naismith 10'; Toney (red card) 27'		Norburn 28' (pen.) (yellow card) 55' (yellow-red card) 62'; Campbell 36'; Beckles (yellow card) 65'; Okenabirhie (yellow card) 87'	Stadium: London Road; Attendance: 6,262; Referee: Kevin Johnson

26 February 2019 34	Shrewsbury Town	2–0	Doncaster Rovers	Shrewsbury
19:45 GMT	Waterfall (yellow card) 11'; Laurent 18'; Campbell 35'; Grant (yellow card) 39'; Sears (yellow card) 81'	Report	Rowe (yellow card) 86'	Stadium: New Meadow; Attendance: 5,394; Referee: Matt Donohue

2 March 2019 35	Shrewsbury Town	0–0	AFC Wimbledon	Shrewsbury
19:45 GMT				Stadium: New Meadow; Attendance: 6,166; Referee: Anthony Backhouse

9 March 2019 36	Rochdale	2–1	Shrewsbury Town	Rochdale
15:00 GMT	Ntlhe 15'; Ebanks-Landell (yellow card) 43'; McNulty 47' (yellow card) 87'; Bunney (yellow card) 55'	Report	Waterfall (yellow card) 40'; Williams (yellow card) 51'; Docherty 90+1'	Stadium: Spotland Stadium; Attendance: 3,217; Referee: John Brooks

12 March 2019 37	Plymouth Argyle	2–1	Shrewsbury Town	Plymouth
19:45 GMT	Ladapo 8'; Carey 89' (pen.)	Report	Whalley (yellow card) 37'; Norburn (penalty missed) 60' 60'; Grant (yellow card) 76'; Waterfall (yellow card) 86'	Stadium: Home Park; Attendance: 8,572; Referee: Brett Huxtable

16 March 2019 38	Shrewsbury Town	2–1	Wycombe Wanderers	Shrewsbury
15:00 GMT	Golbourne (yellow card) 39'; Norburn (yellow card) 76' (goal) 90+3' (pen.); Beckles 87' (yellow card) 90+6'	Report	McCarthy 67'; Jacobson (yellow card) 83'; Bean (yellow card) 90+4'	Stadium: New Meadow; Attendance: 6,001; Referee: Trevor Kettle

23 March 2019 39	Shrewsbury Town	0–2	Portsmouth	Shrewsbury
15:00 GMT	Grant (yellow card) 75'	Report	Close 40' (yellow card) 68'; Bogle (yellow card) 52'; Naylor (yellow card) 57'; Burgess (yellow card) 76'; Pitman 79'; Brown (yellow card) 81'	Stadium: New Meadow; Attendance: 8,028; Referee: Oliver Yates

30 March 2019 40	Southend United	0–2	Shrewsbury Town	Southend
15:00 GMT			Okenabirhie 50'; Waterfall 69'	Stadium: Roots Hall; Attendance: 6.818; Referee: Michael Salisbury

6 April 2019 41	Shrewsbury Town	1–1	Scunthorpe United	Shrewsbury
15:00 GMT	Hammill 84' (o.g.)	Report	Wootton 22'	Stadium: New Meadow; Attendance: 6,419; Referee: Paul Marsden

13 April 2019 42	Gillingham	0-2	Shrewsbury Town	Gillingham
15:00 GMT		Report	Bolton 50'; Campbell 61'	Stadium: Priestfield; Attendance: 4,109; Referee: Thomas Bramall

19 April 2019 43	Barnsley	2-1	Shrewsbury Town	Barnsley
15:00 GMT	Mowatt 23'; Brown 55'		Campbell 39'	Stadium: Oakwell; Attendance: 13,426; Referee: Scott Oldham

22 April 2019 44	Shrewsbury Town	2-3	Oxford United	Shrewsbury
15:00 GMT	Norburn 17' (pen.); Docherty 40'		Whyte 6', 72', 78'	Stadium: New Meadow; Attendance: 7,189; Referee: Chris Sarginson

28 April 2019 45	Coventry City	1–1	Shrewsbury Town	Coventry
15:00 BST	Shipley 16'	Report	Grant (yellow card) 29'; Okenabirhie 78'	Stadium: Ricoh Arena; Attendance: 13,549; Referee: Alan Young

4 May 2019 46	Shrewsbury Town	0-0	Walsall	Shrewsbury
17:30 BST				Stadium: New Meadow; Attendance: 9,135; Referee: Seb Stockbridge

=== FA Cup ===
The first round draw was made live on BBC by Dennis Wise and Dion Dublin on 22 October. The draw for the second round was made live on BBC and BT by Mark Schwarzer and Glenn Murray on 12 November. The third round draw was made live on BBC by Ruud Gullit and Paul Ince from Stamford Bridge on 3 December 2018. The fourth round draw was made live on BBC by Robbie Keane and Carl Ikeme from Wolverhampton on 7 January 2019.

11 November 2018 First round	Shrewsbury Town	1–1	Salford City	Shrewsbury
12:45 GMT	Norburn 25'	Report	Rooney 27'	Stadium: New Meadow; Attendance: 4,351; Referee: Ben Toner

21 November 2018 First round replay	Salford City	1–3	Shrewsbury Town	Salford
19:45 GMT	Rooney 77'	Report	Okenabirhie 33', 90+3'; Docherty 63'	Stadium: Moor Lane; Referee: Seb Stockbridge

2 December 2018 Second round	Shrewsbury Town	1–0	Scunthorpe United	Shrewsbury
14:00 GMT	Amadi-Holloway 35'	Report		Stadium: New Meadow; Attendance: 3,427; Referee: Neil Hair

5 January 2019 Third round	Shrewsbury Town	1–1	Stoke City	Shrewsbury
12:30 GMT	Norburn (yellow card) 31' (goal) 45+4' (pen.)	Report	Crouch 78'	Stadium: New Meadow; Attendance: 7,512; Referee: David Webb

15 January 2019 Third round replay	Stoke City	2–3	Shrewsbury Town	Stoke-on-Trent
19:45 GMT	Campbell 20', 36'; Etebo (yellow card) 33'; Adam (yellow card) 63'	Report	Bolton 71'; Okenabirhie 77' (pen.); Laurent (yellow card) 79' (goal) 81'; Arnold (yellow card) 90+1'	Stadium: Bet365 Stadium; Attendance: 10,261; Referee: Scott Duncan

26 January 2019 Fourth round	Shrewsbury Town	2–2	Wolverhampton Wanderers	Shrewsbury
15:00 GMT	Sadler (yellow card) 44'; Docherty 47' (yellow card) 62'; Grant (yellow card) 63'; Waterfall 71'	Report	Jiménez 75'; Doherty 90+3'	Stadium: New Meadow; Attendance: 9,503; Referee: Roger East

5 February 2019 Fourth round replay	Wolverhampton Wanderers	3–2	Shrewsbury Town	Wolverhampton
19:45 GMT	Doherty 2', 45+6'; Cavaleiro 62'	Report	Bolton 11'; Norburn (yellow card) 35'; Laurent 39'	Stadium: Molineux Stadium; Attendance: 28,844; Referee: Lee Probert

=== EFL Cup ===
On 15 June 2018, the draw for the first round was made in Vietnam.

14 August 2018 First round	Shrewsbury Town	1–2	Burton Albion	Shrewsbury
19:45 BST	Whalley 27'	Report	Templeton 45'; Akins 64' (pen.)	Stadium: New Meadow; Attendance: 2,708; Referee: Graham Salisbury

=== EFL Trophy ===
On 13 July 2018, the initial group stage draw bar the U21 invited clubs was announced. The draw for the second round was made live on Talksport by Leon Britton and Steve Claridge on 16 November. On 8 December, the third round draw was drawn by Alan McInally and Matt Le Tissier on Soccer Saturday.

Pos	Lge	Team	Pld	W	PW	PL	L	GF	GA	GD	Pts	Qualification
1	L1	Shrewsbury Town	3	2	1	0	0	9	2	+7	8	Round 2
2	ACA	Manchester City U21	3	2	0	1	0	6	2	+4	7	Round 2
3	L2	Crewe Alexandra	3	1	0	0	2	6	9	−3	3	
4	L2	Tranmere Rovers	3	0	0	0	3	3	11	−8	0	

Source: EFL.com

28 August 2018 Group stages	Shrewsbury Town	1–1 (3–1 p)	Manchester City U21	Shrewsbury
19:00 BST	Angol 51'	Report	Touaizi 90+2'	Stadium: New Meadow; Attendance: 1,838; Referee: Paul Marsden

9 October 2018 Group stages	Shrewsbury Town	6–0	Tranmere Rovers	Shrewsbury
19:00 BST	John-Lewis 11'; Docherty 18'; Beckles 23'; Okenabirhie 56', 74', 90+1'	Report		Stadium: New Meadow; Attendance: 1,379

13 November 2018 Group stages	Crewe Alexandra	1–2	Shrewsbury Town	Crewe
19:30 GMT	Bowery 79'	Report	Ray 20' (o.g.); Gilliead 63'	Stadium: Gresty Road; Attendance: 1,009

5 December 2018 Second round	Shrewsbury Town	2–1	Walsall	Shrewsbury
19:30 GMT	Gilliead 24'; Loft 72'	Report	Morris 77'	Stadium: New Meadow; Attendance: 1,857

8 January 2019 Third round	Port Vale	1–1 (4–3 p)	Shrewsbury Town	Burslem
19:45 GMT	Gibbons (yellow card) 51'; Rawlinson (yellow card) 60'; Pope 83'	Report	Rowland (yellow card) 39'; Sears 63'	Stadium: Vale Park; Attendance: 1,355; Referee: Eddie Ilderton
	Penalties
	Oyeleke (penalty scored); Miller (penalty scored); Pope (penalty missed); Kay (penalty scored); Hannant (penalty scored)		Okenabirhie (penalty scored); Gilliead (penalty missed); Angol (penalty scored); Eisa (penalty missed); Barnett (penalty scored)
