= Ryan Sears =

Welsh footballer

Personal information
- Full name: Ryan Joseph Sears
- Date of birth: 30 December 1998 (age 27)
- Place of birth: Newtown, Wales
- Position: Right back

Team information
- Current team: Caernarfon Town
- Number: 27

Youth career
- Shrewsbury Town

Senior career*
Years	Team	Apps	(Gls)
2016–2021	Shrewsbury Town	7	(0)
2017–2018	→ Newtown (loan)	31	(2)
2018	→ AFC Telford United (loan)	6	(0)
2020	→ AFC Telford United (loan)	1	(1)
2021–2022	Grimsby Town	6	(0)
2022–2024	Newtown	75	(6)
2024–	Caernarfon Town	70	(3)
- * Club domestic league appearances and goals as of 08:23, 8 November 2026 (UTC)

Ryan Joseph Sears (born 30 December 1998) is a Welsh footballer who plays as a right back for Cymru Premier club Caernarfon Town.

Sears came through the youth academy at Shrewsbury Town playing seven times for the club in EFL League One. He also spent time on loan with Welsh side Newtown as well as two separate spells with AFC Telford United before signing for Grimsby Town in June 2021 ahead of the 2021–22 season. Sears was called up to the Wales under-21 side in 2019 but failed to win a cap.

== Career ==
=== Shrewsbury Town ===
Born in Newtown, Powys, Wales, Sears was a youth player at Shrewsbury Town and scored twice to help them to the fourth round of the FA Youth Cup in 2016–17, while also being an unused substitute for the senior team in EFL League One three times around the turn of the year.

He was loaned to his hometown team Newtown A.F.C. in the Welsh Premier League for the 2017–18 season. He played 35 total games and scored three goals across all competitions, including one in a 4–2 win at reigning champions The New Saints on 30 December. He was voted the club's Players' Player of the Season.

On 2 August 2018, Sears was loaned for a month to Shrewsbury's neighbours A.F.C. Telford United in the National League North. After six games for the Bucks, he was recalled slightly ahead of schedule by Shrews manager John Askey, due to injury to starting right back James Bolton.

Sears made his professional debut on 1 September, playing the full 90 minutes of a 1–1 home draw with Bristol Rovers. After the game, Askey praised his performance as "perfect". He scored his first professional goal on 8 January 2019, opening a 1–1 draw at Port Vale in the EFL Trophy third round, which Shrewsbury lost on penalties.

In late April 2019, Sears signed a two-year contract extension with the option of a third year. However, he also suffered an anterior cruciate ligament injury in training, ruling him out for nine months. The following 14 March, he was loaned back to Telford for a month.

On 12 May 2021 it was announced that he would leave Shrewsbury at the end of the season, following the expiry of his contract.

=== Grimsby Town ===
On 9 June 2021, Sears joined Grimsby Town on a one-year contract, reuniting him with former Shrews boss Paul Hurst. On 9 January 2022, Sears left the club after his contract was terminated by mutual consent.

=== Newtown ===
On 9 January 2022, Sears rejoined Cymru Premier side Newtown on an 18-month contract.

=== Caernarfon Town ===
On 16 June 2024, following the expiry of his contract at Newtown, Sears joined fellow Cymru Premier side Caernarfon Town. He made his competitive debut for the club on 11 July 2024 in a 2–0 victory over Crusaders at Nantporth, in the first leg of Caernarfon's first qualifying round tie in the UEFA Conference League.

== International ==
In March 2019, Sears was called up for the first time to a Wales under-21 training camp in Monmouthshire.

== Honours ==
Caernarfon Town

- Welsh Cup: 2025–26

== Career statistics ==
As of match played 22 September 2020

Club	Season	League			National Cup		League Cup		Other		Total	
Club	Season	Division	Apps	Goals	Apps	Goals	Apps	Goals	Apps	Goals	Apps	Goals
Shrewsbury Town	2016–17	League One	0	0	0	0	0	0	0	0	0	0
Shrewsbury Town	2017–18	League One	0	0	0	0	0	0	0	0	0	0
Shrewsbury Town	2018–19	League One	5	0	1	0	0	0	4 (Note: Appearances and goals in the EFL Trophy)	1	10	1
Shrewsbury Town	2019–20	League One	2	0	0	0	0	0	0	0	2	0
Shrewsbury Town	2020–21	League One	0	0	0	0	0	0	1	0	1	0
Shrewsbury Town	Total		7	0	1	0	0	0	5	1	13	1
Newtown (loan)	2017–18	Welsh Premier League	31	2	4	0	3	1	0	0	38	3
AFC Telford United (loans)	2018–19	National League North	6	0	—		—		—		6	0
AFC Telford United (loans)	2019–20	National League North	1	1	—		—		—		1	1
AFC Telford United (loans)	Total		7	1	0	0	0	0	0	0	7	1
Career total			45	3	5	0	3	1	5	1	58	5
