= Brad Walker (footballer) =

English association football player

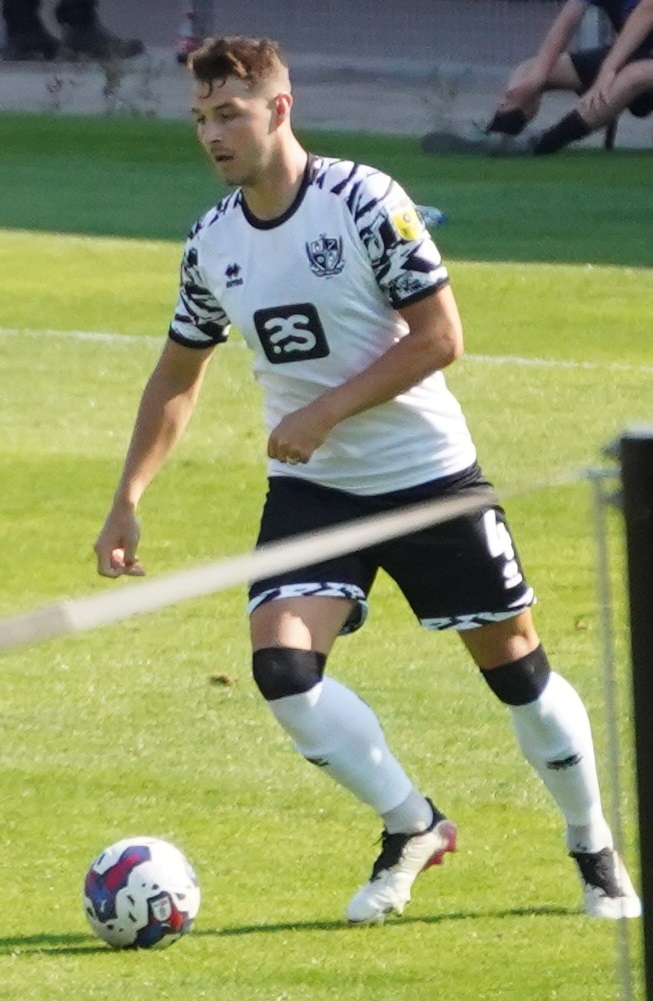
- Walker playing for Port Vale (August 2022)

Personal information
- Full name: Bradley Paul Walker
- Date of birth: 25 April 1996 (age 30)
- Place of birth: Billingham, England
- Height: 6 ft 1 in (1.85 m)
- Position: Defensive midfielder

Team information
- Current team: Darlington

Youth career
- 2009–2013: Hartlepool United

Senior career*
| Years | Team | Apps | (Gls) |
| 2013–2017 | Hartlepool United | 107 | (10) |
| 2017–2019 | Crewe Alexandra | 28 | (1) |
| 2018–2019 | → Wrexham (loan) | 18 | (4) |
| 2019–2021 | Shrewsbury Town | 38 | (1) |
| 2019 | → Wrexham (loan) | 8 | (0) |
| 2021–2023 | Port Vale | 35 | (1) |
| 2023–2025 | Tranmere Rovers | 40 | (0) |
| 2025–2026 | Hartlepool United | 18 | (0) |
| 2026– | Darlington | 0 | (0) |
- * Club domestic league appearances and goals as of 12:15, 15 August 2026 (UTC)

Bradley Paul Walker (born 25 April 1996) is an English professional footballer who plays as a defensive midfielder for National League North club Darlington.

Walker began his career at Hartlepool United, turning professional in July 2013 and making his first-team debut the following month. He made 123 appearances in all competitions for the club over the next four seasons before joining Crewe Alexandra in July 2017. He spent the 2018–19 season on loan at Wrexham in the National League despite switching from Crewe to Shrewsbury Town in January 2019. Finding first-team games hard to come by in the 2019–20 season, he began 2020–21 in good form before being sidelined with a serious ankle injury. Released by Shrewsbury, he signed with Port Vale in June 2021. He spent 18 months with the club before being sold to Tranmere Rovers in January 2023. In June 2025, he rejoined Hartlepool United, now playing non-League football, before signing for National League North side Darlington in August 2026.

== Early and personal life ==
Walker was born in Billingham, County Durham and attended Northfield School & Sports College. He joined Hartlepool United at the age of 13 and would make the 12-mile round trip to Victoria Park on his bicycle. Walker has two daughters and one son, as of 2023.

== Club career ==
=== Hartlepool United ===
He signed a professional contract with Hartlepool United in July 2013. He made his Football League debut on 3 August 2013, in a 3–0 defeat away at Rochdale. He scored his first career goal in a 1–1 draw with Burton Albion on 21 December. He said it was a "very bizarre feeling and one I was very proud with". Having scored 3 goals in 42 appearances, Walker won the Football League Apprentice of the Year award for League Two in the 2013–14 season; upon winning the award he thanked his friends and family for their support. Hartlepool manager Colin Cooper rated him as the best player he had seen for his age.

The 2014–15 season saw a loss of form for Walker and most of the Hartlepool team in general, with manager Colin Cooper and his successor Paul Murray both dismissed before Christmas. He ended the season with 5 goals from 32 games. Walker then fell out of manager Ronnie Moore's first-team plans in the 2015–16 season and spent time on trial at Wolverhampton Wanderers; no move to Wolves transpired though he continued to be linked to the club as late as summer 2017. Though not named in new manager Craig Hignett's first matchday squads in February, he was soon reintroduced to the first-team after impressing in training, with Hignett crediting his upturn in form to "love", saying "Brad knows what I think of him and I just felt in training that he was starting to be his old self again". He would go on to feature in 27 competitive matches by the end of the season.

Walker did not play a league game in the first half of the 2016–17 season, despite Hignett hinting at a possible inclusion in November. He earned his first start of the season under caretaker manager Sam Collins in January, being named as man of the match in a win over Stevenage, and retained his first-team place under new manager Dave Jones. He also filled in at centre-back following an injury crisis in defence, earning him praise from Jones. He turned down the offer of a new contract from newly appointed manager Craig Harrison following the club's relegation out of the Football League at the end of the season and was linked with moves to Wolverhampton Wanderers and Wigan Athletic. In total, he scored 10 goals in 123 appearances for Hartlepool.

=== Crewe Alexandra ===
Walker signed a two-year deal to join Crewe Alexandra after the League Two club paid Hartlepool an undisclosed compensation package on 4 July 2017. He scored his first goal for the club in a 2–1 win over Rotherham United on 4 November, in an FA Cup first round tie at Gresty Road. He scored his first league goal for Crewe in a 2–0 home win over Grimsby Town on 1 January 2018. His first season at the club was described as "mixed" as he started well but transitioned from central midfield to centre-back and ended the campaign finding gametime limited after struggling with injury problems. Walker said that he found it difficult to move away from his hometown club as his partner was expecting a child.

Walker joined National League club Wrexham on a six-month loan starting on 30 August 2018. He scored his first goal for the club with a penalty in a 1–1 draw at Chesterfield on 27 October. Walker said that he was enjoying his football at the Racecourse Ground and that "I lost all interest in it really" after falling out of favour at Crewe earlier in the year. However, Crewe manager David Artell commented that if Wrexham wanted to keep Walker they would have to sign him permanently as he otherwise expected the player to return to Cheshire in January with "fire in his belly". Walker did not return though as he was sold to a new club whilst his loan spell was ongoing.

=== Shrewsbury Town ===
On 9 January 2019, Walker signed for Shrewsbury Town, and was loaned back to Wrexham for the remainder of the 2018–19 season. He was brought to the New Meadow by Sam Ricketts, who had managed Wrexham in the first half of the season, whilst Wrexham were now managed by his former assistant Graham Barrow. The loan spell was ended early in March after he picked up a hamstring injury; he had made a total of 32 appearances for Wrexham, scoring 4 goals. Walker finally made his debut for Shrewsbury on 10 August, the second game of the 2019–20 season, coming on as a 79th-minute substitute during a 1–0 defeat at Milton Keynes Dons. He scored his first goal for Shrewsbury in a 3–1 home win over Macclesfield Town in an EFL Trophy tie on 13 November. He scored 2 goals in 23 appearances throughout the season, which was curtailed early due to the COVID-19 pandemic in England.

After working hard on his fitness during England's first COVID-19 lockdown, he finally forced his way into the starting eleven following injuries to David Edwards and Sean Goss. He was described as "Sam Ricketts' surprise package" in the early stages of the 2020–21 season after putting in a series of strong performances and said he had regained his confidence after a difficult initial season at the club. Ricketts was dismissed and Walker injured his ankle in new manager Steve Cotterill's first game and was sidelined for three months. Walker left Shrewsbury at the end of the season, following the expiry of his contract.

=== Port Vale ===
On 2 June 2021, Walker agreed a two-year deal with League Two club Port Vale, becoming Darrell Clarke's first signing as manager. He started the first five league games of the 2021–22 season before he struggled with a knee injury, which required an injection and time to heal. He returned to the midfield three upon his recovery, though was also asked to play in the middle of a central defensive three at times due to his expansive passing range. He was praised by acting manager Andy Crosby for his performances towards the end of the campaign. He scored his first goal for the "Valiants" on 9 April, as his "stunning long-range winner" secured a 3–2 win over Oldham Athletic at Vale Park. The club were promoted into League One at the end of the season via the play-offs, with Walker playing 28 league games and scoring once. However, due to strong competition in the central midfield area, he was limited to four league starts and six other appearances in the first half of the 2022–23 season. Speaking upon his departure in January 2023, director of football David Flitcroft said that "Brad is a player that wants game time and wants minutes... he hasn't been getting the game time he wants due to the form of other players". He had been linked with a return to Hartlepool United, which was a rumour dismissed by manager Keith Curle.

=== Tranmere Rovers ===
On 12 January 2023, Walker joined EFL League Two side Tranmere Rovers for an undisclosed fee, signing a two-and-a-half-year contract; manager Micky Mellon said that "for a while we've been looking for players of Brad's size and physicality in the midfield areas". He made two starts and two substitute appearances in the second half of the 2022–23 season. He started the 2023–24 campaign strongly under new manager Nigel Adkins after undergoing an injury operation in the summer. On 17 February, he got two assists in a 4–0 win over league leaders Stockport County. He played 31 games in the season. In October 2024, Walker received a three-match ban for violent conduct following an incident in the 51st minute of Rovers' 3–1 defeat at previous club Crewe Alexandra. He picked up a hamstring injury in the new year that required surgery and saw him ruled out for the second half of the 2024–25 season. He entered contract negotiations with the club at the end of the campaign.

=== Return to Hartlepool United ===
On 27 June 2025, it was announced that he would rejoin Hartlepool United, now in the National League, upon the expiry of his Tranmere contract. He was Simon Grayson's first signing as manager. He did not feature after Nicky Featherstone replaced Grayson as manager in October, though Featherstone revealed in January that this was because Walker had torn his calf muscle. He played 18 league games in the 2025–26 season, 14 of these as a substitute. He was released upon the expiry of his contract.

=== Darlington ===
On 15 August 2026, Walker signed a short-term deal with National League North side Darlington as manager Steve Watson felt "his experience is exactly what we need".

== International career ==
Walker was called up for England under-18s training camps in November and December 2013. However, he was not called up for the under-18's next fixture in February 2014.

== Style of play ==
Walker is a defensive, ball-playing central midfielder, though can also play as part of a three at centre-back. He is known for having good ball control, long-range shooting and passing skills. He has had success with free kicks and the knuckleball dead ball technique.

== Career statistics ==
As of match played 25 April 2026

Appearances and goals by club, season and competition
| Club | Season | League | | | FA Cup | | League Cup | | Other | | Total | |
| Club | Season | Division | Apps | Goals | Apps | Goals | Apps | Goals | Apps | Goals | Apps | Goals |
|---|---|---|---|---|---|---|---|---|---|---|---|---|
| Hartlepool United | 2012–13 | League One | 0 | 0 | — | | — | | — | | 0 | 0 |
| Hartlepool United | 2013–14 | League Two | 36 | 3 | 2 | 0 | 1 | 0 | 3 (Note: Appearance(s) in Football League Trophy) | 0 | 42 | 3 |
| Hartlepool United | 2014–15 | League Two | 28 | 5 | 2 | 0 | 1 | 0 | 1 | 0 | 32 | 5 |
| Hartlepool United | 2015–16 | League Two | 23 | 1 | 3 | 0 | 1 | 0 | 0 | 0 | 27 | 1 |
| Hartlepool United | 2016–17 | League Two | 20 | 1 | 0 | 0 | 0 | 0 | 2 (Note: Appearances in EFL Trophy) | 0 | 22 | 1 |
| Hartlepool United | Total | | 107 | 10 | 7 | 0 | 3 | 0 | 6 | 0 | 123 | 10 |
| Crewe Alexandra | 2017–18 | League Two | 27 | 1 | 2 | 1 | 1 | 0 | 3 | 0 | 33 | 2 |
| Crewe Alexandra | 2018–19 | League Two | 1 | 0 | 0 | 0 | 0 | 0 | 0 | 0 | 1 | 0 |
| Crewe Alexandra | Total | | 28 | 1 | 2 | 1 | 1 | 0 | 3 | 0 | 34 | 2 |
| Wrexham (loan) | 2018–19 | National League | 26 | 4 | 4 | 0 | — | | 2 (Note: Appearances in FA Trophy) | 0 | 32 | 4 |
| Shrewsbury Town | 2018–19 | League One | 0 | 0 | 0 | 0 | — | | — | | 0 | 0 |
| Shrewsbury Town | 2019–20 | League One | 15 | 0 | 3 | 1 | 1 | 0 | 4 | 1 | 23 | 2 |
| Shrewsbury Town | 2020–21 | League One | 23 | 1 | 1 | 1 | 1 | 0 | 2 | 0 | 27 | 2 |
| Shrewsbury Town | Total | | 38 | 1 | 4 | 2 | 2 | 0 | 6 | 1 | 50 | 4 |
| Port Vale | 2021–22 | League Two | 28 | 1 | 3 | 0 | 1 | 0 | 3 | 0 | 35 | 1 |
| Port Vale | 2022–23 | League One | 7 | 0 | 0 | 0 | 1 | 0 | 2 | 1 | 10 | 1 |
| Port Vale | Total | | 35 | 1 | 3 | 0 | 2 | 0 | 5 | 1 | 45 | 2 |
| Tranmere Rovers | 2022–23 | League Two | 4 | 0 | — | | — | | — | | 4 | 0 |
| Tranmere Rovers | 2023–24 | League Two | 28 | 0 | 1 | 0 | 0 | 0 | 2 | 0 | 31 | 0 |
| Tranmere Rovers | 2024–25 | League Two | 8 | 0 | 0 | 0 | 2 | 0 | 2 | 0 | 12 | 0 |
| Tranmere Rovers | Total | | 40 | 0 | 1 | 0 | 2 | 0 | 4 | 0 | 47 | 0 |
| Hartlepool United | 2025–26 | National League | 18 | 0 | 2 | 0 | — | | 0 | 0 | 20 | 0 |
| Darlington | 2026–27 | National League North | 0 | 0 | 0 | 0 | — | | 0 | 0 | 0 | 0 |
| Career total | | | 292 | 17 | 23 | 3 | 10 | 0 | 26 | 2 | 351 | 22 |

== Honours ==
Individual

- Football League Apprentice of the Year (League Two): 2013–14
