= James H. Rowland =

American football and basketball coach, college athletics administrator, and lawyer

Biographical details
- Born: January 9, 1909
- Died: January 4, 1991 (aged 85)

Playing career

Football
- c. 1930: Cheyney

Coaching career (HC unless noted)

Football
- 1935–1940: Bluefield State
- 1941–1942: Howard

Basketball
- 1935–1941: Bluefield State

Administrative career (AD unless noted)
- 1935–1941: Bluefield State

Head coaching record
- Overall: 24–27–16 (football)
- Bowls: 0–1

James Henry Rowland Sr. (January 9, 1909 – January 4, 1991) was an American football and basketball coach, college athletics administrator, and lawyer. He served as the head football coach at Bluefield State Teachers College—now known as Bluefield State College—in Bluefield, West Virginia from 1935 to 1940 and Howard University in Washington, D.C. from 1941 to 1942, compiling a career college football coaching record of 24–27–16. Rowland was also the head basketball coach at Bluefield State from 1935 to 1941.

Rowland graduated from William Penn High School in Harrisburg, Pennsylvania and attended Cheyney State Teacher's College—now known as Cheyney University of Pennsylvania—where he played varsity football and basketball and ran track. He then moved on to Ohio State University. There he was member a of the freshmen and reserve football teams and ran track before earning a Bachelor of Science and a Master of Arts in education. Rowland was grade school principal in Mecklenburg County, Virginia before Bluefield State, where he was also athletic director, boxing coach, and assistant professor.

Rowland later practiced law in Harrisburg, and was a member of the Pennsylvania Board of Education.

== Head coaching record ==
=== Football ===
Year	Team	Overall	Conference	Standing	Bowl/playoffs
Bluefield State Big Blues (Colored Intercollegiate Athletic Association) (1935–1940)
1935	Bluefield State	6–3	6–2	3rd	
1936	Bluefield State	3–2–4	3–0–3	3rd	
1937	Bluefield State	1–5–3	1–3–2	7th	
1938	Bluefield State	4–3–2	3–3–2	5th	
1939	Bluefield State	4–1–4	4–1–3	2nd	
1940	Bluefield State	2–6–1	2–4–1	7th	
Bluefield State:		20–20–14	19–13–11		
Howard Bison (Colored Intercollegiate Athletic Association) (1941–1942)
1941	Howard	3–3	1–3	NA	
1942	Howard	1–4–2	0–3	11th	
Howard:		4–7–2	1–6		
Total:		24–27–16			
