= Roland Wycherley =

English businessman (born 1941)

Roland Edward Wycherley MBE (born 29 June 1941) is an English businessman who was chairman and owner of English Football League club Shrewsbury Town F.C. from 1996 to 2026. During his ownership, the club moved to the New Meadow in 2007. In 2021, he announced his desire to sell; by 2025 he was the oldest and longest-serving owner in the league.

== Biography ==
Wycherley was born in the Castlefields neighbourhood of Shrewsbury and made his fortune in vending machines. He founded the Midshires Group in 1972 and sold it to Bunzl in 2006.

Wycherley first became involved with Football League club Shrewsbury Town by sponsoring an advertising board at Gay Meadow, before becoming associate director in 1994 and vice chairman. In July 1996, Wycherley bought the club, which was £750,000 in debt. In October 1997 he sold defender Dave Walton to Crewe Alexandra for £500,000; Wycherley reflected in 2012 that this decision saved the club from extinction. In 2003, the club was relegated to the Conference and Wycherley offered his resignation; he remained and the club was promoted back to the Football League a year later.

Under Wycherley's ownership, the club moved from Gay Meadow to the New Meadow in July 2007. That November, the east stand of the new stadium was named after him. The new 10,000-seater stadium saw a rise in attendance and avoided the flood risk of the previous ground.

Wycherley was named a Member of the Order of the British Empire (MBE) in the 2021 New Year Honours, for services to the community in Shrewsbury. He received his award from Queen Elizabeth II in December 2021.

In October 2021, after turning 80, Wycherley announced he was searching for a successor. Several approaches to buy the club off him fell through – in September 2024, he had indicated a sale of the club was imminent – but by October 2025 he was the oldest and longest-serving owner in the league. He said that month that he and his autistic grandson had been harassed over the club's relegation and poor start in EFL League Two. A year later, in September 2026, unhappy Shrewsbury fans issued an ultimatum to Wycherley to answer questions about the continually delayed sale of the club; almost immediately, on 7 September, the club's impending sale to an American consortium was announced. On 9 November, the takeover was completed.
