= Scott Golbourne =

English footballer (born 1988)

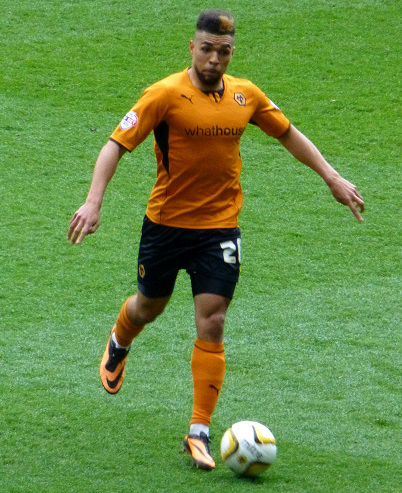
- Golbourne playing for Wolverhampton Wanderers in 2014

Personal information
- Full name: Juliou Scott Golbourne
- Date of birth: 29 February 1988 (age 38)
- Place of birth: Bristol, England
- Height: 5 ft 8 in (1.73 m)
- Position: Left back

Youth career
- 2002–2005: Bristol City

Senior career*
Years	Team	Apps	(Gls)
2005–2006	Bristol City	14	(0)
2006–2009	Reading	2	(0)
2006	→ Wycombe Wanderers (loan)	15	(1)
2007	→ Wycombe Wanderers (loan)	19	(0)
2007–2008	→ AFC Bournemouth (loan)	5	(0)
2009	→ Oldham Athletic (loan)	8	(0)
2009–2012	Exeter City	104	(2)
2012–2013	Barnsley	47	(2)
2013–2016	Wolverhampton Wanderers	87	(1)
2016–2018	Bristol City	35	(0)
2017–2018	→ Milton Keynes Dons (loan)	25	(0)
2019–2021	Shrewsbury Town	40	(1)
Total		401	(7)

International career
2004–2005	England U17	16	(0)
2005–2007	England U19	7	(0)
- * Club domestic league appearances and goals

Juliou Scott Golbourne (born 29 February 1988) is an English former footballer who played as a defender.

Golbourne's previous clubs include Bristol City, Wolverhampton Wanderers, Barnsley, Exeter City and Reading with brief loan spells for Wycombe Wanderers, AFC Bournemouth, Oldham Athletic, Milton Keynes Dons and Shrewsbury Town.

He has previously been capped for the England national team at U17 and U19 levels.

== Club career ==
=== Bristol City ===
Born in Bristol, Golbourne joined his Bristol City's youth system in 2002, at age 15, after winning a scholarship to the club's academy. He began his career within the youth system as a left-sided midfielder. After four years in the youth system, Golbourne made his first-team debut for Bristol City in a 2–0 victory over Colchester United, coming on for Luke Wilkshire in the 72nd minute. On 23 August 2005, he made his League Cup debut in a 4–2 loss to Barnet in the first round. However, after two seasons with the club, Golbourne left his hometown club for Reading in January 2006 for an undisclosed fee.

=== Reading ===
Less than 24 hours after a transfer to Reading, Golbourne made his reserves debut for the Royals in a 6–0 rout of Millwall's reserves. Golbourne was awarded the League One Apprentice of the Year Award in March 2006 for his actions on the pitch, as well as his educational achievements. On 17 April, after several months in reserves, he made his Reading first-team debut—a 3–1 win over Stoke City.

After only two appearances in two seasons, Golbourne was made available for a loan by Reading boss Steve Coppell. On 16 August 2006, he was loaned to League Two club Wycombe Wanderers for one month. He was immediately made available for the first-team squad, making his debut on 19 August in a 3–0 victory over Bury. Just days before his initial return to Reading, Golbourne extended his stay at Adams Park with a two-month loan extension, after making four appearances for the Blues in his original loan deal. On 25 August 2006, despite a 3–1 loss to Lincoln City, Golbourne was named Man of the Match by the game's sponsor for his efforts in defence and midfield. His first ever league goal came on 18 November 2006, in a 1–1 draw with Grimsby Town. However, the goal came in Golbourne's final match on his loan to Wycombe, as he returned to Reading just days later. Within several days of his return to Reading, he was immediately loaned back to Wycombe on a loan deal which lasted until the end of the 2006–07 season, immediately making his way back into the starting line-up in a 1–0 win over Chester City.

On 25 August 2007, Golbourne made his Premier League debut for Reading, in a 3–0 loss to Bolton Wanderers. However, he was subbed off the 63rd minute for Bobby Convey. Three days later, he featured in Reading's 1–0 win over Swansea City, coming on in extra time in the 99th minute.

After his return to Reading, Golbourne was again loaned out in November 2007, when he joined League One club AFC Bournemouth on a month's loan. On 6 November, he made his Bournemouth debut in a 3–1 defeat to Leeds United. His first goal for Bournemouth, and the third of his career, came on 20 November in a 3–2 FA Cup victory over Barrow, when he netted the opening goal in the 43rd minute. In mid-December, His loan with Bournemouth was extended until 12 January 2008.

On 19 January 2009, Golbourne was loaned out to League One side Oldham Athletic on a one-month loan. He was handed his debut on 23 January versus Stockport County in a 3–1 Oldham win. On 23 March, Golbourne left Oldham and returned to Reading, after manager Joe Royle decided against extending the loan.

=== Exeter City ===
Golbourne signed for Exeter City on 2 July after agreeing a one-year contract with the newly promoted League One club. He ended speculation over his future by signing a new two-year contract with Exeter City in June 2010.

=== Barnsley ===
On 30 January 2012 Golbourne joined Championship side Barnsley on a two-and-a-half-year contract for an undisclosed fee. He made his debut on 4 February, scoring a consolation goal in a 2–1 defeat to Watford. He became a regular first team player for the club, but missed the final months of the 2012–13 season with a knee injury. In total he made 53 appearances for the club during an eighteen-month stay.

=== Wolverhampton Wanderers ===
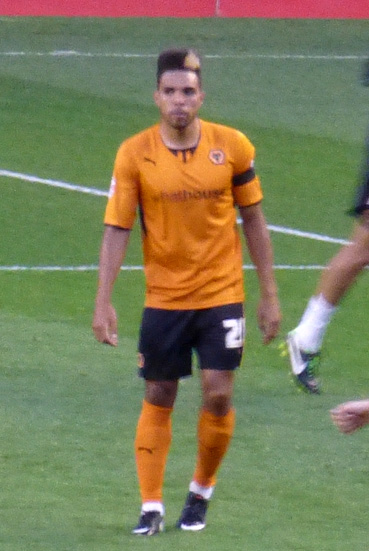
Golbourne playing for Wolverhampton Wanderers in 2013

On 30 August 2013 Golbourne moved to Wolverhampton Wanderers of League One on a three-year deal for an undisclosed fee (reportedly £700,000). He made his club debut on 31 August 2013 in a 3–1 win at Port Vale, and scored what to be his only goal for the club in a 3–2 win against Swindon in his second league appearance. Golbourne was an almost ever-present part of the Wolves team that ended the season as League One champions with a record points total for that level.

Back in the Championship, Golbourne remained a regular part of Wolves' plans but a foot injury hampered him throughout the 2014–15 season, restricting his appearances and his performance level. With only a year remaining on his contract, talks were opened but no negotiation reached by midpoint of the season when he fell out of the starting line-up and would be sold during the January 2016 window. In total he made 92 appearances for Wolves, scoring once.

=== Return to Bristol City ===
On 28 January 2016, Golbourne moved back to Bristol City, where he had played ten years prior, for an undisclosed fee in a 2 1/2-year deal. He was released by Bristol City at the end of the 2017–18 season.

=== Shrewsbury Town ===
On 30 January 2019, Golbourne signed a short-term deal until the end of the season for League One side Shrewsbury Town, after impressing on trial. He signed a two-year contract extension in summer 2019. He scored his first goal for the club in an EFL Trophy tie against Manchester City U21s on 3 December 2019, though later in the game missed the decisive penalty in the shootout.

On 12 May 2021 it was announced that he would leave Shrewsbury at the end of the season, following the expiry of his contract. Golbourne announced his retirement from professional football at the end of the 2020–21 season, in order to focus on his business interests.

== International career ==
In November 2004, Golbourne was called up for England's under-17 team in the 2004 International Under-17 Youth Tournament. He made his international debut in a 1–0 victory over Sweden under-17 on 4 August 2004.

== Retirement ==
Since retiring in 2021, Golbourne has become a property developer, in conjunction with his best friend Cameron Wright, focussing particularly on social housing.

== Career statistics ==
Appearances and goals by club, season and competition
Club	Season	League			FA Cup		League Cup		Other		Total	
Club	Season	Division	Apps	Goals	Apps	Goals	Apps	Goals	Apps	Goals	Apps	Goals
Bristol City	2004–05	League One	9	0	0	0	0	0	0	0	9	0
Bristol City	2005–06	League One	5	0	0	0	1	1	0	0	6	1
Bristol City	Total		14	0	0	0	1	1	0	0	15	1
Reading	2005–06	Championship	1	0	0	0	0	0	—		1	0
Reading	2006–07	Premier League	0	0	1	0	0	0	—		1	0
Reading	2007–08	Premier League	1	0	0	0	1	0	—		2	0
Reading	2008–09	Championship	0	0	0	0	2	0	0	0	2	0
Reading	Total		2	0	1	0	3	0	0	0	6	0
Wycombe Wanderers (loan)	2006–07	League Two	34	1	0	0	4	0	1 (Note: Appearance(s) in Football League Trophy)	0	39	1
AFC Bournemouth (loan)	2007–08	League One	5	0	2	1	0	0	1	0	8	1
Oldham Athletic (loan)	2008–09	League One	8	0	0	0	0	0	0	0	8	0
Exeter City	2009–10	League One	34	0	2	0	1	0	1	0	38	0
Exeter City	2010–11	League One	44	2	1	0	1	0	5	0	51	2
Exeter City	2011–12	League One	26	0	2	0	2	0	2	0	32	0
Exeter City	Total		104	2	5	0	4	0	8	0	121	2
Barnsley	2011–12	Championship	12	1	0	0	0	0	—		12	1
Barnsley	2012–13	Championship	31	1	3	0	1	0	—		35	1
Barnsley	2013–14	Championship	4	0	0	0	2	0	—		6	0
Barnsley	Total		47	2	3	0	3	0	0	0	53	2
Wolverhampton Wanderers	2013–14	League One	40	1	2	1	0	0	2	0	44	2
Wolverhampton Wanderers	2014–15	Championship	27	0	0	0	0	0	—		27	0
Wolverhampton Wanderers	2015–16	Championship	20	0	0	0	1	0	—		21	0
Wolverhampton Wanderers	Total		87	1	2	1	1	0	2	0	92	2
Bristol City	2015–16	Championship	16	0	0	0	—		—		16	0
Bristol City	2016–17	Championship	19	0	1	0	4	0	—		24	0
Bristol City	Total		35	0	1	0	4	0	0	0	40	0
Milton Keynes Dons (loan)	2017–18	League One	25	0	1	0	0	0	1 (Note: Appearance(s) in EFL Trophy)	0	27	0
Shrewsbury Town	2018–19	League One	15	0	—		—		—		15	0
Shrewsbury Town	2019–20	League One	15	1	7	0	1	0	4	1	27	2
Shrewsbury Town	2020–21	League One	10	0	2	0	1	0	3	0	16	0
Shrewsbury Town	Total		40	1	9	0	2	0	7	1	58	2
Career total			401	7	24	2	22	1	20	1	467	11

== Honours ==
Wolverhampton Wanderers

- Football League One: 2013–14

Individual

- Football League Apprentice of the Year: 2005–06
- League One Team of the Season: 2013–14
