= James Rowland (footballer) =

English footballer

Personal information
- Full name: James Thomas Rowland
- Date of birth: 3 December 2001 (age 24)
- Place of birth: Walsall, England
- Height: 1.65 m (5 ft 5 in)
- Position: Midfielder

Team information
- Current team: Whitchurch Alport
- Number: 8

Youth career
- West Bromwich Albion
- Shrewsbury Town

Senior career*
Years	Team	Apps	(Gls)
2018–2021	Shrewsbury Town	0	(0)
2020	→ Aberystwyth Town (loan)	3	(0)
2020	→ Barwell (loan)	4	(0)
2021–2022	Newtown	12	(0)
2022	→ Barwell (loan)	13	(0)
2022–	Whitchurch Alport	19	(0)
- * Club domestic league appearances and goals as of 20:06, 9 April 2023 (UTC)

James Thomas Rowland (born 3 December 2001) is an English footballer who plays as a midfielder for Midland Football League club Whitchurch Alport.

== Career ==
=== Shrewsbury Town ===
Rowland played youth football with West Bromwich Albion before joining Shrewsbury Town. He made his debut on 13 November 2018 in the group stage of the EFL Trophy, as a 67th-minute substitute for Charlie Colkett in a 2–1 win at Crewe Alexandra.

He was given his first professional contract by Shrewsbury in May 2019.

On 25 January 2020, Rowland joined Aberystwyth Town on loan for the remainder of the 2019–20 season.

He moved on loan to Barwell in October 2020.

On 12 May 2021 it was announced that he would leave Shrewsbury at the end of the season, following the expiry of his contract.

=== Newtown ===
Following his release from Shrewsbury, Rowland signed for Cymru Premier side Newtown. In January 2022, Rowland was loaned out to his former club, Barwell, until the end of the season.

=== Whitchurch Alport ===
In July 2022, Rowland joined Midland Football League club Whitchurch Alport.

== Career statistics ==
As of match played 31 October 2020

Appearances and goals by club, season and competition
Club	Season	League			National Cup		League Cup		Other		Total	
Club	Season	Division	Apps	Goals	Apps	Goals	Apps	Goals	Apps	Goals	Apps	Goals
Shrewsbury Town	2018–19	League One	0	0	0	0	0	0	2 (Note: Appearances in the EFL Trophy)	0	2	0
Shrewsbury Town	2019–20	League One	0	0	0	0	1	0	0	0	1	0
Shrewsbury Town	2020–21	League One	0	0	0	0	0	0	0	0	0	0
Shrewsbury Town	Total		0	0	0	0	1	0	2	0	3	0
Aberystwyth Town (loan)	2019–20	Cymru Premier	3	0	1	0	0	0	0	0	4	0
Barwell (loan)	2020–21	Southern League Premier Central	4	0	0	0	—		1 (Note: Appearance in the FA Trophy)	0	5	0
Career total			7	0	1	0	1	0	3	0	12	0
