= James Bolton (footballer) =

English footballer (born 1994)

Personal information
- Full name: James William Bolton
- Date of birth: 13 August 1994 (age 32)
- Place of birth: Stone, England
- Height: 6 ft 2 in (1.88 m)
- Position: Defender

Team information
- Current team: Kerala Blasters

Youth career
- Stoke City
- –2013: Macclesfield Town

Senior career*
| Years | Team | Apps | (Gls) |
| 2013–2014 | Macclesfield Town | 10 | (0) |
| 2012 | → Workington (loan) | 13 | (1) |
| 2012–2013 | → Stafford Rangers (loan) | ? | (1) |
| 2013 | → FC Halifax Town (loan) | 7 | (3) |
| 2014 | → FC Halifax Town (loan) | 12 | (1) |
| 2014–2016 | FC Halifax Town | 79 | (7) |
| 2016–2017 | Gateshead | 39 | (1) |
| 2017–2019 | Shrewsbury Town | 64 | (2) |
| 2019–2021 | Portsmouth | 36 | (2) |
| 2021–2023 | Plymouth Argyle | 19 | (1) |
| 2023–2024 | St Mirren | 23 | (1) |
| 2024–2026 | Fleetwood Town | 42 | (5) |
| 2026– | Kerala Blasters | 4 | (0) |

International career
| 2015–2016 | England C | 4 | (0) |
- * Club domestic league appearances and goals as of 11 October 2026

James William Bolton (born 13 August 1994) is an English professional footballer who plays as a defender for Indian Super League club Kerala Blasters.

== Career ==
=== Non-league ===
Born in Stone, Staffordshire, Bolton spent seven years as a youth player at Stoke City. He then joined Macclesfield Town at the age of sixteen.

On 23 August 2012, Bolton and teammate André da Costa were loaned to Workington of the Conference North for a month. The deal was extended until the new year, and he made 14 total appearances, scoring the equaliser in a 2–1 home win over Hinckley United on 29 September.

Bolton was sent out again in December 2012 to Stafford Rangers, signing for a month to the Northern Premier League Premier Division club. He then joined FC Halifax Town on loan on 28 March, for the rest of the season. He scored three goals in seven games for the Shaymen, all within seven days in mid-April.

In 2013–14, Bolton made ten Conference National appearances for Macclesfield before being loaned back to Halifax in the same league on 30 January, for the second half of the season. On 2 July 2014, the deal was made permanent for an undisclosed contract length. After being part of the Halifax squad which won the FA Trophy but were also relegated from the National League, he joined Gateshead on a three-year deal in May 2016.

=== Shrewsbury Town ===
After one season at Gateshead, Bolton joined League One side Shrewsbury Town in July 2017 for an undisclosed fee, signing a two-year deal. He made his English Football League debut on 5 August in a 1−0 home victory over Northampton Town.

On 29 August, Bolton was sent off for a foul on Jodi Jones as Shrewsbury won 3–2 at Coventry City in the EFL Trophy. He scored his first goal for the Shrews on 27 January 2018, the only one of a win away to Portsmouth. Bolton started in the EFL Trophy final and League One play-off final, which his team lost to Lincoln City and Rotherham United respectively at Wembley Stadium.

In the 2018–19 FA Cup third round replay away to his childhood club Stoke, Bolton scored Shrewsbury's first goal as they overturned a 0–2 deficit in the last 19 minutes to win 3–2. He was on target again in the next round's replay at Premier League club Wolverhampton Wanderers, albeit in a 3–2 loss on 5 February.

=== Portsmouth ===
On 7 June 2019, Bolton signed for fellow League One team Portsmouth on a free transfer on a three-year deal after turning down an improved contract. He made his debut on 3 August on his return to the New Meadow, as a 53rd-minute substitute for Anton Walkes in a 1–0 loss to Shrewsbury.

Bolton scored his first goal for Pompey on 4 January 2020, opening a 2–1 win at Fleetwood Town in the third round of the FA Cup. On 1 February, he recorded a first league goal in a 2–0 victory over Sunderland at Fratton Park.

=== Plymouth Argyle ===
On 24 June 2021, Bolton signed for League One side Plymouth Argyle on a two-year deal for an undisclosed fee.

He made just eight appearances in all competitions across the 2022–23 season as Argyle won promotion from League One as Champions, being released at the end of the season.

=== St Mirren ===
Bolton signed for Scottish Premiership club St Mirren in July 2023, and signed a contract extension until the summer of 2025 in February 2024.

=== Fleetwood Town ===
On 4 July 2024, Bolton signed for League Two club Fleetwood Town for an undisclosed fee. On 15 May 2026, Fleetwood announced he would be leaving in the summer when his contract expired.

=== Kerala Blasters ===
Bolton was signed by the Indian Super League club Kerala Blasters in October 2026. He made his debut for the club on 11 October 2026 against Inter Kashi FC in a 2–0 victory.

== Personal life ==
On 21 March 2020, it was reported that Bolton and three Portsmouth teammates had tested positive for COVID-19 during the 2020 pandemic. None were reported to be seriously ill.

== Career statistics ==
As of match played 16 December 2024

Appearances and goals by club, season and competition
| Club | Season | League | | | FA Cup | | League Cup | | Other | | Total | |
| Club | Season | Division | Apps | Goals | Apps | Goals | Apps | Goals | Apps | Goals | Apps | Goals |
|---|---|---|---|---|---|---|---|---|---|---|---|---|
| Macclesfield Town | 2013–14 | Conference National | 10 | 0 | 0 | 0 | – | | 1 (Note: Appearance(s) in FA Trophy) | 0 | 11 | 0 |
| Workington (loan) | 2012–13 | Conference North | 13 | 1 | 1 | 0 | – | | 0 | 0 | 14 | 1 |
| FC Halifax Town (loan) | 2012–13 | Conference North | 7 | 3 | 0 | 0 | – | | 0 | 0 | 7 | 3 |
| FC Halifax Town (loan) | 2013–14 | Conference National | 12 | 1 | 0 | 0 | – | | 2 (Note: Appearances in Conference play-offs) | 0 | 14 | 1 |
| FC Halifax Town | 2014–15 | Conference National | 34 | 4 | 0 | 0 | – | | 2 | 0 | 36 | 4 |
| FC Halifax Town | 2015–16 | Conference National | 45 | 3 | 3 | 1 | – | | 7 | 0 | 55 | 4 |
| FC Halifax Town | Total | | 79 | 7 | 3 | 1 | 0 | 0 | 9 | 0 | 91 | 8 |
| Gateshead | 2016–17 | National League | 39 | 1 | 0 | 0 | – | | 2 | 0 | 41 | 1 |
| Shrewsbury Town | 2017–18 | League One | 33 | 1 | 3 | 0 | 1 | 0 | 7 (Note: Four appearances in EFL Trophy, three appearances in EFL League One play-offs) | 0 | 44 | 1 |
| Shrewsbury Town | 2018–19 | League One | 28 | 1 | 6 | 2 | 1 | 0 | 3 (Note: Appearances in EFL Trophy) | 0 | 38 | 3 |
| Shrewsbury Town | Total | | 61 | 2 | 9 | 2 | 2 | 0 | 10 | 0 | 82 | 4 |
| Portsmouth | 2019–20 | League One | 23 | 1 | 3 | 1 | 1 | 0 | 6 (Note: Four appearances in EFL Trophy, two appearances in EFL League One play-offs) | 0 | 33 | 2 |
| Portsmouth | 2020–21 | League One | 13 | 1 | 0 | 0 | 2 | 0 | 5 | 0 | 20 | 1 |
| Portsmouth | Total | | 36 | 2 | 3 | 1 | 3 | 1 | 11 | 0 | 53 | 3 |
| Plymouth Argyle | 2021–22 | League One | 13 | 0 | 1 | 0 | 0 | 0 | 0 | 0 | 14 | 0 |
| Plymouth Argyle | 2022–23 | League One | 6 | 1 | 0 | 0 | 0 | 0 | 2 | 0 | 8 | 1 |
| Plymouth Argyle | Total | | 19 | 1 | 1 | 0 | 0 | 0 | 2 | 0 | 22 | 1 |
| St Mirren | 2023–24 | Scottish Premiership | 21 | 0 | 1 | 0 | 2 | 0 | 0 | 0 | 24 | 0 |
| St Mirren | Total | | 21 | 0 | 1 | 0 | 2 | 0 | 0 | 0 | 24 | 0 |
| Fleetwood Town | 2024–25 | League Two | 12 | 0 | 0 | 0 | 1 | 0 | 2 | 0 | 15 | 0 |
| Career total | | | 309 | 18 | 18 | 4 | 8 | 0 | 39 | 0 | 374 | 22 |

== Honours ==
Shrewsbury Town

- EFL Trophy runner-up: 2017–18

Portsmouth

- EFL Trophy runner-up: 2019–20

Plymouth Argyle

- EFL League One: 2022–23
- EFL Trophy runner-up: 2022–23
