= Rekeil Pyke =

English footballer

Personal information
- Full name: Rekeil Leshaun Pyke
- Date of birth: 1 September 1997 (age 29)
- Place of birth: Leeds, England
- Height: 5 ft 10 in (1.78 m)
- Positions: Forward; winger; wing back

Youth career
- –2009: Rothwell Juniors
- 2009–2016: Huddersfield Town

Senior career*
| Years | Team | Apps | (Gls) |
| 2016–2020 | Huddersfield Town | 1 | (0) |
| 2016 | → Wrexham (loan) | 3 | (0) |
| 2017 | → Colchester United (loan) | 12 | (0) |
| 2017–2018 | → Port Vale (loan) | 7 | (0) |
| 2018–2019 | → Wrexham (loan) | 23 | (5) |
| 2019 | → Rochdale (loan) | 6 | (0) |
| 2019–2020 | → Rochdale (loan) | 13 | (1) |
| 2020–2023 | Shrewsbury Town | 65 | (3) |
| 2022 | → Scunthorpe United (loan) | 10 | (0) |
| 2023–2025 | Grimsby Town | 34 | (4) |
| 2025 | → Eastleigh (loan) | 2 | (0) |
| 2025–2026 | Truro City | 20 | (2) |
- * Club domestic league appearances and goals as of 20:46, 30 April 2026 (UTC)

Rekeil Leshaun Pyke (born 1 September 1997) is an English professional footballer who plays as a forward, winger and wing back.

A product of the Academy at Huddersfield Town, he was loaned out to Wrexham in November 2016, Colchester United in January 2017, and Port Vale in July 2017. He returned to Wrexham on loan for the first half of the 2018–19 season before moving on loan to Rochdale for the campaign's second half. He returned on loan to Rochdale for the first half of the 2019–20 season before Huddersfield released him in July 2020. He signed with Shrewsbury Town the following month and was loaned to Scunthorpe United in January 2022. He signed with Grimsby Town in June 2023 and was loaned out to Eastleigh in the second half of the 2024–25 season. He joined Truro City in July 2025.

== Career ==
=== Huddersfield Town ===
Born in Leeds, Pyke is a product of the Huddersfield Town Academy. He first joined the club at under-12 level from local junior side Rothwell Juniors. He signed his first professional contract in February 2015, having already represented the under-21 team at the age of 17. He joined National League side Wrexham on a month long loan in November 2016. He made his debut on 29 November in Wrexham's 1–0 defeat at Lincoln City. "Dragons" manager Dean Keates said Pyke "did okay... the physicality was all new to him, a new environment, but there is still a lot more to come from him". After three appearances at the Racecourse Ground, Pyke returned to Huddersfield at the end of his loan spell on 28 December. On 30 January 2017, Pyke joined League Two club Colchester United on loan until the end of the 2016–17 season. He came on as a second-half substitute for Owen Garvan to make his professional debut on 15 February during Colchester's 3–2 defeat to Crawley Town at the Colchester Community Stadium. He made his first start in a 2–0 home victory over Mansfield Town on 14 March, after which "U's" manager John McGreal said he was "delighted" with Pyke, describing him as a "beast of a kid". He failed to score in four league starts and eight substitute appearances for Colchester.

On 11 July 2017, Pyke joined League Two side Port Vale on loan for the entire 2017–18 season. Manager Michael Brown warned fans not to burden the teenager with too much expectation after Pyke scored four goals in his first two pre-season friendly matches. However, he struggled to even appear on the first-team bench, and speaking in October, new manager Neil Aspin blamed league rules that prevented him from naming more than five loanees in a matchday squad. He then picked up a hamstring injury in a reserve team game and returned to the Kirklees Stadium for treatment. He was recalled to Huddersfield permanently on 2 January 2018.

On 10 July 2018, he returned to Wrexham on a season-long loan for the 2018–19 season. He signed a new contract at Huddersfield to keep tied to the club until summer 2020. He scored five goals in 27 appearances during his loan spell at Wrexham, being absent from Graham Barrow's first-team only during six weeks at Christmas when he was in recovery from a hamstring injury. On 26 January, he was named in the National League team of the day for his man of the match performance in a 1–0 win over Maidenhead United. However, he was recalled to Huddersfield four days later; Welsh newspaper The Leader reported that "Pyke's departure is a big blow in Wrexham's push for a top-seven finish".

On 30 January 2019, he moved up two divisions from Wrexham to join struggling League One side Rochdale on loan until the end of the 2018–19 season. He made three starts and three substitute appearances for the "Dale" by the end of the 2018–19 campaign. On 3 July, he rejoined Rochdale on loan for the whole of the 2019–20 season, with manager Brian Barry-Murphy feeling that his "unique... skills and qualities... [added] a different dimension to our attacking play". Having scored three goals in 20 appearances at Spotland, he was recalled by new Huddersfield manager Danny Cowley on 5 January. Cowley said that with Pyke's contract due to expire in the summer he wanted to assess the player at Huddersfield. He made his Huddersfield debut as a late substitute in a 3–2 defeat at Fulham on 1 February. However, this was to prove his only appearance for the "Terriers" before he was released on 24 July 2020.

=== Shrewsbury Town ===
On 3 August 2020, Pyke joined League One side Shrewsbury Town, signing a three-year deal and reuniting with boss Sam Ricketts who Pyke had played under at Wrexham. He scored on his "Shrews" debut, a 4–3 defeat at Middlesbrough in the EFL Cup. However, later in September Pyke was ruled out for four months due to a thigh injury after being forced off in a 2–1 defeat to Northampton Town at the New Meadow. Ricketts commented that Pyke and injured strike partner Leon Clarke were both a big miss for the team. By the time he returned to fitness Steve Cotterill had replaced Ricketts as manager, and assistant boss Aaron Wilbraham said that Pyke would have to work hard to win back his place in the starting eleven. He ended the 2020–21 campaign with 14 appearances to his name, without scoring any further goals.

On 31 January 2022, Pyke joined League Two bottom side Scunthorpe United on loan until the end of the 2021–22 season. He had previously worked with manager Keith Hill at Rochdale. He started six games and made four substitute appearances as the "Iron" were relegated out of the English Football League.

Speaking in August 2022, Shrewsbury manager Steve Cotterill said that the Scunthorpe loan was "a waste of time" and was the player's choice rather than Cotterill's decision. Three months later, Cotterill praised Pyke for adapting to the wing-back role as Julien Dacosta and Elliott Bennett were sidelined with injury. Pyke ended the 2022–23 season with three goals in 19 starts and 23 substitute appearances, departing the club upon the expiration of his contract.

=== Grimsby Town ===
On 26 June 2023, Pyke signed a two-year deal with Grimsby Town, with manager Paul Hurst confirming that he was signed to play at centre-forward. The Grimsby Telegraph reported in September that "he has struggled to get up to speed both with his match fitness and fitting into Paul Hurst's system". He scored eight goals in 34 games in the 2023–24 season. He missed much of the summer of 2024 due to injury. He struggled for game time under both Paul Hurst and his successor, David Artell, playing eight games in the first half of the 2024–25 campaign.

On 23 January 2025, Pyke joined National League side Eastleigh on loan for the remainder of the season. He played three games for the club. He was released by Grimsby upon his return to Blundell Park.

=== Truro City ===
On 31 July 2025, Pyke joined newly promoted National League side Truro City on an initial one-year deal with an option to extend. He played 22 games of the 2025–26 relegation campaign, being sent off in the National League Cup semi-final defeat to Boreham Wood. He was released upon the expiry of his contract.

== Style of play ==
Pyke is primarily a striker but during his three years at Shrewsbury Town he was predominantly converted to play as a winger and a wing back.

== Career statistics ==
As of match played 25 April 2026

Appearances and goals by club, season and competition
| Club | Season | League | | | FA Cup | | League Cup | | Other | | Total | |
| Club | Season | Division | Apps | Goals | Apps | Goals | Apps | Goals | Apps | Goals | Apps | Goals |
|---|---|---|---|---|---|---|---|---|---|---|---|---|
| Huddersfield Town | 2016–17 | Championship | 0 | 0 | 0 | 0 | 0 | 0 | 0 | 0 | 0 | 0 |
| Huddersfield Town | 2017–18 | Premier League | 0 | 0 | 0 | 0 | 0 | 0 | — | | 0 | 0 |
| Huddersfield Town | 2018–19 | Premier League | 0 | 0 | 0 | 0 | 0 | 0 | — | | 0 | 0 |
| Huddersfield Town | 2019–20 | Championship | 1 | 0 | 0 | 0 | 0 | 0 | — | | 1 | 0 |
| Huddersfield Town | Total | | 1 | 0 | 0 | 0 | 0 | 0 | 0 | 0 | 1 | 0 |
| Wrexham (loan) | 2016–17 | National League | 3 | 0 | 0 | 0 | — | | 0 | 0 | 3 | 0 |
| Colchester United (loan) | 2016–17 | League Two | 12 | 0 | 0 | 0 | 0 | 0 | 0 | 0 | 12 | 0 |
| Port Vale (loan) | 2017–18 | League Two | 7 | 0 | 0 | 0 | 1 | 0 | 1 (Note: Appearance in the EFL Trophy) | 0 | 9 | 0 |
| Wrexham (loan) | 2018–19 | National League | 23 | 5 | 3 | 0 | — | | 1 (Note: Appearance in the FA Trophy) | 0 | 27 | 5 |
| Rochdale (loan) | 2018–19 | League One | 6 | 0 | 0 | 0 | 0 | 0 | 0 | 0 | 6 | 0 |
| Rochdale (loan) | 2019–20 | League One | 13 | 1 | 4 | 0 | 2 | 1 | 1 | 1 | 20 | 3 |
| Rochdale (loan) | Total | | 19 | 1 | 4 | 0 | 2 | 1 | 1 | 1 | 26 | 3 |
| Shrewsbury Town | 2020–21 | League One | 12 | 0 | 1 | 0 | 1 | 1 | 0 | 0 | 14 | 1 |
| Shrewsbury Town | 2021–22 | League One | 16 | 0 | 1 | 0 | 2 | 0 | 2 | 1 | 21 | 1 |
| Shrewsbury Town | 2022–23 | League One | 37 | 3 | 3 | 0 | 2 | 0 | 0 | 0 | 42 | 3 |
| Shrewsbury Town | Total | | 65 | 3 | 5 | 0 | 5 | 1 | 2 | 1 | 77 | 5 |
| Scunthorpe United (loan) | 2021–22 | League Two | 10 | 0 | 0 | 0 | 0 | 0 | 0 | 0 | 10 | 0 |
| Grimsby Town | 2023–24 | League Two | 27 | 4 | 3 | 2 | 1 | 0 | 3 | 2 | 34 | 8 |
| Grimsby Town | 2024–25 | League Two | 7 | 0 | 0 | 0 | 0 | 0 | 1 | 0 | 8 | 0 |
| Grimsby Town | Total | | 34 | 4 | 3 | 2 | 1 | 0 | 4 | 2 | 42 | 8 |
| Eastleigh (loan) | 2024–25 | National League | 2 | 0 | 0 | 0 | — | | 1 | 0 | 3 | 0 |
| Truro City | 2025–26 | National League | 20 | 2 | 0 | 0 | — | | 2 (Note: Appearance in the National League Cup) | 0 | 22 | 2 |
| Career total | | | 196 | 15 | 15 | 2 | 9 | 2 | 12 | 4 | 232 | 23 |
