= 2021–22 Shrewsbury Town F.C. season =

Shrewsbury Town
2021–22 season
- Chairman: Roland Wycherley
- Manager: Steve Cotterill
- Stadium: Montgomery Waters Meadow
- League One: 18th
- FA Cup: Third Round
- EFL Cup: Second Round
- EFL Trophy: Group Stage
- Top goalscorer: League: Daniel Udoh (13); All: Daniel Udoh (16)
- Highest home attendance: 8,369 v Wigan Athletic
- Lowest home attendance: 4,510 v Wycombe Wanderers
- Average home league attendance: 6,216
Home colours

The 2021–22 season is Shrewsbury Town's 136th year in their history and seventh consecutive season in League One. Along with the league, the club will also compete in the FA Cup, the EFL Cup and the EFL Trophy. The season covers the period from 1 July 2021 to 30 June 2022.

== Pre-season friendlies ==
Shrewsbury Town confirmed as part of their pre-season preparations they would have friendlies against AFC Telford United, Tamworth, Hereford and Exeter City.

However, the planned friendly against Tamworth was cancelled due to unforeseen circumstances.

13 July 2021 Friendly	AFC Telford United	2–3	Shrewsbury Town	Wellington
19:45 BST	Streete 16'; Oswell 74'	Report	Bowman 30' (pen.), 49'; Udoh 54'	Stadium: New Bucks Head; Attendance: 1,205

17 July 2021 Friendly	Tamworth	P–P	Shrewsbury Town	Tamworth
TBC BST				Stadium: The Lamb Ground
Note: Match cancelled due to unforeseen circumstances.

20 July 2021 Friendly	Hereford	1–2	Shrewsbury Town	Hereford
19:00 BST	Storey 57'	Report	Whalley 81' (?)	Stadium: Edgar Street

31 July 2021 Friendly	Exeter City	0–2	Shrewsbury Town	Exeter
15:00 BST		Report	Udoh 4', 9'	Stadium: St James Park; Attendance: 0 (Behind-closed-doors)

== Competitions ==
=== League One ===
==== League table ====
Pos	Team	Pld	W	D	L	GF	GA	GD	Pts	Promotion, qualification or relegation
14	Cambridge United	46	15	13	18	56	74	−18	58	
15	Cheltenham Town	46	13	17	16	66	80	−14	56	
16	Burton Albion	46	14	11	21	51	67	−16	53	
17	Lincoln City	46	14	10	22	55	63	−8	52	
18	Shrewsbury Town	46	12	14	20	47	51	−4	50	
19	Morecambe	46	10	12	24	57	88	−31	42	
20	Fleetwood Town	46	8	16	22	62	82	−20	40	
21	Gillingham (R)	46	8	16	22	35	69	−34	40	Relegation to EFL League Two
22	Doncaster Rovers (R)	46	10	8	28	37	82	−45	38	Relegation to EFL League Two

Source: EFL Official Website
Rules for classification: 1) Points; 2) Goal difference; 3) Number of goals scored; 4) Head-to-head results; 5) Wins; 6) Away goals; 7) Penalty points based on yellow and red cards received excluding the last four games of the season (sec 9.5); 8) 12-point sending off offences; 9) If the tie affects the automatic promotion or relegation places, a play-off game or games would be held between the two tied teams
(R) Relegated

==== Results summary ====
Overall								Home						Away					
Pld	W	D	L	GF	GA	GD	Pts	W	D	L	GF	GA	GD	W	D	L	GF	GA	GD
46	12	14	20	47	51	−4	50	9	7	7	30	25	+5	3	7	13	17	26	−9

Last updated: 30 April 2022.

==== Results by matchday ====
Matchday	1	2	3	4	5	6	7	8	9	10	11	12	13	14	15	16	17	18	19	20	21	22	23	24	25	26	27	28	29	30	31	32	33	34	35	36	37	38	39	40	41	42	43	44	45	46
Ground	H	A	A	H	H	A	H	A	H	H	A	A	H	A	H	A	A	H	H	A	A	H	A	H	H	A	H	A	A	H	A	A	H	A	H	A	H	H	A	H	A	H	A	H	A	H
Result	L	L	L	L	W	L	D	D	W	L	L	L	W	L	W	D	L	D	W	L	L	W	W	D	W	D	L	D	D	D	D	L	L	W	D	D	L	W	W	W	L	D	L	D	L	L
Position	23	24	24	24	22	22	21	22	20	21	23	23	21	21	20	21	21	21	19	19	20	20	18	16	14	15	18	17	16	16	18	18	18	17	17	17	18	17	16	15	16	16	17	17	17	18

Updated to match(es) played on 30 April 2022. Source: Statto.com
A = Away; H = Home; W = Win; D = Draw; L = Loss

==== Matches ====
Salop's fixtures were released on 24 June 2021.

7 August 2021 1	Shrewsbury Town	0–1	Burton Albion	Shrewsbury
15:00 BST	Leahy (yellow card) 76'	Report	Brayford 31'; Leak (yellow card) 61'; Powell (yellow card) 87'	Stadium: Montgomery Waters Meadow; Attendance: 5,903; Referee: Anthony Backhouse

14 August 2021 2	Morecambe	2–0	Shrewsbury Town	Morecambe
15:00 BST	Phillips 34' (pen.); Stockton 44'; McLoughlin (yellow card) 54'; Cooney (yellow card) 61'	Report	Davis (yellow card) 25'; Pierre (yellow card) 66'; Daniels (yellow card) 90+4'	Stadium: Mazuma Stadium; Attendance: 3,772; Referee: Declan Bourne

17 August 2021 3	Portsmouth	1–0	Shrewsbury Town	Milton
19:45 BST	Tunnicliffe 3'; Curtis (yellow card) 20'	Report	Vela (yellow card) 54'	Stadium: Fratton Park; Attendance: 14,471; Referee: Trevor Kettle

21 August 2021 4	Shrewsbury Town	0–3	Plymouth Argyle	Shrewsbury
15:00 BST	Leahy (yellow card) 39'; Vela (yellow card) 77'	Report	Hardie 24', 65'; Broom (yellow card) 40'; Jephcott 50'	Stadium: Montgomery Waters Meadow; Attendance: 5,737; Referee: Paul Howard

28 August 2021 5	Shrewsbury Town	2–1	Gillingham	Shrewsbury
15:00 BST	Bloxham 59'; Cosgrove 68'; Davis (yellow card) 90+3' (yellow-red card) 90+8'	Report	Tucker 12'; Adshead (yellow card) 43'; Phillips (yellow card) 90+2' (yellow-red card) 90+8'	Stadium: Montgomery Waters Meadow; Attendance: 4,625; Referee: Sam Allison

4 September 2021 6	Accrington Stanley	1–0	Shrewsbury Town	Accrington
15:00 BST	Mumbongo 15'; Morgan (yellow card) 65'	Report	Vela (yellow card) 25'; Pennington (yellow card) 44'; Cosgrove (yellow card) 45+2'; Nurse (yellow card) 62'	Stadium: Wham Stadium; Attendance: 2,465; Referee: Antony Coggins

11 September 2021 7	Shrewsbury Town	1–1	Crewe Alexandra	Shrewsbury
15:00 BST	Cosgrove 19'; Pennington (yellow card) 35'; Ebanks-Landell (yellow card) 57'; Pierre (yellow card) 67'; Udoh (yellow card) 90+7'	Report	Adebisi (yellow card) 3'; Murphy (yellow card) 36'; Mandron 44'; Robertson (yellow card) 71'; Ramsay (yellow card) 87'; Daniels (yellow card) 90+9'	Stadium: Montgomery Waters Meadow; Attendance: 5,867; Referee: Sam Barrott

18 September 2021 8	Sheffield Wednesday	1–1	Shrewsbury Town	Sheffield
15:00 BST	Berahino 7'; Dunkley (yellow card) 55'	Report	Bowman 37'; Vela (yellow card) 53'; Leahy (yellow card) 54'	Stadium: Hillsborough Stadium; Referee: Ben Toner

25 September 2021 9	Shrewsbury Town	2–1	AFC Wimbledon	Shrewsbury
15:00 BST	Leahy 41'; Bennett (yellow card) 45+1'; Udoh 67'	Report	Mebude 32'; Assal (yellow card) 52'	Stadium: Montgomery Waters Meadow; Attendance: 5,346; Referee: James Bell

28 September 2021 10	Shrewsbury Town	1–2	Wycombe Wanderers	Shrewsbury
19:45 BST	Whalley (yellow card) 36'; Ebanks-Landell (yellow card) 60'; Leahy (yellow card) 64'; Pennington 78'	Report	Kaikai (yellow card) 15'; Jacobson 52'; Tafazolli 66'; Grimmer (yellow card) 69'; Stewart (yellow card) 85'; Stockdale (yellow card) 90'	Stadium: Montgomery Waters Meadow; Attendance: 4,510; Referee: Ross Joyce

2 October 2021 11	Bolton Wanderers	2–1	Shrewsbury Town	Horwich
15:00 BST	Sarcevic 18'; Afolayan 23'; Santos (yellow card) 88'	Report	Bowman (penalty missed) 57'; Leahy 89'; Bennett (yellow card) 90+6'	Stadium: University of Bolton Stadium; Attendance: 14,124; Referee: Marc Edwards

9 October 2021 12	Ipswich Town	2–1	Shrewsbury Town	Ipswich
BST	Chaplin 23'; Burgess (yellow card) 39'; Bonne 54'; Fraser (yellow card) 90+2'; Edmundson (yellow card) 90+3'	Report	Whalley 28'; Pierre (yellow card) 68'	Stadium: Portman Road; Attendance: 19,256; Referee: Will Finnie

16 October 2021 13	Shrewsbury Town	1–0	Milton Keynes Dons	Shrewsbury
15:00 BST	Whalley (yellow card) 30', (goal) 56'; Leahy (yellow card) 36'	Report	Darling (yellow card) 45+1'	Stadium: Montgomery Waters Meadow; Attendance: 5,711; Referee: Carl Brook

19 October 2021 14	Oxford United	2–0	Shrewsbury Town	Oxford
19:45 GMT	Sykes 46'; Brannagan 87'	Report		Stadium: The Kassam Stadium; Attendance: 5,763; Referee: Craig Hicks

23 October 2021 15	Shrewsbury Town	4–1	Cambridge United	Shrewsbury
15:00 BST	Bowman 6', 73', 83'; Ebanks-Landell (yellow card) 45+8'; Leahy 90'	Report	Digby (yellow card) 57'; Iredale 58'; Jones (yellow card) 60'; May (red card) 68'; Brophy (yellow card) 70'; Hoolahan (yellow card) 84'; Smith (yellow card) 85'	Stadium: Montgomery Waters Meadow; Attendance: 5,387; Referee: Simon Mather

30 October 2021 16	Lincoln City	1–1	Shrewsbury Town	Lincoln
15:00 BST	Fiorini (yellow card) 13'; McGrandles 43'; Poole (yellow card) 89'	Report	Udoh (yellow card) 30'; Leahy 50'; Whalley (yellow card) 80'	Stadium: LNER Stadium; Attendance: 8,047; Referee: Bobby Madley

20 November 2021 17	Cheltenham Town	2–1	Shrewsbury Town	Cheltenham
15:00 GMT	Thomas 24' (pen.); Joseph 66'	Report	Pennington (yellow card) 1'; Udoh 4'; Bennett (red card) 23'; Bowman (yellow card) 54'; Leahy (yellow card) 78'	Stadium: Jonny-Rocks Stadium; Attendance: 3,914; Referee: Ollie Yates

23 November 2021 18	Shrewsbury Town	1–1	Sunderland	Shrewsbury
19:45 GMT	Davis (red card) 45+2'; Udoh 64'	Report	Pritchard 16'; Broadhead (yellow card) 44'	Stadium: Montgomery Waters Meadow; Attendance: 6,253; Referee: Peter Wright

27 November 2021 19	Shrewsbury Town	1–0	Charlton Athletic	Shrewsbury
15:00 GMT	Udoh 90+3'	Report		Stadium: Montgomery Waters Meadow; Attendance: 6,158; Referee: Tom Neild

7 December 2021 20	Wigan Athletic	2–1	Shrewsbury Town	Wigan
19:45 GMT	Darikwa 2'; Aasgaard 90+2'; Humphrys (yellow card) 90+6'	Report	Bowman 39'; Daniels (yellow card) 89'; Cosgrove (yellow card) 90+1'	Stadium: DW Stadium; Attendance: 8,098; Referee: David Rock

11 December 2021 21	Doncaster Rovers	1–0	Shrewsbury Town	Doncaster
15:00 GMT	Horton (yellow card) 38'; Galbraith (yellow card) 75'; Olowu 79'	Report	Vela (yellow card) 75'	Stadium: Keepmoat Stadium; Attendance: 5,697; Referee: Christopher Pollard

18 December 2021 22	Shrewsbury Town	3–1	Cheltenham Town	Shrewsbury
15:00 GMT	Udoh 10', 48'; Bloxham (red card) 40'; Davis 78'	Report	Williams 16'; May (yellow card) 25'; Hussey (yellow card) 40'; Chapman (yellow card) 45'	Stadium: Montgomery Waters Meadow; Attendance: 5,741; Referee: Andrew Kitchen

26 December 2021 23	Fleetwood Town	0–3	Shrewsbury Town	Fleetwood
15:00 GMT		Report	Leahy (yellow card) 40'; Bowman 49'; Udoh (yellow card) 63', (goal) 80'; Vela 73'	Stadium: Highbury Stadium; Attendance: 2,878; Referee: Anthony Backhouse

29 December 2021 24	Shrewsbury Town	0–0	Accrington Stanley	Shrewsbury
19:45 GMT				Stadium: Montgomery Waters Meadow; Attendance: 5,817; Referee: Neil Hair

2 January 2022 25	Shrewsbury Town	1–0	Sheffield Wednesday	Shrewsbury
15:00 GMT	Pennington 45+1'; Vela (yellow card) 84'; Daniels (yellow card) 90+2'	Report	Adeniran (yellow card) 37'; Hutchinson (yellow card) 90+3'	Stadium: Montgomery Waters Meadow; Attendance: 8,270; Referee: Marc Edwards

15 January 2022 26	Crewe Alexandra	0–0	Shrewsbury Town	Crewe
15:00 GMT	Griffiths (yellow card) 23'; Sass-Davies (yellow card) 63'	Report		Stadium: Mornflake Stadium; Attendance: 5,587; Referee: Gavin Ward

22 January 2022 27	Shrewsbury Town	0–1	Bolton Wanderers	Shrewsbury
15:00 GMT	Pennington (yellow card) 32'; Ogbeta (yellow card) 67'	Report	Charles 89', (yellow card) 90'	Stadium: Montgomery Waters Meadow; Attendance: 8,027; Referee: Charles Breakspear

25 January 2022 28	Gillingham	0–0	Shrewsbury Town	Gillingham
19:45 GMT	Lee (yellow card) 27'; Ehmer (yellow card) 29'; Phillips (yellow card) 78'	Report	Leahy (yellow card) 90+1'	Stadium: Priestfield; Attendance: 3,213; Referee: Brett Huxtable

29 January 2022 29	AFC Wimbledon	1–1	Shrewsbury Town	Wimbledon
15:00 GMT	Assal 13', (yellow card) 45+3'; Rudoni (yellow card) 30'; Heneghan (yellow card) 77'	Report	Vela (yellow card) 47'; Udoh 58'; Bennett (yellow card) 87'	Stadium: Plough Lane; Attendance: 7,824; Referee: Carl Boyeson

5 February 2022 30	Shrewsbury Town	1–1	Fleetwood Town	Shrewsbury
15:00 GMT	Leahy 48' (pen.), (yellow card) 69'	Report	Pilkington 21'; Lane (yellow card) 79'; Johnson (yellow card) 90+2'; Camps (red card) 90+3'	Stadium: Montgomery Waters Meadow; Attendance: 5,808; Referee: James Bell

8 February 2022 31	Wycombe Wanderers	0–0	Shrewsbury Town	High Wycombe
19:45 GMT	Jacobson (yellow card) 87'	Report	Bennett (yellow card) 34'; Maroši (yellow card) 53'; Pennington (yellow card) 69'	Stadium: Adams Park; Attendance: 3,871; Referee: Sam Purkiss

12 February 2022 32	Plymouth Argyle	1–0	Shrewsbury Town	Plymouth
15:00 GMT	Houghton (yellow card) 32'; Camará (yellow card) 54'; Grant 62'; Bolton (yellow card) 80'	Report	Vela (yellow card) 34'	Stadium: Home Park; Attendance: 14,714; Referee: James Oldham

22 February 2022 33	Shrewsbury Town	1–2	Portsmouth	Shrewsbury
19:45 GMT	Leahy 14'; Vela (red card) 31'	Report	Hume 29'; Thompson (yellow card) 69', (goal) 84'	Stadium: Montgomery Waters Meadow; Attendance: 5,862; Referee: Seb Stockbridge

26 February 2022 34	Burton Albion	0–2	Shrewsbury Town	Burton upon Trent
15:00 GMT		Report	Bloxham 35'; Pennington 59'	Stadium: Pirelli Stadium; Attendance: 3,258; Referee: Ben Speedie

1 March 2022 35	Shrewsbury Town	0–0	Rotherham United	Shrewsbury
19:45 GMT	Pennington (yellow card) 41'	Report		Stadium: Montgomery Waters Meadow; Attendance: 5,111; Referee: Carl Brook

5 March 2022 36	Cambridge United	0–0	Shrewsbury Town	Cambridge
15:00 GMT	Okedina (yellow card) 90'	Report	Nurse (yellow card) 56'; Bowman (yellow card) 90'	Stadium: The Abbey Stadium; Attendance: 5,651; Referee: Neil Hair

12 March 2022 37	Shrewsbury Town	1–2	Oxford United	Shrewsbury
15:00 GMT	Bowman 60'; Pennington (yellow card) 82'	Report	Taylor 11'; Brannagan 82' (pen.)	Stadium: Montgomery Waters Meadow; Attendance: 7,302; Referee: Andy Davies

15 March 2022 38	Shrewsbury Town	5–0	Morecambe	Shrewsbury
19:45 GMT	Udoh 44', 65'; Leahy 47' (pen.), 51'; Bowman 70'	Report	Wildig (yellow card) 50'; McLoughlin (yellow card) 89'	Stadium: Montgomery Waters Meadow; Attendance: 5,804; Referee: Darren Drysdale

19 March 2022 39	Rotherham United	0–3	Shrewsbury Town	Rotherham
15:00 GMT	Kayode (yellow card) 32'; MacDonald (red card) 38'	Report	Udoh (yellow card) 29', (goal) 36'; Bennett (yellow card) 76', (goal) 78'; Pennington (yellow card) 84'; Bowman 90+2'	Stadium: AESSEAL New York Stadium; Attendance: 9,253; Referee: Anthony Backhouse

26 March 2022 40	Shrewsbury Town	1–0	Lincoln City	Shrewsbury
15:00 GMT	Leahy (yellow card) 22'; Bennett (yellow card) 51'; Vela (yellow card) 62'; Udoh 84'	Report		Stadium: Montgomery Waters Meadow; Attendance: 6,791; Referee: Christopher Pollard

2 April 2022 41	Milton Keynes Dons	2–0	Shrewsbury Town	Denbigh
15:00 BST	Eisa 17'; Twine 54'	Report	Bowman (yellow card) 10'; Flanagan (yellow card) 54'; Bennett (yellow card) 71'; Vela (yellow card) 68'; Leahy (yellow card) 90+2'	Stadium: Stadium MK; Attendance: 8,984; Referee: Martin Coy

9 April 2022 42	Shrewsbury Town	1–1	Ipswich Town	Shrewsbury
15:00 BST	Leahy (yellow card) 29'; Pennington (yellow card) 43'; Vela (yellow card) 66'; Whalley 84'; Nurse (yellow card) 87'	Report	Norwood 6'; Morsy (yellow card) 25'; Burgess (yellow card) 45+11' (yellow-red card) 75'; Burns (yellow card) 86'; Donacien (yellow card) 87'	Stadium: Montgomery Waters Meadow; Attendance: 7,682; Referee: Darren Handley

15 April 2022 43	Sunderland	3–2	Shrewsbury Town	Sunderland
15:00 BST	Embleton 4'; Broadhead 13', 90+2'; Clarke (yellow card) 22'; O'Nien (yellow card) 88'	Report	Bennett (yellow card) 28'; Vela 50', (yellow card) 90+6'; Flanagan 58'; Bowman (yellow card) 90+1'	Stadium: Stadium of Light; Attendance: 33,896; Referee: Darren Bond

18 April 2022 44	Shrewsbury Town	3–3	Doncaster Rovers	Shrewsbury
15:00 BST	Udoh 19'; Bowman 34'; Whalley 42', (yellow card) 90+3'	Report	Odubeko 54'; Griffiths 77'; Knoyle 90+4'	Stadium: Montgomery Waters Meadow; Attendance: 6,556; Referee: Andrew Kitchen

23 April 2022 45	Charlton Athletic	2–0	Shrewsbury Town	Charlton
15:00 BST	Stockley 64'; Aneke 86'	Report		Stadium: The Valley; Attendance: 11,287; Referee: Sam Purkiss

30 April 2022 46	Shrewsbury Town	0–3	Wigan Athletic	Shrewsbury
12:30 BST	Vela (yellow card) 61'; Leahy (yellow card) 90+3'	Report	Vela 43' (o.g.); Keane 50' (pen.), 65'	Stadium: Montgomery Waters Meadow; Attendance: 8,369; Referee: Steve Martin

=== FA Cup ===
Shrewsbury were drawn away to Stratford Town in the first round, Carlisle United in the second round and Liverpool in the third round.

7 November 2021 First round	Stratford Town	1–5	Shrewsbury Town	Tiddington
15:00 GMT	Grocott 11'; Fry (yellow card) 45'; Issac (yellow card) 84'	Report	Bowman 25', 54'; Leahy 57'; Bennett 62'; Ebanks-Landell (yellow card) 82'; Bloxham 90+2'	Stadium: The Arden Garages Stadium; Attendance: 2,800; Referee: Ben Toner

4 December 2021 Second round	Carlisle United	1–2	Shrewsbury Town	Carlisle
15:00 GMT	Whelan (yellow card) 8'; Clough (yellow card) 30'; Feeney (yellow card) 60'; Gibson 90+1'	Report	Bloxham 10'; Pennington (yellow card) 25'; Vela (yellow card) 49'; Udoh (yellow card) 54'; Bowman 78'	Stadium: Brunton Park; Attendance: 2,794; Referee: Sam Barrott

9 January 2022 Third round	Liverpool	4–1	Shrewsbury Town	Liverpool
14:00 GMT	Gordon 34'; Fabinho 44' (pen.), 90+3'; Firmino 79'	Report	Pennington (yellow card) 13'; Udoh 27'; Ebanks-Landell (yellow card) 79'; Daniels (yellow card) 89'	Stadium: Anfield; Attendance: 52,226; Referee: David Coote

=== EFL Cup ===
Shrewsbury Town were drawn at home to Lincoln City in the first round and Rochdale in the second round.

10 August 2021 First round	Shrewsbury Town	2–2 (4–2 p)	Lincoln City	Shrewsbury
19:45 BST	Udoh 69', 79'	Report	Hopper 49'; Bishop 52'	Stadium: Montgomery Waters Meadow; Attendance: 2,069; Referee: Andy Haines
	Penalties
	Bennett (penalty scored); Nurse (penalty scored); Davis (penalty scored); Vela (penalty missed); Bloxham (penalty scored)		Scully (penalty scored); Hopper (penalty missed); Sanders (penalty scored); Fiorini (penalty missed)

24 August 2021 Second round	Shrewsbury Town	0–2	Rochdale	Shrewsbury
19:45 BST	Bennett (yellow card) 53'; Ebanks-Landell (yellow card) 60'; Pennington (red card) 67'	Report	Odoh (yellow card) 36'; Beesley 68' (pen.); Cashman 77'	Stadium: Montgomery Waters Meadow; Attendance: 2,229; Referee: Scott Oldham

=== EFL Trophy ===
Town were drawn into Northern Group C alongside Crewe Alexandra, Wigan Athletic and Wolverhampton Wanderers U21s. On July 6, the group stage ties were confirmed.

Pos	Div	Team	Pld	W	PW	PL	L	GF	GA	GD	Pts	Qualification
1	L1	Crewe Alexandra	3	3	0	0	0	6	0	+6	9	Advance to Round 2
2	L1	Wigan Athletic	3	1	0	1	1	2	2	0	4	Advance to Round 2
3	L1	Shrewsbury Town	3	1	0	0	2	3	4	−1	3	
4	ACA	Wolverhampton Wanderers U21	3	0	1	0	2	1	6	−5	2	

Source: EFL.com

31 August 2021 Group game 1	Shrewsbury Town	0–1	Crewe Alexandra	Shrewsbury
19:00 BST		Report	Knight 90+2'	Stadium: Montgomery Waters Meadow; Attendance: 1,680; Referee: Seb Stocksbridge

5 October 2021 Group game 2	Shrewsbury Town	3–1	Wolverhampton Wanderers U21	Shrewsbury
19:00 BST	Bloxham 72'; Lloyd 78'; Pyke 90+2'		Hesketh 31'	Stadium: Montgomery Waters Meadow; Attendance: 1,334

9 November 2021 Group game 3	Wigan Athletic	2–0	Shrewsbury Town	Wigan
19:00 GMT	Long 9'; Sze 53'; Smith (yellow card) 88'	Report	Wilson (yellow card) 4'; Leahy (yellow card) 84'	Stadium: DW Stadium; Attendance: 1,121; Referee: Scott Oldham

== Transfers ==
=== Transfers in ===
Date	Position	Nationality	Name	From	Fee	Ref.
17 June 2021	CF	(England)	Ryan Bowman	(England) Exeter City	Undisclosed	
24 June 2021	GK	(Slovakia)	Marko Maroši	(England) Coventry City	Undisclosed	
1 July 2021	RM	(Jamaica)	Elliott Bennett	(England) Blackburn Rovers	Free transfer	
1 July 2021	LB	(England)	Luke Leahy	(England) Bristol Rovers	Free transfer	
1 July 2021	CB	(England)	Matthew Pennington	(England) Everton	Free transfer	
28 July 2021	LB	(England)	George Nurse	(England) Bristol City	Undisclosed	
31 January 2022	CB	(Northern Ireland)	Tom Flanagan	(England) Sunderland	Undisclosed	

=== Loans in ===
Date from	Position	Nationality	Name	From	Date until	Ref.
11 August 2021	CF	(England)	Sam Cosgrove	(England) Birmingham City	31 January 2022	
19 August 2021	AM	(South Africa)	Khanya Leshabela	(England) Leicester City	January 2022	
1 January 2022	CF	(The Gambia)	Saikou Janneh	(England) Bristol City	End of season	
18 January 2022	CM	(England)	Tyrese Fornah	(England) Nottingham Forest	End of season	
31 January 2022	LB	(England)	Matthew Bondswell	(England) Newcastle United	29 March 2022	

=== Loans out ===
Date from	Position	Nationality	Name	To	Date until	Ref.
31 January 2022	CF	(England)	Rekeil Pyke	(England) Scunthorpe United	End of season	

=== Transfers out ===
Date	Position	Nationality	Name	To	Fee	Ref.
8 May 2021	LB	(England)	Scott Golbourne	Retired		
30 June 2021	AM	(England)	Ryan Barnett	(England) Solihull Moors	Released	
30 June 2021	CF	(England)	Leon Clarke	(England) Bristol Rovers	Released	
30 June 2021	CM	(Wales)	David Edwards	(Wales) Bala Town	Released	
30 June 2021	CM	(England)	Sean Goss		Released	
30 June 2021	RB	(Scotland)	Donald Love	(England) Salford City	Released	
30 June 2021	CF	(England)	Curtis Main	(Scotland) St Mirren	Released	
30 June 2021	CM	(England)	James Rowland	(Wales) Newtown AFC	Released	
30 June 2021	RB	(England)	Ryan Sears	(England) Grimsby Town	Released	
30 June 2021	DM	(England)	Brad Walker	(England) Port Vale	Released	
30 June 2021	CB	(England)	Ro-Shaun Williams	(England) Doncaster Rovers	Released	
10 August 2021	CM	(Grenada)	Oliver Norburn	(England) Peterborough United	Undisclosed	
31 January 2022	LB	(England)	Nathanael Ogbeta	(Wales) Swansea City	Undisclosed	
