= 2020–21 Shrewsbury Town F.C. season =

Shrewsbury Town
2020–21 season
- Chairman: Roland Wycherley
- Manager: Sam Ricketts (until 25 November); Steve Cotterill (from 27 November)
- Stadium: New Meadow
- League One: 17th
- FA Cup: Third round
- EFL Cup: First round
- EFL Trophy: Second round
- Top goalscorer: Shaun Whalley (9)
- Highest home attendance: 2,000 v Accrington Stanley, 2 December 2020
Home colours	Away colours

The 2020–21 Shrewsbury Town F.C. season was the Shrewsbury Town F.C. 135th edition in their history and the sixth consecutive season in EFL League One. The club also contested in the FA Cup, EFL Cup and EFL Trophy.

The season covered the period from 1 July 2020 to 30 June 2021.

== Transfers ==
=== Transfers in ===
Date	Pos.	Nat.	Name	From	Fee	Ref.
3 August 2020	RW	(Republic of Ireland)	Josh Daniels	(Northern Ireland) Glenavon	Undisclosed	
3 August 2020	CF	(England)	Rekeil Pyke	(England) Huddersfield Town	Free transfer	
25 September 2020	CF	(England)	Leon Clarke	(England) Sheffield United	Free transfer	
23 October 2020	LB	(England)	Charlie Daniels	(England) AFC Bournemouth	Free transfer	
26 October 2020	LW	(England)	Marc Pugh	(England) Queens Park Rangers	Free transfer	
15 January 2021	CM	(England)	David Davis	(England) Birmingham City	Free transfer	
25 January 2021	LB	(England)	Nathanael Ogbeta	(England) Manchester City	Undisclosed	
1 February 2021	CF	(England)	Curtis Main	(Scotland) Aberdeen	Undisclosed	

=== Loans in ===
Date	Pos.	Nat.	Name	From	Date until	Ref.
3 August 2020	CM	(England)	Scott High	(England) Huddersfield Town	29 December 2020	
28 August 2020	RB	(United States)	Marlon Fossey	(England) Fulham	29 December 2020	
2 September 2020	GK	(Montenegro)	Matija Sarkic	(England) Wolverhampton Wanderers	End of season	
18 September 2020	RW	(England)	Shilow Tracey	(England) Tottenham Hotspur	24 January 2021	
5 October 2020	RB	(Australia)	Matthew Millar	(Australia) Newcastle Jets	19 January 2021	
5 October 2020	CM	(Czech Republic)	Jan Žambůrek	(England) Brentford	11 January 2021	
8 October 2020	GK	(North Macedonia)	Dejan Iliev	(England) Arsenal	31 January 2021	
31 December 2020	RW	(England)	Harry Chapman	(England) Blackburn Rovers	End of season	
31 December 2020	CB	(England)	Matthew Pennington	(England) Everton	End of season	

=== Loans out ===
Date	Pos.	Nat.	Name	From	Date until	Ref.
13 October 2020	CM	(England)	James Rowland	(England) Barwell		
8 February 2021	AM	(England)	Ryan Barnett	(England) Gloucester City	March 2021	
18 March 2021	AM	(England)	Ryan Barnett	(England) Solihull Moors	April 2021	

=== Transfers out ===
Date	Pos.	Nat.	Name	To	Fee	Ref.
1 July 2020	GK	(Republic of Ireland)	Joe Murphy	(England) Tranmere Rovers	Released	
1 July 2020	CF	(England)	Lifumpa Mwandwe	(Wales) Newtown	Released	
1 July 2020	CM	(England)	Kian Taylor	(England) Coalville Town	Released	
1 July 2020	DM	(France)	Romain Vincelot	(England) Stevenage	Released	
28 July 2020	AM	(England)	Josh Laurent	(England) Reading	Free transfer	
13 August 2020	CB	(Grenada)	Omar Beckles	(England) Crewe Alexandra	Rejected contract	
25 September 2020	CB	(England)	Luke Ward	(England) Bromsgrove Sporting	Free transfer	
19 January 2021	LB	(England)	Charlie Daniels	(England) Portsmouth	Released	
19 January 2021	LW	(England)	Marc Pugh	Unattached	Released	
28 January 2021	CF	(Australia)	Jason Cummings	(Scotland) Dundee	Undisclosed	

== Squad ==
As of 9 May 2021

No.	Pos	Nat	Player	Total		League One		FA Cup		League Cup		League Trophy	
No.	Pos	Nat	Player	Apps	Goals	Apps	Goals	Apps	Goals	Apps	Goals	Apps	Goals
1	GK	(England) ENG	Harry Burgoyne	23	0	17+1	0	1+0	0	1+0	0	3+0	0
2	DF	(Grenada) GRN	Aaron Pierre	32	3	25+1	3	3+0	0	0+0	0	3+0	0
3	DF	(England) ENG	Scott Golbourne	16	0	6+4	0	1+1	0	1+0	0	3+0	0
4	MF	(Wales) WAL	David Edwards	36	1	5+26	1	2+1	0	1+0	0	1+0	0
5	DF	(England) ENG	Ro-Shaun Williams	46	0	39+1	0	3+0	0	1+0	0	1+1	0
6	MF	(Germany) GER	Sean Goss	23	3	15+5	3	1+0	0	0+0	0	2+0	0
7	MF	(England) ENG	Shaun Whalley	41	9	32+6	9	2+0	0	1+0	0	0+0	0
8	MF	(Grenada) GRN	Oliver Norburn	42	4	37+2	4	3+0	0	0+0	0	0+0	0
9	FW	(England) ENG	Rekeil Pyke	14	1	2+10	0	0+1	0	1+0	1	0+0	0
10	MF	(England) ENG	Josh Vela	49	2	43+1	2	2+0	0	0+0	0	3+0	0
11	FW	(England) ENG	Leon Clarke	10	1	6+4	1	0+0	0	0+0	0	0+0	0
12	DF	(Wales) WAL	Ryan Sears	7	0	2+3	0	0+1	0	0+0	0	1+0	0
14	DF	(England) ENG	Nathanael Ogbeta	25	2	25+0	2	0+0	0	0+0	0	0+0	0
16	MF	(England) ENG	Brad Walker	27	2	15+8	1	1+0	1	1+0	0	2+0	0
17	DF	(Scotland) SCO	Donald Love	18	0	12+2	0	0+0	0	1+0	0	2+1	0
19	MF	(England) ENG	Ryan Barnett	12	2	3+4	0	0+1	0	0+0	0	3+1	2
20	FW	(England) ENG	Curtis Main	20	2	14+6	2	0+0	0	0+0	0	0+0	0
21	GK	(England) ENG	Cameron Gregory	0	0	0+0	0	0+0	0	0+0	0	0+0	0
22	DF	(Republic of Ireland) IRL	Joshua Daniels	24	1	8+11	1	1+0	0	0+1	0	2+1	0
23	FW	(Nigeria) NGR	Daniel Udoh	44	5	23+16	4	2+1	1	0+1	0	1+0	0
24	DF	(England) ENG	Ethan Ebanks-Landell	47	1	41+0	1	2+1	0	1+0	0	2+0	0
26	MF	(England) ENG	James Rowland	0	0	0+0	0	0+0	0	0+0	0	0+0	0
28	MF	(England) ENG	David Davis	21	0	14+7	0	0+0	0	0+0	0	0+0	0
29	MF	(England) ENG	Matthew Pennington	20	2	18+1	2	1+0	0	0+0	0	0+0	0
30	FW	(England) ENG	Charlie Caton	5	0	1+2	0	0+0	0	0+0	0	0+2	0
31	GK	(Montenegro) MNE	Matija Sarkic	29	0	26	0	2+0	0	0+0	0	1+0	0
32	MF	(England) ENG	Harry Chapman	24	7	16+7	7	1+0	0	0+0	0	0+0	0
39	FW	(England) ENG	Tom Bloxham	4	0	2+2	0	0+0	0	0+0	0	0+0	0
Players who left the club:
13	MF	(Czech Republic) CZE	Jan Žambůrek	9	0	4+2	0	0+0	0	0+0	0	3+0	0
14	MF	(Australia) AUS	Matthew Millar	13	2	9+0	1	0+2	0	0+0	0	1+1	1
15	DF	(England) ENG	Charlie Daniels	16	2	14+0	1	2+0	1	0+0	0	0+0	0
18	DF	(United States) USA	Marlon Fossey	9	0	6+1	0	0+0	0	0+1	0	1+0	0
20	MF	(England) ENG	Shilow Tracey	12	4	2+6	0	0+1	0	0+0	0	3+0	4
25	DF	(England) ENG	Scott High	17	2	8+4	0	1+0	0	1+0	1	3+0	1
27	MF	(England) ENG	Marc Pugh	10	1	6+2	1	2+0	0	0+0	0	0+0	0
33	GK	(North Macedonia) MKD	Dejan Iliev	3	0	3+0	0	0+0	0	0+0	0	0+0	0
35	FW	(Australia) AUS	Jason Cummings	17	3	7+4	0	0+2	0	1+0	1	3+0	2

== Pre-season ==
On 10 August, the club announced a pre-season friendly against Southern League Premier Division Central side Nuneaton Borough which would be played at the New Bucks Head ground, the home of AFC Telford United. However, the club's pre-season kicked off with a friendly against Welsh Premier League side Bala Town which was not announced to the public.

All of the club's pre-season games would be played behind closed doors due to the ongoing COVID-19 pandemic.

11 August 2020 Friendly	Shrewsbury Town	3–0	Bala Town	Wellington
	Caton; Daniels; Cummings			Stadium: New Bucks Head; Attendance: 0 (behind closed doors)

18 August 2020 Friendly	Shrewsbury Town	3–1	Nuneaton Borough	Wellington
	Pierre; Sears; Barnett		Gordon	Stadium: New Bucks Head; Attendance: 0 (behind closed doors)

21 August 2020 Friendly	Shrewsbury Town	0–1	Walsall	Wellington
12:00 BST			Kinsella 81'	Stadium: New Bucks Head; Attendance: 0 (behind closed doors)

25 August 2020 Friendly	Stoke City	5–1	Shrewsbury Town	Trent Vale
	Oakley-Boothe; Obi Mikel; Martins Indi; Afobe; Campbell		Whalley (pen.)	Stadium: Clayton Wood Training Ground; Attendance: 0 (behind closed doors)

25 August 2020 Friendly	Wolverhampton Wanderers U23	0–1	Shrewsbury Town	Wellington
19:00 BST			Udoh (pen.)	Stadium: New Bucks Head; Attendance: 0 (behind closed doors)

29 August 2020 Friendly	Burnley	1–2	Shrewsbury Town	Burnley
12:30 BST	Wood (pen.)		High; Whalley	Stadium: Barnfield Training Ground; Attendance: 0 (behind closed doors)

8 September 2020 Friendly	Whitchurch Alport	P–P	Shrewsbury Town XI	Whitchurch
19:45 BST				Stadium: Yockings Park

== Competitions ==
=== Overview ===
Competition	First match	Last match	Starting round	Record							
Competition	First match	Last match	Starting round	Pld	W	D	L	GF	GA	GD	Win %
EFL League One	12 September 2020	09 May 2021	Matchday 1	46	13	15	18	50	57	−7	28.26
FA Cup	8 November 2020	19 January 2021	First round	3	2	0	1	3	2	+1	66.67
EFL Cup	4 September 2020	04 September 2020	First round	1	0	0	1	3	4	−1	0.00
EFL Trophy	22 September 2020	08 December 2020	Group Stage	4	3	0	1	10	8	+2	75.00
Total				54	18	15	21	66	71	−5	33.33

Last updated: 09 May 2021
Source: Competitions

=== EFL League One ===
==== League table ====
Pos	Team	Pld	W	D	L	GF	GA	GD	Pts	Promotion, qualification or relegation
13	Milton Keynes Dons	46	18	11	17	64	62	+2	65	
14	Doncaster Rovers	46	19	7	20	63	67	−4	64	
15	Fleetwood Town	46	16	12	18	49	46	+3	60	
16	Burton Albion	46	15	12	19	61	73	−12	57	
17	Shrewsbury Town	46	13	15	18	50	57	−7	54	
18	Plymouth Argyle	46	14	11	21	53	80	−27	53	
19	AFC Wimbledon	46	12	15	19	54	70	−16	51	
20	Wigan Athletic	46	13	9	24	54	77	−23	48	
21	Rochdale (R)	46	11	14	21	61	78	−17	47	Relegation to EFL League Two

Source: EFL Official Website
Rules for classification: 1) Points; 2) Goal difference; 3) Number of goals scored; 4) Head-to-head results; 5) Wins; 6) Away goals; 7) Penalty points (sec 9.5); 8) 12-point sending off offences
(R) Relegated

==== Results summary ====
Overall								Home						Away					
Pld	W	D	L	GF	GA	GD	Pts	W	D	L	GF	GA	GD	W	D	L	GF	GA	GD
46	13	15	18	50	57	−7	54	5	8	10	28	31	−3	8	7	8	22	26	−4

Last updated: 9 May 2021.
Source: BBC

==== Results by matchday ====
Matchday	1	2	3	4	5	6	7	8	9	10	11	12	13	14	15	16	17	18	19	20	21	22	23	24	25	26	27	28	29	30	31	32	33	34	35	36	37	38	39	40	41	42	43	44	45	46
Ground	A	H	A	H	A	H	H	A	A	H	H	A	A	H	H	A	A	A	A	H	A	H	H	A	H	A	H	A	H	H	A	A	H	A	H	A	H	A	A	H	H	A	H	H	H	A
Result	D	L	D	D	W	L	L	L	L	D	D	L	D	D	D	W	W	W	D	W	L	W	L	W	W	D	W	L	D	L	W	D	D	W	L	L	W	D	L	L	L	W	L	L	D	L
Position	16	19	20	19	16	18	20	21	22	22	22	22	23	23	23	22	21	16	17	16	17	17	17	17	17	17	16	17	17	17	17	17	17	17	17	17	17	17	18	18	18	16	17	17	17	17

Updated to match(es) played on 04 May 2021. Source: 11v11 for league tables and fixtures
A = Away; H = Home; W = Win; D = Draw; L = Loss

==== Matches ====
The season's League One fixtures were announced on 21 August.

12 September 2020 1	Portsmouth	0–0	Shrewsbury Town	Portsmouth
15:00		Report	Pierre (yellow card) 28' (yellow-red card) 90+4'	Stadium: Fratton Park; Attendance: 0 Referee: Charles Breakspear

19 September 2020 2	Shrewsbury Town	1–2	Northampton Town	Shrewsbury
15:00	Whalley 54'		Marshall 12'; Hoskins 65'	Stadium: New Meadow; Attendance: 1,000; Referee: Neil Hair

26 September 2020 3	Plymouth Argyle	1–1	Shrewsbury Town	Plymouth
15:00	Grant 29'		Vela 14'	Stadium: Home Park; Attendance: 0 Referee: Tim Robinson

3 October 2020 4	Shrewsbury Town	1–1	Gillingham	Shrewsbury
15:00 BST	Walker 12'; Pierre (yellow card) 56'; Norburn (yellow card) 75'	Report	Drysdale (yellow card) 73'; Graham 90+4'	Stadium: New Meadow; Attendance: 0 Referee: James Adcock

10 October 2020	Doncaster Rovers	v	Shrewsbury Town	Doncaster
				Stadium: Keepmoat Stadium

17 October 2020 5	AFC Wimbledon	0–1	Shrewsbury Town	London
			Clarke 90+1'	Stadium: Kiyan Prince Foundation Stadium; Attendance: 0 Referee: Josh Smith

20 October 2020 6	Shrewsbury Town	0–1	Bristol Rovers	Shrewsbury
18:00 BST	Walker (yellow card) 37'	Report	Hanlan 15'; Grant (yellow card) 57'; Harries (yellow card) 66'	Stadium: New Meadow; Attendance: 0 Referee: Alan Young

24 October 2020 7	Shrewsbury Town	1–2	Rochdale	Shrewsbury
15:00 BST	Vela (yellow card) 39'; Pierre 45+2' (yellow card) 86'; Fossey (yellow card) 59'	Report	Rathbone 22'; Newby 36'	Stadium: Montgomery Waters Meadow; Attendance: 0 Referee: Carl Brook

27 October 2020 8	Fleetwood Town	1–0	Shrewsbury Town	Fleetwood
19:45 GMT	Evans 25' (yellow card) 36'	Report	Daniels (yellow card) 59'	Stadium: Highbury Stadium; Attendance: 0 Referee: Bobby Madley

31 October 2020 9	Peterborough United	5–1	Shrewsbury Town	Peterborough
15:00 GMT	Clarke-Harris 16' (pen.); Dembélé 42', 69', 80'; Brown (yellow card) 50'; Szmodics (yellow card) 84'; Taylor 88'	Report	Burgoyne (yellow card) 16'; Daniels 18'; Vela (red card) 45+2'; Norburn (yellow card) 58'; Ebanks-Landell (yellow card) 77'	Stadium: Weston Homes Stadium; Attendance: 0 Referee: James Oldham

3 November 2020 10	Shrewsbury Town	1–1	Burton Albion	Shrewsbury
18:00 GMT	Udoh (yellow card) 65' (goal) 90+9'; Daniels (yellow card) 76'; Ebanks-Landell (yellow card) 88'	Report	Edwards (yellow card) 24'; Hemmings 59'; O'Hara (yellow card) 86'; Varney (yellow card) 90+5'	Stadium: Montgomery Waters Meadow; Attendance: 0 Referee: Anthony Backhouse

14 November 2020 11	Shrewsbury Town	3–3	Swindon Town	Shrewsbury
15:00 GMT	Pierre 11'; Millar 16'; Edwards (yellow card) 33' (goal) 56'; Norburn (yellow card) 88'	Report	Hope (yellow card) 24' (goal) 61'; A. Grant (yellow card) 27'; J. Grant 43'; Smith 90+3'	Stadium: Montgomery Waters Meadow; Attendance: 0 Referee: Sam Allison

21 November 2020 12	Ipswich Town	2–1	Shrewsbury Town	Ipswich
15:00 GMT	Lankester (yellow card) 62' (goal) 90+7'; Ebanks-Landell 75' (o.g.)	Report	Norburn 4' (pen.) (yellow card) 33'; Ebanks-Landell (yellow card) 90+3'	Stadium: Portman Road; Attendance: 0 Referee: Tim Robinson

24 November 2020 13	Milton Keynes Dons	2–2	Shrewsbury Town	Milton Keynes
19:00 GMT	Fraser (yellow card) 37'; Morris 54'; Jerome 70'; Sorinola (yellow card) 82'	Report	Whalley 1'; Pugh 49'; High (yellow card) 53'	Stadium: Stadium MK; Attendance: 0 Referee: Darren Drysdale

1 December 2020 14	Shrewsbury Town	2–2	Accrington Stanley	Shrewsbury
19:45 GMT	Pierre 26'; Whalley 86'	Report	Pritchard 24'; Cassidy 90+5' (pen.)	Stadium: New Meadow; Attendance: 2,000; Referee: Benjamin Speedie

5 December 2020 15	Shrewsbury Town	1–1	Charlton Athletic	Shrewsbury
15:00 GMT	Norburn 90+5' (pen.)	Report	Watson 71'	Stadium: New Meadow; Attendance: 2,000; Referee: Anthony Backhouse

12 December 2020 16	Hull City	0–1	Shrewsbury Town	Kingston upon Hull
15:00 GMT		Report	C. Daniels 27'	Stadium: KCOM Stadium; Attendance: 0 Referee: Andy Haines

15 December 2020 17	Lincoln City	0–1	Shrewsbury Town	Lincoln
19:00 GMT		Report	Whalley 38'	Stadium: Sincil Bank; Attendance: 0 Referee: Craig Hicks

19 December 2020	Shrewsbury Town	v	Sunderland	Shrewsbury
				Stadium: New Meadow

22 December 2020 18	Doncaster Rovers	0–1	Shrewsbury Town	Doncaster
19:45 GMT		Report	Pierre 53'	Stadium: Keepmoat Stadium; Attendance: 0 Referee: James Oldham

26 December 2020 19	Wigan Athletic	1–1	Shrewsbury Town	Wigan
15:00 GMT	Keane 47' (pen.)		Whalley 66'	Stadium: DW Stadium; Attendance: 0 Referee: Sebastian Stockbridge

29 December 2020 20	Shrewsbury Town	1–0	Blackpool	Shrewsbury
19:45 GMT	Udoh 38'			Stadium: New Meadow; Referee: Neil Hair

2 January 2021	Shrewsbury Town	v	Crewe Alexandra	Shrewsbury
				Stadium: New Meadow

9 January 2021	Oxford United	v	Shrewsbury Town	Oxford
				Stadium: Kassam Stadium

16 January 2021	Shrewsbury Town	v	Lincoln City	Shrewsbury
				Stadium: New Meadow

23 January 2021 21	Sunderland	1–0	Shrewsbury Town	Sunderland
15:00 GMT	Wyke 18'; McGeady (yellow card) 28'; Leadbitter (yellow card) 76'	Report	Pierre (yellow card) 74'; Vela (yellow card) 90+2'	Stadium: Stadium of Light; Attendance: 0 Referee: Sam Barrott

26 January 2021	Burton Albion	v	Shrewsbury Town	Burton upon Trent
				Stadium: Pirelli Stadium

30 January 2021 22	Shrewsbury Town	2–0	Peterborough United	Shrewsbury
	Chapman 51', 86'			Stadium: New Meadow; Attendance: 0 Referee: Kevin Johnson

2 February 2021 23	Shrewsbury Town	0–1	Crewe Alexandra	Shrewsbury
19:00 GMT	Whalley (yellow card) 38'; Chapman (yellow card) 76'	Report	Pickering (yellow card) 11'; Dale 27'; Beckles (yellow card) 74'; Lancashire (yellow card) 85'	Stadium: New Meadow; Attendance: 0 Referee: Marc Edwards

6 February 2021 24	Swindon Town	0–1	Shrewsbury Town	Swindon
15:00			Chapman 34'	Stadium: County Ground; Attendance: 0 Referee: Antony Goggins

9 February 2021 25	Shrewsbury Town	2–1	Sunderland	Shrewsbury
19:00	Ebanks-Landall 52'; Chapman 67'		O'Brien 21'	Stadium: New Meadow; Attendance: 0 Referee: Will Finnie

13 February 2021	Shrewsbury Town	v	Ipswich Town	Shrewsbury
				Stadium: New Meadow

20 February 2021 26	Accrington Stanley	1–1	Shrewsbury Town	Accrington
15:00 GMT	Barclay (yellow card) 14'; Conneely (yellow card) 45+1' (goal) 47'; Morgan (yellow card) 80'	Report	Main (yellow card) 56'; Whalley 77'	Stadium: Wham Stadium; Attendance: 0 Referee: Alan Young

23 February 2021 27	Shrewsbury Town	4–2	Milton Keynes Dons	Shrewsbury
19:00 GMT	Goss 4', 57'; Norburn 8' (pen.), (yellow card) 63'; Main 20' (pen.); Daniels (yellow card) 81'; Edwards (yellow card) 90+5'	Report	Grigg 22'; Jerome (yellow card) 59'; Brown 82'; Darling (yellow card) 90+5'	Stadium: Montgomery Waters Meadow; Attendance: 0 Referee: Leigh Doughty

27 February 2021 28	Bristol Rovers	2–1	Shrewsbury Town	Bristol
15:00 GMT	Leahy 45'; Hanlan 60'	Report	Ebanks-Landell (yellow card) 70'; Udoh 90+2'	Stadium: Memorial Stadium; Attendance: 0 Referee: Paul Howard

2 March 2021 29	Shrewsbury Town	1–1	AFC Wimbledon	Shrewsbury
19:00 GMT	Chapman 35'	Report	McLoughlin (yellow card) 67'; Assal 84'	Stadium: Montgomery Waters Meadow; Attendance: 0 Referee: James Adcock

6 March 2021 30	Shrewsbury Town	0–2	Fleetwood Town	Shrewsbury
15:00 GMT		Report	Burns 45'; Vassell 70'	Stadium: Montgomery Waters Meadow; Attendance: 0 Referee: Michael Salisbury

9 March 2021 31	Rochdale	0–2	Shrewsbury Town	Rochdale
19:00 GMT	McShane (yellow card) 26'; Baah (yellow card) 72'	Report	Williams (yellow card) 19'; Daniels 55'; Vela 64'	Stadium: Spotland; Attendance: 0 Referee: Martin Coy

13 March 2021 32	Charlton Athletic	1–1	Shrewsbury Town	Charlton
15:00 GMT	Pratley (yellow card) 25'; Maatsen (yellow card) 50'; Washington 78'	Report	Goss 56'; Walker (yellow card) 69'; Williams (yellow card) 88'	Stadium: The Valley; Attendance: 0 Referee: Declan Bourne

20 March 2021 33	Shrewsbury Town	1–1	Hull City	Shrewsbury
	Ingram 53' (o.g.)		Docherty 62'	Stadium: New Meadow; Attendance: 0 Referee: Gavin Ward

23 March 2021 34	Burton Albion	1–2	Shrewsbury Town	Burton upon Trent
19:00 GMT	Clare 60'	Report	Main 6', (yellow card) 90'; Chapman 56'; Ogbeta (yellow card) 78'	Stadium: Pirelli Stadium; Attendance: 0 Referee: Carl Boyeson

27 March 2021 35	Shrewsbury Town	1–2	Portsmouth	Shrewsbury
15:00 GMT	Ogbeta 52'	Report	Harness 25'; Marquis 36', (red card) 68'	Stadium: New Meadow; Attendance: 0 Referee: Ben Speedie

2 April 2021 36	Northampton Town	1–0	Shrewsbury Town	Northampton
15:00 BST	Watson 27'; Mills (yellow card) 53'; Hoskins (yellow card) 90+1'; McWilliams (yellow card) 90+3'	Report		Stadium: PTS Academy Stadium; Attendance: 0 Referee: Ross Joyce

5 April 2021 37	Shrewsbury Town	3–0	Plymouth Argyle	Shrewsbury
	Whalley 52', 77'; Ogbeta 81'			Stadium: New Meadow; Attendance: 0

10 April 2021 38	Gillingham	0–0	Shrewsbury Town	Gillingham
15:00				Stadium: Priestfield Stadium; Attendance: 0 Referee: Trevor Kettle

13 April 2021 39	Oxford United	4–1	Shrewsbury Town	Oxford
19:00 BST	Atkinson 13'; Lee 36'; Taylor 66'; Brannagan (yellow card) 74'; Long 77'	Report	Chapman 51'; Vela (yellow card) 64'; Norburn (yellow card) 74'	Stadium: The Kassam Stadium; Attendance: 0 Referee: Sam Purkiss

17 April 2021 40	Shrewsbury Town	0–2	Doncaster Rovers	Shrewsbury
12:30 BST		Report	Okenabirhie 15'; Richards 80'	Stadium: Montgomery Waters Meadow; Attendance: 0 Referee: Andy Davies

20 April 2021 41	Shrewsbury Town	1–2	Wigan Athletic	Shrewsbury
19:00 BST	Vela (yellow card) 38'; Norburn 66'; Ebanks-Landell (yellow card) 76'; Whalley (yellow card) 90'	Report	Keane 27'; Lang 45+1'; Ojo (yellow card) 82'; Gardner (yellow card) 90+1'	Stadium: New Meadow; Attendance: 0 Referee: David Rock

24 April 2021 42	Blackpool	0–1	Shrewsbury Town	Blackpool
			Pennington 53'	Stadium: Bloomfield Road; Referee: James Bell

27 April 2021 43	Shrewsbury Town	0–1	Lincoln City	Shrewsbury
19:00 BST	Norburn (yellow card) 3'; Whalley (yellow card) 23'; Davis (yellow card) 45+3'; Vela (yellow card) 82'; Ebanks-Landell (yellow card) 89'	Report	Grant 11'; Rogers (yellow card) 65'	Stadium: Montgomery Waters Meadow; Attendance: 0 Referee: Ollie Yates

1 May 2021 44	Shrewsbury Town	2–3	Oxford United	Shrewsbury
15:00 BST	Pennington 16'; Vela 25'; Walker (yellow card) 62'	Report	Lee 3'; Henry 68'; Agyei 85', (yellow card) 90+6'	Stadium: Montgomery Waters Meadow; Attendance: 0 Referee: Sam Barrott

4 May 2021 45	Shrewsbury Town	0–0	Ipswich Town	Shrewsbury
19:00 BST	Pennington (yellow card) 27'; Vela (yellow card) 55'	Report	Norwood (yellow card) 44'; Woolfenden (yellow card) 61'	Stadium: Montgomery Waters Meadow; Attendance: 0 Referee: Lee Swabey

9 May 2021 46	Crewe Alexandra	3–2	Shrewsbury Town	Crewe
12:00 BST	Mandron 10', 21'; Porter 81'	Report	Whalley 34'; Udoh 42'	Stadium: Alexandra Stadium; Attendance: 0 Referee: Anthony Backhouse

Win Draw Loss Postponed

=== FA Cup ===
The draw for the first round was made on Monday 26, October. The second round draw was revealed on Monday, 9 November by Danny Cowley. The third round draw was made on 30 November, with Premier League and EFL Championship all entering the competition.

Win Draw Loss

8 November 2020 First round	Cambridge United	0–2	Shrewsbury Town	Cambridge
15:00 GMT			Daniels 47'; Walker 89'	Stadium: Abbey Stadium; Attendance: 0 Referee: Peter Wright

29 November 2020 Second round	Shrewsbury Town	1–0 (a.e.t.)	Oxford City	Shrewsbury
13:30 GMT	Goss (yellow card) 67'; Pierre (red card) 81'; Udoh 108'	Report	Owusu (yellow card) 38'; Fleet (yellow card) 63'; Roberts (red card) 81'	Stadium: Montgomery Waters Meadow; Attendance: 0 Referee: Christopher Pollard

19 January 2021 Third round	Southampton	2–0	Shrewsbury Town	Southampton
20:00 GMT	N'Lundulu 16'; Chauke (yellow card) 46'; Ward-Prowse 89'	Report		Stadium: St Mary's Stadium; Attendance: 0 Referee: Simon Hooper

=== EFL Cup ===
Win Draw Loss

The first round draw took place in the morning of 18 August.

4 September 2020 First round	Middlesbrough	4–3	Shrewsbury Town	Middlesbrough
17:30 BST	Johnson 21'; Fletcher 31', 53'; Tavernier 65'	Report	High 13'; Cummings 60'; Pyke 73'; Williams (yellow card) 81'	Stadium: Riverside Stadium; Attendance: 0 Referee: Michael Salisbury

=== EFL Trophy ===
Win Draw Loss

The regional group stage draw was confirmed on 18 August. The second round draw was made by Matt Murray on 20 November, at St Andrew's.

Pos	Div	Team	Pld	W	PW	PL	L	GF	GA	GD	Pts	Qualification
1	L1	Shrewsbury Town	3	3	0	0	0	9	4	+5	9	Advance to Round 2
2	L1	Crewe Alexandra	3	2	0	0	1	7	6	+1	6	Advance to Round 2
3	L2	Bolton Wanderers	3	1	0	0	2	6	7	−1	3	
4	ACA	Newcastle United U21	3	0	0	0	3	2	7	−5	0	

Source: EFL.com

22 September 2020 Group stage	Shrewsbury Town	3–0	Newcastle United U21	Shrewsbury
17:30 BST	High 11'; Barnett 18'; Walker (yellow card) 39'; Cummings (yellow card) 46' (goal) 56'	Report		Stadium: Montgomery Waters Meadow; Attendance: 0 Referee: Scott Oldham

6 October 2020 Group stage	Shrewsbury Town	2–1	Bolton Wanderers	Shrewsbury
17:30 BST	Barnett 19'; Walker (yellow card) 23'; Vela (yellow card) 32'; Cummings 43' (yellow card) 45+3'; Pierre (yellow card) 78'; High (yellow card) 85'	Report	Senior 64' (yellow card) 80'	Stadium: Montgomery Waters Meadow; Attendance: 0 Referee: Ollie Yates

10 November 2020 Group stage	Crewe Alexandra	3–4	Shrewsbury Town	Crewe
18:00 GMT	Griffiths (yellow card) 31'; Powell 34', 60'; Zanzala 40'	Report	Ebanks-Landell (yellow card) 13'; Millar 17'; Tracey 25', 76', 82'; Pierre (yellow card) 45+2'; Love (yellow card) 48'; Barnett (yellow card) 90+3'	Stadium: Alexandra Stadium; Attendance: 0 Referee: Declan Bourne

8 December 2020 Second round	Shrewsbury Town	1–4	Lincoln City	Shrewsbury
19:00 GMT	Tracey 44'	Report	Scully 18'; McGrandles (yellow card) 29'; Elbouzedi 40'; Howarth 67'; Grant 78' (pen.)	Stadium: Montgomery Waters Meadow; Attendance: 0 Referee: Ben Toner
