= Nathanael Ogbeta =

English footballer (born 2001)

Personal information
- Full name: Nathanael Simeon Ogbeta
- Date of birth: 28 April 2001 (age 25)
- Place of birth: Salford, England
- Height: 1.84 m (6 ft 0 in)
- Position: Left-back

Team information
- Current team: Marítimo
- Number: 3

Youth career
- 2011–2021: Manchester City

Senior career*
Years	Team	Apps	(Gls)
2021–2022	Shrewsbury Town	51	(2)
2022–2024	Swansea City	2	(0)
2023	→ Peterborough United (loan)	20	(1)
2024	→ Bolton Wanderers (loan)	15	(2)
2024–2026	Plymouth Argyle	17	(1)
2025–2026	→ Barnsley (loan)	23	(0)
2026–	Marítimo	0	(0)

International career^{‡}
2018	England U17	4	(0)
2018–2019	England U18	12	(0)
2022	England U20	1	(0)
- * Club domestic league appearances and goals as of 17:11, 21 March 2026 (UTC) ‡ National team caps and goals as of 21:51, 30 March 2022 (UTC)

Nathanael Simeon Ogbeta (born 28 April 2001) is an English professional footballer who plays as a left-back for Portuguese club Marítimo.

== Early and personal life ==
Ogbeta was born in Salford, Greater Manchester. His sister Naomi is an athlete. He is a devout Christian.

== Career ==
Ogbeta joined Manchester City at the age of ten. He made his debut for the Manchester City U18 team during the 2018–19 season in a 4–2 win over Reading. During the 2019–20 season, Ogbeta made two appearances for the Manchester City U21s in the EFL Trophy in games against Scunthorpe United and Tranmere Rovers.

On 25 January 2021, Ogbeta signed for League One side Shrewsbury Town on an 18-month deal. He made his debut for The Shrews on 30 January, starting in a 2–0 win at home to Peterborough United.

On 31 January 2022, Ogbeta joined EFL Championship side Swansea City on a two-and-a-half-year contract, for an undisclosed fee. After getting limited game time with Swansea, on 13 January 2023 he joined League One side Peterborough United on loan until the end of the season. He scored his first Peterborough goal on 25 March 2023 in a 2–0 win over Derby County.

He moved on loan to Bolton Wanderers in January 2024. He scored on his debut, in a 4–1 away win at Carlisle.

He was released by Swansea at the end of the 2023–24 season, and signed for Plymouth Argyle with effect from 1 July 2024. He scored his first goal for Plymouth on 25 January 2025, a last-minute equaliser in a 2–2 draw at Sunderland.

On 26 June 2025, he joined Barnsley on loan for the 2025–26 season.

He was released by Plymouth at the end of the 2025–26 season.

In July 2026 he signed for Portuguese club Marítimo.

== International career ==
Born in England, Ogbeta is of Nigerian and Jamaican descent. He was a youth international for England.

On 29 March 2022, Ogbeta made his England U20 debut in a 3–1 victory over Germany in Colchester.

== Career statistics ==
As of match played 21 March 2026

Appearances and goals by club, season and competition
Club	Season	League			FA Cup		League Cup		Other		Total	
Club	Season	Division	Apps	Goals	Apps	Goals	Apps	Goals	Apps	Goals	Apps	Goals
Manchester City U-21s	2018–19	—	—		—		—		6 (Note: Appearance(s) in the EFL Trophy.)	0	6	0
Manchester City U-21s	2019–20	—	—		—		—		4	0	4	0
Manchester City U-21s	2020–21	—	—		—		—		2	0	2	0
Manchester City U-21s	Total		0	0	0	0	0	0	12	0	12	0
Shrewsbury Town	2020–21	League One	25	2	0	0	0	0	0	0	25	2
Shrewsbury Town	2021–22	League One	26	0	3	0	1	0	3	0	33	0
Shrewsbury Town	Total		51	2	3	0	1	0	3	0	58	2
Swansea City	2021–22	Championship	2	0	0	0	0	0	0	0	2	0
Swansea City	2022–23	Championship	0	0	0	0	1	0	0	0	1	0
Swansea City	2023–24	Championship	0	0	0	0	0	0	0	0	0	0
Swansea City	Total		2	0	0	0	1	0	0	0	3	0
Peterborough United (loan)	2022–23	League One	20	1	0	0	0	0	0	0	20	1
Bolton Wanderers (loan)	2023–24	League One	15	2	0	0	0	0	2	0	17	2
Plymouth Argyle	2024–25	Championship	17	1	2	0	1	0	0	0	20	1
Plymouth Argyle	2025–26	League One	0	0	0	0	0	0	0	0	0	0
Plymouth Argyle	Total		17	1	2	0	1	0	0	0	20	1
Barnsley (loan)	2025–26	League One	23	0	2	0	3	0	2	0	30	0
Career total			128	6	7	0	6	0	19	0	160	6
