= Aaron Pierre (footballer) =

Grenadian footballer (born 1993)

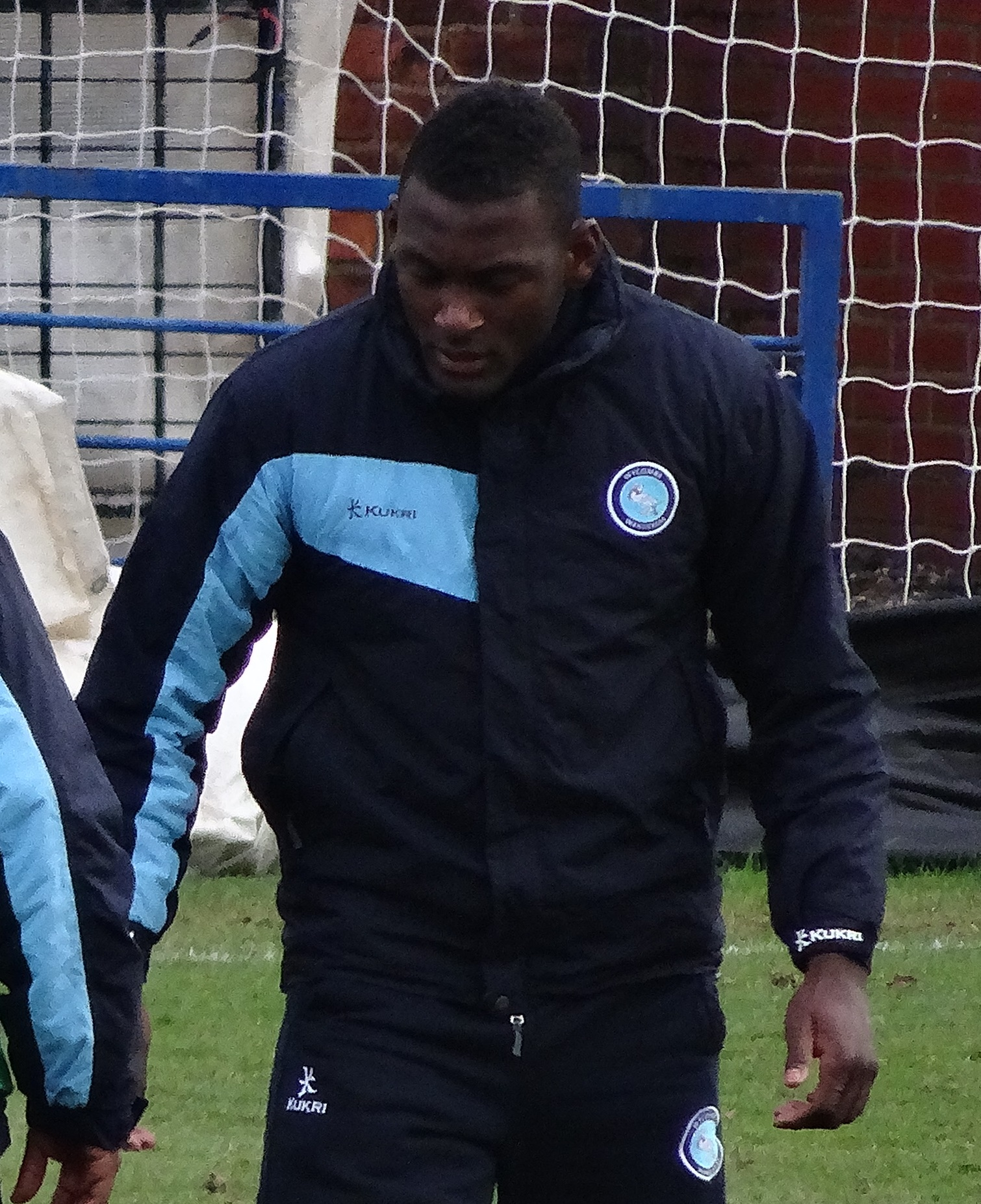
- Pierre in 2014

Personal information
- Full name: Aaron Jordan Pierre
- Date of birth: 17 February 1993 (age 33)
- Place of birth: acton, England
- Height: 1.91 m (6 ft 3 in)
- Position: Centre back

Team information
- Current team: Eastleigh
- Number: 16

Youth career
- 2008–2011: Fulham
- 2011–2012: Brentford

Senior career*
Years	Team	Apps	(Gls)
2012–2014	Brentford	6	(0)
2013–2014	→ Cambridge United (loan)	1	(1)
2014	→ Wycombe Wanderers (loan)	8	(1)
2014–2017	Wycombe Wanderers	146	(12)
2017–2019	Northampton Town	60	(10)
2019–2022	Shrewsbury Town	99	(7)
2022–2023	Sutton United	2	(0)
2023	AFC Wimbledon	11	(1)
2023–2025	Shrewsbury Town	54	(4)
2025–	Eastleigh	31	(3)

International career^{‡}
2015–	Grenada	28	(1)
- * Club domestic league appearances and goals as of 21:52, 17 July 2025 (UTC) ‡ National team caps and goals as of 13:06, 4 December 2023 (UTC)

Aaron Jordan Pierre (born 17 February 1993) is a professional footballer who plays as a centre back for National League club Eastleigh and also for the Grenada national team.

He began his career in the academy at Premier League club Fulham, before joining League One club Brentford in 2011. He was Shrewsbury Town's Player of the Year in 2019–20.

== Club career ==
=== Brentford ===
Pierre was born in Southall, Greater London. He started his career in the youth system at Fulham, but was released in 2011. Pierre (along with former Fulham youth teammates Jonathan Cosgrove, Albert Owusu-Ansah and Michael Kamau) joined League One side Brentford on trial in April 2011 and was the only one of the four to earn a contract.

Pierre was made part of the Development Squad for its inaugural season in 2011–12. He made his professional debut for the Bees on 4 December 2012, in a 2–1 defeat to Southend United in the Football League Trophy, coming on as a substitute for Jake Bidwell. Pierre was an unused substitute on four further occasions during the 2012–13 season.

Towards the end of the campaign, Pierre spent a period training with Brentford's Icelandic partner club UMF Selfoss. Pierre was the leading appearance-maker for the Development Squad in the 2012–13 season, making 19 starts and scoring two goals, in addition to his solitary first team appearance.

On 20 June 2013, he signed a new one-year contract which will tie him to the club until the summer of 2014. He made his first appearance of the 2013–14 season on 27 August 2013, coming on at half time for Scott Barron in a 5–0 League Cup defeat away at Derby County. His second appearance came in a 5–3 Football League Trophy first round win over AFC Wimbledon the following week, again replacing Scott Barron at half time.

Pierre was made available for loan in October 2013 and attracted interest from Conference Premier clubs Aldershot Town and Cambridge United. Pierre was again made available for loan in February 2014, but expressed a desire to open talks over a new contract the following month. Though he spent portions of the 2013–14 season out on loan, Pierre finished the campaign with two first team appearances and 12 Development Squad appearances.

In early May, it was reported that Pierre had been offered a new contract, after impressing in his loan spells away from Griffin Park during the 2013–14 season. On 16 May, it was reported that Pierre turned down the contract offer and left the club. He made three first team appearances during his three years with the Bees.

==== Cambridge United (loan) ====
Pierre moved on loan to Conference Premier side Cambridge United on 28 November 2013, initially until 4 January 2014. Brentford Development Squad manager Jon de Souza vouched for what Pierre could gain from Cambridge boss Richard Money, with de Souza having worked as youth team manager under Money while at Luton Town.

After missing a few games through injury, Pierre was named on the bench for an FA Trophy second round tie at St Albans City on 14 December. After replacing Josh Gillies on 69 minutes and with the score at 1–1, Pierre smashed home a 25-yard shot in the third minute of injury time to send Cambridge through to the third round. After the game, Pierre said "hopefully working with him (Money) for a little bit longer will help me improve and to cut out all the silly errors in my game. I'll just see how things go here, but hopefully I can just progress and if the gaffer wants me to stay a little bit longer then I'd do that".

After just one appearance, Pierre returned to Brentford on 6 January 2014. Brentford academy director Ose Aibangee commented that "even though Aaron's game time was limited at Cambridge, the atmosphere and experience of being involved in a squad pushing for promotion to the Football League is something which he has not experienced before and something he can learn from massively".

=== Wycombe Wanderers (loan and permanent transfer) ===
On 28 February 2014, Pierre joined League Two strugglers Wycombe Wanderers on a one-month loan, as cover for the injured Gary Doherty. Allotted the number 19 shirt, he was an unused substitute for a 1–1 draw with Southend United the following day. Despite failing to make an appearance, Pierre stated on 20 March that he was keen on extending the loan. Pierre made his Football League debut and the first senior start of his career when he played the full 90 minutes of a 1–0 defeat to Burton Albion on 25 March. After the match, manager Gareth Ainsworth said Pierre "played really well. He was solid and he's a big lad, he's very fit. He could have had a goal actually, he was inches away from scoring at the other end".

Pierre made his second successive start in a goalless draw with Scunthorpe United on 29 March. Two days later, Pierre's loan was extended until the end of the 2013–14 season. Pierre made his third appearance in a vital 2–0 win over Dagenham & Redbridge on 5 April, lining up against fellow loanee and Brentford teammate Luke Norris. Pierre scored the first league goal of his career with the equaliser in a 1–1 relegation crunch match versus Northampton Town on 18 April. He made eight appearances for the Chairboys, helping the club to survival from League Two after a 3–0 victory on the final day over Torquay United.

Upon returning to Griffin Park, Brentford academy director Ose Aibangee said "Aaron played in games that he will remember for ever. He played a big part in helping Wycombe escape relegation and that will stand him in good stead in the coming years". On 15 May, it was reported that manager Gareth Ainsworth was weighing up a bid for Pierre and the transfer was completed the following day.

=== Northampton Town ===
On 21 July 2017, Pierre signed for League One club Northampton Town on a three-year contract. He won the club's Player of the Season award for the 2018–19 season.

=== Shrewsbury Town ===
On 24 June 2019, it was announced that Pierre had signed for League One side Shrewsbury Town for an undisclosed fee on a three-year deal.

In November 2019, he was charged by the FA with violent conduct after a mêlée in a 4–3 home loss to Bristol Rovers, but later cleared.

On 14 January 2020, Pierre scored an 89th-minute winning goal in a 1–0 home win against Championship side Bristol City in an FA Cup third round replay to set up a fourth round tie with Premier League giants Liverpool. He was named the club's Player of the Year in June.

=== Sutton United ===
On 29 August 2022, Pierre signed for League Two club Sutton United on a free transfer.

=== AFC Wimbledon ===
On 31 January 2023, Pierre joined AFC Wimbledon on a six-month contract. He scored his first goal for Wimbledon on 22 April 2023 against Swindon Town, but was later sent off in the same match.

=== Shrewsbury Town ===
On 14 October 2023, Pierre re-signed for League One side Shrewsbury Town on a contract until January 2024.

In June 2024, he signed a new one-year deal to remain with the club.

On 7 May 2025, Shrewsbury announced the player would be leaving the club in June when his contract expired.

=== Eastleigh ===
On 17 July 2025, Pierre joined National League side Eastleigh.

== International career ==
Pierre qualifies to represent Grenada through his parents, and received his first international call-up in September 2015 for 2018 FIFA World Cup qualifiers against Haiti. He debuted on 4 September in a 3–1 defeat away to that opponent. He scored his first international goal on 8 June 2017, in a 2–2 friendly draw with Bermuda in St Andrew's.

His Shrewsbury teammates Omar Beckles and Ollie Norburn also represented Grenada, forging a link between the club and the Caribbean island.

== Career statistics ==
=== Club ===
As of end of 2024–25 season

Appearances and goals by club, season and competition
Club	Season	League			FA Cup		League Cup		Other		Total	
Club	Season	Division	Apps	Goals	Apps	Goals	Apps	Goals	Apps	Goals	Apps	Goals
Brentford	2012–13	League One	0	0	0	0	0	0	1 (Note: Appearance in Football League Trophy)	0	1	0
Brentford	2013–14	League One	0	0	0	0	1	0	1	0	2	0
Brentford	Total		0	0	0	0	1	0	2	0	3	0
Cambridge United (loan)	2013–14	Conference Premier	0	0	0	0	—		1 (Note: Appearance in FA Trophy)	1	1	1
Wycombe Wanderers (loan)	2013–14	League Two	8	1	—		—		—		8	1
Wycombe Wanderers	2014–15	League Two	42	4	2	1	1	0	4 (Note: One appearance in Football League Trophy, three in League Two play-offs)	0	49	5
Wycombe Wanderers	2015–16	League Two	40	2	4	0	0	0	1	0	45	2
Wycombe Wanderers	2016–17	League Two	39	2	4	0	1	0	3 (Note: Appearance(s) in EFL Trophy)	0	47	2
Wycombe Wanderers	Total		129	9	10	1	2	0	8	0	149	10
Northampton Town	2017–18	League One	19	0	2	0	1	0	1	0	23	0
Northampton Town	2018–19	League Two	41	6	1	0	0	0	3	2	45	8
Northampton Town	Total		60	6	3	0	1	0	4	2	68	8
Shrewsbury Town	2019–20	League One	30	3	6	1	1	0	0	0	37	4
Shrewsbury Town	2020–21	League One	26	4	3	0	0	0	3	0	32	4
Shrewsbury Town	2021–22	League One	25	0	2	0	1	0	2	0	30	0
Sutton United	2022–23	League Two	2	0	0	0	0	0	1	0	3	0
AFC Wimbledon	2022–23	League Two	11	1	—		—		—		11	1
Shrewsbury Town	2023–24	League One	17	1	2	0	—		1	0	20	1
Shrewsbury Town	2024–25	League One	33	3	0	0	1	0	1	0	35	3
Shrewsbury Town	Shrewsbury Town total		131	11	13	1	3	0	7	0	154	12
Career total			333	27	26	2	7	0	23	3	389	32

=== International ===
As of match played 6 June 2023

Appearances and goals by national team and year
National team	Year	Apps	Goals
Grenada	2015	2	0
Grenada	2016	0	0
Grenada	2017	2	1
Grenada	2018	0	0
Grenada	2019	6	0
Grenada	2020	0	0
Grenada	2021	5	0
Grenada	2022	1	0
Grenada	2023	2	0
Total		18	1

Scores and results list Grenada's goal tally first, score column indicates score after each Pierre goal.

List of international goals scored by Aaron Pierre
No.	Date	Venue	Cap	Opponent	Score	Result	Competition	Ref.
1	8 June 2017	Progress Park, Saint Andrew's, Grenada	3	Bermuda	1–1	2–2	Friendly	

== Honours ==
Individual

- PFA Team of the Year: 2015–16 League Two
- Northampton Town Player of the Year: 2018–19
- Shrewsbury Town Player of the Year: 2019–20
