= Leon Clarke =

English footballer (born 1985)

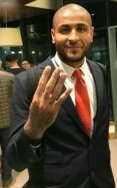
- Clarke in 2017, after scoring all four goals for Sheffield United in a 4–1 win against Hull City

Personal information
- Full name: Leon Marvin Clarke
- Date of birth: 10 February 1985 (age 41)
- Place of birth: Birmingham, England
- Height: 6 ft 2 in (1.88 m)
- Position: Striker

Youth career
- –2003: Wolverhampton Wanderers

Senior career*
Years	Team	Apps	(Gls)
2003–2007	Wolverhampton Wanderers	74	(13)
2004	→ Kidderminster Harriers (loan)	4	(0)
2006	→ Queens Park Rangers (loan)	1	(0)
2006	→ Plymouth Argyle (loan)	5	(0)
2007–2010	Sheffield Wednesday	83	(18)
2007	→ Oldham Athletic (loan)	5	(3)
2007–2008	→ Southend United (loan)	16	(8)
2010–2011	Queens Park Rangers	13	(0)
2011	→ Preston North End (loan)	6	(1)
2011–2012	Swindon Town	2	(0)
2011	→ Chesterfield (loan)	14	(9)
2012–2013	Charlton Athletic	7	(0)
2012	→ Crawley Town^{[A]} (loan)	4	(1)
2012	→ Scunthorpe United (loan)	15	(11)
2013	→ Coventry City (loan)	1	(0)
2013–2014	Coventry City	34	(23)
2014–2015	Wolverhampton Wanderers	29	(3)
2015	→ Wigan Athletic (loan)	10	(1)
2015–2016	Bury	32	(15)
2016–2020	Sheffield United	88	(29)
2019	→ Wigan Athletic (loan)	15	(3)
2020–2021	Shrewsbury Town	10	(1)
2021–2022	Bristol Rovers	11	(2)
2023	Hartlepool United	3	(0)
2023	→ Rushall Olympic (loan)	7	(1)
2023	Kettering Town	6	(0)
2023–2024	Mickleover	8	(1)
Total		503	(143)
- * Club domestic league appearances and goals as of 19:27, 6 May 2024 (UTC)

Leon Marvin Clarke (born 10 February 1985) is an English former professional footballer who played as a striker.

Clarke began his career with Wolverhampton Wanderers but then played for twenty-three clubs – in both permanent and loan deals – over the subsequent years. He played in the Premier League for Sheffield United and as well as spells at Wolves he played at EFL Championship level for Queens Park Rangers, Plymouth Argyle, Sheffield Wednesday, Preston North End and Wigan Athletic. He also played professionally for Kidderminster Harriers, Oldham Athletic, Southend United, Swindon Town, Chesterfield, Charlton Athletic, Coventry City, Crawley Town, Scunthorpe United, Bury, Shrewsbury Town, Bristol Rovers and Hartlepool United. In 2023 he played for non-league side Rushall Olympic.

== Club career ==
=== Wolverhampton Wanderers ===
Having progressed through Wolverhampton Wanderers' youth academy, Clarke made his senior debut for his hometown club in a League Cup win over Darlington on 23 September 2003. Though he did not feature at all in the team's Premier League campaign of that season, he was awarded a two-year contract extension during it.

After a loan period at Kidderminster Harriers in spring 2004, he made his breakthrough into the Wolves first team in the 2004–05 season, making his league debut as a substitute in their opening match at Stoke City and going on to score his first goal in the following game against Preston North End. He ended the campaign with eight goals from 31 appearances.

During the 2005–06 season his fortunes were mixed, as he benefited from injuries to others in the early part of the season, before slipping down the pecking order later in the season, after new players were signed. He angered sections of the Wolves' support after making a "shhh"-ing gesture toward the crowd after he scored a goal against Plymouth Argyle in January 2006. Although his manager, Glenn Hoddle, was not critical of Clarke's gesture, the striker was only selected once more during the remainder of the season and was twice loaned out to other Championship sides; first to Queens Park Rangers, then to Plymouth Argyle, failing to score at either.

Clarke returned to feature regularly for Wolves during the first half of the 2006–07 season and set himself a target of 15 goals for the campaign. However, in the January transfer window he was transfer-listed when manager Mick McCarthy said he wanted to "freshen up" the strike force.

=== Sheffield Wednesday ===
On 15 January 2007, then Sheffield Wednesday manager Brian Laws announced that the Owls had completed the signing of Clarke for an undisclosed fee, thought to be around £300,000 signing a contract until 2009. He was issued with the number 18 shirt, but only made five substitute appearances for the club before it was announced that he was to spend a month on loan at League One promotion-chasing side Oldham Athletic after Clarke requested a loan move to gain playing time. The striker made five appearances for Oldham, netting three times; his first goal coming against League One rivals Doncaster Rovers in a 4–0 victory on 11 March 2007.

After returning to Hillsborough, he was immediately placed in the first team and scored on his first start in a 2–1 victory at Cardiff City. The early stages of the 2007–08 season, saw him only start one game though and he was again loaned out, joining League One Southend United until January on the final day of the 2007 summer transfer window. Having scored on his club debut and set up both other goals in a 3–0 victory against Gillingham, Clarke ended this loan spell with eight goals from 16 appearances. After returning to his parent club he was restricted to one start and five substitute appearances in the rest of the 2007–08 season.

Although the 2008–09 season began with Clarke being told he was now surplus to requirements at Sheffield Wednesday, he remained with the club and achieved his best goal return for them as he ended the campaign with eight goals from 30 appearances. He was rewarded with a contract extension for a further year after his manager praised him making "a fantastic amount of progress" during the year.

The following season saw Clarke score six further goals, including one against Crystal Palace on the final day of the season in a match that could have seen either side relegated from the Championship. However, in celebrating the goal, he kicked the advertising boarding, dislocated his toe and had to be substituted. The game finished 2–2, which saw Wednesday relegated to League One. Three days later it was announced he would not be offered a new contract.

=== Queens Park Rangers ===
Clarke signed for Queens Park Rangers on 21 May 2010 on a two-year contract, with manager Neil Warnock stating that he believed Clarke had "underachieved" but was "worth a gamble". However, he struggled to make any impact, failing to score in fifteen appearances before being loaned to Preston North End in January 2011 until the end of the season. He scored his only goal during his six Preston games on 15 February 2011 against Watford.

=== Swindon Town ===
On 19 August 2011, QPR – now promoted to the Premier League – confirmed that Clarke's contract had been terminated by mutual consent. The same day, he signed for League Two side Swindon Town on a two-year contract.

After a 1–3 loss to Southampton, Clarke was involved in an altercation with Claudio Donatelli, the Swindon fitness coach. After his manager Paolo Di Canio intervened, the manager and player were shown on television cameras arguing and having to be separated by coaching staff. Swindon Town chairman Jeremy Wray subsequently confirmed that the club would be looking to offload Clarke on loan as a result of the incident and Di Canio himself stated that Clarke would never play for Swindon whilst he (Di Canio) remained as manager.

On 8 September, he signed a three-month loan deal at League One club Chesterfield. Manager John Sheridan had been in charge at Oldham when Clarke spent a loan spell there. Following his loan move to Chesterfield, Clarke denied comments by Di Canio that he is "not very professional". He subsequently scored on his home debut, followed by a first professional hat-trick against Carlisle, to end his loan spell with nine goals from 16 appearances.

=== Charlton Athletic ===
On 1 January 2012, Clarke signed for Charlton Athletic as part of a swap deal in exchange for Paul Benson. He made his first appearance for Charlton on 2 January 2012, coming on as a substitute against Brentford in a 2–0 win. However, his time at Charlton was short-lived as Clarke initially struggled; having made only one start. In March 2012, he was loaned out to Crawley Town until the end of the season. Here, he made only three appearances, scoring his only goal for the club on 27 March against Bradford.

In the summer transfer window, Charlton rejected bids for Clarke from both Cheltenham Town and Oldham Athletic. However, he did not return to the Charlton team and instead was again loaned out, this time joining Scunthorpe United in September 2012 on a three-month loan. He expressed doubts regarding his future at Charlton Athletic.

After scoring six times in his first eight games, it was reported that Charlton were keen to use Clarke, once his loan spell ended and therefore Scunthorpe would be unable to sign him on a permanent basis. He ended this loan stay with 11 goals from 15 appearances.

=== Coventry City ===
On Christmas Eve 2012, it was announced that Clarke had been given permission by Charlton to train with League One club Coventry City with a view to a permanent move. On 1 January 2013, having initially been granted a loan move, he made his debut in a 0–1 defeat to Shrewsbury Town. After a first start in a 0–3 defeat at Tottenham Hotspur in the FA Cup, he signed a permanent two-and-a-half-year deal as a free transfer after Charlton had agreed to cancel his contract.

Having scored his first goal for Coventry in a 3–2 victory over Preston North End in the Football League Trophy on 10 January 2013, Clarke ended the 2012–13 season by scoring eight goals in eleven games in the league until an ankle complaint meant he underwent surgery in March, ruling him out for the remainder of the season. At the end of the campaign he was named in the division's PFA Team of the Year.

The 2013–14 season began with Coventry City deducted ten points for failing to agree to a CVA and also having been forced to relocate their home games to Northampton Town's home ground, Sixfields. Nonetheless, Clarke's first fourteen league games saw him score eleven times and form a goalscoring partnership with young striker Callum Wilson, who scored ten in the first twelve games. His form led to him being linked with a number of Football League clubs due to Coventry City's financial plight, including Scunthorpe United, Sheffield United and former club Swindon Town.

The January 2014 transfer window brought renewed interest in Clarke, who had produced the best goal return of his career with 18 goals in half a season, with his former side Wolverhampton Wanderers reportedly bidding for him. Amid this speculation Clarke entered a transfer request and did not feature in a further match after citing a foot injury which provoked an unhappy reaction from his manager Steven Pressley. On 29 January Wolves announced that they had had their bid for Clarke formally accepted by Coventry.

=== Return to Wolverhampton Wanderers ===
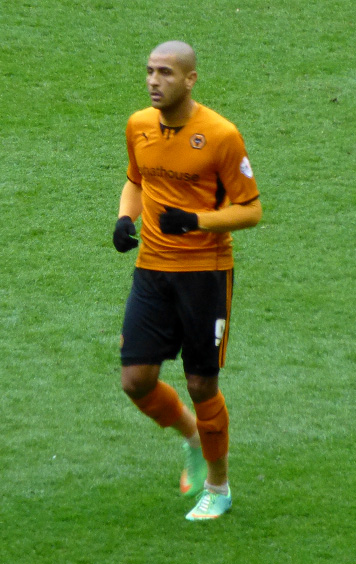
Clarke playing for Wolverhampton Wanderers in 2014

On 30 January 2014 Clarke rejoined his first club Wolverhampton Wanderers, now playing in League One, after signing an eighteen-month deal (with Wolves holding the option of an additional year) for an undisclosed fee reported to be £750,000. Upon signing, Clarke admitted that he had shown "a lot of immaturity" during his first spell at the club and that he believed he was now "a completely different person". He made his second Wolves debut on 1 February in a 2–0 win over Bradford City, with his first goal since rejoining coming on 11 March in a 4–1 victory at Swindon Town. This was his only goal for Wolves though during the remaining games of the season as they won the League One title.

Back at Championship level, Clarke scored twice during 16 league appearances before being loaned out in February 2015 to Wigan Athletic for the remainder of the season. He scored one goal for the Latics but could not prevent them from being relegated to League One. At the conclusion of the season, Wolves announced that they would not be taking up the option of an additional year's contract.

=== Bury ===
On 2 June 2015, Clarke signed for League One club Bury on a three-year deal after his release from Wolverhampton Wanderers. Clarke made his league debut on 8 August in the 1–1 draw with Doncaster Rovers, in a game which saw Bury and Clarke allowed to equalise by walking the ball into the goal after Doncaster winger Harry Forrester had accidentally volleyed the ball into Bury's goal to restart play.

On 11 August, he continued his good form by scoring a brace in a 2–1 win over former team Wigan Athletic in the first round of the League Cup, including the go ahead penalty in the 89th minute.

=== Sheffield United ===
On 27 July 2016, Clarke signed a three-year deal with Sheffield United for an undisclosed fee. He scored his first goal for Sheffield United in a 2–1 EFL Cup loss against Crewe Alexandra on 9 August 2016.

Clarke played against his former club Sheffield Wednesday on 24 September 2017 and scored two goals in a 4–2 win for Sheffield United.

On 4 November 2017, Clarke scored all four goals in a 4–1 win over Hull City, becoming the first Sheffield United player to score four goals in one game since Keith Edwards in 1983. He followed this up with a hat-trick in a defeat against Fulham and a goal against Birmingham City, rounding out the month of November having scored nine goals in four games. He was named Player of the Month for November.

In April, Clarke was named in the PFA Team of the Year, following a career high goalscoring season for Sheffield United.

On 30 January 2019, Clarke was loaned to Wigan Athletic for the second time in his career, until the end of the season.

He was transfer-listed by Sheffield United at the end of the 2018–19 season.

Clarke made his first ever appearance in the Premier League on 28 September 2019, coming on as a substitute in a 1–0 loss against Liverpool, at the age of 34, and 16 years into his professional career.

=== Shrewsbury Town ===
On 25 September 2020, Clarke signed for League One club Shrewsbury Town on a one-year deal. He made his debut for the club the next day, replacing Daniel Udoh in the 70th minute of a 1–1 draw away at Plymouth Argyle. His first start for the club came a week later on 3 October, another 1–1 draw, this time at home to Gillingham. On 17 October, Clarke scored his first goal for the club, heading in a 91st-minute winner from a Josh Vela corner away to AFC Wimbledon at the Kiyan Prince Foundation Stadium.

On 12 May 2021 it was announced that he would leave Shrewsbury at the end of the season, following the expiry of his contract.

=== Bristol Rovers ===
On 31 August 2021, after training with the club throughout the summer, Clarke joined recently relegated League Two club Bristol Rovers on a one-year deal. Clarke made his debut for the club that weekend, coming on as a half-time substitute and within 90 seconds he had scored with his first touch of the ball, the only goal in a victory over Crawley Town. Having been substituted due to injury in what was only his second match and first start for the club, manager Joey Barton revealed on 17 September that Clarke would miss a number of months from a hamstring injury. He finally made his return to first-team action in January 2022, coming off of the bench against former club Swindon Town. He scored his first goal since his return the following match with the third and what proved to be the decisive goal, in a 3–2 win at Scunthorpe United, celebrating his goal by running to the dugout and embracing the medical staff. The season ended with a sixth career promotion for Clarke, a final day 7–0 victory taking Rovers into the final automatic promotion place on goals scored. Clarke was released at the end of the season.

In January 2023, Clarke joined Arbroath on a trial-basis.

=== Hartlepool United ===
On 14 February 2023, Clarke signed for League Two club Hartlepool United on a deal until the end of the season. On 17 March 2023, Clarke signed for Rushall Olympic on loan till the end of the season. At the end of the 2022–23 season, Clarke was released by Hartlepool.

=== Non-League ===
On 29 September 2023, it was announced that Clarke had signed for Southern League Premier Division Central club Kettering Town. He departed the club in November 2023 having been approached by another club.

On 1 December 2023, Clarke joined Mickleover, following his departure from division rivals Kettering Town.

On 16 May 2024, Clarke announced his retirement from professional football in a post on social media.

== Coaching career ==
In November 2024, it was announced that he was working as a coach at the Kidderminster Harriers and Birmingham City academies.

== Career statistics ==
Club statistics
Club	Season	League			FA Cup		League Cup		Other		Total	
Club	Season	Division	Apps	Goals	Apps	Goals	Apps	Goals	Apps	Goals	Apps	Goals
Wolverhampton Wanderers	2003–04	FA Premier League	0	0	1	0	2	0	—		3	0
Wolverhampton Wanderers	2004–05	Championship	28	7	1	0	2	1	—		31	8
Wolverhampton Wanderers	2005–06	Championship	24	1	1	1	1	0	—		26	2
Wolverhampton Wanderers	2006–07	Championship	22	5	0	0	1	0	0	0	23	5
Wolverhampton Wanderers	Total		74	13	3	1	6	1	0	0	83	15
Kidderminster Harriers (loan)	2003–04	Third Division	4	0	0	0	0	0	0	0	4	0
Queens Park Rangers (loan)	2005–06	Championship	1	0	0	0	0	0	—		1	0
Plymouth Argyle (loan)	2005–06	Championship	5	0	0	0	0	0	—		5	0
Sheffield Wednesday	2006–07	Championship	10	1	0	0	0	0	—		10	1
Sheffield Wednesday	2007–08	Championship	8	3	1	0	1	0	—		10	3
Sheffield Wednesday	2008–09	Championship	29	8	0	0	1	0	—		30	8
Sheffield Wednesday	2009–10	Championship	36	6	1	0	0	0	—		37	6
Sheffield Wednesday	Total		83	18	2	0	2	0	—		87	18
Oldham Athletic (loan)	2006–07	League One	5	3	0	0	0	0	0	0	5	3
Southend United (loan)	2007–08	League One	16	8	0	0	0	0	0	0	16	8
Queens Park Rangers	2010–11	Championship	13	0	1	0	1	0	—		15	0
Preston North End (loan)	2010–11	Championship	6	1	0	0	0	0	—		6	1
Swindon Town	2011–12	League Two	2	0	0	0	2	0	0	0	4	0
Chesterfield (loan)	2011–12	League One	14	9	1	0	0	0	1 (Note: Appearance(s) in Football League Trophy)	0	16	9
Charlton Athletic	2011–12	League One	7	0	0	0	0	0	0	0	7	0
Crawley Town (loan)	2011–12^{[A]}	League Two	4	1	0	0	0	0	0	0	4	1
Scunthorpe United (loan)	2012–13	League One	15	11	0	0	0	0	0	0	15	11
Coventry City (loan)	2012–13	League One	1	0	1	0	0	0	0	0	2	0
Coventry City	2012–13	League One	11	8	0	0	0	0	3	2	14	10
Coventry City	2013–14	League One	23	15	4	3	1	0	1	0	29	18
Coventry City	Total		35	23	5	3	1	0	4	2	45	28
Wolverhampton Wanderers	2013–14	League One	13	1	0	0	0	0	0	0	13	1
Wolverhampton Wanderers	2014–15	Championship	16	2	2	0	1	0	—		19	2
Wolverhampton Wanderers	Total		29	3	2	0	1	0	0	0	32	3
Wigan Athletic (loan)	2014–15	Championship	10	1	0	0	0	0	0	0	10	1
Bury	2015–16	League One	32	15	4	1	1	2	0	0	37	18
Sheffield United	2016–17	League One	23	7	1	0	1	1	1 (Note: Appearance in EFL Trophy)	1	26	9
Sheffield United	2017–18	Championship	39	19	0	0	0	0	—		39	19
Sheffield United	2018–19	Championship	24	3	1	0	1	0	—		26	3
Sheffield United	2019–20	Premier League	2	0	2	1	1	0	—		5	1
Sheffield United	Total		88	29	3	1	3	1	1	1	95	32
Wigan Athletic (loan)	2018–19	Championship	15	3	—		—		—		15	3
Shrewsbury Town	2020–21	League One	10	1	0	0	0	0	0	0	10	1
Bristol Rovers	2021–22	League Two	11	2	0	0	0	0	0	0	11	2
Hartlepool United	2022–23	League Two	3	0	0	0	0	0	0	0	3	0
Rushall Olympic (loan)	2022–23	Southern Premier Central	7	1	0	0	—		2 (Note: Appearance(s) in Staffordshire Senior Cup)	0	9	1
Kettering Town	2023–24	Southern Premier Central	6	0	2	0	—		2	0	10	0
Mickleover	2023–24	Southern Premier Central	8	1	0	0	—		2	0	10	1
Career total			503	143	23	6	17	4	12	3	555	156

== Honours ==
Wolverhampton Wanderers

- Football League One: 2013–14

Sheffield United

- EFL Championship second-place promotion: 2018–19
- EFL League One: 2016–17

Bristol Rovers

- EFL League Two third-place promotion: 2021–22

Individual

- PFA Team of the Year: 2012–13 League One, 2017–18 Championship
- Championship Player of the Month: November 2017
- League One Player of the Month: April 2017

== Notes ==
A. Soccerbase's stats for the match between Crawley Town and Port Vale on 17 March 2012 only include 10 players for Crawley Town, with Leon Clarke missing. Therefore, until and unless they correct it, he should have one more appearance for Crawley Town than given on his Soccerbase page.
