= Callum Wilson (footballer, born 2004) =

Professional footballer

Personal information
- Date of birth: 29 February 2004 (age 22)
- Place of birth: Telford, England
- Position: Defender

Team information
- Current team: Rushall Olympic

Youth career
- –2016: AFC Telford United
- 2016–2019: Derby County
- 2019–2021: Shrewsbury Town

Senior career*
Years	Team	Apps	(Gls)
2021–2022	Shrewsbury Town	0	(0)
2022–2024	Sunderland	0	(0)
2024–	Rushall Olympic	2	(0)

International career^{‡}
2022	Northern Ireland U18	1	(0)
- * Club domestic league appearances and goals as of 21:59, 15 January 2025 (UTC) ‡ National team caps and goals as of 21:59, 15 January 2025 (UTC)

Callum Wilson (born 29 February 2004) is a professional footballer who plays as a defender for Southern League Premier Division Central side Rushall Olympic. Born in England, he represents Northern Ireland at youth international level.

== Club career ==
Wilson was born in Telford and began his career playing Saturday league football for AFC Telford United's academy. In 2016, he moved to the youth setup at Derby County at under-13 level. Wilson remained with Derby until under-16 level when he made the move to League One club Shrewsbury Town. Wilson made his senior debut for the club, whilst a first-year scholar, on 5 October 2021, starting in an EFL Trophy match against Wolverhampton Wanderers U21s. On 19 October, Wilson was an unused substitute in a League One match away at Oxford United, which Shrewsbury lost 2–0.

In July 2022, Wilson joined newly-promoted Championship side Sunderland on a two-year deal. Wilson was released at the end of the 2023–24 season without making a senior appearance.

On 13 September 2024, Wilson signed for National League North side Rushall Olympic.

== International career ==
On 17 March 2022, Wilson was called up to the Northern Ireland under-18 team, whom he qualifies for through his father. Wilson made his international debut in a 2-0 loss to Belgium U18.

== Career statistics ==
=== Club ===
As of 6 October 2021

Appearances and goals by club, season and competition
Club	Season	League			National Cup		League Cup		Other		Total	
Club	Season	Division	Apps	Goals	Apps	Goals	Apps	Goals	Apps	Goals	Apps	Goals
Shrewsbury Town	2021–22	League One	0	0	0	0	0	0	2 (Note: Appearances in the EFL Trophy)	0	2	0
Career total			0	0	0	0	0	0	2	0	0	0
