= Matthew Pennington =

English footballer (born 1994)

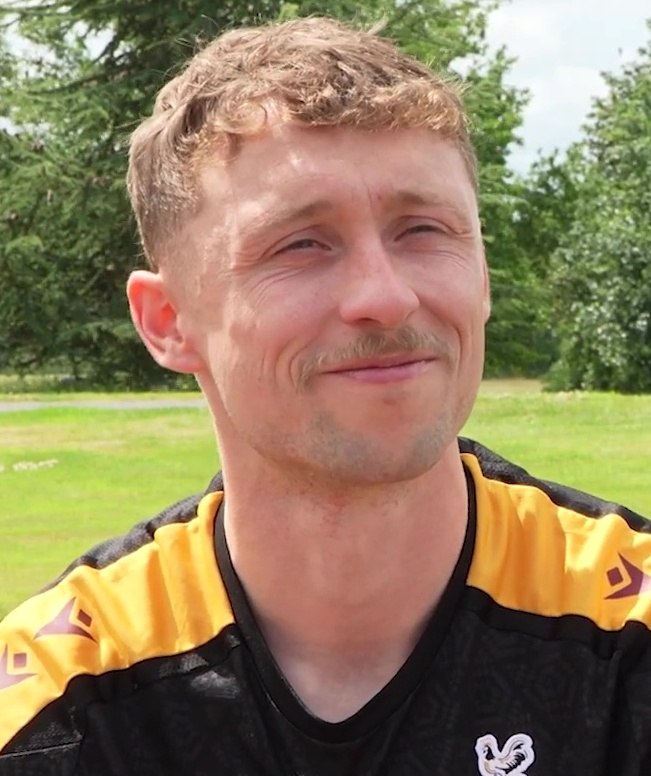
- Pennington in 2025

Personal information
- Full name: Matthew Pennington
- Date of birth: 6 October 1994 (age 32)
- Place of birth: Warrington, England
- Height: 6 ft 1 in (1.85 m)
- Position: Centre-back

Team information
- Current team: Bradford City
- Number: 28

Youth career
- 2005–2013: Everton

Senior career*
Years	Team	Apps	(Gls)
2013–2021	Everton	7	(1)
2014	→ Tranmere Rovers (loan)	17	(2)
2014–2015	→ Coventry City (loan)	24	(0)
2016	→ Walsall (loan)	5	(0)
2017–2018	→ Leeds United (loan)	24	(0)
2018–2019	→ Ipswich Town (loan)	30	(1)
2019–2020	→ Hull City (loan)	14	(0)
2021	→ Shrewsbury Town (loan)	19	(2)
2021–2023	Shrewsbury Town	82	(7)
2023–2025	Blackpool	56	(2)
2025–	Bradford City	36	(2)

International career
2013	England U19	1	(0)
- * Club domestic league appearances and goals as of 11 October 2026 (UTC)

Matthew Pennington (born 6 October 1994) is an English professional footballer who plays as a centre-back for EFL League One club Bradford City.

Pennington previously played for Everton, Shrewsbury Town and Blackpool, with loan spells at Tranmere Rovers, Coventry City, Walsall, Leeds United, Ipswich Town and Hull City.

He has also represented the England national U-19 team at international level.

== Club career ==
=== Everton ===
Pennington joined Everton's youth academy at the age of 11. In July 2013, he signed his first professional contract which would keep him at the club until the summer of 2015, and at that time, he signed a three-year deal tying him with the club to 2018. He played in two friendlies during July 2015, against Dundee and Leeds United, and made his full debut against Barnsley in the League Cup on 26 August 2015.

==== Tranmere Rovers (loan) ====
On 2 January 2014, Pennington joined League One side Tranmere Rovers on a one-month loan deal. He made his debut on 4 January 2014, playing ninety minutes in a 1–1 draw with Wolverhampton Wanderers. On 25 January 2014, he scored his first senior goal in a 1–0 win over Crewe Alexandra. He was recalled by Everton on 22 February 2014 to strengthen their under-21 squad. On 27 March 2014, he re-joined Tranmere on loan until the end of the season.

==== Coventry City (loan) ====
On 27 November 2014, Pennington joined Coventry City on loan until 4 January, and was later extended to 7 February. In January 2015, he was voted as the club's Player of the Month in a poll conducted by the Coventry Telegraph. On 7 February 2015, his loan was extended all the way to the end of the season, with Pennington from then on being played more consistently at his more natural centre-back position. Pennington was named as the Coventry City Young Player of the Year 2014–15, voted for unanimously by Coventry City manager Tony Mowbray and his coaching staff.

==== Walsall (loan) ====
On 23 March 2016, Pennington joined Walsall on loan until the end of the season.

==== Return to Everton ====
On 21 April 2016, having played five games for Walsall, his loan was terminated at the minimum 28-day point due to a defensive crisis at his parent club. Pennington was recalled to be available for Everton's FA Cup semi-final against Manchester United. After picking up a hamstring injury in the final day of the Premier League 2015–16 season on 15 May 2016 in a 3–0 victory against Norwich City, a recurrence of the injury in pre-season required surgery and ruled him out until January 2017.

After returning from injury, his first goal came on 1 April 2017, in the Merseyside derby against Liverpool, levelling the game at 1–1, in an eventual 3–1 loss.

==== Leeds United (loan) ====
On 19 July 2017, Pennington joined Leeds United on a season-long loan, for a reported loan fee of £500,000. On 6 August 2017, Pennington made his Leeds United debut in a 3–2 victory against Bolton Wanderers. He picked up an ankle injury in the match and had to be replaced by fellow debutant Conor Shaughnessy in the second half. He was unavailable until the latter half of September, when he returned to the bench. In October, Pennington returned intermittently to the starting eleven.

After 24 appearances, on 18 May 2018, Leeds announced Pennington would be returning to his parent club upon the expiry of his loan.

==== Return to Everton and departure ====
He returned to Everton to play in the 2018–19 pre-season under their new manager Marco Silva, and on 11 May 2018, Pennington signed a new long-term contract with the club, keeping him there until the end of the 2020–21 season. In May 2021, it was announced that Pennington would be released from the club at the expiration of his contract.

==== Ipswich Town (loan) ====
On 31 August 2018, Pennington joined Ipswich Town on loan until the end of the season. He scored his first goal for the club in a 2–2 draw against Birmingham City on 29 September 2018; he was sent off in the match.

==== Hull City (loan) ====
On 8 August 2019, Pennington joined Hull City on loan for the 2019–20 season. He made his first appearance for the club in the first round of the EFL Cup in a 3–0 win at Tranmere Rovers.

=== Shrewsbury Town ===
On 31 December 2020, Pennington joined League One side Shrewsbury Town on loan until the end of the 2020–21 season. He made his debut for the club on 19 January 2021 in a 2–0 FA Cup defeat to Southampton, but dislocated his shoulder in training shortly after making his league debut in a 1–0 defeat to Sunderland on 23 January. He returned from injury on 27 February for a match against Bristol Rovers "miles ahead of schedule" to fill in for the injured Donald Love, and held a regular place in the Shrewsbury defence following his return from injury. On 24 April, he scored his first goal for the club with a header from a Harry Chapman corner in a 1–0 win at Blackpool, and he scored his second goal two games later in a 3–2 home defeat to Oxford United, again with a header from a Chapman corner. He made 20 appearances in total during his loan at the club.

On 27 May 2021, Pennington signed for Shrewsbury Town on a permanent deal following his departure from Everton.

=== Blackpool ===
On 1 July 2023, after rejecting the offer of a new contract with Shrewsbury, Pennington agreed to join League One side Blackpool.

=== Bradford City ===
On 25 June 2025, Pennington joined newly promoted League One side Bradford City on a two-year deal following the expiry of his contract with Blackpool. He scored his first goal for the club on 24 February 2026, the only goal in a 1–0 home win against Rotherham United.

== International career ==
Pennington made his debut for England U19s on 21 March 2013, coming on as a 70th-minute substitute in a 1–0 win over Turkey.

== Career statistics ==
As of match played 15 August 2026

Appearances and goals by club, season and competition
Club	Season	League			FA Cup		League Cup		Other		Total	
Club	Season	Division	Apps	Goals	Apps	Goals	Apps	Goals	Apps	Goals	Apps	Goals
Everton	2013–14	Premier League	0	0	0	0	0	0	—		0	0
Everton	2014–15	Premier League	0	0	0	0	0	0	0	0	0	0
Everton	2015–16	Premier League	4	0	1	0	1	0	—		6	0
Everton	2016–17	Premier League	3	1	0	0	0	0	—		3	1
Everton	2017–18	Premier League	0	0	0	0	0	0	0	0	0	0
Everton	2018–19	Premier League	0	0	0	0	0	0	—		0	0
Everton	2019–20	Premier League	0	0	0	0	0	0	—		0	0
Everton	2020–21	Premier League	0	0	0	0	0	0	—		0	0
Everton	Total		7	1	1	0	1	0	0	0	9	1
Tranmere Rovers (loan)	2013–14	League One	17	2	0	0	0	0	0	0	17	2
Coventry City (loan)	2014–15	League One	24	0	0	0	0	0	1 (Note: Appearance in Football League Trophy)	0	25	0
Walsall (loan)	2015–16	League One	5	0	0	0	0	0	0	0	5	0
Leeds United (loan)	2017–18	Championship	24	0	0	0	0	0	—		24	0
Ipswich Town (loan)	2018–19	Championship	30	1	1	0	0	0	—		31	1
Hull City (loan)	2019–20	Championship	14	0	0	0	2	0	—		16	0
Shrewsbury Town (loan)	2020–21	League One	19	2	1	0	0	0	0	0	20	2
Shrewsbury Town	2021–22	League One	45	3	2	0	2	0	2 (Note: Appearances in EFL Trophy)	0	51	3
Shrewsbury Town	2022–23	League One	37	4	3	2	2	0	0	0	42	6
Shrewsbury Town	Total		101	9	6	2	4	0	2	0	113	11
Blackpool	2023–24	League One	35	2	0	0	1	0	2	0	38	2
Blackpool	2024–25	League One	21	0	2	0	3	2	3	0	29	2
Blackpool	Total		56	2	2	0	4	2	5	0	67	4
Bradford City	2025–26	League One	28	2	1	0	2	0	0	0	31	2
Bradford City	2026–27	League One	1	0	0	0	1	0	0	0	2	0
Bradford City	Total		29	2	1	0	3	0	0	0	33	2
Career total			307	17	11	2	14	2	8	0	340	21
