= Josh Daniels =

Irish footballer (born 1996)

Personal information
- Full name: Joshua Christopher Daniels
- Birth name: Joshua Christopher Tracey
- Date of birth: 22 February 1996 (age 30)
- Place of birth: Derry, Northern Ireland
- Height: 5 ft 9 in (1.75 m)
- Positions: Winger; wing-back; full back

Team information
- Current team: Glentoran
- Number: 57

Youth career
- Derry City

Senior career*
Years	Team	Apps	(Gls)
2014–2017	Derry City	57	(2)
2017–2020	Glenavon	87	(13)
2020–2022	Shrewsbury Town	40	(2)
2022–2026	The New Saints	73	(8)
2026–	Glentoran	14	(1)

International career
- Northern Ireland U17
- Northern Ireland U19
- Republic of Ireland U21
- * Club domestic league appearances and goals as of 29 April 2026

Joshua Christopher Daniels (born Joshua Christopher Tracey on 22 February 1996) is an Irish professional footballer who is a winger/wing-back playing for NIFL Premiership side Glentoran

== Club career ==
Born in Derry, began his career with Derry City. He scored his first goal for the club in May 2016, less than two months after five members of his family had died in a car accident. In August 2017 he moved to Glenavon, signing a contract extension with the club in January 2019, lasting until 2021.

In July 2020 he was linked with a move away from Glenavon, with Glentoran and Linfield reportedly interested. In August 2020 he signed for English club Shrewsbury Town. He made his competitive debut for Shrewsbury as a substitute in a 4–3 defeat to Middlesbrough in the EFL Cup on 4 September 2020.

In June 2022 he joined The New Saints.

In the January 2026 transfer window he signed for Belfast club Glentoran.

== International career ==
Daniels played for Northern Ireland at under-17 and under-19. He then switched allegiance to the Republic of Ireland, playing for their under-21 team.

== Personal life ==
In March 2016, five members of Daniels' family died in the Buncrana Pier tragedy when a car plunged into Lough Swilly in County Donegal, Ireland.

== Career statistics ==
As of match played 30 April 2022

Appearances and goals by club, season and competition
Club	Season	League			National Cup		League Cup		Europe		Other		Total	
Club	Season	Division	Apps	Goals	Apps	Goals	Apps	Goals	Apps	Goals	Apps	Goals	Apps	Goals
Derry City	2013	LOI Premier Division	0	0	0	0	0	0	0	0	–		0	0
Derry City	2014	LOI Premier Division	10	0	2	0	1	0	1 (Note: Appearance in Europa League)	0	–		14	0
Derry City	2015	LOI Premier Division	9	0	2	0	0	0	–		–		11	0
Derry City	2016	LOI Premier Division	20	2	4	1	3	0	–		–		27	3
Derry City	2017	LOI Premier Division	18	0	0	0	1	0	1	0	–		20	0
Derry City	Total		57	2	8	1	5	0	2	0	0	0	72	3
Glenavon	2017–18	NIFL Premiership	29	2	1	0	2	0	–		0	0	32	2
Glenavon	2018–19	NIFL Premiership	33	7	2	0	1	0	1	1	1 (Note: Appearance in NIFL Premiership European Playoffs)	0	38	8
Glenavon	2019–20	NIFL Premiership	24	4	1	0	1	0	–		2 (Note: One appearance and one goal in Scottish Challenge Cup; one appearance and one goal in Mid-Ulster Cup)	2	38	8
Glenavon	Total		86	13	4	0	4	0	1	1	3	2	98	16
Shrewsbury Town	2020–21	League One	19	2	1	0	1	0	–		4 (Note: Appearance(s) in EFL Trophy)	0	25	2
Shrewsbury Town	2021–22	League One	21	0	2	0	2	0	–		1	0	26	0
Shrewsbury Town	Total		40	2	3	0	2	0	–		5	0	51	2
Career total			183	17	15	1	11	0	3	1	9	2	221	21
