= Daniel Udoh =

Nigerian footballer (born 1996)

Personal information
- Full name: Daniel Dominic Udoh
- Date of birth: 30 August 1996 (age 30)
- Place of birth: Lagos, Nigeria
- Height: 1.83 m (6 ft 0 in)
- Position: Forward

Team information
- Current team: Salford City
- Number: 23

Youth career
- Luton Town
- –2014: Stevenage

Senior career*
Years	Team	Apps	(Gls)
2014–2015	Kidderminster Harriers	0	(0)
2014	→ Worcester City (loan)	9	(0)
2014	→ Wingate & Finchley (loan)		
2014–2015	→ North Greenford United (loan)	1	(0)
2015	→ Grays Athletic (loan)	1	(0)
2015	→ Hoddesdon Town (loan)	11	(7)
2015–2016	Ilkeston	34	(8)
2016–2018	Crewe Alexandra	15	(0)
2017	→ Solihull Moors (loan)	4	(0)
2017	→ Halesowen Town (loan)	16	(7)
2017–2018	→ Chester (loan)	3	(0)
2018	→ Leamington (loan)	17	(5)
2018–2019	AFC Telford United	39	(19)
2019–2024	Shrewsbury Town	155	(31)
2024–2025	Wycombe Wanderers	47	(9)
2025–	Salford City	48	(10)

International career
- Nigeria U17
- * Club domestic league appearances and goals as of 17:03, 31 October 2026 (UTC)

Dominic Daniel Udoh (born 30 August 1996) is a Nigerian professional footballer who plays as a forward for EFL League Two club Salford City.

== Career ==
=== Early career ===
Udoh was born in Lagos, Nigeria, then came to England with his family at the age of nine, and as a teenager joined the Luton Town development squad. He later moved on to the Stevenage Academy on a two-year scholarship. He was called up to the Nigeria under-17 squad, however Stevenage were concerned that he spent too much time on international duty and released him.

He signed on non-contract terms alongside former teammate Harold Joseph with Kidderminster Harriers. Kidderminster loaned him out to Worcester City, Wingate & Finchley, North Greenford United and Grays Athletic, but he became frustrated by a lack of match time, and ended the season at Hoddesdon Town. He was invited to a trial at Ilkeston by manager Gavin Strachan, and impressed in pre-season enough to earn a one-year contract in 2015. He remained a first team regular after Andy Watson replaced Strachan as manager in October, forming a successful partnership with Lee Ndlovu.

=== Crewe Alexandra ===
Udoh was signed for an undisclosed fee by League One side Crewe Alexandra on 21 March 2016 after being spotted by head of recruitment Neil Baker. He made his first team debut seven days later, in a 1–0 defeat to Bradford City at Gresty Road, coming on as a 70th-minute substitute for Lauri Dalla Valle, and started the next game, at Port Vale, on 9 April 2016. He scored his first senior goal on his 20th birthday in a 3–0 win at Accrington Stanley in a Football League Trophy tie on 30 August 2016.

In early 2017, Udoh spent a loan period at Solihull Moors. On 1 September 2017, Udoh signed for Northern Premier League team Halesowen Town on a two-month loan deal (along with teammate Oliver Finney). The loan was extended by a further month in early November. He subsequently went on loan to Chester and to Leamington. Having played no first-team games for Crewe in the previous season, on 9 May 2018, Crewe manager David Artell announced Udoh would not be offered a new contract at the club.

=== AFC Telford United ===
In June 2018, Udoh signed for AFC Telford United of the National League North. He was a prolific goal scorer during his season with Telford, scoring 26 times.

=== Shrewsbury Town ===
On 31 May 2019, it was announced that Udoh had signed for local rivals Shrewsbury Town on a two-year deal for an undisclosed fee. He made his league debut for the club on 20 August, coming on as a 79th-minute substitute and scoring an 89th-minute winner in a 2–3 away win at Accrington Stanley.

He scored the opening goal against Liverpool FC at Anfield in a 2021–22 FA Cup 3rd-round game on 9 January 2022, but Shrewsbury went on to lose 4–1. Udoh finished the 2021–22 season as Shrewsbury's leading goalscorer with 16 goals in all competitions but played only seven games the following season after injuring his anterior cruciate ligament in August 2022.

Following the conclusion of the 2023–24 season, Udoh was offered a new contract.

=== Wycombe Wanderers ===
On 3 July 2024, Udoh joined Wycombe Wanderers having rejected the offer of a new contract with Shrewsbury Town.

=== Salford City ===
On 1 September 2025, Udoh joined League Two side Salford City on a two-year contract. He made his debut for the club on 6 September 2025, in a 3–1 win against Tranmere Rovers. He scored his first goals for the club on 13 September 2025, netting twice in a 3–1 win against his former club Shrewsbury Town.

== Personal life ==
Udoh is a Christian.

== Career statistics ==
As of match played 31 October 2026

Appearances and goals by club, season and competition
Club	Season	League			FA Cup		League Cup		Other		Total	
Club	Season	Division	Apps	Goals	Apps	Goals	Apps	Goals	Apps	Goals	Apps	Goals
Worcester City	2014–15	Conference North	9	0	0	0	—		0	0	9	0
North Greenford United	2014–15	Southern League Division One Central	1	0	—		—		0	0	1	0
Grays Athletic	2014–15	Isthmian League Premier Division	1	0	—		—		0	0	1	0
Hoddesdon Town	2014–15	Spartan South Midlands League Premier Division	11	7	—		—		—		11	7
Ilkeston	2015–16	Northern Premier League Premier Division	34	8	—		—		—		34	8
Crewe Alexandra	2015–16	League One	6	0	0	0	0	0	0	0	6	0
Crewe Alexandra	2016–17	League Two	9	0	2	0	0	0	3 (Note: Appearances in EFL Trophy)	1	14	1
Crewe Alexandra	2017–18	League Two	0	0	0	0	0	0	0	0	0	0
Crewe Alexandra	Total		15	0	2	0	0	0	3	1	20	1
Solihull Moors (loan)	2016–17	National League	4	0	—		—		—		4	0
Halesowen Town (loan)	2017–18	Northern Premier League	16	7	—		—		—		16	7
Chester (loan)	2017–18	National League	3	0	—		—		—		3	0
Leamington (loan)	2017–18	National League North	17	5	—		—		—		17	5
AFC Telford United	2018–19	National League North	39	19	—		—		—		39	19
Shrewsbury Town	2019–20	League One	25	4	5	0	0	0	3	0	33	4
Shrewsbury Town	2020–21	League One	39	4	3	1	1	0	1	0	44	5
Shrewsbury Town	2021–22	League One	46	13	3	1	2	2	0	0	51	16
Shrewsbury Town	2022–23	League One	5	0	0	0	2	1	0	0	7	1
Shrewsbury Town	2023–24	League One	40	10	2	1	1	0	3	1	46	12
Shrewsbury Town	Total		155	31	13	3	6	3	7	1	181	38
Wycombe Wanderers	2024–25	League One	41	8	3	0	2	1	5 (Note: Three appearances in EFL Trophy, two appearances in EFL League One play-offs)	0	51	9
Wycombe Wanderers	2025–26	League One	6	1	0	0	0	0	0	0	6	1
Wycombe Wanderers	Total		47	9	3	0	2	1	5	0	57	10
Salford City	2025–26	League Two	35	9	4	0	0	0	3 (Note: Appearances in EFL League Two play-offs)	1	42	10
Salford City	2026–27	League Two	13	1	0	0	1	0	2	1	16	2
Salford City	Total		48	10	4	0	1	0	5	2	58	12
Career total			400	96	22	3	10	4	20	4	452	107
