= Josh Vela =

English footballer (born 1993)

Personal information
- Full name: Joshua James Vela
- Date of birth: 14 December 1993 (age 32)
- Place of birth: Salford, England
- Height: 5 ft 11 in (1.81 m)
- Positions: Midfielder; defender

Team information
- Current team: Warrington Town

Youth career
- 2002–2011: Bolton Wanderers

Senior career*
Years	Team	Apps	(Gls)
2011–2019	Bolton Wanderers	160	(12)
2014	→ Notts County (loan)	7	(0)
2019–2020	Hibernian	9	(0)
2020–2022	Shrewsbury Town	84	(5)
2022–2024	Fleetwood Town	67	(2)
2024–2025	Carlisle United	33	(2)
2025–	Warrington Town	8	(0)
- * Club domestic league appearances and goals as of 10:05, 3 November 2025 (UTC)

Joshua James Vela (born 14 December 1993) is a former English professional footballer who plays as a central midfielder for Warrington Town.

Vela started his career with Bolton Wanderers, and made 182 total appearances for the club, during which time he also played on loan for Notts County. He sometimes played as a right-back during his early seasons with Bolton, before he transitioned into midfield.

He then spent the first half of the 2019–20 season at Hibernian, before signing for Shrewsbury Town. In his later career, Vela also played for Fleetwood Town and Carlisle United.

== Early life ==
Vela was born in Salford, Greater Manchester and attended Hope High School.

== Career ==
=== Bolton Wanderers ===
A product of the Bolton Wanderers Academy since joining the academy at nine, Vela signed a professional contract with the club in March 2011. At age seventeen, he was linked to Liverpool and Bolton rejected £1 million offer from Liverpool.

Throughout the 2011–12 season, Vela was a mainstay of the reserve team, although he spent three months on the sidelines after fracturing his foot in a reserve match with Blackburn Rovers in November 2011. After returning to fitness, he was rewarded with a new three-and-a-half-year contract in February 2012. Vela was then given number twenty-five shirt at the club.

He made his debut for the club in the 1–1 home draw against Swansea City on 21 April 2012, coming on for Mark Davies in the 90th minute. His first start for Bolton came on 28 August in the League Cup second round against Crawley Town but this full debut didn't last long, as he was taken off after seven minutes and replaced by Darren Pratley because of an injury caused by a foul from Nicky Adams. This injury would sideline Vela for four months. On his return, Vela started in Bolton's 2–0 victory at Sunderland in an FA Cup third round replay on 15 January 2013, and he made his first league start for the club at Watford on 2 February. After those matches, Vela expressed his delight on returning to action from injury.

On 21 March 2014, Vela joined League One club Notts County on an initial 28-day loan. He made his Notts County debut the next day, starting in central midfield, in a 4–1 win over Carlisle United. After making five appearances for Notts County, Vela extended his loan spell with the club until the end of the season. While at Notts County, Vela stated that time at the club could give him a chance of having first team football at Bolton.

Making two further appearances, Vela's loan spell with Notts County came to an end and he returned to his parent club. Upon leaving, manager Shaun Derry paid tribute to him, saying that he had "been at the centre of all our good results and he's done very well."

In the 2014–15 season, Vela was initially to be sent out on loan by Dougie Freedman, but this didn't happen, as Freedman was sacked by the club. Under new manager Neil Lennon, Vela was playing at right back ahead of the more experienced Kevin McNaughton and fellow youth graduate Oscar Threlkeld. For his good displays, Vela was among the players to be offered new contracts by Lennon, as his contract was due to expire at the end of the 2014–15 season. He made twenty-nine appearances for the club this season, but impressive displays at right-back and in his return to a midfield position, led The Bolton News to call for Vela to be voted the club's player of the year, while Lennon said he should be proud of his displays during the season. At the award ceremony, Vela finished second with 19 per cent for Bolton Wanderers' Player of the Season, just behind Tim Ream.

Vela scored his first goal for Bolton in a 2–2 draw with Charlton Athletic on 15 December 2015.

At the end of the 2018–19 season, Vela confirmed that he would be leaving the club after seventeen years. He left because his relationship with manager Phil Parkinson became irreparable as Vela refused to be on the bench and was annoyed that loan players were playing instead of him.

=== Hibernian ===
Vela signed a three-year contract with Scottish Premiership club Hibernian in July 2019. He played 14 total games for the Edinburgh club, scoring once on 17 August in the second round of the Scottish League Cup in a 5–3 home win over Greenock Morton.

=== Shrewsbury Town ===
On 20 January 2020, Vela came back to England, signing for League One side Shrewsbury Town on a two-and-a-half-year deal. He was assigned the number 20 shirt. He won both the fan's and player's Player of the Year awards for the 2020–21 season. Vela agreed to a new contract of undisclosed length with the club at the end of the 2021–22 season. It was later revealed however, that despite having agreed terms with the club, Vela would indeed be departing the club upon the expiration of his contract.

=== Fleetwood Town ===
On 8 June 2022, Vela was announced to be joining fellow League One club Fleetwood Town on a three-year contract upon the expiration of his Shrewsbury Town contract. Shortly after signing, he became Fleetwood captain.

=== Carlisle United ===
On 25 January 2024, Vela signed for fellow League One club Carlisle United for an undisclosed fee. His debut came a week later, as a substitute, against his former team Bolton Wanderers in a 4–1 loss.

On 16 May 2025, Carlisle announced he would be leaving in June when his contract expired.

=== Warrington Town ===
In August 2025 he signed for Warrington Town ahead of an FA Cup tie.

== Career statistics ==
As of match played 20 January 2024

Appearances and goals by club, season and competition
Club	Season	League			National Cup (Note: Includes FA Cup)		League Cup (Note: Includes League/EFL Cup, Scottish League Cup)		Other		Total	
Club	Season	Division	Apps	Goals	Apps	Goals	Apps	Goals	Apps	Goals	Apps	Goals
Bolton Wanderers	2010–11	Premier League	0	0	0	0	0	0	—		0	0
Bolton Wanderers	2011–12	Premier League	3	0	0	0	0	0	—		3	0
Bolton Wanderers	2012–13	Championship	4	0	2	0	1	0	—		7	0
Bolton Wanderers	2013–14	Championship	0	0	1	0	1	0	—		2	0
Bolton Wanderers	2014–15	Championship	29	0	3	0	0	0	—		32	0
Bolton Wanderers	2015–16	Championship	31	2	3	0	1	0	—		35	2
Bolton Wanderers	2016–17	League One	46	9	3	1	1	0	3 (Note: Appearance(s) in the EFL Trophy.)	0	53	10
Bolton Wanderers	2017–18	Championship	30	1	1	0	0	0	—		31	1
Bolton Wanderers	2018–19	Championship	17	0	1	0	1	0	—		19	0
Bolton Wanderers	Total		160	12	14	1	5	0	3	0	182	13
Notts County (loan)	2013–14	League One	7	0	0	0	0	0	0	0	7	0
Hibernian	2019–20	Scottish Premiership	9	0	0	0	5	1	—		14	1
Shrewsbury Town	2019–20	League One	4	0	0	0	—		—		4	0
Shrewsbury Town	2020–21	League One	44	3	2	0	0	0	3	0	49	3
Shrewsbury Town	2021–22	League One	36	2	2	0	2	0	1	0	41	2
Shrewsbury Town	Total		84	5	4	0	2	0	4	0	94	5
Fleetwood Town	2022–23	League One	44	1	5	0	2	0	2	0	53	1
Fleetwood Town	2023–24	League One	23	1	2	0	1	0	2	0	27	1
Fleetwood Town	Total		67	2	7	0	3	0	4	0	80	2
Carlisle United	2023–24	League One	5	2	—		—		—		5	2
Carlisle United	2024–25	League Two	28	0	0	0	1	0	1	0	30	0
Career total			358	20	25	1	16	1	12	0	410	22

== Honours ==
Bolton Wanderers

- EFL League One runner-up: 2016–17

Individual

- Shrewsbury Town Player of the Season: 2020–21
