= Elliott Bennett =

English footballer (born 1988)

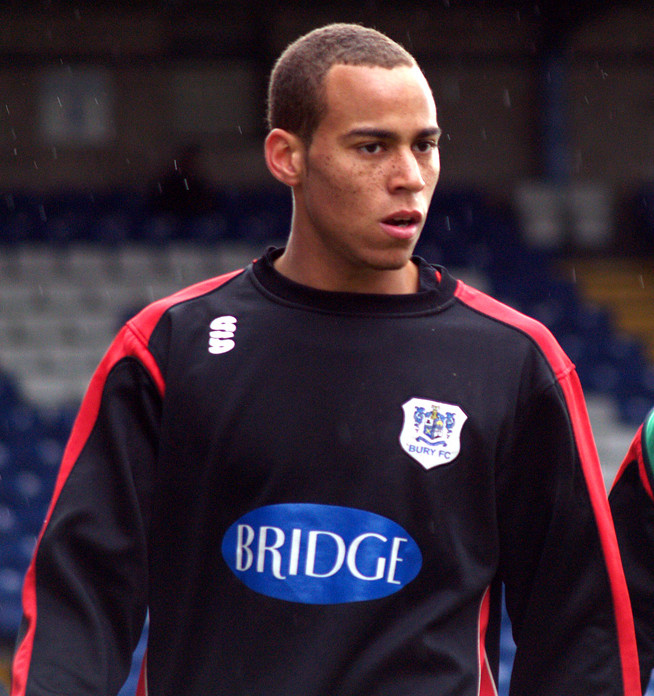
- Bennett warming up for Bury in 2009

Personal information
- Full name: Elliott Bennett
- Date of birth: 18 December 1988 (age 37)
- Place of birth: Shrewsbury, England
- Height: 5 ft 9 in (1.75 m)
- Positions: Winger; right-back

Team information
- Current team: Shifnal Town (manager)

Youth career
- 2004–2007: Wolverhampton Wanderers

Senior career*
Years	Team	Apps	(Gls)
2007–2009	Wolverhampton Wanderers	0	(0)
2007–2008	→ Crewe Alexandra (loan)	9	(1)
2008	→ Bury (loan)	19	(1)
2008–2009	→ Bury (loan)	46	(3)
2009–2011	Brighton & Hove Albion	89	(13)
2011–2016	Norwich City	68	(2)
2014	→ Brighton & Hove Albion (loan)	7	(0)
2015	→ Bristol City (loan)	15	(0)
2016–2021	Blackburn Rovers	177	(8)
2021–2024	Shrewsbury Town	107	(2)
2024–2026	Shifnal Town	10	(1)

Managerial career
- 2026–: Shifnal Town
- * Club domestic league appearances and goals as of 13:29, 26 September 2024 (UTC)

Elliott Bennett (born 18 December 1988) is an English professional footballer who played as a defender. He is currently manager of Northern Premier League Division One West club Shifnal Town. He is the elder brother of footballer Kyle Bennett.

== Club career ==
=== Wolverhampton Wanderers ===
Bennett grew up in Telford, Shropshire, and joined Wolverhampton Wanderers at age nine having been spotted playing in a local five-a-side tournament. He captained the club's under-12 team that travelled to Japan in 2001 and won the U12 World Cup, where he also picked up the Player of the Tournament award. He attended Thomas Telford School, where he captained the football team to win the County Cup five years in a row. Bennett was also a talented 200m sprinter and represented Shropshire at the English School Athletics Championships.

He left school to gain a scholarship at Wolves alongside Lee Collins, and signed professional forms with them in March 2007. The midfielder never made a league appearance for Wolves though, despite being picked for the first team squad several times, but did appear twice for them in the League Cup.

=== Brighton & Hove Albion ===
After spending time at loan at both Crewe (where he scored once against Port Vale) and Bury, Bennett signed a three-year contract with Brighton & Hove Albion on 20 August 2009. In November 2010 he signed a new three-and-a-half-year contract to keep him at Brighton & Hove Albion until the summer of 2014. Bennett enjoyed a successful season in 2010–11, playing a significant role in Brighton's promotion to the Championship. Scoring eight goals, Bennett gained a place in the PFA League One Team of the Year.

=== Norwich City ===
==== 2011–12 season ====
On 14 June 2011, he signed for Norwich City on an undisclosed three-year deal. He was handed squad number 17 for the upcoming Premier League season. Bennett scored the third goal in a 3–0 pre-season win against Coventry City from 30 yards out. However, this was not enough to earn Bennett a starting place against Wigan Athletic on the opening day of the Premier League season where he came on as a sub, replacing Andrew Surman. On 9 April 2012, Bennett scored his first Premier League goal against Tottenham Hotspur at White Hart Lane with a strike from just outside the penalty area, which proved to be the winner in a 2–1 victory for the Canaries.

==== 2012–13 season ====
Bennett started the 2012–13 season on the bench at Craven Cottage in the Canaries' 0–5 defeat. He picked up an injury coming on for Robert Snodgrass. Bennett then made his return in a League Cup clash against Doncaster Rovers which featured his younger brother Kyle Bennett. On 6 April he got two assists in a 2–2 draw against Swansea City. On 20 April, he scored in a 2–1 win against Reading.

==== 2013–14 season ====
Having played in Norwich's opening Premier League fixture against Everton, Bennett injured his knee ligaments, requiring surgery, ruling him out until 2014. He made his return from injury on the final day of the season, replacing Nathan Redmond in the 76th minute of a 2–0 defeat to Arsenal.

=== Blackburn Rovers ===
On 5 January 2016, Bennett signed for Blackburn Rovers on a 2 1/2-year deal. Bennett scored his first Rovers goal on 27 February in a 3–2 victory over Milton Keynes Dons.

On 5 October 2017, Rovers announced that Bennett had signed a new two-year contract.

On 16 November 2018, Rovers announced that Bennett had signed a new two-and-a-half-year contract.

After the departure of Charlie Mulgrew to Wigan on a season-long loan, Blackburn Rovers manager Tony Mowbray announced Elliot Bennett would take over as club captain for the 2019–20 season.

=== Shrewsbury Town ===
On 17 June 2021, Bennett made the step down to League One, signing for Shrewsbury Town on a one-year deal. Bennett signed a contract extension of undisclosed length at the end of the 2021–22 season. He was released by the club at the end of the 2022–23 season, but remained with the club for the 2023–24 season. He was released by Shrewsbury at the end of the 2023–24 season.

== International career ==
Bennett qualifies to play for Jamaica through his paternal grandparents. He was called up to the Jamaica national team on 27 February 2015 for friendly games against Venezuela and Cuba.

== Managerial Career ==
In October 2026, Bennett was appointed manager of Shifnal Town.

== Career statistics ==
As of match played 15 August 2023

Appearances and goals by club, season and competition
Club	Season	League			FA Cup		League Cup		Other		Total	
Club	Season	Division	Apps	Goals	Apps	Goals	Apps	Goals	Apps	Goals	Apps	Goals
Wolverhampton Wanderers	2007–08	Championship	0	0	0	0	2	0	–		2	0
Wolverhampton Wanderers	2008–09	Championship	0	0	0	0	0	0	–		0	0
Wolverhampton Wanderers	Total		0	0	0	0	2	0	0	0	2	0
Crewe Alexandra (loan)	2007–08	League One	9	1	2	0	0	0	0	0	11	1
Bury (loan)	2007–08	League Two	19	1	0	0	0	0	0	0	19	1
Bury (loan)	2008–09	League Two	46	3	1	0	1	0	4 (Note: Two appearances in Football League Trophy; two appearances in League Two play-offs)	0	52	3
Bury (loan)	Total		65	4	1	0	1	0	4	0	71	4
Brighton & Hove Albion	2009–10	League One	43	7	4	2	0	0	0	0	47	9
Brighton & Hove Albion	2010–11	League One	46	6	5	2	1	0	1 (Note: Appearance in Football League Trophy)	0	53	8
Brighton & Hove Albion	Total		89	13	9	4	1	0	1	0	100	17
Norwich City	2011–12	Premier League	33	1	3	0	0	0	–		36	1
Norwich City	2012–13	Premier League	24	1	2	1	2	0	–		28	2
Norwich City	2013–14	Premier League	2	0	0	0	0	0	–		2	0
Norwich City	2014–15	Championship	9	0	0	0	2	0	1 (Note: Appearance in Championship play-offs)	0	12	0
Norwich City	2015–16	Premier League	0	0	0	0	2	0	–		2	0
Norwich City	Total		68	2	5	1	6	0	1	0	80	3
Brighton & Hove Albion (loan)	2014–15	Championship	7	0	0	0	0	0	–		7	0
Bristol City (loan)	2015–16	Championship	15	0	0	0	0	0	–		15	0
Blackburn Rovers	2015–16	Championship	21	2	3	0	0	0	–		24	2
Blackburn Rovers	2016–17	Championship	25	3	2	1	1	0	–		28	4
Blackburn Rovers	2017–18	League One	41	2	3	0	2	0	1 (Note: Appearance(s) in EFL Trophy)	0	47	2
Blackburn Rovers	2018–19	Championship	40	1	2	0	0	0	–		42	1
Blackburn Rovers	2019–20	Championship	41	0	1	0	0	0	–		42	0
Blackburn Rovers	2020–21	Championship	9	0	0	0	0	0	–		9	0
Blackburn Rovers	Total		177	8	11	1	3	0	1	0	192	9
Blackburn Rovers U23	2016–17	—	—		—		—		2	0	2	0
Shrewsbury Town	2021–22	League One	42	1	3	1	2	0	1	0	48	2
Shrewsbury Town	2022–23	League One	32	1	2	0	0	0	1	0	35	1
Shrewsbury Town	2023–24	League One	33	0	3	0	0	0	0	0	35	0
Shrewsbury Town	Total		107	2	8	1	2	0	2	0	85	3
Career total			506	30	33	7	15	0	11	0	600	37

== Honours ==
Brighton & Hove Albion

- Football League One: 2010–11

Norwich City

- Football League Championship play-offs: 2015

Blackburn Rovers

- EFL League One runner-up: 2017–18

Individual

- PFA Team of the Year: 2010–11 League One
