= 2015–16 Peterborough United F.C. season =

Peterborough United
2015–16 season
- Chairman: Darragh MacAnthony
- Manager: Dave Robertson (until 6 September 2015); Graham Westley (21 September 2015 – 23 April 2016)
- Stadium: London Road
- League One: 13th
- FA Cup: Fourth round (eliminated by West Bromwich Albion)
- League Cup: Second round (eliminated by Charlton Athletic)
- FL Trophy: First round (eliminated by Millwall)
- Top goalscorer: League: Conor Washington (10); All: Conor Washington (15)
| Home colours | Away colours |

The 2015–16 season was Peterborough United's 56th year in the Football League and their third consecutive season in the third tier, League One. Along with League One, the club also competed in the FA Cup, League Cup and Football League Trophy. The season covered the period from 1 July 2015 to 30 June 2016.

== Squad ==
| No. | Name | Pos. | Nat. | Place of Birth | Age | Apps | Goals | Signed from | Date signed | Fee | Ends |
Goalkeepers
| 1 | Ben Alnwick | GK | (England) | Prudhoe | 39 | 86 | 0 | Leyton Orient | 25 July 2014 | Free | 2017 |
| 14 | Mark Tyler | GK | (England) | Norwich | 49 | 413 | 0 | Luton Town | 8 March 2016 | Loan | 2016 |
| 26 | Dion-Curtis Henry | GK | (England) | Ipswich | 29 | 1 | 0 | Academy | 1 July 2014 | Trainee | 2016 |
Defenders
| 2 | Michael Smith | RB | (Northern Ireland) | Ballyclare | 38 | 80 | 1 | Bristol Rovers | 25 July 2014 | Undisclosed | 2017 |
| 3 | Kgosi Ntlhe | LB | (South Africa) | Pretoria | 32 | 97 | 4 | Academy | 6 October 2011 | Trainee | 2016 |
| 5 | Gabriel Zakuani | CB | (Democratic Republic of the Congo) | Kinshasa | 40 | 245 | 9 | AEL Kalloni | 8 June 2014 | Free | 2016 |
| 6 | Jack Baldwin | CB | (England) | Barking | 33 | 35 | 0 | Hartlepool United | 31 January 2014 | £500,000 | 2018 |
| 12 | Ricardo Almeida Santos | CB | (Portugal) | Almada | 31 | 66 | 0 | Thurrock | 5 February 2014 | Free | 2017 |
| 18 | Andrew Fox | LB | (England) | Huntingdon | 33 | 15 | 0 | Midland/Odessa Sockers | 20 July 2015 | Free | 2017 |
| 29 | Bradley Maslen-Jones | CB | (England) | Wolverhampton | 28 | 0 | 0 | Academy | 10 March 2015 | Trainee | 2016 |
| 50 | Harry Toffolo | LB | (England) | Welwyn Garden City | 31 | 5 | 0 | Norwich City | 21 January 2016 | Loan | 2016 |
Midfielders
| 7 | Jon Taylor | RW | (England) | Liverpool | 34 | 64 | 10 | Shrewsbury Town | 4 June 2014 | Undisclosed | 2017 |
| 8 | Michael Bostwick | DM | (England) | Eltham | 38 | 174 | 9 | Stevenage | 9 July 2012 | Undisclosed | 2018 |
| 10 | Erhun Oztumer | AM | (Turkey) | London | 35 | 51 | 7 | Dulwich Hamlet | 9 June 2014 | Undisclosed | 2016 |
| 11 | Marcus Maddison | LW | (England) | Durham | 33 | 65 | 17 | Gateshead | 27 August 2014 | £250,000 | 2018 |
| 15 | Jermaine Anderson | CM | (England) | Camden Town | 30 | 66 | 7 | Academy | 1 August 2012 | Trainee | 2016 |
| 16 | Harry Beautyman | CM | (England) | Newham | 34 | 33 | 2 | Welling United | 25 November 2014 | Undisclosed | 2016 |
| 20 | Harry Anderson | RW | (England) | Slough | 29 | 17 | 0 | Academy | 1 January 2015 | Trainee | 2016 |
| 22 | Leonardo Da Silva Lopes | AM | (Portugal) | Lisbon | 27 | 4 | 0 | Academy | 1 July 2014 | Trainee | 2016 |
| 33 | Christopher Forrester | DM | (Republic of Ireland) | Dublin | 33 | 33 | 2 | St Patrick's Athletic | 29 August 2015 | Undisclosed | 2018 |
| 36 | Martin Samuelsen | AM | (Norway) | Haugesund | 29 | 16 | 2 | West Ham United | 24 November 2015 | Loan | 2016 |
| 42 | Adil Nabi | WG | (England) | Birmingham | 32 | 2 | 0 | West Bromwich Albion | 21 January 2016 | Undisclosed | 2019 |
| — | Callum Chettle | CM | (England) | Nottingham | 30 | 0 | 0 | Nuneaton Town | 23 January 2016 | Undisclosed | 2018 |
Forwards
| 19 | Joe Gormley | CF | (Northern Ireland) | Belfast | 36 | 6 | 0 | Cliftonville | 1 July 2015 | Free | 2018 |
| 21 | Tom Nichols | CF | (England) | Wellington | 33 | 3 | 1 | Exeter City | 1 February 2016 | Undisclosed | 2020 |
| 24 | Lee Angol | CF | (England) | Sutton | 32 | 28 | 7 | Luton Town | 20 July 2015 | Undisclosed | 2018 |
| 28 | Souleymane Coulibaly | ST | (Ivory Coast) | Abidjan | 31 | 32 | 6 | Bari | 20 July 2015 | Free | 2016 |
| 34 | Deon Moore | ST | (England) | England | 27–28 | 0 | 0 | Free agent | 20 July 2015 | Free | 2015 |
| 39 | Shaq Coulthirst | CF | (England) | Hackney | 31 | 9 | 1 | Tottenham Hotspur | 22 January 2016 | Undisclosed | 2019 |
| 41 | Aaron Williams | CF | (England) | Sandwell | 33 | 1 | 0 | Nuneaton Town | 23 January 2016 | Undisclosed | 2018 |
Out on Loan
| 4 | Shaun Brisley | CB | (England) | Macclesfield | 36 | 93 | 2 | Macclesfield Town | 31 January 2012 | Undisclosed | 2016 |
| 9 | Kyle Vassell | CF | (England) | Milton Keynes | 33 | 36 | 6 | Bishop's Stortford | 11 November 2013 | Undisclosed | 2016 |
| 23 | Jack Payne | CM | (England) | Gravesend | 34 | 150 | 6 | Gillingham | 30 June 2013 | Free | 2016 |
| 25 | Jack Friend | ST | (England) | King's Lynn | 29 | 0 | 0 | Academy | 10 March 2015 | Trainee | 2016 |
| 27 | Kieran Sadlier | LW | (Republic of Ireland) | Haywards Heath | 32 | 1 | 0 | St Mirren | 20 July 2015 | Free | 2016 |
| 29 | Jonathan Edwards | CF | (England) | Luton | 29 | 3 | 0 | Academy | 10 March 2015 | Trainee | 2016 |
| 33 | Luke James | CF | (England) | Amble | 31 | 34 | 2 | Hartlepool United | 1 September 2014 | Undisclosed | 2018 |

=== Statistics ===
As of 10 January 2016

| No. | Pos | Nat | Player | Total | | League One | | FA Cup | | League Cup | | League Trophy | |
| No. | Pos | Nat | Player | Apps | Goals | Apps | Goals | Apps | Goals | Apps | Goals | Apps | Goals |
|---|---|---|---|---|---|---|---|---|---|---|---|---|---|
| 1 | GK | (England) ENG | Ben Alnwick | 41 | 0 | 32+0 | 0 | 5+0 | 0 | 2+0 | 0 | 2+0 | 0 |
| 2 | DF | (Northern Ireland) NIR | Michael Smith | 34 | 0 | 27+1 | 0 | 3+1 | 0 | 0+0 | 0 | 1+1 | 0 |
| 3 | DF | (South Africa) RSA | Kgosi Ntlhe | 6 | 0 | 4+1 | 0 | 0+0 | 0 | 1+0 | 0 | 0+0 | 0 |
| 5 | DF | (Democratic Republic of the Congo) COD | Gabriel Zakuani | 20 | 3 | 16+1 | 3 | 2+0 | 0 | 1+0 | 0 | 0+0 | 0 |
| 6 | DF | (England) ENG | Jack Baldwin | 11 | 0 | 6+1 | 0 | 3+1 | 0 | 0+0 | 0 | 0+0 | 0 |
| 7 | MF | (England) ENG | Jon Taylor | 39 | 7 | 23+8 | 5 | 3+1 | 2 | 1+1 | 0 | 2+0 | 0 |
| 8 | MF | (England) ENG | Michael Bostwick | 34 | 3 | 25+1 | 3 | 4+0 | 0 | 1+1 | 0 | 2+0 | 0 |
| 10 | MF | (England) ENG | Erhun Oztumer | 29 | 6 | 22+1 | 6 | 4+1 | 0 | 0+0 | 0 | 1+0 | 0 |
| 11 | MF | (England) ENG | Marcus Maddison | 34 | 9 | 18+8 | 6 | 0+4 | 1 | 2+0 | 1 | 1+1 | 1 |
| 12 | DF | (Portugal) POR | Ricardo Almeida Santos | 35 | 0 | 26+2 | 0 | 4+0 | 0 | 1+0 | 0 | 2+0 | 0 |
| 13 | GK | (England) ENG | Stuart Moore (on loan from Reading) | 1 | 0 | 1+0 | 0 | 0+0 | 0 | 0+0 | 0 | 0+0 | 0 |
| 15 | MF | (England) ENG | Jermaine Anderson | 19 | 5 | 13+1 | 3 | 2+0 | 1 | 1+0 | 1 | 2+0 | 0 |
| 16 | MF | (England) ENG | Harry Beautyman | 18 | 0 | 9+3 | 0 | 3+1 | 0 | 0+0 | 0 | 0+2 | 0 |
| 18 | DF | (England) ENG | Andrew Fox | 15 | 0 | 3+7 | 0 | 1+3 | 0 | 0+0 | 0 | 0+1 | 0 |
| 19 | FW | (Northern Ireland) NIR | Joe Gormley | 6 | 0 | 4+0 | 0 | 0+0 | 0 | 1+1 | 0 | 0+0 | 0 |
| 20 | MF | (England) ENG | Harry Anderson | 7 | 0 | 3+2 | 0 | 0+0 | 0 | 1+1 | 0 | 0+0 | 0 |
| 21 | FW | (England) ENG | Tom Nichols | 3 | 1 | 2+1 | 1 | 0+0 | 0 | 0+0 | 0 | 0+0 | 0 |
| 22 | MF | (Portugal) POR | Leonardo Da Silva Lopes | 2 | 0 | 0+2 | 0 | 0+0 | 0 | 0+0 | 0 | 0+0 | 0 |
| 24 | FW | (England) ENG | Lee Angol | 29 | 7 | 18+5 | 7 | 5+0 | 0 | 0+0 | 0 | 1+0 | 0 |
| 26 | GK | (England) ENG | Dion-Curtis Henry | 1 | 0 | 0+1 | 0 | 0+0 | 0 | 0+0 | 0 | 0+0 | 0 |
| 28 | FW | (Ivory Coast) CIV | Souleymane Coulibaly | 32 | 5 | 14+13 | 5 | 0+2 | 0 | 1+1 | 0 | 0+1 | 0 |
| 33 | MF | (Republic of Ireland) IRL | Chris Forrester | 33 | 2 | 24+2 | 2 | 5+0 | 0 | 0+0 | 0 | 2+0 | 0 |
| 35 | DF | (England) ENG | Miles Addison | 3 | 0 | 2+1 | 0 | 0+0 | 0 | 0+0 | 0 | 0+0 | 0 |
| 36 | MF | (Norway) NOR | Martin Samuelsen (on loan from West Ham United) | 16 | 2 | 7+6 | 1 | 2+1 | 1 | 0+0 | 0 | 0+0 | 0 |
| 37 | FW | (England) ENG | Jordan Nicholson | 1 | 0 | 0+1 | 0 | 0+0 | 0 | 0+0 | 0 | 0+0 | 0 |
| 39 | FW | (England) ENG | Shaq Coulthirst | 9 | 1 | 5+2 | 0 | 2+0 | 1 | 0+0 | 0 | 0+0 | 0 |
| 41 | FW | (England) ENG | Aaron Williams | 1 | 0 | 0+1 | 0 | 0+0 | 0 | 0+0 | 0 | 0+0 | 0 |
| 42 | MF | (England) ENG | Adil Nabi | 2 | 0 | 1+1 | 0 | 0+0 | 0 | 0+0 | 0 | 0+0 | 0 |
| 50 | DF | (England) ENG | Harry Toffolo (on loan from Norwich City) | 5 | 0 | 4+1 | 0 | 0+0 | 0 | 0+0 | 0 | 0+0 | 0 |
Players currently out on loan:
| 4 | DF | (England) ENG | Shaun Brisley | 3 | 0 | 0+2 | 0 | 0+0 | 0 | 1+0 | 0 | 0+0 | 0 |
| 9 | FW | (England) ENG | Kyle Vassell | 6 | 0 | 1+3 | 0 | 0+0 | 0 | 0+1 | 0 | 1+0 | 0 |
| 23 | MF | (England) ENG | Jack Payne | 2 | 0 | 1+1 | 0 | 0+0 | 0 | 0+0 | 0 | 0+0 | 0 |
| 27 | MF | (Ireland) EIR | Kieran Sadlier | 1 | 0 | 0+0 | 0 | 0+0 | 0 | 1+0 | 0 | 0+0 | 0 |
Players who left the club during the season:
| 14 | FW | (England) ENG | Conor Washington | 32 | 16 | 21+4 | 10 | 3+0 | 4 | 2+0 | 1 | 2+0 | 1 |
| 17 | DF | (Scotland) SCO | Alex Davey (on loan from Chelsea) | 10 | 0 | 6+1 | 0 | 0+0 | 0 | 2+0 | 0 | 1+0 | 0 |
| 21 | DF | (England) ENG | Tobi Adebayo-Rowling | 5 | 0 | 3+1 | 0 | 0+0 | 0 | 1+0 | 0 | 0+0 | 0 |
| 31 | MF | (Wales) WAL | Jack Collison | 12 | 0 | 2+8 | 0 | 0+0 | 0 | 2+0 | 0 | 0+0 | 0 |
| 32 | DF | (Australia) AUS | Callum Elder (on loan from Leicester City) | 24 | 1 | 20+0 | 1 | 2+0 | 0 | 0+0 | 0 | 2+0 | 0 |
| 38 | DF | (England) ENG | Lawrie Wilson (on loan from Bolton Wanderers) | 4 | 0 | 1+1 | 0 | 2+0 | 0 | 0+0 | 0 | 0+0 | 0 |

==== Goals record ====
As of 20 January 2016

| Rank | No. | Po. | Name | League One | FA Cup | League Cup | League Trophy | Total |
|---|---|---|---|---|---|---|---|---|
| 1 | ~~14~~ | FW | (England) Conor Washington | 10 | 4 | 1 | 1 | 16 |
| 2 | 11 | MF | (England) Marcus Maddison | 6 | 2 | 1 | 0 | 9 |
| 3 | 7 | MF | (England) Jon Taylor | 5 | 2 | 0 | 0 | 7 |
| 3 | 24 | FW | (England) Lee Angol | 7 | 0 | 0 | 0 | 7 |
| 5 | 10 | MF | (England) Erhun Oztumer | 6 | 0 | 0 | 0 | 6 |
| 5 | 15 | MF | (England) Jermaine Anderson | 4 | 1 | 1 | 0 | 6 |
| 5 | 28 | FW | (Ivory Coast) Souleymane Coulibaly | 6 | 0 | 0 | 0 | 6 |
| 8 | 8 | MF | (England) Michael Bostwick | 3 | 0 | 0 | 0 | 3 |
| 8 | 5 | DF | (Democratic Republic of the Congo) Gabriel Zakuani | 3 | 0 | 0 | 0 | 3 |
| 10 | 33 | MF | (Republic of Ireland) Chris Forrester | 2 | 0 | 0 | 0 | 2 |
| 10 | 36 | MF | (Norway) Martin Samuelsen | 1 | 1 | 0 | 0 | 2 |
| 13 | 21 | FW | (England) Tom Nichols | 1 | 0 | 0 | 0 | 1 |
| 13 | ~~32~~ | DF | (New Zealand) Callum Elder | 1 | 0 | 0 | 0 | 1 |
| 13 | 35 | DF | (England) Miles Addison | 1 | 0 | 0 | 0 | 1 |
| 13 | 39 | FW | (England) Shaq Coulthirst | 0 | 1 | 0 | 0 | 1 |
| Total | | | | 54 | 10 | 2 | 0 | 66 |

==== Disciplinary record ====
As of 20 January 2016

| No. | Po. | Name | League One | | FA Cup | | League Cup | | League Trophy | | Total | |
| No. | Po. | Name | Yellow card | Red card | Yellow card | Red card | Yellow card | Red card | Yellow card | Red card | Yellow card | Red card |
|---|---|---|---|---|---|---|---|---|---|---|---|---|
| 1 | GK | (England) Ben Alnwick | 5 | 0 | 0 | 0 | 0 | 0 | 0 | 0 | 5 | 0 |
| 2 | DF | (England) Michael Smith | 6 | 1 | 1 | 0 | 0 | 0 | 0 | 0 | 7 | 1 |
| 3 | DF | (South Africa) Kgosi Ntlhe | 1 | 0 | 0 | 0 | 0 | 0 | 0 | 0 | 1 | 0 |
| 4 | DF | (England) Shaun Brisley | 1 | 0 | 0 | 0 | 0 | 0 | 0 | 0 | 1 | 0 |
| 5 | DF | (Democratic Republic of the Congo) Gabriel Zakuani | 2 | 1 | 0 | 0 | 1 | 0 | 0 | 0 | 3 | 1 |
| 6 | DF | (England) Jack Baldwin | 3 | 0 | 1 | 0 | 0 | 0 | 0 | 0 | 4 | 0 |
| 7 | MF | (England) Jon Taylor | 2 | 0 | 0 | 0 | 0 | 0 | 0 | 0 | 2 | 0 |
| 8 | MF | (England) Michael Bostwick | 7 | 0 | 0 | 0 | 2 | 0 | 1 | 0 | 10 | 0 |
| 9 | FW | (England) Kyle Vassell | 2 | 0 | 0 | 0 | 0 | 0 | 1 | 0 | 3 | 0 |
| 10 | MF | (England) Erhun Oztumer | 0 | 1 | 0 | 0 | 0 | 0 | 0 | 0 | 0 | 1 |
| 11 | MF | (England) Marcus Maddison | 1 | 0 | 0 | 0 | 1 | 0 | 0 | 0 | 2 | 0 |
| 12 | DF | (Portugal) Ricardo Almeida Santos | 8 | 1 | 1 | 0 | 0 | 0 | 0 | 0 | 9 | 1 |
| ~~14~~ | FW | (England) Conor Washington | 2 | 0 | 0 | 0 | 0 | 0 | 0 | 0 | 2 | 0 |
| 15 | MF | (England) Jermaine Anderson | 5 | 1 | 0 | 0 | 0 | 0 | 0 | 0 | 5 | 1 |
| 16 | MF | (England) Harry Beautyman | 2 | 0 | 0 | 0 | 0 | 0 | 0 | 0 | 2 | 0 |
| ~~17~~ | DF | (Scotland) Alex Davey | 1 | 0 | 0 | 0 | 0 | 0 | 0 | 0 | 1 | 0 |
| 18 | DF | (England) Andrew Fox | 2 | 0 | 1 | 0 | 0 | 0 | 0 | 0 | 3 | 0. |
| 19 | FW | (England) Joe Gormley | 1 | 0 | 0 | 0 | 0 | 0 | 0 | 0 | 1 | 0 |
| 20 | MF | (England) Harry Anderson | 1 | 0 | 0 | 0 | 0 | 0 | 0 | 0 | 1 | 0 |
| 22 | MF | (Portugal) Leonardo Da Silva Lopes | 1 | 0 | 0 | 0 | 0 | 0 | 0 | 0 | 1 | 0 |
| 24 | FW | (England) Lee Angol | 2 | 0 | 1 | 0 | 0 | 0 | 0 | 0 | 3 | 0 |
| 27 | MF | (England) Kieran Sadlier | 0 | 0 | 0 | 0 | 1 | 0 | 0 | 0 | 1 | 0 |
| 28 | FW | (Ivory Coast) Souleymane Coulibaly | 3 | 0 | 0 | 0 | 0 | 0 | 0 | 0 | 3 | 0 |
| 31 | MF | (Wales) Jack Collison | 1 | 0 | 0 | 0 | 0 | 0 | 0 | 0 | 1 | 0 |
| ~~32~~ | DF | (Australia) Callum Elder | 3 | 0 | 0 | 0 | 0 | 0 | 0 | 0 | 3 | 0 |
| 33 | MF | (Republic of Ireland) Chris Forrester | 5 | 0 | 2 | 0 | 0 | 0 | 0 | 0 | 7 | 0 |
| 35 | DF | (England) Miles Addison | 1 | 0 | 0 | 0 | 0 | 0 | 0 | 0 | 1 | 0 |
| 36 | MF | (Norway) Martin Samuelsen | 2 | 0 | 0 | 0 | 0 | 0 | 0 | 0 | 2 | 0 |
| 39 | FW | (England) Shaq Coulthirst | 1 | 0 | 0 | 0 | 0 | 0 | 0 | 0 | 1 | 0 |
| 50 | DF | (England) Harry Toffolo | 2 | 0 | 0 | 0 | 0 | 0 | 0 | 0 | 2 | 0 |
| Total | | | 71 | 5 | 7 | 0 | 5 | 0 | 2 | 0 | 85 | 5 |

== Transfers ==
=== Transfers in ===
| Date from | Position | Nationality | Name | From | Fee | Ref. |
|---|---|---|---|---|---|---|
| 1 July 2015 | ST | ENG | Deon Moore | Free agent | Free transfer | |
| 1 July 2015 | CM | WAL | Jack Collison | Ipswich Town | Free transfer | |
| 1 July 2015 | ST | NIR | Joe Gormley | Cliftonville | Undisclosed | |
| 20 July 2015 | ST | ENG | Lee Angol | Luton Town | Undisclosed | |
| 20 July 2015 | RW | CIV | Souleymane Coulibaly | Bari | Free transfer | |
| 20 July 2015 | LB | ENG | Andrew Fox | Odessa Sockers | Free transfer | |
| 20 July 2015 | LW | IRL | Kieran Sadlier | St Mirren | Free transfer | |
| 29 August 2015 | RW | IRE | Christopher Forrester | St Patrick's Athletic | Undisclosed | |
| 24 November 2015 | CB | ENG | Miles Addison | Unattached | Free transfer | |
| 24 December 2015 | AM | ENG | Jordan Nicholson | Histon | Undisclosed | |
| 21 January 2016 | ST | ENG | Adil Nabi | West Bromwich Albion | Undisclosed | |
| 22 January 2016 | ST | ENG | Shaq Coulthirst | Tottenham Hotspur | Undisclosed | |
| 1 February 2016 | CF | ENG | Tom Nichols | Exeter City | Undisclosed | |

=== Transfers out ===
| Date from | Position | Nationality | Name | To | Fee | Ref. |
|---|---|---|---|---|---|---|
| 1 July 2015 | CB | ENG | Christian Burgess | Portsmouth | £75,000 | |
| 1 July 2015 | DF | ENG | Liam Marshall | Ilkeston | Free transfer | |
| 1 July 2015 | RW | ENG | Nathaniel Mendez-Laing | Rochdale (Note: Following Mendez-Laing's release he joined Rochdale.) | Free transfer | |
| 1 July 2015 | CM | ENG | David Norris | Yeovil Town (Note: Following Norris' release he joined Yeovil Town.) | Released | |
| 1 July 2015 | GK | AUT | Bobby Olejnik | Exeter City (Note: Following Olejnik's release he joined Exeter City.) | Free transfer | |
| 29 July 2015 | CM | IRL | Kane Ferdinand | Dagenham & Redbridge (Note: Following Ferdinand's mutual departure he joined Dagenham & Redbridge.) | Free transfer | |
| 5 August 2015 | LW | ENG | Joe Newell | Rotherham United | Undisclosed | |
| 19 January 2016 | CF | ENG | Conor Washington | Queens Park Rangers | | |
| 13 February 2016 | DM | WAL | Jack Collison | Retired | — | |

Total incoming: ▲£2,875,000

=== Loans in ===
| Date from | Position | Nationality | Name | From | Until | Ref. |
|---|---|---|---|---|---|---|
| 8 August 2015 | CB | ENG | Alex Davey | Chelsea | 2 January 2016 | (Note: On 1 September 2015, Davey's loan was extended until 2 January 2016.) |
| 29 August 2015 | LB | AUS | Callum Elder | Leicester City | 4 January 2016 | (Note: On 22 September 2015, Elder's loan was extended until 4 January 2016.) |
| 24 November 2015 | AM | NOR | Martin Samuelsen | West Ham United | End of season | (Note: On 4 January 2016, Samuelsen's loan was extended to the end of the season.) |
| 4 January 2016 | RB | ENG | Lawrie Wilson | Bolton Wanderers | 1 February 2015 | |
| 21 January 2016 | LB | ENG | Harry Toffolo | Norwich City | End of season | (Note: On 21 January 2016, Toffolo signs on loan.) |
| 27 February 2016 | GK | ENG | Stuart Moore | Reading | March 2016 | |
| 5 March 2016 | MF | (England) | Simon Gillett | Yeovil Town | | |
| 8 March 2016 | GK | (England) | Mark Tyler | Luton Town | End of season | |

=== Loans out ===
| Date from | Position | Nationality | Name | To | Until | Ref. |
|---|---|---|---|---|---|---|
| 10 July 2015 | CF | ENG | Luke James | Bradford City | 1 February 2016 | |
| 23 July 2015 | ST | ENG | Jack Friend | Boston United | End of season | |
| 25 July 2015 | ST | ENG | Jonathan Edwards | Illeston | End of season | |
| 4 August 2015 | GK | (Slovakia) | Henrich Ravas | Boston United | End of season | |
| 18 August 2015 | LM | ENG | Andrew Fox | Kidderminster Harriers | 17 September 2015 | |
| 1 September 2015 | CM | ENG | Jack Payne | Leyton Orient | End of season | |
| 11 September 2015 | CB | ENG | Shaun Brisley | Northampton Town | 9 October 2015 | |
| 8 January 2016 | CF | ENG | Kyle Vassell | Shrewsbury Town | End of Season | |
| 27 January 2016 | CB | ENG | Shaun Brisley | Leyton Orient | End of Season | |
| 1 February 2016 | CF | ENG | Luke James | Hartlepool United | End of Season | |

== Competitions ==
=== Pre-season friendlies ===
On 29 May 2015, Peterborough United announced they will face Ipswich Town and Dulwich Hamlet during pre-season. Also a friendly against Barnet was confirmed. On 8 June 2015, it was confirmed West Ham United will visit on 11 July 2015. On 15 June 2015, the Posh added three more confirmed fixtures to the pre-season schedule. A date for the Chris Turner memorial match was announced on 16 June 2015. On 25 June 2015, Peterborough United announced a Tottenham Hotspur XI side will visit during pre-season.

| 8 July 2015 Friendly | Dulwich Hamlet | 2–3 | Peterborough United | East Dulwich |
| 19:45 BST | Clunis 6'; Drage 48' | Report | Anderson 8'; Gormley 61'; Taylor 88' | Stadium: Champion Hill; Attendance: 737 |

| 11 July 2015 Friendly | Peterborough United | 3–3 | West Ham United | Peterborough |
| 15:00 BST | Santos 8'; Taylor 39'; Bostwick 60' (pen.) | Report | Noble 12'; Sakho 13'; Samuelsen 23' | Stadium: London Road; Attendance: 3,916 |

| 15 July 2015 Friendly | Cliftonville | 0–6 | Peterborough United | Belfast, Northern Ireland |
| TBC BST | | Report | Trialist 28'; Vassell 34'; Gormley 49'; Washington (?); Taylor 85'; Bostwick 89' | Stadium: Solitude |

| 18 July 2015 Friendly | Peterborough United | 3–2 | Tottenham Hotspur XI | Peterborough |
| 15:00 BST | Gormley 27'; Washington 48'; Vassell 85' | Report | Harrison 59'; Azzaoui 77' | Stadium: London Road; Attendance: 3,852 (1,297) |

| 21 July 2015 Friendly | Barnet | 1–2 | Peterborough United | Canons Park |
| 19:45 BST | Gash 89' | Report | Coulibaly 50'; Anderson 66' | Stadium: The Hive Stadium |

| 25 July 2015 Friendly | Peterborough United | 0–0 | Ipswich Town | Peterborough |
| 15:00 BST | | Report | | Stadium: London Road; Attendance: 2,125 (632 Ipswich fans) |

| 28 July 2015 Friendly | Grimsby Town | 2–1 | Peterborough United | Cleethorpes |
| 19:30 BST | Marshall 50'; Arnold 83' | Report | Sadlier | Stadium: Blundell Park; Attendance: 1,389 (42 Posh fans) |

| 1 August 2015 Chris Turner Memorial Match | Peterborough United | 0–0 | Cambridge United | Peterborough |
| 15:00 BST | | Report | | Stadium: London Road |

| 4 August 2015 Friendly | Bishop's Stortford | 4–2 | Peterborough United | Bishop's Stortford |
| 19:45 BST | Furlonge 2', 33'; Merrifield 23'; Suarez 58' | Report | Vassell 50'; Coulibaly 71' | Stadium: ProKit UK Stadium |

=== League One ===
==== League table ====
| Pos | Team | Pld | W | D | L | GF | GA | GD | Pts |
|---|---|---|---|---|---|---|---|---|---|
| 11 | Sheffield United | 46 | 18 | 12 | 16 | 64 | 59 | +5 | 66 |
| 12 | Port Vale | 46 | 18 | 11 | 17 | 56 | 58 | −2 | 65 |
| 13 | Peterborough United | 46 | 19 | 6 | 21 | 82 | 73 | +9 | 63 |
| 14 | Southend United | 46 | 16 | 11 | 19 | 58 | 64 | −6 | 59 |
| 15 | Swindon Town | 46 | 16 | 11 | 19 | 64 | 71 | −7 | 59 |

Updated to match(es) played on 1 July 2016. Source: BBC Sport
Rules for classification: 1) Points; 2) Goal difference; 3) Number of goals scored

==== Matches ====
| 8 August 2015 1 | Rochdale | 2–0 | Peterborough United | Rochdale |
| 15:00 BST | Camps 18'; Noble-Lazarus 69' | Report | | Stadium: Spotland; Attendance: 3,319; Referee: Andy Haines |

| 15 August 2015 2 | Peterborough United | 2–1 | Colchester United | Peterborough |
| 15:00 BST | Maddison 31', 34' | Report | Bonne 30' | Stadium: London Road; Attendance: 5,339; Referee: Mark Haywood |

| 18 August 2015 3 | Peterborough United | 1–3 | Sheffield United | Peterborough |
| 19:30 BST | Coulibaly 59' | Report | Sammon 15', 72'; Baxter 85' | Stadium: London Road; Attendance: 6,526; Referee: Nigel Miller |

| 22 August 2015 4 | Burton Albion | 2–1 | Peterborough United | Burton upon Trent |
| 15:00 BST | El Khayati 36'; Beavon 54' | Report | Maddison 67'; Zakuani (red card) 58' | Stadium: Pirelli Stadium; Attendance: 3,407; Referee: Graham Salisbury |

| 29 August 2015 5 | Peterborough United | 1–1 | Gillingham | Peterborough |
| 15:00 BST | Taylor 90' | Report | Oshilaja 85' | Stadium: London Road; Attendance: 5,083; Referee: Keith Stroud |

| 5 September 2015 6 | Southend United | 2–1 | Peterborough United | Southend-on-Sea |
| 12:05 BST | Barrett 32'; Hunt 70' | Report | Maddison 90' | Stadium: Roots Hall; Attendance: 5,748; Referee: Simon Hooper |

| 12 September 2015 7 | Oldham Athletic | 1–5 | Peterborough United | Oldham |
| 15:00 BST | Murphy 48' | Report | Angol 14', 78'; Oztumer 38'; Coulibaly 62', 65' | Stadium: Boundary Park; Attendance: 3,566; Referee: Seb Stockbridge |

| 19 September 2015 8 | Peterborough United | 1–1 | Walsall | Peterborough |
| 15:00 BST | Bostwick 87' (pen.); J. Anderson (red card) 84' | Report | Sawyers 53' | Stadium: London Road Stadium; Attendance: 5,859; Referee: Mark Heywood |

| 26 September 2015 9 | Bradford City | 0–2 | Peterborough United | Bradford |
| 15:00 BST | | Report | 56' Angol; 57' Forrester | Stadium: Valley Parade; Attendance: 17,970; Referee: Paul Tierney |

| 29 September 2015 10 | Peterborough United | 2–3 | Bury | Peterborough |
| 19:45 BST | Oztumer (red card) 25'; Zakuani 43', 49' | Report | 28' Clarke; 64' Cameron; 81' Pope | Stadium: London Road Stadium; Attendance: 4,208; Referee: Steve Martin |

| 3 October 2015 11 | Peterborough United | 5–3 | Millwall | Peterborough |
| 15:00 BST | Angol 15'; Taylor 19', 81'; Forrester 69'; Washington 72' | Report | 52' Webster; 55' Craig; 74' Beevers | Stadium: London Road Stadium; Attendance: 6,402; Referee: Carl Boyeson |

| 10 October 2015 12 | Swindon Town | 1–2 | Peterborough United | Swindon |
| 15:00 BST | Bostwick 73' (o.g.) | Report | 38' Taylor; 52' Angol | Stadium: County Ground; Attendance: 7,025; Referee: Andy Madley |

| 17 October 2015 13 | Port Vale | 1–1 | Peterborough United | Stoke-on-Trent |
| 15:00 BST | Andoh 40' | Report | 56' (pen.) Bostwick | Stadium: Vale Park; Attendance: 4,864; Referee: Richard Clark |

| 20 October 2015 14 | Peterborough United | 2–3 | Wigan Athletic | Peterborough |
| 19:45 BST | Oztumer 61'; Coulibaly 81' | Report | 11' Wildschut; 15' Grigg; 82' Power | Stadium: London Road Stadium; Attendance: 4,765; Referee: Oliver Langford |

| 24 October 2015 15 | Peterborough United | 4–0 | Doncaster Rovers | Peterborough |
| 15:00 BST | Zakuani 9'; Oztumer 36'; Elder 46'; Washington 73' | Report | | Stadium: London Road Stadium; Attendance: 6,092; Referee: Mark Brown |

| 31 October 2015 16 | Coventry City | 3–2 | Peterborough United | Coventry |
| 15:00 GMT | Vincelot 56'; Armstrong 80', 87' | Report | 15' J Anderson; 36' Oztumer | Stadium: Ricoh Arena; Attendance: 11,853; Referee: Gavin Ward |

| 14 November 2015 17 | Peterborough United | 2–1 | Fleetwood Town | Peterborough |
| 15:00 GMT | Coulibaly 57'; J Anderson 77' | Report | 66' Ball | Stadium: London Road Stadium; Attendance: 5,462; Referee: Lee Collins |

| 21 November 2015 18 | Crewe Alexandra | 1–5 | Peterborough United | Crewe |
| 15:00 GMT | Colclough 64' | Report | 6' Taylor; 46' Washington; 47', 82' J Anderson; 54' Angol | Stadium: Alexandra Stadium; Attendance: 4,094; Referee: Charles Breakspear |

| 24 November 2015 19 | Peterborough United | 3–2 | Barnsley | Peterborough |
| 19:45 GMT | Angol 24'; Addison 62'; Maddison 73' | Report | 38' (pen.) Hourihane; 77' Winnall | Stadium: London Road Stadium; Attendance: 4,783; Referee: Nick Kinseley |

| 28 November 2015 20 | Scunthorpe United | 0–4 | Peterborough United | Scunthorpe |
| 15:00 GMT | | Report | 4', 82', 90' Washington; 49' Bostwick | Stadium: Glanford Park; Attendance: 3,790; Referee: Jeremy Simpson |

| 12 December 2015 21 | Peterborough United | 1–1 | Shrewsbury Town | Peterborough |
| 15:00 GMT | Washington 56' | Report | Barnett 79' | Stadium: London Road; Attendance: 5,568; Referee: Graham Horwood |

| 19 December 2015 22 | Blackpool | 2–0 | Peterborough United | Blackpool |
| 15:00 GMT | Cullen 3'; Potts 31' | Report | | Stadium: Bloomfield Road; Attendance: 6,204; Referee: Robert Lewis |

| 26 December 2015 23 | Peterborough United | 2–0 | Chesterfield | Peterborough |
| 15:00 GMT | Washington 45', 76' | Report | | Stadium: London Road Stadium; Attendance: 7,153; Referee: Andy Woolmer |

| 28 December 2015 24 | Walsall | 2–0 | Peterborough United | Walsall |
| 15:00 GMT | Demetriou 80'; Evans 89' | Report | | Stadium: Bescot Stadium; Attendance: 6,142; Referee: Darren England |

| 2 January 2016 25 | Sheffield United | 2–3 | Peterborough United | Sheffield |
| 15:00 GMT | Sharp 32' (pen.); Bostwick 84' (o.g.) | Report | 18' Washington; 48' Oztumer; 84' Samuelsen | Stadium: Brammall Lane; Attendance: 22,302; Referee: Darren Bond |

| 16 January 2016 26 | Peterborough United | 0–0 | Southend United | Peterborough |
| 15:00 GMT | | Report | | Stadium: London Road Stadium; Attendance: 7,057; Referee: Kevin Johnson |

| 23 January 2016 27 | Gillingham | 2–1 | Peterborough United | Gillingham |
| 19:45 GMT | Norris 49'; Dack 65' | Report | 25' Oztumer | Stadium: Priestfield Stadium; Attendance: 6,449; Referee: James Adcock |

| 26 January 2016 28 | Peterborough United | 0–1 | Burton Albion | Peterborough |
| 15:00 GMT | | Report | 3' Naylor | Stadium: London Road Stadium; Attendance: 4,798; Referee: Tim Robinson |

| 6 February 2016 29 | Chesterfield | 0–1 | Peterborough United | Chesterfield |
| 15:00 GMT | | Report | 55' Nichols; (red card) 58' Smith; (red card) 78' Almeida Santos | Stadium: Proact Stadium; Attendance: 6,544; Referee: David Coote |

| 13 February 2016 30 | Peterborough United | 0–4 | Bradford City | Peterborough |
| 15:00 GMT | | Report | 45', 68' Hanson; 56' Reid; 77' Davies | Stadium: London Road Stadium; Attendance: 5,816; Referee: Dean Whitestone |

| 20 February 2016 31 | Millwall | 3–0 | Peterborough United | London |
| 15:00 GMT | Morison 30', 62' | Report | 49' Gregory | Stadium: The Den; Attendance: 8,722; Referee: Michael Bull |

| 23 February 2016 32 | Peterborough United | 1–2 | Oldham Athletic | Peterborough |
| 19:45 GMT | Coulibaly 39' | Report | 2' Dummigan; 73' (pen.) Kelly | Stadium: London Road Stadium; Attendance: 3,544; Referee: Keith Hill |

| 27 February 2016 33 | Peterborough United | 1–2 | Swindon Town | Peterborough |
| 15:00 GMT | Maddison 12' (pen.) | Report | 49' Ajose; 82' Doughty | Stadium: London Road Stadium; Attendance: 5,124; Referee: Darren Handley |

| 1 March 2016 34 | Bury | 3–1 | Peterborough United | Bury |
| 19:45 GMT | L. Clarke 29'; Lowe 33'; Tutte 80' | Report | Maddison 52'; Almeida Santos (red card) 79' | Stadium: Gigg Lane; Attendance: 2,180 |

| 5 March 2016 35 | Wigan Athletic | 1–1 | Peterborough United | Wigan |
| 15:00 GMT | Grigg 71' | Report | Maddison 80' | Stadium: DW Stadium; Attendance: 8,877 |

| 12 March 2016 36 | Peterborough United | 2–3 | Port Vale | Peterborough |
| 15:00 GMT | Taylor 2'; Williams 41' | Report | Moore 49'; Hooper 86'; Dodds 89' | Stadium: London Road Stadium; Attendance: 4,942 |

| 19 March 2016 37 | Doncaster Rovers | 1–2 | Peterborough United | Doncaster |
| 15:00 GMT | Coppinger 5' | Report | Williams 44'; Almeida Santos 90+3' | Stadium: Keepmoat Stadium; Attendance: 7,884 |

| 25 March 2016 38 | Peterborough United | 3–1 | Coventry City | Peterborough |
| 19:45 GMT | Bostwick 45'; Angol 61'; Beautyman 69' | Report | Cole 65' | Stadium: London Road Stadium; Attendance: 6,021 |

| 2 April 2016 39 | Peterborough United | 3–0 | Crewe Alexandra | Peterborough |
| 15:00 BST | Beautyman 14', 40'; Angol 67' | Report | | Stadium: London Road Stadium; Attendance: 4,881 |

| 5 April 2016 40 | Fleetwood Town | 2–0 | Peterborough United | Fleetwood |
| 19:45 BST | Burns 38'; Jónsson 68' | Report | | Stadium: Highbury Stadium; Attendance: 2,134 |

| 9 April 2016 41 | Peterborough United | 1–2 | Rochdale | Peterborough |
| 15:00 BST | Smith 34' | Report | Bunney 8'; Mendez-Laing 23' | Stadium: London Road Stadium; Attendance: 4,785 |

| 16 April 2016 42 | Colchester United | 1–4 | Peterborough United | Colchester |
| 15:00 BST | Moncur 76' | Report | Taylor 2'; Fox 67'; Coulthirst 69'; Maddison 90+4' | Stadium: Colchester Community Stadium; Attendance: 5,965 |

| 19 April 2016 43 | Barnsley | 1–0 | Peterborough United | Barnsley |
| 19:45 BST | G. Williams 90' | Report | Forrester (red card) 43' | Stadium: Oakwell; Attendance: 8,886 |

| 23 April 2016 44 | Peterborough United | 0–2 | Scunthorpe United | Peterborough |
| 15:00 BST | | Report | Almeida Santos 51' (o.g.); Hopper 76' | Stadium: London Road Stadium; Attendance: 5,065 |

| 30 April 2016 45 | Shrewsbury Town | 3–4 | Peterborough United | Shrewsbury |
| 15:00 BST | Akpa Akpro 74'; Mangan 85'; Grimmer 89'; Black (red card) 90+5' | Report | Baldwin 42'; Angol 46', 69'; Taylor 90+4' | Stadium: New Meadow; Attendance: 6,019 |

| 8 May 2016 46 | Peterborough United | 5–1 | Blackpool | Peterborough |
| 12:30 BST | Maddison 48' (pen.); Taylor 74', 84', 86'; Coulthirst 76' | Report | Blyth 16' | Stadium: London Road; Attendance: 6,005 |

=== FA Cup ===
| 7 November 2015 First round | Burton Albion | 0–3 | Peterborough United | Burton upon Trent |
| 15:00 GMT | | Report | Washington 41', 71'; J Anderson 84'; Baldwin (red card) 90+4' | Stadium: Pirelli Stadium; Attendance: 2,517; Referee: David Webb |

| 6 December 2015 Second round | Peterborough United | 2–0 | Luton Town | Peterborough |
| 15:00 GMT | Washington 35'; Maddison 82' | Report | | Stadium: London Road Stadium; Attendance: 8,329; Referee: Nigel Miller |

| 9 January 2016 Third round | Peterborough United | 2–0 | Preston North End | Peterborough |
| 15:00 GMT | Samuelsen 7'; Washington 52' | Report | | Stadium: London Road Stadium; Attendance: 7,665; Referee: Tony Harrington |

| 30 January 2016 Fourth round | West Bromwich Albion | 2–2 | Peterborough United | West Bromwich |
| 15:00 GMT | Berahino 14', 84'; McClean (yellow card) 67' | Report | Coulthirst 79'; Smith (yellow card) 83'; Angol (yellow card) 84'; Taylor 86' | Stadium: The Hawthorns; Attendance: 22,517; Referee: Kevin Friend |

| 10 February 2016 Fourth round replay | Peterborough United | 1–1 (a.e.t.) (4–3 p) | West Bromwich Albion | Peterborough |
| 19:45 GMT | Taylor 55' | Report | Fletcher 71' | Stadium: London Road Stadium; Attendance: 10,632; Referee: Mike Jones |
| | Penalties |
| | Bostwick (penalty scored); Maddison (penalty scored); Samuelsen (penalty missed); Fox (penalty scored); Angol (penalty missed) | | Pocognoli (penalty scored); Berahino (penalty scored); Gardner (penalty scored); Fletcher (penalty missed); Chester (penalty scored) |

=== League Cup ===
| 11 August 2015 First round | Peterborough United | 2–0 | Crawley Town | Peterborough |
| 19:45 BST | Washington 2'; Maddison 49' | Report | | Stadium: London Road; Attendance: 2,500; Referee: Robert Lewis |

| 25 August 2015 Second round | Peterborough United | 1–4 | Charlton Athletic | Peterborough |
| 19:45 BST | J Anderson 90+3' | Report | Kennedy 3'; Ahearne-Grant 53' (pen.); Kashi 76'; Vetokele 87' | Stadium: London Road; Attendance: 2,771; Referee: Gary Sutton |

=== Football League Trophy ===
On 8 August 2015, live on Soccer AM the draw for the first round of the Football League Trophy was drawn by Toni Duggan and Alex Scott. The Posh will travel to Millwall.

| 1 September 2015 First round | Millwall | 1–0 | Peterborough United | Bermondsey |
| 19:45 BST | Williams 90' | Report | | Stadium: The Den; Attendance: 2,050; Referee: Keith Hill |
