= Harry Anderson (English footballer) =

English footballer (born 1997)

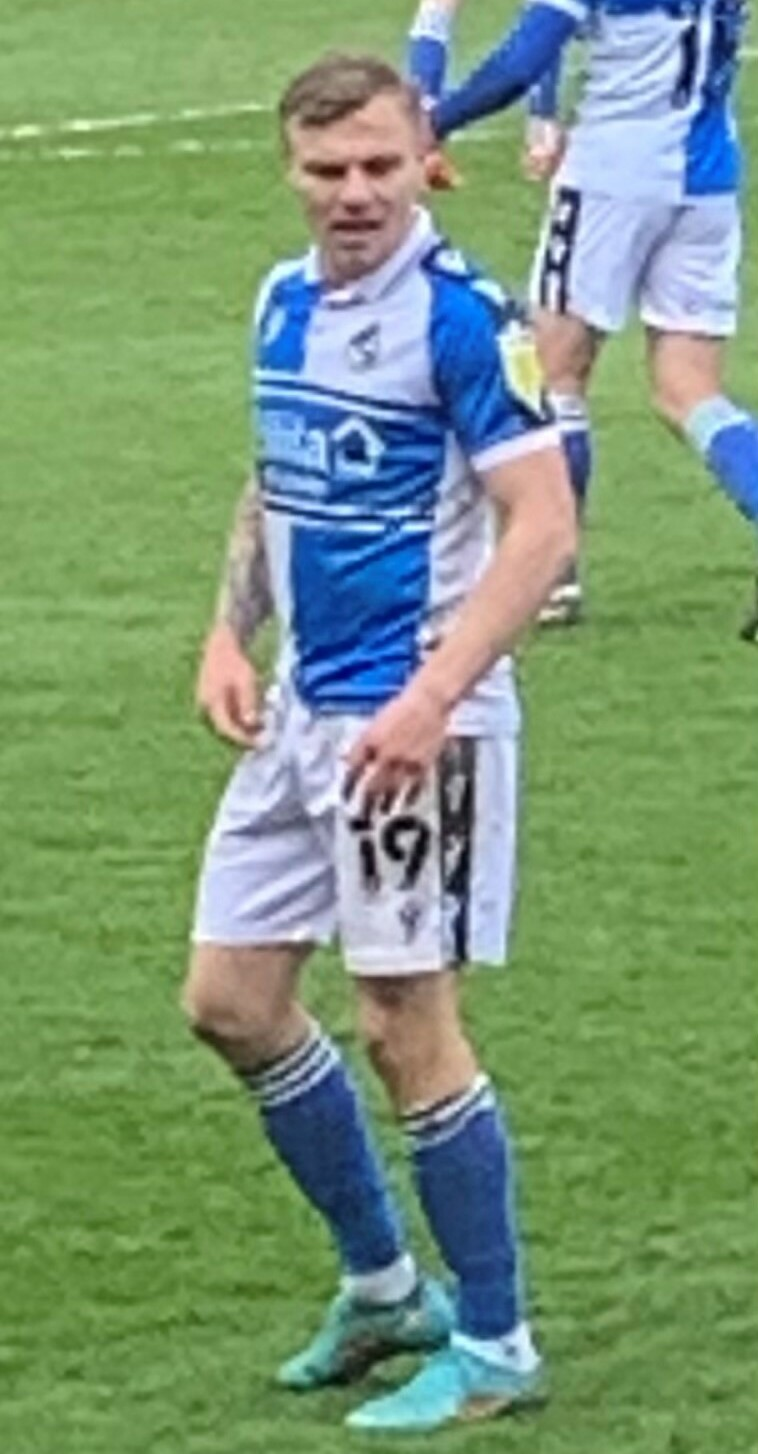
- Anderson at Bristol Rovers in 2022

Personal information
- Full name: Harry John Anderson
- Date of birth: 9 January 1997 (age 29)
- Place of birth: Chertsey, England
- Height: 5 ft 10 in (1.79 m)
- Position: Right winger

Team information
- Current team: Colchester United
- Number: 7

Youth career
- 2013–2014: Crawley Town
- 2014–2015: Peterborough United

Senior career*
Years	Team	Apps	(Gls)
2015–2017	Peterborough United	16	(0)
2016	→ Braintree Town (loan)	2	(0)
2016	→ St Albans City (loan)	13	(1)
2016	→ Lincoln City (loan)	18	(4)
2017	→ Lincoln City (loan)	8	(2)
2017–2021	Lincoln City	142	(19)
2021–2023	Bristol Rovers	72	(6)
2023–2024	Stevenage	1	(0)
2024	→ Colchester United (loan)	10	(2)
2024–	Colchester United	64	(14)
- * Club domestic league appearances and goals as of 11:19, 20 October 2025 (UTC)

Harry John Anderson (born 9 January 1997) is an English professional footballer who plays for EFL League Two club Colchester United. A versatile player, Anderson has been deployed as a right-back, right wing-back, right midfielder or right winger.

A Crawley Town youth product, Anderson joined Peterborough United's youth team in 2014 and made his first team debut a year later. He had loan spells at Braintree Town, St Albans City and Lincoln City prior to making a permanent move in July 2017.

== Career ==
=== Youth career ===
Anderson began his professional career in the youth ranks of Crawley Town, joining in the summer of 2013. The midfielder spent a single season with the Red Devils before the youth team was disbanded and subsequently moved to Peterborough United in July 2014, joining the Under-18s.

=== Peterborough United ===
On 28 February 2015, Anderson made his first team as a late substitute in a 2–0 home win against Bradford City. He went on to make 10 appearances during the 2014–15 campaign, before signing a new contract to extend his stay with the club. Anderson was named Peterborough United Young Player of the Year.

He made a further five league and two cup appearances during the 2015–16 season, and recorded two assists against former club Crawley Town in a 2–0 victory in August. His final appearance of the season came on 17 October, with Anderson coming off the bench in a 1–1 draw with Port Vale.

==== Braintree Town (loan) ====
On 15 January 2016, Anderson joined National League side Braintree Town on loan for the remainder of the season.

On 23 January, he made his debut in a 1–0 defeat at Forest Green Rovers with an 18-minute appearance. Anderson made his second and final appearance for the club on 26 January in a 1–0 victory at Wrexham. He was named on the bench for the following four games, before his loan spell was terminated by the club.

==== St Albans City (loan) ====
On 19 February 2016, Anderson joined National League South side St Albans City alongside Peterborough United teammate Jonathan Edwards. He made his debut the following day in a 1–0 defeat to Bath City.

On 1 March, Anderson scored his first goal for the club in a 1–0 win over Hemel Hempstead Town in the Herts Charity Cup semi-final. He added his second goal on 12 March, netting in a 3–1 victory at Hayes & Yeading United. Scoring his two goals during six matches in March, Anderson was named as the club's Player of the Month.

On 26 April, Anderson started in the Herts Charity Cup final defeat to Bishop's Stortford before being substituted at half-time. He returned to Peterborough at the end of the season having made 15 appearances.

=== Lincoln City ===
On 16 August 2016, Anderson joined National League club Lincoln City on a youth loan until 1 January. The move saw him reunited with manager Danny Cowley, who previously signed Anderson on loan at Braintree Town. He made his debut in a 1–0 defeat to Dagenham & Redbridge the same day with a 25-minute appearance from the bench. His first start for the club saw him record two assists in a 4–0 victory over Southport, before scoring his first goal in the subsequent 2–1 win at Macclesfield Town.

On 4 October, Anderson scored his second goal for the club in a 2–1 victory at Wrexham. He scored again four days later in a 1–1 draw at Bromley, before scoring his final goal for the club in a 5–2 win at Chester on 29 October. Not included in the squad to face York City on 22 November, Anderson was an unused substitute for the next two games before a final substitute appearance in a 2–1 victory over Tranmere Rovers on 17 December.

On 22 December, Anderson was recalled by Peterborough, amid interest from Football League clubs.

On 23 March, Anderson returned to Lincoln City on loan for the remainder of the season. The following day he marked his return with a substitute appearance in a 3–1 win over Forest Green Rovers.

On 20 July 2017, Anderson joined recently promoted League Two club Lincoln City for an undisclosed fee, signing a three-year contract. In July 2019 he signed a new contract. On the 4 June 2021, it was announced that he would be leaving at the expiration of his contract.

=== Bristol Rovers ===
On 13 July 2021, Anderson joined recently relegated League Two side Bristol Rovers on a two-year deal. On 2 October 2021, Anderson opened his account for the club when he gave his side the lead in an eventual 3–1 home defeat to Swindon Town. The season ended with a third career promotion for Anderson, a 7–0 thrashing of Scunthorpe United on the final day of the season seeing Rovers move into the final automatic promotion place on goals scored.

Having had a frustrating 2022–23 season due to injuries, Anderson underwent groin surgery in March 2023. With the winger due to be out on contract in the summer, he was linked with a number of League One and League Two clubs. In April 2023, having received a contract offer, it was revealed that club and player had reached an impasse. Following the final match of the season, manager Joey Barton admitted that they would not be offering the player a new contract on account of his injury record, instead offering him back to prove his fitness over pre-season. He departed the club at the end of the season.

=== Stevenage ===
On 16 June 2023, Anderson signed with League One side Stevenage. Having made just three appearances during the first half of the season, he joined Colchester United on loan until the end of the season in January 2024.

On 8 May 2024, Stevenage announced the player would be released in the summer once his contract expired.

=== Colchester United ===
On 13 June 2024, Anderson was announced to have agreed to return to League Two club Colchester United on a permanent two-year contract.

Anderson was named EFL League Two Player of the Month for October 2025 having scored five goals in four matches, including a first career hat-trick against Harrogate Town. On 16 May 2026 the club announced it had extended the player's contract.

== Career statistics ==
As of match played 20 October 2025

Appearances and goals by club, season and competition
Club	Season	League			FA Cup		League Cup		Other		Total	
Club	Season	Division	Apps	Goals	Apps	Goals	Apps	Goals	Apps	Goals	Apps	Goals
Peterborough United	2014–15	League One	10	0	0	0	0	0	0	0	10	0
Peterborough United	2015–16	League One	5	0	0	0	2	0	0	0	7	0
Peterborough United	2016–17	League One	1	0	0	0	0	0	0	0	1	0
Peterborough United	Total		16	0	0	0	2	0	0	0	18	0
Braintree Town (loan)	2015–16	National League	2	0	0	0	0	0	1 (Note: Appearance(s) in the FA Trophy.)	0	3	0
St Albans City (loan)	2015–16	National League South	13	1	0	0	0	0	0	0	13	1
Lincoln City (loan)	2016–17	National League	18	4	4	0	0	0	0	0	22	4
Lincoln City (loan)	2016–17	National League	8	2	0	0	0	0	0	0	8	2
Lincoln City (loan)	Total		41	7	4	0	0	0	1	0	46	7
Lincoln City	2017–18	League Two	40	6	0	0	1	0	7 (Note: 7 appearances in the EFL Trophy and 2 appearances in the EFL League Two play-offs.)	1	48	7
Lincoln City	2018–19	League Two	43	5	3	1	2	0	3 (Note: Appearances in EFL Trophy)	1	51	7
Lincoln City	2019–20	League One	30	5	2	0	2	2	3	0	37	7
Lincoln City	2020–21	League One	30	3	2	0	2	0	6 (Note: Appearance(s) in League One Play-offs & Football League Trophy)	3	40	6
Lincoln City	Total		143	19	7	1	7	2	19	5	176	27
Bristol Rovers	2021–22	League Two	44	6	3	0	1	0	1	0	49	6
Bristol Rovers	2022–23	League One	28	0	0	0	1	0	1	1	30	1
Bristol Rovers	Total		72	6	3	0	2	0	2	1	79	7
Stevenage	2023–24	League One	1	0	0	0	1	0	1	0	3	0
Colchester United (loan)	2023–24	League Two	10	2	0	0	0	0	0	0	10	2
Colchester United	2024–25	League Two	31	3	1	1	1	0	4	1	37	5
Colchester United	2025–26	League Two	33	11	1	1	0	0	2	0	36	12
Colchester United	Total		64	14	2	2	2	0	7	1	75	17
Career total			339	46	16	3	13	2	29	7	397	58

== Honours ==
Lincoln City

- EFL League Two: 2018–19
- EFL Trophy: 2017–18
- National League: 2016–17

Bristol Rovers

- EFL League Two third-place promotion: 2021–22

Individual

- EFL League Two Player of the Month: October 2025
