= 2014–15 Peterborough United F.C. season =

Peterborough United
2014–15 season
- Manager: Darren Ferguson (until 21 February); Dave Robertson (caretaker, from 21 February)
- Stadium: London Road Stadium
- League One: 9th
- FA Cup: Second round (eliminated by Colchester United)
- League Cup: First round (eliminated by Portsmouth)
- Football League Trophy: First round (eliminated by Leyton Orient)
Home colours	Away colours

The 2014–15 season was Peterborough United's 55th year in the Football League and their 2nd consecutive season in the third division of English football, Football League One.

On 21 February 2015, manager Darren Ferguson was sacked, and Dave Robertson was appointed as caretaker manager.

== Players ==
=== Squad information ===
No.	Name	Position (s)	Nationality	Place of birth	Date of birth (age)	Club caps	Club goals	Int. caps	Int. goals	Signed from	Date signed	Fee	Contract End
Goalkeepers
1	Bobby Olejnik	GK	(Austria)	Vienna	26 November 1986 (age 39)	88	0	–	–	Torquay United	18 June 2012	£300,000	30 June 2015
13	Joe Day	GK	(England)	Brighton	13 August 1990 (age 36)	3	0	–	–	Rushden & Diamonds	31 May 2011	Undisclosed	30 June 2015
13	Aidan Grant	GK	(England)	South Shields	27 March 1995 (age 31)	0	0	–	–	Aston Villa Under-18s	12 September 2014	Undisclosed	30 June 2015
27	Ben Alnwick	GK	(England)	Prudhoe	1 January 1987 (age 39)	4	0	–	–	Free agents	25 July 2014	Free	30 June 2017
Defenders
2	Michael Smith	RB	(Northern Ireland)	Ballyclare	4 September 1988 (age 37)	26	1	–	–	Bristol Rovers	25 July 2014	Undisclosed	30 June 2017
3	Kgosi Ntlhe	LB	(South Africa)	Petoria	21 February 1994 (age 32)	26	1	–	–	Academy	1 July 2011	Trainee	30 June 2015
4	Shaun Brisley	CB	(England)	Macclesfield	6 May 1990 (age 36)	39	0	–	–	Macclesfield Town	8 May 2012	Undisclosed	30 June 2014
5	Jack Baldwin	CB/DM	(England)	London	30 June 1993 (age 33)	5	0	–	–	Hartlepool United	31 January 2014	£500,000	30 June 2018
21	Christian Burgess	CB	(England)	Barking	7 October 1991 (age 34)	1	0	–	–	Middlesbrough	17 August 2014	£100,000	30 June 2018
22	Ricardo Santos	CB	(Portugal)	Almada	18 June 1995 (age 31)	1	0	–	–	Free agent	5 February 2014	Free	30 June 2017
25	Gabriel Zakuani	CB	(Democratic Republic of the Congo)	Kinshasa	31 May 1986 (age 40)	180	5	5	0	AEL Kalloni	8 June 2014	Free	30 June 2016
Midfielders
6	Michael Bostwick	DM/CB	(England)	London	17 May 1988 (age 38)	68	7	–	–	Stevenage	9 July 2012	Undisclosed	30 June 2015
7	Jon Taylor	RM	(England)	Liverpool	20 July 1992 (age 34)	3	0	–	–	Shrewsbury Town	4 June 2014	Undisclosed	30 June 2017
8	Jack Payne	CM	(England)	Gravesend	5 December 1991 (age 34)	39	2	–	–	Gillingham	30 June 2013	Undisclosed	30 June 2017
10	Erhun Oztumer	CAM/CM	(Turkey)	Gateshead	29 May 1991 (age 35)	–	–	–	–	Dulwich Hamlet	9 June 2014	Undisclosed	30 June 2016
11	Grant McCann	CM/LM	(Northern Ireland)	Belfast	15 April 1980 (age 46)	128	29	39	4	Scunthorpe United	24 May 2010	Free	30 June 2015
15	Jermaine Anderson	CM	(England)	London	16 May 1996 (age 30)	14	0	–	–	Academy	1 July 2013	Trainee	30 June 2015
17	Joe Newell	LW/LB	(England)	Tamworth	15 March 1993 (age 33)	67	2	–	–	Academy	1 July 2011	Trainee	30 June 2016
18	Kane Ferdinand	CM	(Republic of Ireland)	Newham	7 October 1992 (age 33)	34	1	–	–	Southend United	31 August 2012	£200,000	30 June 2016
19	Nathaniel Mendez-Laing	LW/RW	(England)	Birmingham	15 April 1992 (age 34)	65	8	–	–	Wolverhampton Wanderers	6 July 2012	£100,000	30 June 2015
20	Kenny McEvoy	LM/CM	(Republic of Ireland)	Waterford	4 September 1994 (age 31)	2	1	-	-	Tottenham Hotspur	9 August 2014	Loan	30 May 2015
30	Marcus Maddison	LW/RW/CF/CAM	(England)	Durham	26 September 1993 (age 32)	1	0	–	–	Gateshead	27 August 2014	£250,000	30 June 2018
Forwards
9	Luke James	CF/CAM	(England)	Northumberland	4 November 1994 (age 31)	0	0	–	–	Hartlepool United	1 September 2014	Undisclosed	30 June 2018
12	Kyle Vassell	CF/RW/LW	(England)	London	5 June 1992 (age 34)	12	5	–	–	Bishop's Stortford	11 November 2013	Undisclosed	30 June 2016
14	Conor Washington	CF	(England)	Chatham	18 May 1992 (age 34)	17	4	–	–	Newport County	28 January 2014	Undisclosed	30 June 2017
23	Tyrone Barnett	CF	(England)	Stevenage	28 October 1985 (age 40)	52	11	–	–	Crawley Town	8 May 2012	£1,200,000	30 June 2014

== Match details ==
=== Pre-season ===
12 July 2014	Barnet	0–1	Peterborough United	Canons Park
15:00 BST		Report	Ntlhe 53'	Stadium: The Hive Stadium; Attendance: 529

16 July 2014	Freamunde	2–4	Peterborough United	Freamunde
19:00 BST	Ansumane 52'; Pedrinho 73'	Report	Taylor 3'; Vassell 19', 30'; Assombalonga 67' (pen.)	Stadium: Complexo Desportivo do SC Freamunde

22 July 2014	Peterborough United	2–2	Wolverhampton Wanderers	Peterborough
19:45 BST	Vassell 15'; McCann 54' (pen.)	Report	Clarke 25'; Edwards 78'	Stadium: London Road Stadium; Attendance: 1,956 (327 Wolves fans)

26 July 2014	Peterborough United	2–1	Brighton & Hove Albion	Peterborough
15:00 BST	Assombalonga 56'; Vassell 63'	Report	Fenelon 4'	Stadium: London Road Stadium; Attendance: 1,777 (233 Brighton fans)

30 July 2014	Peterborough United	0–0	Charlton Athletic	Peterborough
19:45 BST		Report		Stadium: London Road Stadium; Attendance: 1,217 (184 Charlton fans)

5 August 2014	St Neots Town	2–5	Peterborough United	St Neots
19:45 BST	Davies 56'; Roberts 76'	Report	Oztumer 5'; Ntlhe 34'; Assombalonga 38', 43' (pen.); Barnett 73'	Stadium: Rowley Park; Attendance: 786

=== League One ===
==== League table ====
Pos	Team	Pld	W	D	L	GF	GA	GD	Pts
7	Bradford City	46	17	14	15	55	55	0	65
8	Rochdale	46	19	6	21	72	66	+6	63
9	Peterborough United	46	18	9	19	53	56	−3	63
10	Fleetwood Town	46	17	12	17	49	52	−3	63
11	Barnsley	46	17	11	18	62	61	+1	62

Updated to match(es) played on 3 May 2015. Source: BBC Sport
Rules for classification: 1) Points; 2) Goal difference; 3) Number of goals scored

==== Matches ====
The fixtures for the 2014–15 season were announced on 18 June 2014 at 9am.

9 August 2014 1	Rochdale	0–1	Peterborough United	Rochdale
15:00		Report	Vassell 61'	Stadium: Spotland Stadium; Attendance: 3,613 (799 Posh fans); Referee: Geoff Eltringham

16 August 2014 2	Peterborough United	3–2	Milton Keynes Dons	Peterborough
15:00	McEvoy 45+1'; Vassell 81', 85'	Report	Alli 48'; Powell 87'	Stadium: London Road Stadium; Attendance: 7,115 (813 MK Dons fans); Referee: Keith Stroud

19 August 2014 3	Peterborough United	1–2	Sheffield United	Peterborough
19:30	Brisley 34'	Report	Baxter 25'; Davies 84'	Stadium: London Road Stadium; Attendance: 6,578 (1,062 Sheffield United fans); Referee: Scott Duncan

23 August 2014 4	Bradford City	0–1	Peterborough United	Bradford
15:00		Report	Vassell 57'	Stadium: Valley Parade; Attendance: 13,546 (460 Posh fans); Referee: Graham Salisbury

30 August 2014 5	Colchester United	1–3	Peterborough United	Colchester
15:00	Sears 64'	Report	Washington 21'; Ntlhe 25'; Anderson 77'	Stadium: Colchester Community Stadium; Attendance: 4,014; Referee: Carl Boyeson

6 September 2014 6	Peterborough United	3–1	Port Vale	Peterborough
15:00	Maddison 31'; Vassell 72'; Payne 79'; Santos (yellow card) 90+4'		Jennings (yellow card) 42'; Neal (yellow card) 69'; Robertson (yellow card) 71'; Slew 83'	Stadium: London Road Stadium; Attendance: 6,024; Referee: James Linington

13 September 2014 7	Peterborough United	0–0	Notts County	Peterborough
15:00		Report		Stadium: London Road Stadium; Attendance: 6,567 (607 away); Referee: Tony Harrington

16 September 2014 8	Gillingham	2–1	Peterborough United	Gillingham
19:45	McDonald 26', 86' (pen.)	Report	Taylor 44'	Stadium: Priestfield Stadium; Attendance: 4,819 (282 Posh); Referee: Mark Heywood

20 September 2014 9	Yeovil Town	1–0	Peterborough United	Yeovil
15:00	Grant 88'	Report		Stadium: Huish Park; Attendance: 3,970; Referee: Simon Hooper

27 September 2014 10	Peterborough United	1–0	Fleetwood Town	Peterborough
15:00	Washington 45+1'	Report	Crainey (yellow card) 45+4' (yellow-red card) 82'; Sarcevic (yellow card) 81'; Pond (yellow card) 90+6'	Stadium: London Road Stadium; Attendance: 5,698 (118 Fleetwood); Referee: Andy D'Urso

4 October 2014 11	Peterborough United	2–2	Oldham Athletic	Peterborough
15:00	Bostwick 18'; Maddison 51'; Payne (yellow card) 54'	Report	Forte 6'; Wilson (yellow card) 48'; Kelly (yellow card) 51'; Kusunga 66'	Stadium: London Road Stadium; Attendance: 5,508 (361 Oldham fans); Referee: Chris Sarginson

11 October 2014 12	Crawley Town	1–4	Peterborough United	Crawley
15:00	McLeod 2'; Keane (yellow card) 64'; Harrold (yellow card) 82'	Report	Smith 11'; Bostwick (yellow card) 14'; Burgess 40'; Maddison 55'; Washington 58'; Newell (yellow card) 81'	Stadium: Broadfield Stadium; Attendance: 2,832; Referee: Michael Bull

18 October 2014 13	Peterborough United	2–1	Barnsley	Peterborough
15:00	Washington 45'; Maddison 69'	Report	Cole 15'; Williams (yellow card) 47'; Bailey (yellow card) 68' (yellow-red card) 77'	Stadium: London Road Stadium; Attendance: 7,217; Referee: Charles Breakspear

21 October 2014 14	Crewe Alexandra	1–0	Peterborough United	Crewe
19:45	Turton (yellow card) 26'; Haber 31' (pen.); Grant (yellow card) 86'; Cooper (yellow card) 90'	Report	Bostwick (red card) 30'; Payne (yellow card) 66'; Baldwin (yellow card) 83' (yellow-red card) 90+5'	Stadium: Gresty Road; Attendance: 3,524; Referee: Jeremy Simpson

25 October 2014 15	Coventry City	3–2	Peterborough United	Coventry
15:00	Johnson (yellow card) 27'; Haynes 49'; Thomas (yellow card) 51'; O'Brien 62'; Nouble 64' (yellow card) 65'	Report	Taylor 17'; Maddison 28'; Payne (yellow card) 74'	Stadium: Ricoh Arena; Attendance: 8,957; Referee: Roger East

1 November 2014 16	Peterborough United	1–2	Scunthorpe United	Peterborough
15:00	Washington 57'; Bostwick (yellow card) 90+1'	Report	Williams 14' (yellow card) 54'; Almeida Santos 64' (o.g.); McSheffrey (yellow card) 70'; Bishop (yellow card) 75'	Stadium: London Road Stadium; Attendance: 6,275; Referee: Darren Bond

15 November 2014 17	Walsall	0–0	Peterborough United	Walsall
15:00	Cook (yellow card) 52'; Sawyers (yellow card) 53'	Report	Taylor (yellow card) 17'; Newell (yellow card) 53'; Burgess (yellow card) 67'	Stadium: Bescot Stadium; Attendance: 5,495; Referee: Peter Bankes

22 November 2014 18	Peterborough United	1–2	Swindon Town	Peterborough
15:00	Newell 90+2'	Report	Williams 33'; Obika 47'	Stadium: London Road Stadium; Attendance: 7,182; Referee: Phil Gibbs

28 November 2014 19	Peterborough United	0–3	Bristol City	Peterborough
19:45	Zakuani (yellow card) 90+3'	Report	Freeman 11', 64'; Wilbraham 16'	Stadium: London Road Stadium; Attendance: 6,804; Referee: Paul Tierney

13 December 2014 20	Leyton Orient	1–2	Peterborough United	Leyton
15:00	Cuthbert (yellow card) 28'; Batt 39'	Report	McLean 9'; Oztumer (yellow card) 37', (goal) 47'; Payne (yellow card) 49'; Newell (yellow card) 72' (yellow-red card) 90+7'	Stadium: Brisbane Road; Attendance: 5,546; Referee: Kevin Johnson

20 December 2014 21	Peterborough United	0–1	Preston North End	Peterborough
15:00	McLean (yellow card) 49'; Bostwick (yellow card) 69'	Report	Beckford (yellow card) 44' (goal) 45+1'; Browne (yellow card) 64'; Little (yellow card) 90+3'	Stadium: London Road Stadium; Attendance: 6,803; Referee: Darren Sheldrake

26 December 2014 22	Chesterfield	3–2	Peterborough United	Chesterfield
15:00	Zakuani 10' (o.g.); Gnanduillet 34'; Raglan (yellow card) 47'; Doyle 54' (yellow card) 79'; Humphreys (yellow card) 77'; Banks (yellow card) 77'	Report	Bostwick 62'; Burgess (yellow card) 66'; Maddison 71'; Mendez-Laing (yellow card) 87'	Stadium: Proact Stadium; Attendance: 8,353; Referee: David Coote

28 December 2014 23	Peterborough United	0–0	Doncaster Rovers	Peterborough
15:00	Bostwick (yellow card) 47'	Report	de Val (yellow card) 26'; Wabara (yellow card) 57'; Keegan (yellow card) 62'	Stadium: London Road Stadium; Attendance: 6,895; Referee: Gary Sutton

10 January 2015 24	Peterborough United	0–2	Colchester United	Peterborough
15:00	Payne (yellow card) 38'; Burgess (yellow card) 42'; Oztumer (yellow card) 45'; Smith (yellow card) 62'; Bostwick (yellow card) 71'	Report	Hewitt (yellow card) 21' (goal) 84'; Sears 54'; Wynter (yellow card) 67'; Watt (yellow card) 81'	Stadium: London Road Stadium; Attendance: 5,524; Referee: Jeremy Simpson

17 January 2015 25	Port Vale	2–1	Peterborough United	Burslem
15:00	Birchall 32'; Williamson 47'	Report	Washington 21'; Oztumer (yellow card) 77'	Stadium: Vale Park; Attendance: 4,446; Referee: Carl Berry

24 January 2015 26	Notts County	1–2	Peterborough United	Nottingham
15:00 GMT	Smith (yellow card) 24'; Carroll (yellow card) 26'; Thompson 41'	Report	Maddison 13'; Brisley (yellow card) 33'; Burgess 62' (yellow card) 75'; Smith (yellow card) 89'	Stadium: Meadow Lane; Attendance: 5,960; Referee: Graham Scott

31 January 2015 27	Peterborough United	1–0	Yeovil Town	Peterborough
15:00 GMT	Beautyman 28'	Report		Stadium: London Road Stadium; Attendance: 5,146; Referee: Mick Russell

7 February 2015 28	Fleetwood Town	1–1	Peterborough United	Fleetwood
15:00	Crainey (yellow card) 17'; Roberts 78'; Hunter (yellow card) 87'	Report	Newell 64' (yellow card) 87'	Stadium: Highbury Stadium; Attendance: 3,188; Referee: Andy D'Urso

10 February 2015 29	Peterborough United	1–2	Gillingham	Peterborough
19:45	Bostwick (yellow card) 36'; Payne 55'	Report	Egan (yellow card) 9'; Dack 30'; Marquis 79'	Stadium: Abax Stadium; Attendance: 4,449; Referee: James Adcock

14 February 2015 30	Peterborough United	2–1	Rochdale	Peterborough
15:00	Beautyman 4'; Burgess 7' (yellow card) 80'; Brisley (yellow card) 73'; M. Smith (yellow card) 89'	Report	Rafferty 24' (yellow card) 90+2'; Bunney (yellow card) 43'	Stadium: Abax Stadium; Attendance: 5,163; Referee: Keith Hill

17 February 2015 31	Bristol City	2–0	Peterborough United	Bristol
19:45	Flint 9'; Agard 48'	Report	Smith (yellow card) 34'	Stadium: Ashton Gate; Attendance: 11,101; Referee: Christopher Sarginson

21 February 2015 32	Milton Keynes Dons	3–0	Peterborough United	Milton Keynes
15:00 GMT	Grigg 4'; Reeves 30', 45+1'; Lewington (yellow card) 83'	Report	Burgess (yellow card) 82'	Stadium: Stadium mk Attendance: 11,162; Referee: Dean Whitestone

28 February 2015 33	Peterborough United	2–0	Bradford City	Peterborough
15:00 GMT	Zakuani 52'; Vassell (yellow card) 56'; Newell (yellow card) 61'; Bostwick 90' (pen.)	Report		Stadium: ABAX Stadium; Attendance: 6,494; Referee: (England) Graham Horwood

3 March 2015 34	Sheffield United	1–2	Peterborough United	Sheffield
19:30 GMT	Done 65'	Report	Payne (yellow card) 23' (goal) 88'; Vassell (yellow card) 41'; Newell (yellow card) 58'; Washington 90'	Stadium: Bramall Lane; Attendance: 18,604; Referee: (England) Oliver Langford

7 March 2015 35	Peterborough United	1–0	Leyton Orient	Peterborough
15:00 GMT	Taylor 25'; Maddison (red card) 90'	Report	O'Neill (yellow card) 57'	Stadium: ABAX Stadium; Attendance: 6,525; Referee: (England) Mark Brown

14 March 2015 36	Doncaster Rovers	0–2	Peterborough United	Doncaster
15:00 GMT	Stevens (yellow card) 37'	Report	James 16'; Payne (yellow card) 31'; Ntlhe (yellow card) 52'; Washington (yellow card) 53' (goal) 88'; Bostwick (yellow card) 74'	Stadium: Keepmoat Stadium; Attendance: 11,520; Referee: (England) Nigel Miller

17 March 2015 37	Preston North End	2–0	Peterborough United	Preston, Lancashire
19:45 GMT	Johnson 37'; Huntington (yellow card) 45'; Beckford 81'	Report	Bostwick (yellow card) 53'	Stadium: Deepdale; Attendance: 8,856; Referee: (England) Geoff Eltringham

21 March 2015 38	Peterborough United	1–0	Chesterfield	Peterborough
15:00 GMT	Bostwick 27'; Santos (yellow card) 50' (yellow-red card); Newell (yellow card) 83'	Report		Stadium: ABAX Stadium; Attendance: 6,612; Referee: (England) Rob Lewis

28 March 2015 39	Peterborough United	0–1	Coventry City	Peterborough
15:00 GMT		Report	Turgott 70'	Stadium: ABAX Stadium; Attendance: 7,325; Referee: (England) Iain Williamson

3 April 2015 40	Scunthorpe United	2–0	Peterborough United	Scunthorpe
15:00 GMT	Madden 40'; McSheffrey (yellow card) 71'; Robinson 73'	Report		Stadium: Glanford Park; Attendance: 4,216; Referee: (England) Carl Berry

6 April 2015 41	Peterborough United	0–0	Walsall	Peterborough
15:00 GMT	Bostwick (yellow card) 49'	Report	O'Connor (yellow card) 66'	Stadium: ABAX Stadium; Attendance: 6,711; Referee: (England) Darren Handley

11 April 2015 42	Swindon Town	1–0	Peterborough United	Swindon
15:00 GMT	Turnbull (yellow card) 8'; Toffolo (yellow card) 23'; Hylton 71'	Report	Smith (yellow card) 28'	Stadium: County Ground; Attendance: 7,126; Referee: (England) Andy Davies

14 April 2015 43	Peterborough United	1–1	Crewe Alexandra	Peterborough
19:45 GMT	Bostwick (yellow card) 18'; Washington 66'; Norris (yellow card) 81'	Report	Dalla Valle 3' (yellow card) 44'; Grant (yellow card) 19'; Leigh (yellow card) 34'; Guthrie (yellow card) 81'	Stadium: ABAX Stadium; Attendance: 4,338; Referee: (England) Andy Woolmer

18 April 2015 44	Barnsley	1–1	Peterborough United	Barnsley
15:00 GMT	Hourihane (yellow card) 41'; Berry 90'	Report	Ntlhe (yellow card) 15' (yellow-red card); Washington 16'	Stadium: Oakwell; Attendance: 8,924; Referee: (England) Seb Stockbridge

25 April 2015 45	Peterborough United	4–3	Crawley Town	Peterborough
15:00 GMT	Washington 43' 90'; Bostwick 50' 87'	Report	Elliott 29'; Pogba 57'; Simpson 66'; Tomlin (yellow card) 90'	Stadium: ABAX Stadium; Attendance: 6,270; Referee: (England) Charles Breakspear

3 May 2015 46	Oldham Athletic	1–1	Peterborough United	Oldham
12:15 GMT	Poleon 9' (yellow card) 89'	Report	Edwards (red card) 67'; Bostwick 76' (yellow card) 90'	Stadium: Boundary Park; Attendance: 3,943; Referee: (England) Gary Sutton

=== FA Cup ===
The draw for the first round of the FA Cup was made on 27 October 2014.

8 November 2014 Round One	Peterborough United	2–1	Carlisle United	Peterborough
15:00	Burgess 42', 90+1'; Vassell (yellow card) 45'	Report	Asamoah 8'	Stadium: London Road Stadium; Attendance: 3,168; Referee: Scott Mathieson

7 December 2014 Round Two	Colchester United	1–0	Peterborough United	Colchester
16:30	Watt (yellow card) 31'; Moncur 90+1' (yellow card) 90+2'	Report	Anderson (yellow card) 66'	Stadium: Colchester Community Stadium; Attendance: 2,905; Referee: Tony Harrington

=== League Cup ===
The draw for the first round was made on 17 June 2014 at 10am. Peterborough United were drawn away to Portsmouth.

12 August 2014 Round One	Portsmouth	1–0	Peterborough United	Portsmouth
19:45	Storey 12'	Report		Stadium: Fratton Park; Attendance: 7,726 (384 Posh fans); Referee: Brendan Malone

=== Football League Trophy ===
2 September 2014 Round One	Peterborough United	2–3	Leyton Orient	Peterborough
19:45	Maddison 16'; James 90+4'	Report	Dagnall 4', 47'; Pritchard 62'; Vincelot (red card) 69'	Stadium: London Road Stadium; Attendance: 3,149 (166 Orient fans); Referee: Dean Whitestone

== Transfers ==
=== In ===
No.	Pos.	Nat.	Name	Age	EU	Moving from	Type	Transfer window	Ends	Transfer fee	Source
10	MF	(Turkey)	Erhun Oztumer	23	EU	Dulwich Hamlet	Transfer	Summer	2016	Undisclosed	
7	MF	(England)	Jon Taylor	21	EU	Shrewsbury Town	Transfer	Summer	2017	Undisclosed	
25	DF	(Democratic Republic of the Congo)	Gabriel Zakuani	28	EU	AEL Kalloni (Greece)	Free transfer	Summer	2016	Free	
2	DF	(Northern Ireland)	Michael Smith	25	EU	Bristol Rovers	Transfer	Summer	2017	Undisclosed	
27	GK	(England)	Ben Alnwick	27	EU	Leyton Orient	Free transfer	Summer	2017	Free	
21	DF	(England)	Christian Burgess	22	EU	Middlesbrough	Transfer	Summer	2018	£100,000	
30	MF	(England)	Marcus Maddison	20	EU	Gateshead	Transfer	Summer	2018	£250,000	
9	MF	(England)	Luke James	19	EU	Hartlepool United	Transfer	Summer	2018	Undisclosed	
23	MF	(England)	David Norris	33	EU	Leeds United	Free transfer	Winter	2015	Free	

=== Out ===
No.	Pos.	Nat.	Name	Age	EU	Moving to	Type	Transfer window	Transfer fee	Source
2	DF	(England)	Craig Alcock	26	EU	Sheffield United	Released	Summer	Free	
—	MF	(Scotland)	Peter Grant	20	EU	Falkirk (Scotland)	Released	Summer	Free	
16	MF	(Republic of Ireland)	Daniel Kearns	22	EU	Carlisle United	Released	Summer	Free	
20	DF	(England)	Nathaniel Knight-Percival	27	EU	Shrewsbury Town	Released	Summer	Free	
14	MF	(England)	Tommy Rowe	25	EU	Wolverhampton Wanderers	Released	Summer	Free	
31	DF	(England)	Mark Little	25	EU	Bristol City	Free transfer	Summer	Free	
29	GK	(England)	Alex Lynch	19	EU	Wycombe Wanderers	Free transfer	Summer	Free	
7	MF	(Scotland)	Danny Swanson	27	EU	Coventry City	Free transfer	Summer	Free	
33	FW	(England)	Nicky Ajose	22	EU	Leeds United	Transfer	Summer	Undisclosed	
9	FW	(Democratic Republic of the Congo)	Britt Assombalonga	21	EU	Nottingham Forest	Transfer	Summer	Undisclosed	
32	MF	(England)	Tom Conlon	18	EU	Stevenage	Transfer	Winter	Undisclosed	
—	DF	(England)	Michael Richens	19	EU	Stevenage	Transfer	Winter	Undisclosed	
—	MF	(Northern Ireland)	Grant McCann	34	EU	Linfield (Northern Ireland)	Free transfer	Winter	Free	
23	FW	(England)	Tyrone Barnett	29	EU	Shrewsbury Town	Transfer	Winter	Undisclosed	

EU = if holds or not a European Union passport; Country: when 2 flags, 1st flag = country that plays for internationally, 2nd flag = country of birth; N = number on jersey; P = Position (for position name, pause mouse pointer on abbreviation); Name = Name on jersey (for more extensive name, pause mouse pointer on name); Age = age on the day of the signing; Moving from = only indicate the club the player was playing before start playing for this club in this season, for the type of the moving see Status column; Moving to = only indicates the club the player is going to play next, for the type of the moving see Status column; Ends = when the player's current contract ends; n/a = Not applicable.

=== Loans in ===
No.	Pos.	Name	Country	Age	Loan club	Started	Ended	Start source	End source
20	MF	Kenny McEvoy	(Republic of Ireland)	19	Tottenham Hotspur	24 July 2014	12 November 2014		
21	DF	Christian Burgess	(England)	22	Middlesbrough	19 August 2014	21 August 2014		
20	FW	Aaron McLean	(England)	31	Bradford City	18 November 2014	30 June 2015		
35	MF	Harry Beautyman	(England)	22	Welling United	24 November 2014	1 January 2015		
36	FW	Craig Mackail-Smith	(Scotland)	30	Brighton & Hove Albion	27 November 2014	23 December 2014		
13	GK	Scott Loach	(England)	26	Rotherham United	15 January 2015	16 February 2015		
—	DF	Alan Sheehan	(Republic of Ireland)	28	Bradford City	26 March 2015	30 June 2015		
—	DF	James Pearson	(England)	22	Leicester City	26 March 2015	30 June 2015		
—	FW	Luke Williams	(England)	21	Middlesbrough	26 March 2015	30 June 2015		

Sources: For loan start source see "Start source". For loan end source see "End source".
EU = if holds or not a European Union passport; Country: when 2 flags, 1st flag = country that plays for internationally, 2nd flag = country of birth; No. = number on jersey; P = Position (for position name, pause mouse pointer on abbreviation); Name = Name on jersey (for more extensive name, pause mouse pointer on name); In/Out = In: The player came in on loan, Out: The player went out on loan; Loan club = the club that the player moved on loan to or the club that the player came from on loan; Started = the date when the player's loan started; Ended = the date when the player's loan ended.

=== Loans out ===
No.	Pos.	Name	Country	Age	Loan club	Started	Ended	Start source	End source
1	GK	Bobby Olejnik	(Austria)	27	Scunthorpe United	19 August 2014	16 September 2014		
13	GK	Joe Day	(England)	24	Newport County	28 August 2014	25 September 2014		
23	FW	Tyrone Barnett	(England)	28	Oxford United	10 September 2014	12 December 2014		
4	DF	Shaun Brisley	(England)	24	Scunthorpe United	25 September 2014	3 January 2015		
18	MF	Kane Ferdinand	(Republic of Ireland)	22	Cheltenham Town	20 November 2014	18 January 2015		
1	GK	Bobby Olejnik	(Austria)	28	York City	5 January 2015	30 June 2015		
19	MF	Nathaniel Mendez-Laing	(England)	22	Cambridge United	18 February 2015	5 May 2015		
12	FW	Kyle Vassell	(England)	22	Oxford United	26 March 2015	30 June 2015		

Sources: For loan start source see "Start source". For loan end source see "End source".
EU = if holds or not a European Union passport; Country: when 2 flags, 1st flag = country that plays for internationally, 2nd flag = country of birth; No. = number on jersey; P = Position (for position name, pause mouse pointer on abbreviation); Name = Name on jersey (for more extensive name, pause mouse pointer on name); In/Out = In: The player came in on loan, Out: The player went out on loan; Loan club = the club that the player moved on loan to or the club that the player came from on loan; Started = the date when the player's loan started; Ended = the date when the player's loan ended.
