= Ricardo Santos (footballer, born 1995) =

Cape Verdean footballer (born 1995)

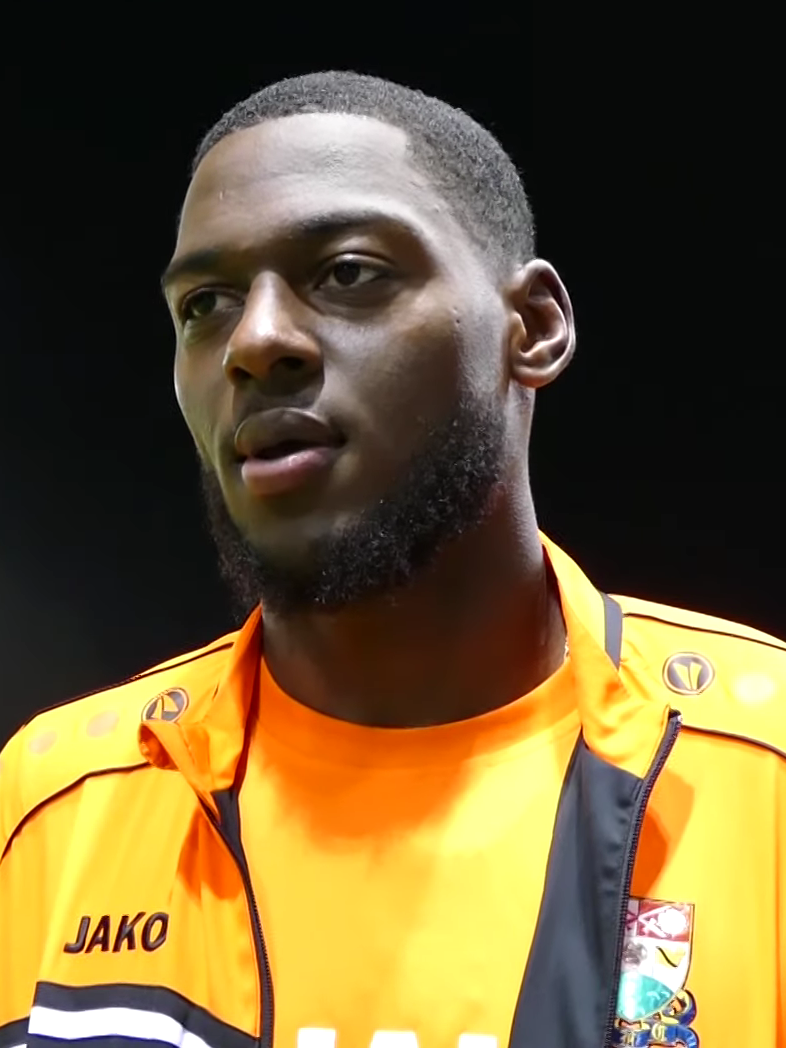
- Santos playing for Barnet in 2019

Personal information
- Full name: Ricardo Alexandre Almeida Santos
- Date of birth: 18 June 1995 (age 31)
- Place of birth: Almada, Portugal
- Height: 1.96 m (6 ft 5 in)
- Position: Centre-back

Team information
- Current team: Sheffield Wednesday
- Number: 4

Youth career
- –2012: Dagenham & Redbridge

Senior career*
Years	Team	Apps	(Gls)
2012–2013	Dagenham & Redbridge	0	(0)
2013	→ Billericay Town (loan)	4	(0)
2013	Dover Athletic	0	(0)
2013–2014	Thurrock	19	(1)
2014–2016	Peterborough United	63	(1)
2017–2020	Barnet	84	(6)
2020–2025	Bolton Wanderers	172	(4)
2025–2026	Swansea City	1	(0)
2026–	Sheffield Wednesday	6	(0)

International career^{‡}
2025–	Cape Verde	1	(0)
- * Club domestic league appearances and goals as of 21:56, 20 November 2026 (UTC) ‡ National team caps and goals as of 00:56, 15 November 2025 (UTC)

Ricardo Alexandre Almeida Santos (Portuguese: [ʀi.ˈkaɾ.du ɐ.lɨ.ˈʃɐ̃.dɾɨ al.ˈmej.dɐ ˈsɐ̃.tuʃ]; born 18 June 1995) is a professional footballer who plays as a centre-back for EFL League One club Sheffield Wednesday. Born in Portugal, he represents the Cape Verde national team.

== Club career ==
Santos was a youth team player at Dagenham & Redbridge, making one appearance in the matchday squad, before he was released and signed by Thurrock manager Mark Stimson, following a spell at Dover Athletic where he made no appearances. He impressed for the Isthmian League club, making 24 appearances, and was signed by Peterborough United manager Darren Ferguson on a three-and-a-half-year contract in February 2014. Peterborough paid £8000 for him. He made his League One debut on 3 May in a 0–0 draw with Port Vale at London Road. Santos scored his first goal for the club when he scored a late winner against Doncaster Rovers on 19 March 2016.

On 1 January 2017, Santos joined Barnet for a fee of £100,000. He made his debut on the following day in a 1–0 win over Plymouth Argyle. He left the club at the end of the 2019–20 season having spent two and a half seasons with the Bees, making 94 appearances, scoring six goals.

=== Bolton Wanderers ===
Santos signed for Bolton Wanderers on a two-year deal on 3 August 2020. His debut came on 5 September in Bolton's first match of the season, a 2–1 home defeat against Bradford in the first round of the EFL Cup. On 1 March 2021, Santos signed a new contract with Bolton until 2023. He was named as EFL League Two Player of the Month for February 2021. On 21 May 2021, following the team's direct promotion to the EFL League One, he was announced to have been voted as Bolton Wanderers' Player of the Year for the 2020–21 season. Plus, he was named in the league's Team of the Year, together with his team-mate Eoin Doyle.

On 22 October 2021, following the sudden departure of Antoni Sarcevic to Stockport County, Santos was appointed by manager Ian Evatt as Bolton's new captain. He was named in the Team of the Year for the second consecutive year, this time in League One, for the 2021–22 season. On 26 May 2022, Santos signed a new three-year deal with Bolton Wanderers which would keep him at the club until 2025.

On 11 February 2023, Santos scored his first goals for Bolton with a brace in a 5–0 win at his former team Peterborough United, Bolton's 5000th league game. On 2 April, he started in the 2023 EFL Trophy final which Bolton won 4–0 against Plymouth Argyle. He was named in both the EFL and PFA Teams of the Season for the 2022–23 season, the third season in a row he had been named in Teams of the Year. A year later, he was named in the PFA Team of the Year again, his fourth consecutive appearance.

On 21 September 2024, Bolton manager Ian Evatt announced that Santos would be replaced as captain by George Thomason for the 2024–25 season. On 7 May 2025, the club confirmed that Santos would leave at the end of his contract, having made 207 appearances and scored six goals in all competitions for them.

=== Swansea City ===
On 6 June 2025, Santos agreed to join Championship side Swansea City on a free transfer, signing a two-year contract set to be effective from 1 July. During a pre-season friendly away to Cheltenham, Santos hyper-extended his leg, causing him to miss significant time with injury. Santos played only one game by January 2026, leading Swansea to accept a bid from Reading. The move fell through however, after he failed a medical.

=== Sheffield Wednesday ===
On 19 June 2026, Santos signed for League One club Sheffield Wednesday on an initial one-year deal for an undisclosed fee. He made his debut on 20 August 2026, coming off the bench in the 0–1 defeat to Bradford City.

== International career ==
Born in Portugal, Santos is of Cape Verdean descent.

In May 2025, he accepted a call-up to the Cape Verde national team for a set of friendlies against Malaysia and Georgia. He played for the Tubarões Azuis on 3 June in a behind closed doors training match, playing 90 minutes in a 3–0 win over Malaysia. As it was a training match, it wasn't considered an official appearance.

Santos made his official debut for Cape Verde in a friendly against Egypt on 17 November 2025.

== Career statistics ==
As of 20 November 2026

Appearances and goals by club, season and competition
Club	Season	League			FA Cup		League Cup		Other		Total	
Club	Season	Division	Apps	Goals	Apps	Goals	Apps	Goals	Apps	Goals	Apps	Goals
Dagenham & Redbridge	2012–13	League Two	0	0	0	0	0	0	0	0	0	0
Billericay Town (loan)	2012–13	Conference South	4	0	—		—		—		4	0
Thurrock	2013–14	IL Division One North	19	1	2	0	—		2 (Note: Appearances in FA Trophy)	0	23	1
Peterborough United	2013–14	League One	1	0	—		—		0	0	1	0
Peterborough United	2014–15	League One	24	0	1	0	1	0	0	0	26	0
Peterborough United	2015–16	League One	37	1	4	0	1	0	1 (Note: Appearances in EFL Trophy)	0	43	1
Peterborough United	2016–17	League One	1	0	1	0	1	0	2	0	5	0
Peterborough United	Total		63	1	6	0	3	0	3	0	75	1
Barnet	2016–17	League Two	15	2	0	0	0	0	0	0	15	2
Barnet	2017–18	League Two	42	3	1	0	2	0	2	0	47	3
Barnet	2018–19	National League	5	0	0	0	—		0	0	5	0
Barnet	2019–20	National League	22	1	2	0	—		3 (Note: One appearance in FA Trophy, two appearances in National League playoffs)	0	27	1
Barnet	Total		84	6	3	0	2	0	5	0	94	6
Bolton Wanderers	2020–21	League Two	46	0	1	0	1	0	0	0	48	0
Bolton Wanderers	2021–22	League One	37	0	2	0	1	0	3	0	43	0
Bolton Wanderers	2022–23	League One	30	3	1	0	1	0	7 (Note: Five appearances in EFL Trophy, two appearances in League One play-offs)	0	39	3
Bolton Wanderers	2023–24	League One	34	0	4	1	1	0	6 (Note: Three appearances in EFL Trophy, three appearance in League One play-offs)	1	45	2
Bolton Wanderers	2024–25	League One	25	1	0	0	3	0	4	0	32	1
Bolton Wanderers	Total		172	4	8	1	7	0	20	1	207	6
Swansea City	2025–26	Championship	1	0	0	0	0	0	—		1	0
Sheffield Wednesday	2026–27	League One	6	0	1	0	1	0	1	0	9	0
Career total			349	12	20	1	13	0	31	1	413	14

=== International ===
As of 18 November 2025

National team	Year	Apps	Goals
Cape Verde	2025	1	0
Total		1	0

== Honours ==
Bolton Wanderers

- EFL League Two third-place promotion: 2020–21
- EFL Trophy: 2022–23

Individual

- EFL League Two Player of the Month: February 2021
- PFA Team of the Year: 2020–21 League Two, 2021–22 League One, 2022–23 League One, 2023–24 League One
- Bolton Wanderers Player of the Year: 2020–21
- EFL League One Team of the Season: 2022–23
