= Kgosi Ntlhe =

South African soccer player (born 1994)

Personal information
- Full name: Kgosietsile Ntlhe
- Date of birth: 21 February 1994 (age 32)
- Place of birth: Pretoria, South Africa
- Height: 1.75 m (5 ft 9 in)
- Position: Defender

Team information
- Current team: Banbury United

Youth career
- 2009–2011: Peterborough United

Senior career*
Years	Team	Apps	(Gls)
2011–2016	Peterborough United	76	(4)
2011	→ St Albans City (loan)	4	(0)
2016–2017	Stevenage	22	(0)
2017–2019	Rochdale	41	(3)
2019–2020	Scunthorpe United	18	(1)
2020–2022	Barrow	27	(0)
2022–2023	Scunthorpe United	9	(0)
2024–	Banbury United		

International career^{‡}
2012	South Africa U20	5	(0)
2013	South Africa	1	(0)
- * Club domestic league appearances and goals as of 11 January 2023 ‡ National team caps and goals as of 12 October 2013

Kgosietsile "Kgosi" Ntlhe (English: /ˈkɒsi əŋˈklɛər/ KOSS-ee əng-KLAIR; born 21 February 1994) is a South African professional footballer who plays as a defender for English Southern League Premier Division Central Banbury United. He made one appearance for the South Africa national team in 2013.

== Club career ==
Born in Pretoria, Ntlhe joined Peterborough United in 2009 from Southside United and signed a two-year apprenticeship in the summer of 2010. He signed his first professional contract for the club in February 2011. In October 2011, Ntlhe joined Southern Premier side St Albans City on a one-month loan deal. He made his debut for the Saints in a 2–2 draw with Bedford Town. On 21 April 2012, Ntlhe made his professional debut for Posh, coming on as a half-time substitute for Lee Frecklington in a 2–2 draw with Watford. Following the club's relegation to League One in 2013, Ntlhe played regularly in the following two seasons. However, he only made eight appearances in 2015–16 and joined Stevenage on undisclosed terms at the end of that season.

After one season with Stevenage, Ntlhe was released in June 2017.

In July 2017, he joined Rochdale on a two-year contract. He was offered a new contract by Rochdale at the end of the 2018–19 season.

Instead, on 4 July 2019, Ntlhe signed for EFL League Two side Scunthorpe United on a one-year deal.

In September 2020 he signed for League Two newcomers Barrow. After two seasons with the club, he was released in May 2022.

On 12 July 2022, Ntlhe returned to former club Scunthorpe United on a six-month deal following their relegation to the National League. He left the club in January.

On 10 August 2024, Ntlhe joined Banbury United of the Southern League Premier Division.

== International career ==
In May and June 2012, Ntlhe participated in the 2012 Cape Town International Challenge, an exhibition tournament open to players under 20 years of age. He played in all of South Africa's games, meeting Argentina, Nigeria and Ghana in the group stage before losing to Brazil in the semi-final on penalties after a 2–2 draw. South Africa finished third place in the competition, having beaten Japan on penalties in the third place playoff. In mid-August, Ntlhe was called up to the South African senior team for the first time to play two friendlies against Brazil and Mozambique. He made his international debut on 12 October 2013 in a 1–1 draw against Morocco at the Adrar Stadium.

== Personal life ==
In September 2019, he was involved in a dispute with Danny Drinkwater.

== Career statistics ==
=== Club ===
As of 13 May 2022

Appearances and goals by club, season and competition
Club	Season	League			FA Cup		League Cup		Other		Total	
Club	Season	Division	Apps	Goals	Apps	Goals	Apps	Goals	Apps	Goals	Apps	Goals
Peterborough United	2011–12	Championship	2	0	0	0	0	0	—		2	0
Peterborough United	2012–13	Championship	12	1	0	0	2	0	—		14	1
Peterborough United	2013–14	League One	27	2	3	0	2	0	3 (Note: Two appearances in the Football League Trophy and one in the League One play-offs)	1	35	3
Peterborough United	2014–15	League One	28	1	1	0	1	0	0	0	30	1
Peterborough United	2015–16	League One	7	0	0	0	1	0	0	0	8	0
Peterborough United	Total		76	4	4	0	6	0	3	1	89	5
St Albans City (loan)	2011–12	Southern Premier Division	4	0	0	0	—		1 (Note: Appearance in the FA Trophy)	0	5	0
Stevenage	2016–17	League Two	22	0	1	0	0	0	1 (Note: Appearances in the Football League Trophy)	0	24	0
Rochdale	2017–18	League One	22	0	2	0	2	0	5	0	29	0
Rochdale	2018–19	League One	19	3	0	0	2	0	2	0	23	1
Rochdale	Total		41	3	2	0	4	0	7	0	54	3
Scunthorpe United	2019–20	League Two	18	1	0	0	1	0	2	0	21	1
Barrow	2020–21	League Two	22	0	1	0	1	0	2	0	26	0
Barrow	2021–22	League Two	5	0	0	0	1	0	1	0	7	0
Barrow	Total		27	0	1	0	2	0	3	0	33	0
Career total			188	8	8	0	13	0	17	1	226	9

== Honours ==
Peterborough United

- Football League Trophy: 2013–14
