= Harry Beautyman =

English footballer (born 1992)

Personal information
- Full name: Harry Beautyman
- Date of birth: 1 April 1992 (age 34)
- Place of birth: Newham, England
- Height: 5 ft 10 in (1.78 m)
- Position: Midfielder

Team information
- Current team: Dagenham & Redbridge

Youth career
- 2007–2009: Leyton Orient

Senior career*
Years	Team	Apps	(Gls)
2009–2011	Leyton Orient	0	(0)
2010	→ St Albans City (loan)	5	(1)
2010–2011	→ Hastings United (loan)	19	(2)
2011–2013	Sutton United	81	(21)
2013–2015	Welling United	49	(14)
2014–2015	→ Peterborough United (loan)	5	(0)
2015–2016	Peterborough United	35	(5)
2016–2017	Northampton Town	21	(3)
2017–2018	Stevenage	10	(0)
2018–2024	Sutton United	214	(40)
2024–2026	Woking	77	(21)
2026–	Dagenham & Redbridge	0	(0)

International career
2013–2014	England C	2	(1)
- * Club domestic league appearances and goals as of 19:14, 18 May 2026 (UTC)

Harry Beautyman (born 1 April 1992) is an English professional footballer who plays as a central midfielder for National League South club Dagenham & Redbridge.

== Club career ==
=== Leyton Orient ===
Born in Newham, London, Beautyman was a regular in Leyton Orient's youth and reserve teams before being called up to the first team squad to cover for injuries during the 2009–10 season. He was retained in the Orient squad by new manager Russell Slade for the following season, and went on a month's loan to St Albans City on 22 October 2010. He featured in St Albans' 4–0 FA Cup defeat at Luton Town on 23 October, and made his league debut in the 2–1 defeat at Ebbsfleet United on 30 October. He scored his first senior goal in his next game, a 1–1 draw at Chelmsford City on 2 November.

On 30 December 2010, Beautyman signed on loan for Hastings United until the end of the 2010–11 season. He made his debut for the Us in the 2–1 defeat at home to Maidstone United on 8 January 2011, scoring his first goal on 11 January in the 2–1 home defeat to Fleet Town in the Isthmian League Cup.

=== Sutton United ===
Beautyman was released by Orient in May 2011, and subsequently joined Sutton United on a short-term deal in August. After impressing at Sutton and scoring on his debut in a 4–1 win at Tonbridge Angels, he signed an 18-month contract in December.

=== Welling United ===
At the end of the 2012–13 season, Beautyman left Sutton in order to play at a higher level, and he signed for Welling United in August.

=== Peterborough United ===
On 24 November 2014, Beautyman signed on loan with Football League One club Peterborough United, with a view to a permanent move in January 2015. He made his Football League debut as a substitute in the 3–0 home defeat to Bristol City on 28 November. He signed a permanent deal with Peterborough in the January transfer window.

=== Northampton Town ===
On 21 July 2016, Beautyman signed for Northampton Town on a two-year deal from Peterborough United for a nominal fee.

=== Stevenage ===
In June 2017, Beautyman joined League Two side Stevenage on a free transfer. He scored his first goal for Stevenage in an EFL Trophy tie against Oxford United on 29 August 2017.

=== Return to Sutton ===
Beautyman re-joined his former club, National League side Sutton United, on a permanent deal on 4 January 2018. He signed for Sutton for an undisclosed fee and on a 2 1/2-year contract. He made his first appearance on 6 January 2018 in a 2–0 away victory over Gateshead.

Following relegation at the end of the 2023–24 season, the club announced that Beautyman would be departing the club upon the expiration of his contract.

=== Woking ===
Following his departure from Sutton United, Beautyman signed for Woking for the 2024–25 season.

For February 2025 Beautyman received Cards Trust player of the month having passed ten goals for the season.

On 18 May 2026, the club announced that Beautyman had rejected the offer of a contract and would depart the club.

=== Dagenham & Redbridge ===
On 19 May 2026, Beautyman joined National League South club Dagenham & Redbridge.

== International career ==
While at Sutton United, Beautyman was selected for the England C team, and made his debut in the 6–1 victory over Bermuda on 4 June 2013. After joining Welling United, he was called up again for a match against an Estonia U23 side at The Shay in Halifax on 18 November 2014. He scored England's second goal in their 4–2 victory.

== Career statistics ==
As of match played 25 April 2026.

Appearances and goals by club, season and competition
Club	Season	League			FA Cup		League Cup		Other		Total	
Club	Season	Division	Apps	Goals	Apps	Goals	Apps	Goals	Apps	Goals	Apps	Goals
Leyton Orient	2010–11	League One	0	0	0	0	0	0	0	0	0	0
St Albans City (loan)	2010–11	Conference South	5	1	1	0	—		1 (Note: Appearance(s) in FA Trophy)	0	7	1
Hastings United (loan)	2010–11	Isthmian Premier Division	19	2	—		—		1 (Note: Appearance in Isthmian League Cup)	1	20	3
Sutton United	2011–12	Conference South	43	11	6	0	—		7 (Note: One appearance in FA Trophy, four appearances and two goals in Surrey Senior Cup, two appearances in Conference South play-offs)	2	54	13
Sutton United	2012–13	Conference South	38	10	1	0	—		5 (Note: Four appearances in FA Trophy, one appearance in Surrey Senior Cup)	0	44	10
Sutton United	Total		81	21	7	0	—		12	2	100	23
Welling United	2013–14	Conference Premier	28	3	2	0	—		0	0	30	3
Welling United	2014–15	Conference Premier	21	11	1	0	—		0	0	22	11
Welling United	Total		49	14	3	0	—		0	0	52	14
Peterborough United (loan)	2014–15	League One	5	0	—		—		—		5	0
Peterborough United	2014–15	League One	13	2	—		—		—		13	2
Peterborough United	2015–16	League One	22	3	4	0	0	0	1 (Note: Appearance in Football League Trophy)	0	27	3
Peterborough United	Total		40	5	4	0	0	0	1	0	45	5
Northampton Town	2016–17	League One	21	3	0	0	3	0	3 (Note: Appearances in EFL Trophy)	1	27	4
Stevenage	2017–18	League Two	10	0	1	0	0	0	3	1	14	1
Sutton United	2017–18	National League	14	1	—		—		4 (Note: Two appearances in FA Trophy, one appearance in Surrey Senior Cup, one appearance in National League play-offs)	0	18	1
Sutton United	2018–19	National League	33	4	2	1	—		4 (Note: Two appearances in FA Trophy, one appearance in Scottish Challenge Cup, one appearance in Surrey Senior Cup)	0	39	5
Sutton United	2019–20	National League	34	15	2	1	—		2	1	38	17
Sutton United	2020–21	National League	40	11	1	0	—		3	1	44	12
Sutton United	2021–22	League Two	19	2	0	0	1	0	3	0	23	2
Sutton United	2022–23	League Two	33	2	0	0	1	0	2	0	36	2
Sutton United	2023–24	League Two	41	5	3	0	3	1	3	1	50	7
Sutton United	Total		214	40	8	2	5	1	21	3	248	46
Woking	2024–25	National League	35	10	2	2	—		7 (Note: Five appearances in FA Trophy; Two Appearances in National League Cup)	2	44	14
Woking	2025–26	National League	42	11	1	0	—		3 (Note: One appearance in FA Trophy, Two appearances in National League Cup)	0	46	11
Woking	Total		77	21	3	2	—		10	2	87	25
Career total			516	107	27	4	8	1	52	19	603	123

== Honours ==
Sutton United

- National League: 2020–21
- EFL Trophy runner-up: 2021–22

Individual

- National League Team of the Year: 2020–21
