= Jermaine Anderson (English footballer) =

English footballer

Personal information
- Full name: Jermaine Barrington Anderson
- Date of birth: 16 May 1996 (age 30)
- Place of birth: Camden, England
- Height: 6 ft 2 in (1.88 m)
- Position: Midfielder

Team information
- Current team: Hemel Hempstead Town
- Number: 21

Youth career
- –2012: Arsenal
- 2012: Peterborough United

Senior career*
Years	Team	Apps	(Gls)
2012–2019	Peterborough United	76	(5)
2018	→ Doncaster Rovers (loan)	9	(1)
2019–2020	Bradford City	18	(1)
2020–2021	Aldershot Town	31	(4)
2021–2025	Woking	86	(5)
2025–2026	Hemel Hempstead Town	6	(0)

International career
2014	England U18	2	(0)
2015	England U20	2	(0)
- * Club domestic league appearances and goals as of 13:35, 29 May 2026 (UTC)

Jermaine Barrington Anderson (born 16 May 1996) is an English professional footballer who plays as a midfielder for National League South club Hemel Hempstead Town.

== Career ==
=== Early life and career ===
Anderson was born in Camden, London. He was released by Arsenal age 16 before joining Peterborough United's youth system in 2012.

=== Peterborough United ===
On 6 November 2012, Anderson was an unused substitute for Peterborough in a 1–0 defeat to Brighton & Hove Albion. On 17 November, he made his professional debut with a 13-minute cameo appearance in a 4–1 defeat to Blackburn Rovers.

On 27 August 2013, Anderson made his first appearance of the season as a substitute in a 6–0 League Cup victory over Reading. After being named on the bench in the opening weeks of the season, Anderson made his full debut for the club in a 3–2 defeat to Brentford on 26 November. He remained in the team to play a further 10 consecutive league fixtures.

On 7 December, Anderson made his FA Cup debut while recording an assist in a 5–0 second round victory at Tranmere Rovers. He also played in the third round and third round replay as Peterborough fell to Kidderminster Harriers.

Missing out on the Football League Trophy second round and last 16 victories, Anderson made his debut in the competition in a 3–0 quarter-final victory at Newport County on 10 December. He played 45 minutes of the semi-final first leg against Swindon Town, and watched the second leg from the bench. Anderson did not feature in the squad that beat Chesterfield 3–1 in the final, but collected his first piece of silverware. Making a one-minute league appearance in a 1–0 win at Stevenage on 22 February, Anderson also featured in a 0–0 draw with Port Vale on the final day of the season. He was not selected as part of the play-off losing squad.

Anderson became a regular for Peterborough during the 2014–15 season, and scored his first goal for the club in a 3–1 victory over Colchester United on 30 August 2014. After featuring the club's first 21 league fixtures, while also playing in the Football League Trophy, League Cup and FA Cup, Anderson was named on the bench throughout the festive period. He returned to the starting XI in late January, but managed just three appearances before being named on the bench once again. In February, a broken foot ruled Anderson out for the remainder of the season. He made 27 appearances in all competitions throughout the season prior to his injury.

On 12 September 2015, Anderson created his first league assist in a 5–1 victory at Oldham Athletic. The following match saw him given the first dismissal of his career, a straight red card for violent conduct as his team drew 1–1 with Walsall. Anderson appeared to throw a drinks bottle into the crowd.

After serving his suspension, he immediately returned with another assist in a 2–1 win over Swindon Town. On 31 October, Anderson scored and assisted in a 3–2 defeat at Coventry City. Following up his performance with a goal against Fleetwood Town, he then added two goals and an assist in a 5–1 victory at Crewe Alexandra, before being named Football League Young Player of the Month.

On 6 December, Anderson was injured three minutes into an FA Cup tie with Luton Town. The knee injury ended his season and kept Anderson on the sidelines for 177 days.

Anderson made his return with a 45-minute appearance in a 3–2 victory at Rochdale on the opening day of the season, and on 16 August 2016 completed his first 90 minutes of the campaign while making an assist in a 5–1 win over Millwall. After being an unused substitute in the EFL Cup first round win over AFC Wimbledon, Anderson started in the 3–1 second round defeat to Swansea City on 23 August before being substituted on the hour. On 30 August, Anderson captained the team in 6–1 defeat to Norwich City U23s in the EFL Trophy and scored his team's only goal. On 10 September, Anderson suffered knee ligament damage in the first half of a 2–2 draw with Port Vale and was ruled out for the rest of the season.

Anderson joined Peterborough's League One rivals Doncaster Rovers on 24 August 2018 on loan until January 2019.

=== Bradford City ===
Anderson signed for Bradford City in January 2019. In May 2019, following Bradford City's relegation to League Two, he was one of 3 first-team players to be offered a new contract by the club. In June 2019 he signed a new one-year contract with the club.

On 26 May 2020 it was announced that he was one of 10 players who would leave Bradford City when their contract expired on 30 June 2020.

=== Non-league spells ===
On 5 December 2020, Anderson joined Aldershot Town on a short-term deal.

On 3 December 2021, following a long-term injury lay-off, Anderson joined National League side Woking on a deal until the end of the campaign. Anderson signed a new one-year contract extension in June 2022. On 6 May 2025, it was announced that Anderson would leave the club upon the expiry of his contract in June after four years at Woking. He departed having scored 6 goals in 95 appearances.

On 28 June 2025, Anderson joined National League South side Hemel Hempstead Town. On 29 May 2026, it was announced that Anderson would leave Hemel Hempstead Town at the end of his contract in June. He left the club following 9 appearances in all competitions.

== International career ==
On 18 December 2013, Anderson was named in an England under-18 training camp at St George's Park National Football Centre by manager Neil Dewsnip.

== Career statistics ==
As of match played 13 December 2025

Appearances and goals by club, season and competition
Club	Season	League			FA Cup		League Cup		Other		Total	
Club	Season	Division	Apps	Goals	Apps	Goals	Apps	Goals	Apps	Goals	Apps	Goals
Peterborough United	2012–13	Championship	1	0	0	0	0	0	—		1	0
Peterborough United	2013–14	League One	13	0	3	0	1	0	2 (Note: Appearance(s) in Football League Trophy)	0	19	0
Peterborough United	2014–15	League One	24	1	1	0	1	0	1	0	27	1
Peterborough United	2015–16	League One	14	4	2	1	1	1	1	0	18	6
Peterborough United	2016–17	League One	7	0	0	0	1	0	1 (Note: Appearance(s) in EFL Trophy)	1	9	1
Peterborough United	2017–18	League One	17	0	2	0	0	0	4	0	23	0
Peterborough United	2018–19	League One	0	0	0	0	0	0	0	0	0	0
Peterborough United	Total		76	5	8	1	4	1	9	1	97	8
Doncaster Rovers (loan)	2018–19	League One	9	1	0	0	1	0	2	0	12	1
Bradford City (loan)	2018–19	League One	13	1	0	0	0	0	0	0	13	1
Bradford City	2019–20	League Two	5	1	1	0	1	0	2	0	9	1
Aldershot Town	2020–21	National League	31	4	0	0	—		3 (Note: Appearance(s) in FA Trophy)	0	34	4
Woking	2021–22	National League	16	0	0	0	—		0	0	16	0
Woking	2022–23	National League	24	2	1	0	—		0	0	25	2
Woking	2023–24	National League	20	2	0	0	—		0	0	20	2
Woking	2024–25	National League	26	1	0	0	—		8 (Note: Four appearances in FA Trophy; Four appearances in National League Cup)	1	34	2
Woking	Total		86	5	1	0	—		8	1	95	6
Hemel Hempstead Town	2025–26	National League South	6	0	2	0	—		1	0	9	0
Career total			226	17	12	1	6	1	33	2	268	21
