= Michael Smith (footballer, born 1988) =

Northern Irish footballer

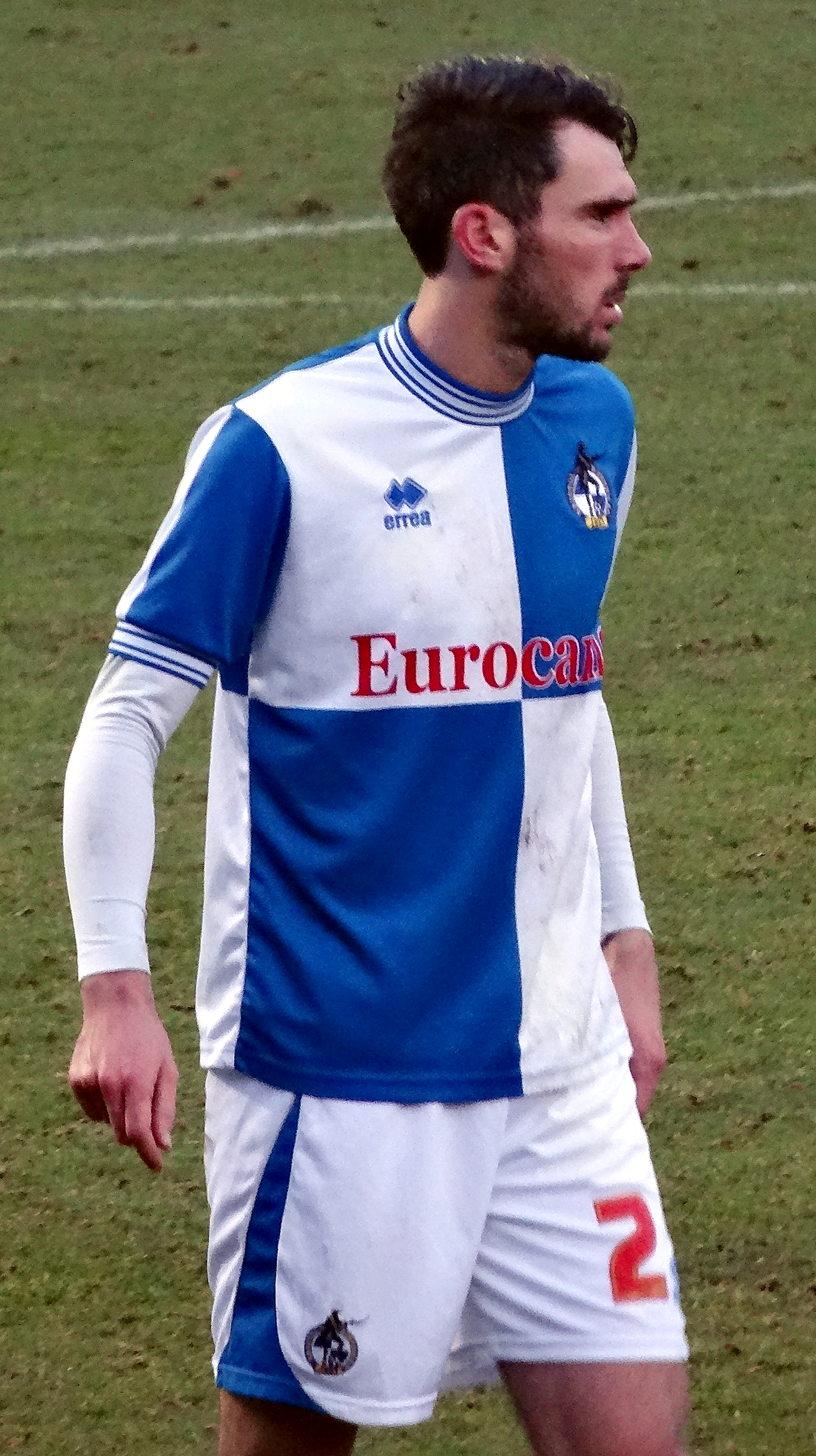
- Smith playing for Bristol Rovers in 2014

Personal information
- Full name: Michael Smith
- Date of birth: 4 September 1988 (age 38)
- Place of birth: Monkstown, Northern Ireland
- Height: 5 ft 11 in (1.80 m)
- Position: Defender

Team information
- Current team: Weston-super-Mare

Youth career
- Greenisland Boys Club

Senior career*
Years	Team	Apps	(Gls)
2005–2009	Ballyclare Comrades		
2009–2011	Ballymena United	86	(5)
2011–2014	Bristol Rovers	101	(1)
2014–2017	Peterborough United	120	(3)
2017–2023	Heart of Midlothian	155	(6)
2023–2025	Yeovil Town	54	(2)
2025–	Weston-super-Mare	33	(0)

International career^{‡}
2016–2021	Northern Ireland	19	(1)
- * Club domestic league appearances and goals as of 21:02, 5 May 2026 (UTC) ‡ National team caps and goals as of 9 September 2021 (UTC)

Michael Smith (born 4 September 1988) is a Northern Irish professional footballer who plays as a defender for National League South club Weston-super-Mare and the Northern Ireland national team. Smith has previously played for Heart of Midlothian in Scotland, Ballyclare Comrades and Ballymena United in Northern Ireland, and Bristol Rovers, Peterborough United and Yeovil Town in England.

At Hearts, Smith was mostly utilised as a right-back – either as a fullback or as a wing-back – however he also deputised as a centre-back (often as the right-most of a back three) when needed.

Smith has received several honours, including the Ballymena United Player of the Year in 2009–10, and Bristol Rovers Player of the Year in 2012–13.

== Club career ==
=== Early career ===
Smith began playing football under the management of his father at Greenisland Boys Club and was picked up by his first senior club, Ballyclare Comrades in 2005. He signed for Irish League side Ballymena United in January 2009, and made over 100 appearances for them before moving to England to join Bristol Rovers in 2011.

=== Bristol Rovers ===
He made his debut on 6 August 2011, in a 3–2 victory away against AFC Wimbledon. He made his home debut on 13 August in a 1–2 defeat to local rivals Torquay United. He scored his first goal for the club in August 2012, opening the scoring in a 3–1 EFL Cup defeat to Ipswich Town.

At the end of the 2012–13 season, he was named the club's Player of the Year before signing a new two-year contract. The 2013–14 season saw Rovers relegated from the Football League for the first time in the club's history, a 1–0 defeat to Mansfield Town sealing their fate on the final day of the season. Despite this, both Smith and teammate John-Joe O'Toole were named in the PFA League Two Team of the Season. Following relegation, he handed in a transfer request.

=== Peterborough United ===
On 25 July 2014, Smith moved to Peterborough United, signing a three-year deal.

=== Heart of Midlothian ===
On 30 June 2017, Michael Smith signed for Hearts in the Scottish Premiership. He signed a two-year deal, wearing the number 2 shirt previously worn by Callum Paterson.

On 7 January 2021, Smith signed an 18-month contract extension. In January 2022 he signed another one-year contract extension to his existing deal. On 25 May 2023, he was announced to be leaving the club at the end of the 2022–23 season.

=== Yeovil Town ===
On 12 September 2023, Smith signed for National League South side Yeovil Town on a one-year deal with an option of an additional year.

Following a successful 2023–24 season that saw Yeovil promoted back to the National League as champions, Smith had a one-year contract extension clause triggered.

Smith departed the club upon the expiration of his contract at the end of the 2024–25 season.

=== Weston-super-Mare ===
On 17 July 2025, Smith joined National League South side Weston-super-Mare having featured for the club as a trialist in pre season.

== International career ==
Smith received his first call-up to the senior Northern Ireland squad on 16 March 2016 for friendlies against Wales and Slovenia. He scored his first international goal on 19 November 2019, in a 6–1 defeat against Germany.

== Career statistics ==
=== Club ===
As of match played 28 April 2026

Appearances and goals by club, season and competition
Club	Season	League			National Cup (Note: Includes Irish Cup, FA Cup, Scottish Cup)		League Cup (Note: Includes Irish League Cup, EFL Cup, Scottish League Cup)		Other		Total	
Club	Season	Division	Apps	Goals	Apps	Goals	Apps	Goals	Apps	Goals	Apps	Goals
Ballymena United	2008–09	IFA Premiership	12	0	0	0	0	0	0	0	12	0
Ballymena United	2009–10	IFA Premiership	37	2	6	1	2	2	3 (Note: Appearance(s) in County Antrim Shield)	0	48	5
Ballymena United	2010–11	IFA Premiership	37	3	2	0	3	1	1	0	43	4
Ballymena United	Total		86	5	8	1	5	3	4	0	103	9
Bristol Rovers	2011–12	League Two	20	0	0	0	2	0	1 (Note: Appearance(s) in the Football League Trophy)	0	23	0
Bristol Rovers	2012–13	League Two	38	1	1	0	1	1	1	0	41	2
Bristol Rovers	2013–14	League Two	43	0	5	0	1	0	1	0	50	0
Bristol Rovers	Total		101	1	6	0	4	1	3	0	114	2
Peterborough United	2014–15	League One	43	1	1	0	1	0	1	0	46	1
Peterborough United	2015–16	League One	38	1	4	0	0	0	1	0	43	1
Peterborough United	2016–17	League One	39	1	4	0	1	0	0	0	44	1
Peterborough United	Total		120	3	9	0	2	0	2	0	133	3
Heart of Midlothian	2017–18	Scottish Premiership	31	0	3	0	4	0	—		38	0
Heart of Midlothian	2018–19	Scottish Premiership	28	0	4	0	6	2	—		38	2
Heart of Midlothian	2019–20	Scottish Premiership	23	0	5	0	7	1	—		35	1
Heart of Midlothian	2020–21	Scottish Championship	25	2	0	0	1	0	—		26	2
Heart of Midlothian	2021–22	Scottish Premiership	20	2	2	0	5	0	—		27	2
Heart of Midlothian	2022–23	Scottish Premiership	28	2	3	0	1	0	7 (Note: Two appearances in UEFA Europa League, five appearances in UEFA Europa Conference League)	0	39	2
Heart of Midlothian	Total		155	6	17	0	24	3	7	0	203	9
Heart of Midlothian B	2022–23	—	—		—		—		1 (Note: Appearance in Scottish Challenge Cup)	0	1	0
Yeovil Town	2023–24	National League South	27	1	5	0	—		0	0	32	1
Yeovil Town	2024–25	National League	27	1	0	0	—		1 (Note: Appearance(s) in FA Trophy)	0	28	1
Yeovil Town	Total		54	2	5	0	—		1	0	60	2
Weston-super-Mare	2025–26	National League South	33	0	7	0	—		3 (Note: Two appearances in FA Trophy, one appearance National League South play-offs)	0	43	0
Career total			549	17	52	1	35	7	21	0	657	25

=== International goals ===
Scores and results Northern Ireland's goal tally first.

No.	Date	Venue	Opponent	Score	Result	Competition
1.	19 November 2019	Waldstadion, Frankfurt, Germany	Germany	1–0	1–6	UEFA Euro 2020 qualification

== Honours ==
Ballyclare Comrades

- Irish League 2nd Division Winner: 2004/05

Heart of Midlothian

- Scottish Cup runner-up: 2018–19, 2019–20, 2021–22
- Scottish Championship: 2020–21

Yeovil Town

- National League South: 2023–24

Individual

- Ballyclare Comrades Young Player of the Year: 2006–07, 2007–08
- Ballymena United Player of the Year: 2009–10
- Ballymena United Players' Player of the Year: 2009–10
- Ballymena United Goal of the Season: 2009–10
- Bristol Rovers Player of the Year: 2012–13
- Bristol Rovers Player of the Year: 2013–14
- PFA Team of the Year: 2013–14 League Two
- PFA Scotland Team of the Year: 2020–21 Scottish Championship
