= Luke James (footballer) =

English footballer

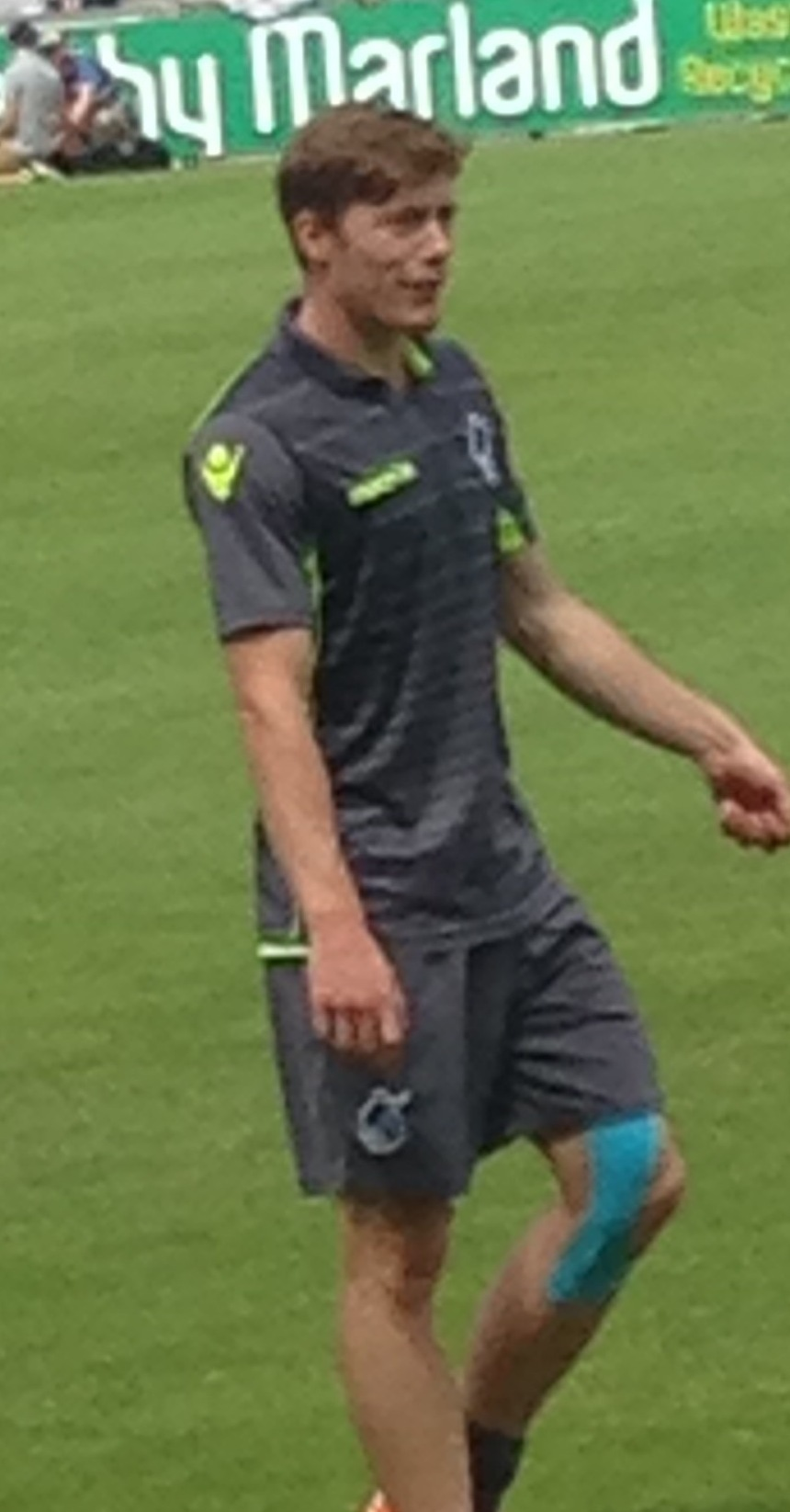
- James at Bristol Rovers in 2016

Personal information
- Full name: Luke Myers James
- Date of birth: 4 November 1994 (age 32)
- Place of birth: Amble, England
- Height: 5 ft 10 in (1.78 m)
- Position: Striker

Team information
- Current team: Morpeth Town

Youth career
- 2010–2011: Hartlepool United

Senior career*
| Years | Team | Apps | (Gls) |
| 2011–2014 | Hartlepool United | 90 | (19) |
| 2014–2017 | Peterborough United | 32 | (1) |
| 2015–2016 | → Bradford City (loan) | 9 | (0) |
| 2016 | → Hartlepool United (loan) | 20 | (1) |
| 2016–2017 | → Bristol Rovers (loan) | 24 | (0) |
| 2017–2018 | Forest Green Rovers | 14 | (0) |
| 2018 | → Barrow (loan) | 17 | (7) |
| 2018–2020 | Hartlepool United | 64 | (7) |
| 2020–2022 | Barrow | 63 | (3) |
| 2022–2023 | York City | 16 | (1) |
| 2023–2025 | South Shields | 17 | (2) |
| 2024 | → Blyth Spartans (loan) | 10 | (1) |
| 2024–2025 | → Morpeth Town (loan) | 41 | (3) |
| 2025– | Morpeth Town | 29 | (3) |

International career^{‡}
| 2019– | England C | 1 | (0) |
- * Club domestic league appearances and goals as of 23:35, 17 May 2026 (UTC) ‡ National team caps and goals as of 22:22, 19 March 2019 (UTC)

Luke Myers James (born 4 November 1994) is an English professional footballer who plays as a forward for Morpeth Town.

James came through the ranks at Hartlepool United, making his debut in December 2011. He currently holds the record of being the youngest player to ever score a league goal for Hartlepool, at the age of 17 years and 64 days. After three seasons at Hartlepool, James put in a transfer request at the start of the 2014–15 season. He signed a four-year deal at Peterborough United for an undisclosed fee. James struggled at Peterborough and joined Bradford City, Hartlepool United and Bristol Rovers on loan before leaving permanently for Forest Green Rovers in 2017. James enjoyed a successful loan spell at National League side Barrow before joining Hartlepool permanently for a third spell. After two seasons with Hartlepool, James failed to agree a new contract and joined League Two Barrow for a second time in 2020. James spent two years at Barrow before leaving for National League side York City. In 2023, James signed for National League North club South Shields.

== Career ==
=== Hartlepool United ===
James was born in the small town of Amble, Northumberland, and grew up supporting local club Sunderland. He joined the academy of Hartlepool United at the age of 11, progressing through their youth system until he was offered a professional contract at the age of 16. James made his league debut for Hartlepool United on 17 December 2011 as a 46th minute substitute for James Brown in a 1–0 defeat by Colchester United. He made his first league starting appearance in a 1–0 win over Oldham Athletic on 26 December 2011, in which he was voted Man of the Match for his performance. He scored his first goal, a 25-yard volley, in a 2–0 win over Rochdale on 7 January 2012. The goal was particularly memorable as it made him the youngest player ever to score for Hartlepool United at the age of 17 years and 64 days, 48 days younger than the previous record holder Steven Istead.

James managed to achieve all this on the pitch whilst also studying for a BTEC qualification in Sport at East Durham College and was subsequently awarded with the honour of being named Apprentice of the Month for December 2011 by the League Football Education committee. James continued his impressive form when he scored a brace in a 4–0 over Carlisle United on 28 January 2012, which would prove to be Hartlepool United's biggest winning margin of the season. As a result of his performance he was named in the Football League Team of the Week. By now the 17-year–old had caught the attention of a number of larger clubs and in his next match, a 0–0 draw against Bournemouth on 11 February 2012, he was watched by 21 scouts. Premier League clubs Newcastle United and Bolton Wanderers and Scottish Premier League side Celtic in particular were all thought to be keen on signing the young midfielder. However, it was later reported on 7 June 2012 that Newcastle United would not be pursuing their interest in the immediate future but would instead be keeping close tabs on James' progress. At the end of his debut season, James had made 19 league appearances and had two of his three goals nominated for Hartlepool United's Goal of the Season Award, with fans ultimately voting for his first Football League goal against Rochdale as the winner.

James maintained his impressive form into the 2012–13 season, making 25 league appearances and scoring 3 league goals, which culminated in him winning the League One Apprentice of the Year Award on 24 March 2013. He dedicated the award to the fans for their continued support despite the fact that the club was facing a relegation battle. Despite his own success, however, he was unable to prevent the club from being relegated from Football League One at the end of the season. At the end of the season, James found himself nominated, for a second consecutive year, for the Hartlepool United Goal of the Season Award for his goal in a 1–1 draw with Brentford on 20 April 2013, however, he ultimately lost out on the fan vote to teammate James Poole. In the close season, James was once again the subject of transfer speculation with Football League Championship sides Crystal Palace, Middlesbrough and Huddersfield Town, as well as League One clubs Brentford and Shrewsbury Town all thought to have been considering a bid for the 18-year–old midfielder, however a formal offer was never made for him.

James began the new season brightly, scoring for Hartlepool United in a 5–0 thrashing of Bradford City in the first round of the 2013–14 Football League Trophy on 3 September 2013. On 21 September 2013 he scored both goals in a 2–2 draw with Bristol Rovers. On 28 September 2013, he made it three goals in two games by scoring in a 3–1 defeat by Oxford United. James scored his 10th league goal for Hartlepool United in a 3–0 away win over Exeter City on 12 October 2013. The following match he secured a league win for Hartlepool United after scoring from long–range in a 1–0 win over Plymouth Argyle on 19 October 2013. James continued his prolific form in a 3–1 win over AFC Wimbledon on 22 October 2013, scoring his sixth league goal in as many matches and securing a fourth consecutive league victory for Hartlepool United. Hartlepool United's run of four wins in five matches (with eleven goals scored and only 3 conceded) did not go unnoticed and in October 2013 the club were given the double honour of having Colin Cooper named League Two Manager of the Month whilst Luke James was awarded League Two Player of the Month by Football League Sponsors Sky Bet. The young forward maintained his impressive season when he scored twice in a 3–2 win over Notts County in the first round of the 2013–14 FA Cup on 9 November 2013.

James was the club's top scorer for the 2013–14 season with 13 leagues goals and 16 in all competitions. This made him the second-youngest Pools player since World War Two to hit double figures in a season. He went on to win Hartlepool's Player of the Year and Players' Player of the Year Award at the end of the 2013–14 season. In August 2014, James submitted two transfer requests, with the media reporting interest from League One club Peterborough United.

=== Peterborough United ===
James signed for Peterborough United on 1 September 2014 for a fee of £500,000.

He moved on loan to Bradford City in July 2015. His loan deal was terminated by Bradford City in January 2016, four months early.

==== Bristol Rovers loan ====
On 6 July 2016, Bristol Rovers signed James on a season long loan from Peterborough United. He scored in pre season with a consolation goal during a 5–1 defeat to the hands of Swansea City. He made his league debut for the club on 14 August 2016, coming off the bench in a 2–1 victory over Oxford United, replacing Billy Bodin in the 66' minute of the game and scored a penalty in the shootout victory against Yeovil Town in the group stage of the EFL Trophy. Having yet to score a league goal for the club, James won a penalty in the 2–1 victory over Chesterfield on 18 March. He blasted it straight down the middle and despite the Chesterfield goalkeeper, Thorsten Stuckmann, moving to his right; he made a superb reflex save to deny James his first goal for the club.

=== Forest Green Rovers ===
On 13 July 2017, James signed for League Two club Forest Green Rovers on a free transfer, signing a two-year contract. He scored his first goal for Forest Green in an EFL Trophy tie against Newport County on 29 August 2017.

=== Hartlepool United ===
On 13 July 2018, James re-joined National League side Hartlepool United for the third time. James completed 11 assists for his side in the 2018–19 season. At the end of the 2018–19 season, James was chosen as the Fans' Player of the Year.

=== Barrow ===
In July 2020, James re-joined newly promoted League Two side Barrow after failing to agree a new contract at Hartlepool. He left Barrow after two seasons with the club.

=== York City ===
In July 2022, James signed for newly promoted team York City. He was released by the club after one season.

=== South Shields ===
On 13 June 2023, James signed for newly promoted National League North side South Shields. In March 2024, James moved on loan to fellow National League North side Blyth Spartans on loan until the end of the season.

On 15 June 2024, James joined Northern Premier League Premier Division side Morpeth Town on a season-long loan deal.

He was released by South Shields at the end of the 2024–25 season.

=== Morpeth Town ===
Following his departure from South Shields, James joined Morpeth Town permanently in June 2025 on a two-year deal. The move also saw him take up a coaching role in the club's academy.

== Career statistics ==
As of end of 2025–26 season

Appearances and goals by club, season and competition
| Club | Season | League | | | FA Cup | | League Cup | | Other | | Total | |
| Club | Season | Division | Apps | Goals | Apps | Goals | Apps | Goals | Apps | Goals | Apps | Goals |
|---|---|---|---|---|---|---|---|---|---|---|---|---|
| Hartlepool United | 2011–12 | League One | 19 | 3 | 0 | 0 | 0 | 0 | 0 | 0 | 19 | 3 |
| Hartlepool United | 2012–13 | League One | 25 | 3 | 0 | 0 | 1 | 0 | 0 | 0 | 26 | 3 |
| Hartlepool United | 2013–14 | League Two | 42 | 13 | 3 | 2 | 1 | 0 | 3 (Note: Appearance(s) in Football League Trophy) | 1 | 49 | 16 |
| Hartlepool United | 2014–15 | League Two | 4 | 0 | 0 | 0 | 1 | 0 | 0 | 0 | 5 | 0 |
| Hartlepool United | Total | | 90 | 19 | 3 | 2 | 3 | 0 | 3 | 1 | 99 | 22 |
| Peterborough United | 2014–15 | League One | 32 | 1 | 1 | 0 | 0 | 0 | 1 | 1 | 34 | 2 |
| Bradford City (loan) | 2015–16 | League One | 9 | 0 | 3 | 0 | 1 | 0 | 1 | 0 | 14 | 0 |
| Hartlepool United (loan) | 2015–16 | League Two | 20 | 1 | 0 | 0 | 0 | 0 | 0 | 0 | 20 | 1 |
| Bristol Rovers (loan) | 2016–17 | League One | 24 | 0 | 3 | 0 | 1 | 0 | 2 (Note: Appearance(s) in EFL Trophy) | 0 | 30 | 0 |
| Forest Green Rovers | 2017–18 | League Two | 14 | 0 | 2 | 0 | 1 | 0 | 5 | 1 | 22 | 1 |
| Barrow (loan) | 2017–18 | National League | 17 | 7 | 0 | 0 | 0 | 0 | 0 | 0 | 17 | 7 |
| Hartlepool United | 2018–19 | National League | 45 | 5 | 3 | 0 | 0 | 0 | 2 (Note: Appearance(s) in FA Trophy) | 0 | 50 | 5 |
| Hartlepool United | 2019–20 | National League | 19 | 2 | 4 | 1 | 0 | 0 | 0 | 0 | 23 | 3 |
| Hartlepool United | Total | | 64 | 7 | 7 | 1 | 0 | 0 | 2 | 0 | 73 | 8 |
| Barrow | 2020–21 | League Two | 44 | 3 | 1 | 0 | 0 | 0 | 2 | 0 | 47 | 3 |
| Barrow | 2021–22 | League Two | 19 | 0 | 2 | 0 | 0 | 0 | 1 | 0 | 22 | 0 |
| Barrow | Total | | 63 | 3 | 3 | 0 | 0 | 0 | 3 | 0 | 69 | 3 |
| York City | 2022–23 | National League | 16 | 1 | 2 | 0 | — | | 1 | 0 | 19 | 1 |
| South Shields | 2023–24 | National League North | 17 | 2 | 1 | 0 | — | | 1 | 0 | 19 | 2 |
| Blyth Spartans (loan) | 2023–24 | National League North | 10 | 1 | 0 | 0 | — | | 0 | 0 | 10 | 1 |
| Morpeth Town | 2024–25 | NPL Premier Division | 41 | 3 | 2 | 2 | — | | 3 (Note: One appearance in FA Trophy, two appearances in Northumberland Senior Cup) | 0 | 46 | 5 |
| Morpeth Town | 2025–26 | NPL Premier Division | 29 | 3 | 3 | 2 | — | | 2 | 0 | 34 | 5 |
| Morpeth Town | Total | | 70 | 6 | 5 | 4 | 0 | 0 | 5 | 0 | 80 | 10 |
| Career total | | | 446 | 48 | 30 | 7 | 6 | 0 | 24 | 3 | 506 | 58 |

== Honours ==
Individual

- League Football Education Apprentice of the Month: December 2011
- Football League One Apprentice of the Year: 2013
- Football League Two Player of the Month: October 2013
- Hartlepool United Player of the Year: 2013–14, 2018–19
- Hartlepool United Players' Player of the Year: 2013–14
