= Dave Robertson (football manager) =

English football manager

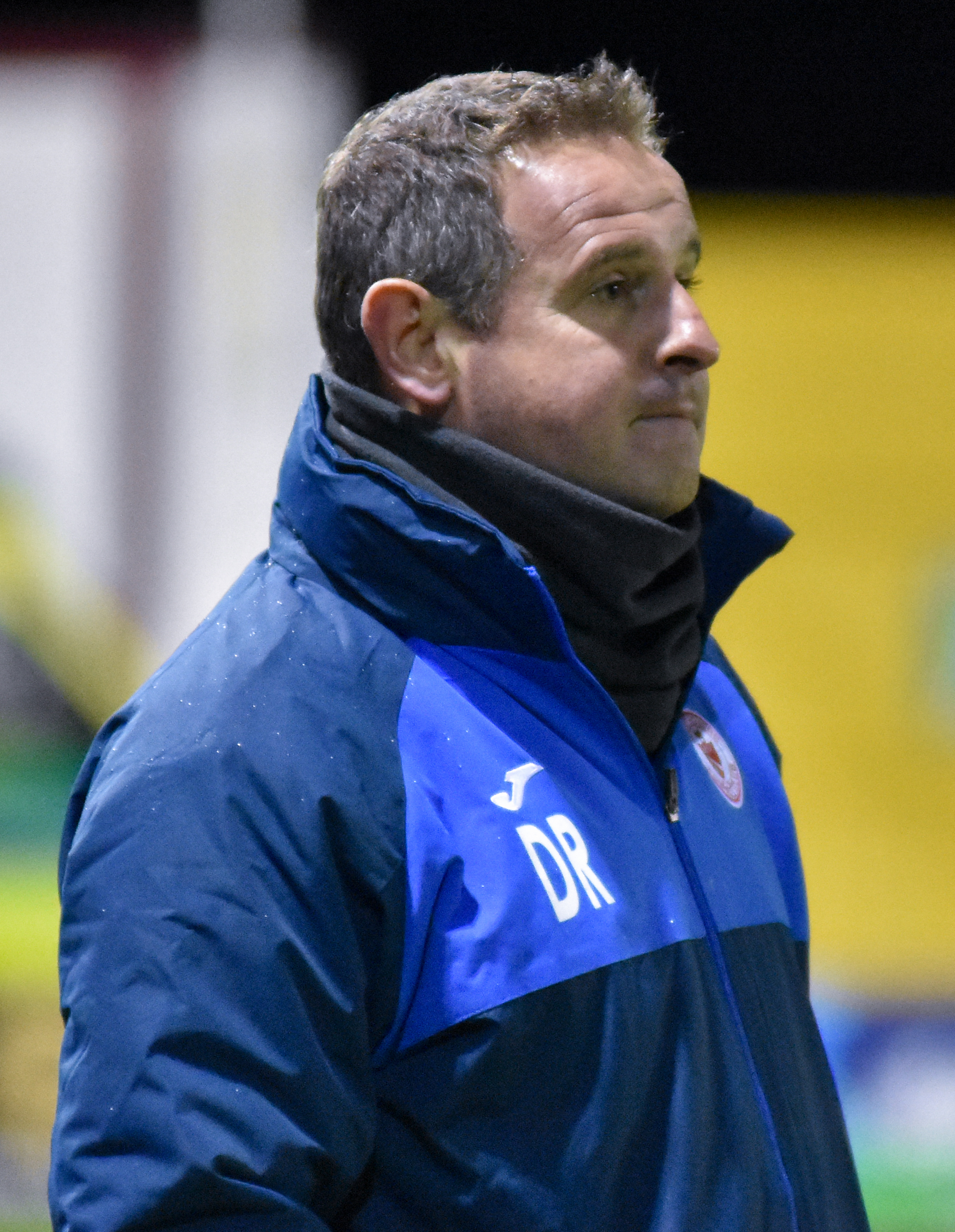
- Robertson in 2017

Personal information
- Date of birth: 19 November 1973 (age 53)
- Place of birth: Dagenham, England
- Position: Winger

Youth career
- Years: Team
- Dagenham United

Managerial career
- 2015: Peterborough United (caretaker)
- 2015: Peterborough United
- 2015: Southend United (under 21s)
- 2015–2017: Sligo Rovers

Dave Robertson (born 19 November 1973) is a football manager and coach who was most recently the manager of League of Ireland Premier Division side Sligo Rovers until April 2017. Before this he was manager of Peterborough United.

== Early life and military career ==
Robertson was born in Dagenham, London. He grew up as a West Ham United supporter, and aged six, was a mascot at a match against Preston North End, walking alongside Trevor Brooking. As a young boy, he played as a winger for Dagenham United, as well as the Barking & Dagenham District and Essex County teams. He had trials at several top clubs in London, with Chelsea being the last to take an interest. He had intended to try and win a youth team place at a Football League club before the age of 16, but ultimately, he did not sign a contract with any football team.

Robertson joined the Royal Marines, for whom his father and grandfather also served. He earned the coveted green beret after completing the commando tests and was drafted to 40 Commando RM age 17. His first tour of duty was to Kuwait for three months, towards the end of the first Gulf War. Soon afterwards, he completed his arctic warfare training in Norway, and his jungle training in Guyana. In late 1993, Robertson began his first tour of duty to Northern Ireland for six months, settling in West Belfast. He returned there for another six months in late 1994 after being drafted to 45 Commando RM. Whilst in his mid-twenties, he caught a viral infection which caused minor damage to his heart. He had a pacemaker fitted and was medically discharged from the Marines in 1998.

== Coaching and managerial career ==
During Robertson's time with the Marines, he had agreed to do a week's coaching course in Portsmouth. From then on he was hooked, and his first coaching job came at Peterborough United, where he spent two years. He then worked in the United States for a year, before moving back to England to a job at Crystal Palace. In 2003, after completing his UEFA A licence he returned to Peterborough United to be involved with the academy and youth team set up, followed by the completion of his UEFA Pro licence in 2013 with the English FA. Robertson remained as the Academy Manager of Peterborough United where he stayed until the sacking of Darren Ferguson on 21 February 2015.

He was appointed as caretaker-manager of the club, winning his first game in charge; a 2-0 home win against Bradford City on 28 February 2015. After wins against Sheffield United and Leyton Orient, Robertson became only the second ever Posh manager to win his first three games in charge, after Norman Rigby did so in 1967. In May 2015, Robertson was appointed manager of Peterborough, signing a three-year contract. Following a poor start to the 2015–16 season with only one win in the first six games of the season Robertson was sacked on 6 September 2015. On 25 September 2015, Robertson was appointed the Under-21 manager at Southend United.

On 19 November 2015 he was announced as the new manager of League of Ireland Premier Division side Sligo Rovers beginning in January 2016.

== Managerial statistics ==
As of 30 June 2017

Managerial record by team and tenure
Team	Nat	From	To	Record							
Team	Nat	From	To	G	W	D	L	GF	GA	GD	Win %
Peterborough United (caretaker)	(England)	21 February 2015	22 May 2015	14	6	4	4	15	13	+2	42.86
Peterborough United	(England)	22 May 2015	6 September 2015	9	2	1	6	9	16	−7	22.22
Sligo Rovers	(Republic of Ireland)	19 November 2015	5 April 2017	36	14	10	12	46	39	+7	38.89
Total				59	22	15	22	70	68	+2	37.29
