= Danny Lloyd (footballer) =

English footballer (born 1991)

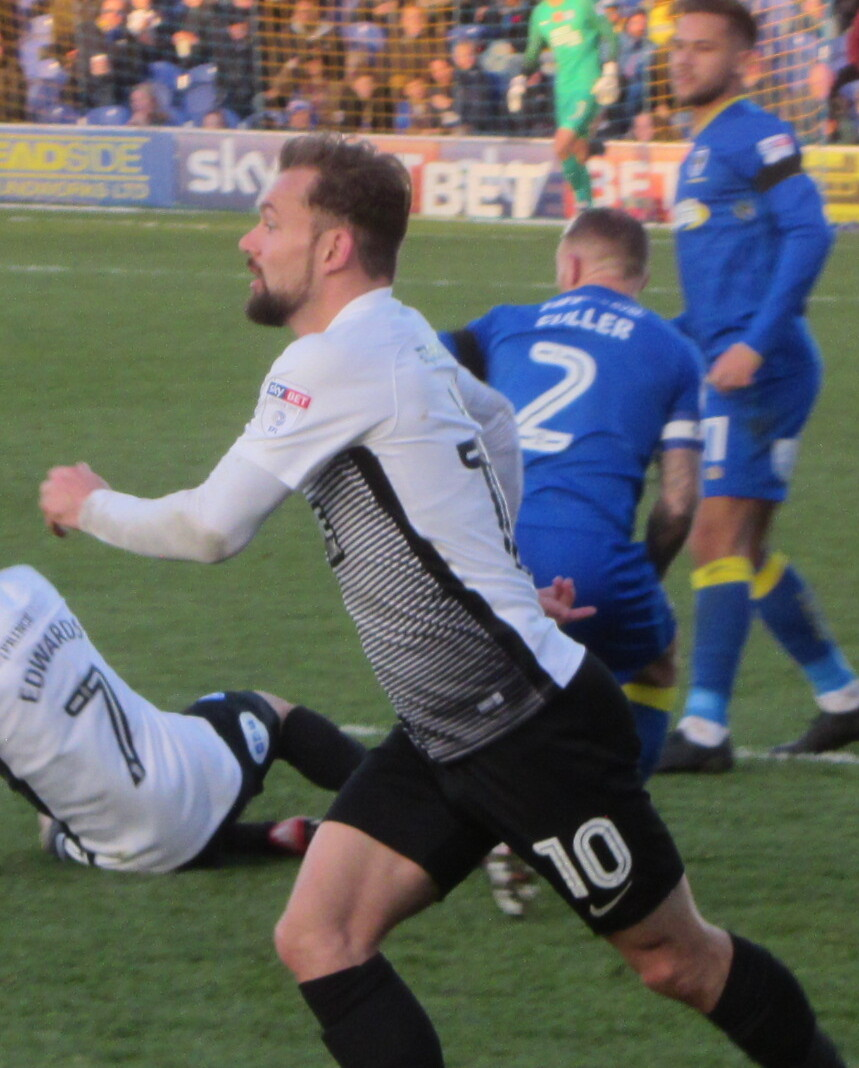
- Lloyd playing for Peterborough United in November 2017

Personal information
- Full name: Daniel James Lloyd-McGoldrick
- Date of birth: 3 December 1991 (age 34)
- Place of birth: Liverpool, England
- Height: 5 ft 8 in (1.73 m)
- Position: Midfielder

Team information
- Current team: Southport
- Number: 7

Youth career
- –2009: Southport

Senior career*
Years	Team	Apps	(Gls)
2009–2011	Southport	5	(0)
2009–2010	→ Chorley (loan)		
2010	→ Skelmersdale United (loan)		
2011–2012	Colwyn Bay	19	(5)
2012	Lincoln City	12	(3)
2012–2013	Colwyn Bay	16	(3)
2013	Tamworth	15	(2)
2013–2016	AFC Fylde (Note: The AFC Fylde appearances and goals only cover the 2014–15 to 2015–16 seasons.)	80	(20)
2016–2017	Stockport County	41	(22)
2017–2018	Peterborough United	31	(8)
2018–2020	Salford City	39	(5)
2020	→ Stockport County (loan)	8	(1)
2020–2021	Tranmere Rovers	31	(3)
2021–2022	Gillingham	27	(5)
2022–2023	Rochdale	24	(6)
2023	Livingston	4	(0)
2024–	Southport	53	(15)
- * Club domestic league appearances and goals as of 08:18, 26 November 2025 (UTC)

Danny James Lloyd-McGoldrick (born 3 December 1991) is an English professional footballer who plays as a midfielder for National League North side Southport.

After beginning his career with Southport, he played for Colwyn Bay, Lincoln City, Tamworth and AFC Fylde. In 2016, he joined Stockport County and enjoyed a prolific season in the National League North. His form attracted interest from several Football League clubs and he signed for Peterborough United, making his professional debut in August 2017, before moving to Salford City.

== Career ==
=== Non-league ===
Born in Liverpool, Lloyd began his career with Southport, progressing through the club's youth ranks before being handed his senior debut on 8 September 2009 in a 4–2 victory over Stafford Rangers. He later spent time on loan with Chorley and Skelmersdale United.

He was released by Southport at the end of the 2010–11 season and joined Colwyn Bay. He moved to Lincoln City in January 2012, scoring three times in twelve appearances, but was unable to agree an extension to his contract with manager David Holdsworth at the end of the season and subsequently rejoined Colwyn Bay. His contract with Colwyn included a clause that he could cancel his stay at any time if he received an offer from a Conference Premier side. This clause was activated in January 2013 when Lloyd signed for Tamworth where he played until July 2013.

Following his release from Tamworth, Lloyd signed for AFC Fylde, helping the club gain promotion to the Conference North via the play-offs in his first season after finishing the season as the club's joint top goalscorer. He remained with Fylde for two further seasons before leaving in 2016 after becoming frustrated with his lack of appearances. Lloyd later stated that he became disillusioned with football after leaving Fylde and came close to retiring.

=== Peterborough United ===
At the end of the 2016–17 season, following the expiration of his Stockport contract, Lloyd signed for League One side Peterborough United on a three-year contract. After joining the club, Lloyd left his job as a business development manager for waste management company Biffa where he sold bins. He made his professional debut for the club on the opening day of the 2017–18 season as a substitute in place of Marcus Maddison during a 2–1 victory over Plymouth Argyle.

He scored his first goal for the club in an EFL Cup match against Northampton Town on 3 October 2017. He scored his first league goal one month later in a 2–2 draw with AFC Wimbledon and, in the club's following match, he scored a hat-trick in a 5–0 victory over Tranmere Rovers in the FA Cup. However, after struggling to establish himself in the first-team, Lloyd was placed on the transfer list after talks were held between his agent and the club.

=== Salford City ===
In July 2018, he joined National League side Salford City on a three-year deal. He made his debut in the opening match of the 2018–19 season on 4 August as Salford drew 1–1 at home to Leyton Orient. He scored his first goal for the club on 27 August when he scored a penalty in a 3–1 victory against Barrow. On 1 September, he was sent off for two bookable offences in the first half of a 0–0 draw with Dagenham & Redbridge. During the season he played 35 times for the club (including five appearances in cup games), scoring three times. On 7 September 2019, he scored what would be his final goals for Salford when he bagged a brace against Morecambe.

In January 2020 he rejoined former club Stockport County on loan until the end of the season. He made his second début for the club in a 2–0 defeat to Hartlepool United on 25 January. He scored one goal in his second spell, scoring the opening goal of a 1–1 with Woking on 22 February.

Ahead of the 2020–21 season it was announced that he had left Salford City by mutual consent.

=== Tranmere Rovers ===
On 10 November 2020, Lloyd joined League Two side Tranmere Rovers on a short-term contract. He made his debut on 11 November 2020 in an EFL Trophy tie against Wigan Athletic. His first goal followed in the same competition in a 2-1 win over Manchester City U21s on 8 December 2020.

=== Gillingham ===
On 6 July 2021, Lloyd joined League One side Gillingham, having rejected an offer to remain at Tranmere. Lloyd was released after one season at the club following their relegation to League Two.

=== Rochdale ===
On 9 December 2022, he signed a one-month contract with League Two side Rochdale. On 9 January 2023 his contracted was extended until the end of the season.

=== Livingston ===
In August 2023, Lloyd joined Scottish Premiership club Livingston. After just five appearances, Lloyd was released upon expiry of his short-term contract.

=== Southport ===
On 8 February 2024, Lloyd returned to his first club Southport, twelve years after he left the club the first time. On 9 July 2026, Lloyd was named club captain for the 2026-27 National League North season.

== Career statistics ==
As of 9 February 2024

Appearances and goals by club, season and competition
Club	Season	League			FA Cup		League Cup (Note: Includes appearances in EFL Cup and Scottish League Cup)		Other		Total	
Club	Season	Division	Apps	Goals	Apps	Goals	Apps	Goals	Apps	Goals	Apps	Goals
Southport	2009–10	Conference North	1	0	0	0	—		0	0	1	0
Southport	2010–11	Conference Premier	4	0	0	0	—		0	0	4	0
Southport	Total		5	0	0	0	—		0	0	5	0
Colwyn Bay	2011–12	Conference North	19	5	1	0	—		3 (Note: Appearances in FA Trophy)	0	23	5
Lincoln City	2011–12	Conference Premier	12	3	—		—		—		12	3
Colwyn Bay	2012–13	Conference North	16	3	3	1	—		1	0	20	4
Tamworth	2012–13	Conference Premier	15	2	—		—		—		15	2
AFC Fylde	2014–15	Conference North	40	15	4	1	—		6 (Note: Two appearances in Conference North play-offs, four appearances and two goals in FA Trophy)	2	50	18
AFC Fylde	2015–16	National League North	40	5	4	2	—		8 (Note: Three appearances in National League North play-offs, five appearances and four goals in FA Trophy)	4	52	11
AFC Fylde	Total		80	20	8	3	—		14	6	102	29
Stockport County	2016–17	National League North	41	22	4	4	—		4	3	49	29
Peterborough United	2017–18	League One	27	8	4	3	1	0	5 (Note: Appearances in EFL Trophy)	2	37	13
Salford City	2018–19	National League	30	3	3	0	—		2 (Note: Appearance(s) in FA Trophy)	0	35	3
Salford City	2019–20	League Two	9	2	0	0	1	0	4	1	14	3
Salford City	Total		39	5	3	0	1	0	6	1	49	6
Stockport County (loan)	2019–20	National League	8	1	—		—		0	0	8	1
Tranmere Rovers	2020–21	League Two	31	3	1	0	0	0	7 (Note: 6 appearances and 4 goals in EFL Trophy and one appearance in EFL League Two play-offs)	4	39	7
Gillingham	2021–22	League One	27	5	2	0	2	0	3	0	34	5
Rochdale	2022–23	League Two	25	6	0	0	0	0	0	0	25	6
Livingston	2023–24	Scottish Premiership	4	0	0	0	1	0	0	0	5	0
Career total			349	83	26	11	5	0	43	16	423	110

== Honours ==
Tranmere Rovers

- EFL Trophy runner-up: 2020–21
