= Idris Kanu =

Sierra Leone international footballer (born 1999)

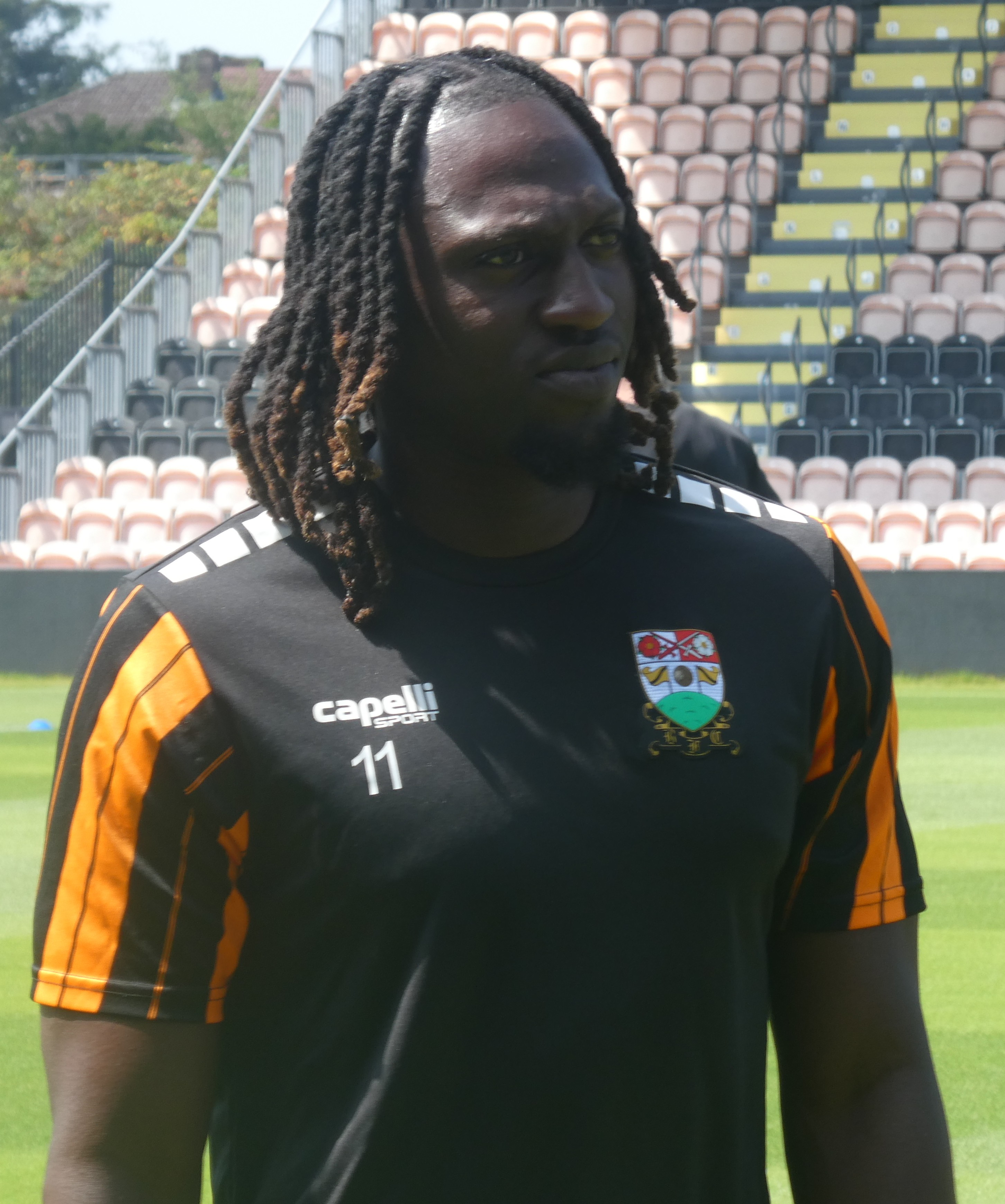
- Kanu in 2026

Personal information
- Full name: Idris Sheka Kanu
- Date of birth: 5 December 1999 (age 26)
- Place of birth: London, England
- Height: 1.82 m (5 ft 11 1/2 in)
- Positions: Wing-back; winger

Team information
- Current team: Barnet
- Number: 11

Youth career
- 2010–2016: West Ham United

Senior career*
Years	Team	Apps	(Gls)
2016–2017	Aldershot Town	29	(3)
2017–2022	Peterborough United	46	(2)
2018–2019	→ Port Vale (loan)	3	(1)
2019	→ Boreham Wood (loan)	18	(4)
2022	→ Northampton Town (loan)	6	(0)
2022–	Barnet	160	(21)

International career^{‡}
2021–	Sierra Leone	9	(0)
- * Club domestic league appearances and goals as of 19:12, 19 September 2026 (UTC) ‡ National team caps and goals as of 14:25, 21 November 2026 (UTC)

Idris Sheka Kanu (born 5 December 1999) is a professional footballer who plays as a wing-back or winger for EFL League Two club Barnet. Born in England, he represents the Sierra Leone national team.

Kanu began playing football with West Ham United at 11 and spent six years with the club. He signed for Aldershot Town in October 2016 and, at the age of 16, became the club's youngest-ever player and goalscorer in league competitions. He joined Peterborough United for an undisclosed fee in August 2017, from where he was loaned out to Port Vale for the first half of the 2018–19 season and then Boreham Wood in the latter half of the season. He helped Peterborough to win promotion out of League One at the end of the 2020–21 season. He was loaned to Northampton Town in January 2022 and sold to Barnet in September 2022. He won the National League title with Barnet in the 2024–25 campaign.

== Club career ==
=== Early career ===
Kanu was recruited into the West Ham United academy at the age of 11 after impressing in a trial game for Barking and Dagenham district. He appeared for the "Hammers" Under-21 team at the age of 15. In September 2016, following his release from West Ham, he underwent a trial with Manchester United's Under-18 side and scored twice in a match against Middlesbrough. A permanent move failed to materialize, however, and Kanu later revealed he rejected an offer from the Premier League club in order to play senior football regularly.

=== Aldershot Town ===
On 7 October 2016, National League side Aldershot Town completed the signing of Kanu on an amateur contract after he had impressed during training sessions with the club. Upon signing, he was reunited with James Rowe, the club's assistant manager who he had previously worked with at West Ham. He made his debut the following day, coming on as a late substitute for Bernard Mensah in a 2–0 win over Solihull Moors at the Recreation Ground. In doing so, at the age of 16 years and 308 days, Kanu became the youngest player ever to feature for the "Shots" in a league match. He scored his first professional goal in the following match, netting in a 2–1 FA Cup defeat at home to Eastbourne Borough. Kanu's first league goal came on 12 November when he scored the opening goal in a 3–3 draw at Lincoln City. Upon scoring, Kanu broke another record by becoming the club's youngest ever goalscorer in league competition, aged 16 years and 343 days. On 5 December, he signed his first professional contract with the club on his 17th birthday, signing a two-and-a-half-year deal. He received his first ever red card the following year, when he was dismissed for two bookable offences in a 1–0 win over Dover Athletic on 17 April. Kanu ultimately scored five goals in 33 appearances across all competitions as Gary Waddock's side fell just short of promotion at the end of the 2016–17 season, losing out to Tranmere Rovers in the play-off semi-finals.

=== Peterborough United ===
On 1 August 2017, Kanu signed a three-year deal with League One side Peterborough United for an undisclosed fee. He made his English Football League debut for the club on 5 August, coming on as a second-half substitute for Junior Morias in a 2–1 win over Plymouth Argyle at London Road. Speaking at the end of the month, Peterborough manager Grant McCann said that he was very pleased with Kanu's progress. However, McCann was sacked and replaced by Steve Evans in February 2018 and Kanu had to wait until the last day of the 2017–18 season to make his first start, featuring in a 2–0 defeat at Portsmouth. Kanu made a total of 28 appearances during the campaign and Evans later announced that he would be made available to leave the club on loan the following season. Kanu scored his first goal for Peterborough in a 2–0 win over Northampton Town in an EFL Trophy tie on 3 September 2019.

On 28 June 2018, Kanu joined League Two side Port Vale on a season-long loan deal. On 29 September, he came off the bench to make his first league appearance at Vale Park and scored his first-ever goal in the Football League with a header seven minutes into injury-time to secure a 1–1 draw with Exeter City. However, he started just three games. He made a further four substitute appearances thereafter and was recalled to Peterborough on 3 January 2019.

On 4 January 2019, Kanu joined National League side Boreham Wood on a "long-term" loan deal; "Wood" manager Luke Garrard said that he was "very excited" to bring Kanu to Meadow Park. He made his debut the following day, opening the scoring in a 4–4 draw at Dagenham & Redbridge. He ended the 2018–19 season with four goals in 19 appearances for Boreham Wood.

He signed a new deal with Peterborough on 7 February 2020, which would keep him at the club until summer 2023; manager Darren Ferguson said, "I think he's got potential, so it's important we tied him down." He scored one goal in ten games during the 2019–20 season, which was ended early due to the COVID-19 pandemic in England, and was one of ten players to be taken off furlough in order to take part in one-on-one training with Ferguson. He scored his first goal for Peterborough on 27 March 2021, in a 7–0 thrashing of Accrington Stanley. He scored two goals in 25 games in the 2020–21 season as Peterborough secured promotion into the Championship with automatic promotion out of League One.

On 26 January 2022, Kanu joined League Two side Northampton Town on loan until the end of the 2021–22 season, having just returned from the Africa Cup of Nations. He started just one league game under Jon Brady, but did make five substitute appearances and started in the play-off semi-final first leg 2–1 defeat at Mansfield Town. He was an unused substitute in the return fixture at Sixfields Stadium, as the "Cobblers" lost the tie 3–1 on aggregate. Upon returning to Peterborough, he was transfer-listed by new manager Grant McCann.

=== Barnet ===
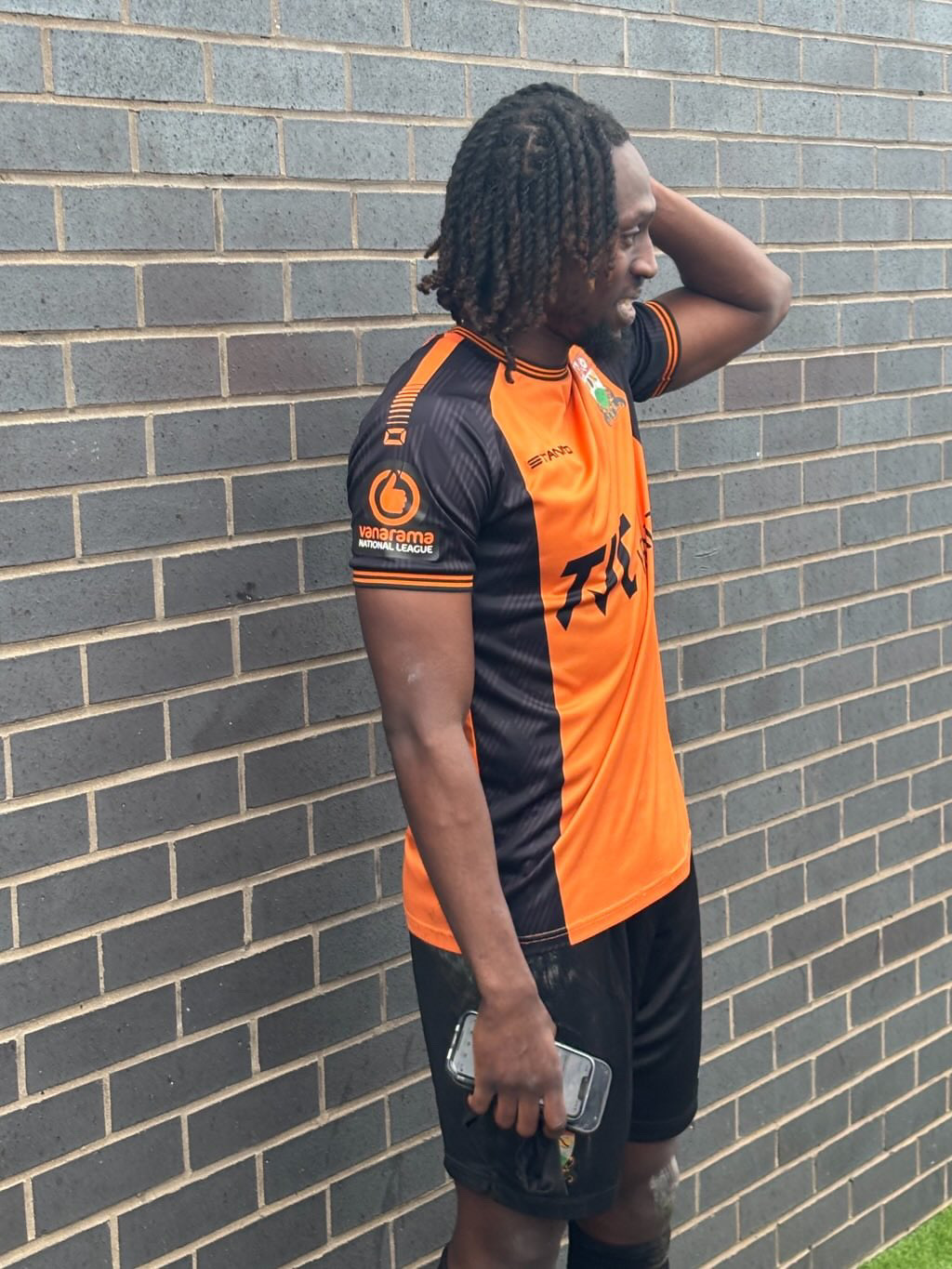
Kanu in Barnet colours in 2025.

On 1 September 2022, Kanu signed a two-year contract with National League club Barnet for an undisclosed fee. He earned praise from Peterborough chairman Darragh MacAnthony for taking a paycut from his £1,700 per week salary in order to play regular football with Barnet. Kanu put Barnet into the second round of the FA Cup with a headed goal in the first round replay at Chelmsford City on 14 November. Kanu was named the BFC Supporters' Association Player of the Month for November. He scored eight goals in 37 league games in the 2022–23 season, helping the club to qualify for the play-offs with a fifth-place finish. They were beaten by Boreham Wood at The Hive Stadium at the quarter-final stage, in a game where Kanu had a header cleared off the goalmouth.

In January 2025, Barnet rejected bids for Kanu from League Two clubs Carlisle United and Bromley as manager Andy Woodman wanted to keep Barnet in the title race. He remained to play 38 league games in the 2024–25 season as Barnet won promotion back to the EFL as champions of the National League. He went on to sign a new contract with the club. He was named as BFC Supporters' Association Player of the Month for August 2025. He made five key passes, one assist, and four tackles in a 3–0 win over Grimsby Town on 20 September, securing himself a place in the EFL Team of the Week. He was again in the Team of the Week for a dominant attacking display, which included a goal and an assist, in a 3–1 win at Walsall on 7 February. He featured 47 times in the 2025–26 campaign, scoring two goals.

== International career ==
Kanu was eligible to represent England as his country of birth, as well as Sierra Leone through his parental lineage. He received his first call up to the Sierra Leone national team for an Africa Cup of Nations qualifying game against Benin in June 2021. On 13 November 2021, Kanu made his debut for Sierra Leone, playing in a 2–0 loss against the Comoros. In December 2021, Kanu was named in the Sierra Leone squad for the delayed 2021 Africa Cup of Nations. Sierra Leone did not advance past the group stages after finishing third in Group E and Kanu was not named in any matchday squads.

== Personal life ==
Kanu is a practising Muslim and fasts during Ramadan.

== Career statistics ==
=== Club ===
As of 19 September 2026

Appearances and goals by club, season and competition
Club	Season	League			FA Cup		EFL Cup		Other		Total	
Club	Season	League	Apps	Goals	Apps	Goals	Apps	Goals	Apps	Goals	Apps	Goals
Aldershot Town	2016–17	National League	29	3	1	1	—		3 (Note: 2 appearances in play-offs and 1 appearance in FA Trophy.)	0	33	4
Peterborough United	2017–18	League One	18	0	3	0	1	0	6 (Note: Appearance(s) in EFL Trophy.)	0	28	0
Peterborough United	2018–19	League One	0	0	0	0	0	0	0	0	0	0
Peterborough United	2019–20	League One	6	0	0	0	0	0	4	1	10	1
Peterborough United	2020–21	League One	17	2	1	0	1	0	6	0	25	2
Peterborough United	2021–22	Championship	5	0	0	0	1	0	—		6	0
Peterborough United	2022–23	League One	0	0	0	0	0	0	0	0	0	0
Peterborough United	Total		46	2	4	0	3	0	16	1	69	3
Port Vale (loan)	2018–19	League Two	3	1	0	0	1	0	3	0	7	1
Boreham Wood (loan)	2018–19	National League	18	4	—		—		1 (Note: Appearance(s) in FA Trophy)	0	19	4
Northampton Town (loan)	2021–22	League Two	6	0	—		—		1 (Note: Appearance(s) in play-offs.)	0	7	0
Barnet	2022–23	National League	37	8	4	2	—		5 (Note: 4 appearances in FA Trophy and 1 appearance in the play-offs.)	0	46	10
Barnet	2023–24	National League	33	7	4	0	—		3 (Note: 1 appearance in FA Trophy, and 1 appearance in the play-offs.)	0	40	7
Barnet	2024–25	National League	38	2	2	0	—		1	0	41	2
Barnet	2025–26	League Two	45	2	1	0	1	0	0	0	47	2
Barnet	2026–27	League Two	7	2	0	0	1	0	0	0	8	2
Barnet	Total		160	21	11	2	2	0	9	0	182	23
Career total			262	31	16	3	6	0	33	1	318	35

=== International ===
As of match played 17 November 2026

Appearances and goals by national team and year
National team	Year	Apps	Goals
Sierra Leone	2021	1	0
Sierra Leone	2022	1	0
Sierra Leone	2026	7	0
Total		9	0

== Honours ==
Peterborough United

- EFL League One second-place promotion: 2020–21

Barnet

- National League: 2024–25
