= 2017–18 Peterborough United F.C. season =

Peterborough United
2017–18 season
- Chairman: Darragh MacAnthony
- Manager: Grant McCann (until 25 February 2018); David Oldfield (25–28 February 2018; caretaker); Steve Evans (from 28 February 2018)
- Stadium: London Road Stadium
- League One: 9th
- FA Cup: Fourth round
- EFL Cup: First round
- EFL Trophy: Quarter-final
- Top goalscorer: League: Jack Marriott (27); All: Jack Marriott (33)
- Highest home attendance: 13,193
- Lowest home attendance: 1,707
- Average home league attendance: 5,580
Home colours	Away colours	Third colours

The 2017–18 season was Peterborough United's 58th year in the Football League and their fifth consecutive season in the third tier, League One. Along with League One, the club also participated in the FA Cup, EFL Cup and EFL Trophy. The season covered the period from 1 July 2017 to 30 June 2018.

== Squad ==
No.	Name	Pos.	Nat.	Place of Birth	Age	Apps	Goals	Signed from	Date signed	Fee	Ends
Goalkeepers
1	Jonathan Bond	GK	(England)	Hemel Hempstead	25	44	0	Reading	1 July 2017	Loan	2017
24	Josh Tibbetts	GK	(England)	Stourbridge	19	0	0	Birmingham City	1 July 2017	Free	2019
25	Conor O'Malley	GK	(Republic of Ireland)	Westport	23	14	0	St Patrick's Athletic	7 August 2017	Undisclosed	Undisclosed
Defenders
2	Liam Shephard	RB	(Wales)	Pentre	23	29	0	Swansea City	10 July 2017	Free	2019
3	Andrew Hughes	LB	(Wales)	Cardiff	26	101	4	Newport County	1 July 2016	Free	2019
5	Ryan Tafazolli	CB	(Iran) (England)	Sutton	26	85	6	Mansfield Town	6 June 2016	Free	2019
6	Jack Baldwin	CB	(England)	Barking	25	118	5	Hartlepool United	31 January 2014	£500,000	2019
17	Alex Penny	CB	(Wales)	Nuneaton	20	11	0	Nuneaton Town	19 July 2017	£50,000	2020
27	Steven Taylor	CB	(England)	Greenwich	32	51	4	Ipswich Town	25 July 2017	Free	2019
32	Lewis Freestone	LB	(England)	King's Lynn	18	8	0	Academy	30 July 2016	Trainee	2019
Midfielders
7	Gwion Edwards	RW	(Wales)	Lampeter	25	75	16	Crawley Town	24 June 2016	Free	2019
8	Christopher Forrester	DM	(Republic of Ireland)	Dublin	25	129	6	St Patrick's Athletic	29 August 2015	Undisclosed	2019
10	Danny Lloyd	AM	(England)	Liverpool	26	40	13	Stockport County	1 July 2017	Free	2020
11	Marcus Maddison	LW/AM	(England)	Durham	24	180	42	Gateshead	27 August 2014	£250,000	2020
15	Joe Ward	LW	(England)	Chelmsford	22	18	0	Woking	10 January 2018	Undisclosed	2020
18	Leonardo Da Silva Lopes	CM	(Portugal)	Lisbon	19	107	4	Academy	1 July 2015	Trainee	Undisclosed
20	Michael Doughty	CM	(Wales)	Westminster	25	40	2	Queens Park Rangers	1 July 2017	Undisclosed	2020
21	Jermaine Anderson	CM	(England)	Camden Town	22	96	7	Academy	1 July 2012	Trainee	Undisclosed
29	Harrison Burrows	MF	(England)	Murrow	16	0	0	Academy	29 August 2017	Trainee	2018
37	George Cooper	AM	(England)	Warrington	21	13	2	Crewe Alexandra	18 January 2018	Undisclosed	2021
38	Andrea Borg	AM	(Malta)	Dubai	18	4	0	Academy	13 April 2017	Trainee	2019
42	Anthony Grant	CM	(England)	Lambeth	31	57	0	Port Vale	31 January 2017	Undisclosed	2019
Forwards
14	Jack Marriott	CF	(England)	Beverley	23	55	32	Luton Town	1 July 2017	Undisclosed	2021
16	Junior Morias	CF	(Jamaica)	Kingston	22	48	11	St Albans City	1 January 2017	Undisclosed	2019
19	Idris Kanu	CF	(England)	London	22	27	0	Aldershot Town	1 August 2017	Undisclosed	2020
26	Omar Bogle	CF	(England)	Sandwell	24	9	1	Cardiff City	1 February 2018	Loan	2018
35	Kasey Douglas	CF	(England)	Huntingdon	17	1	0	Academy	1 February 2017	Trainee	2020
Out on Loan
–	Brad Inman	CM	(Australia)	Adelaide	26	12	0	Crew Alexandra	1 July 2016	Free	2019
9	Ricky Miller	CF	(England)	Hatfield	29	13	0	Dover Athletic	1 July 2017	Free	2020
23	Callum Chettle	MF	(England)	Nottingham	21	21	0	Nuneaton Town	23 January 2016	Undisclosed	2019
28	Matty Stevens	CF	(England)	Surrey	20	2	0	Barnet	1 July 2016	Free	2019
33	Morgan Penfold	SS	(England)	Peterborough	19	0	0	Academy	28 January 2017	Trainee	2019
34	Sam Cartwright	CB	(England)	St Neots	17	0	0	Academy	1 July 2017	Free	2019
Transfer Listed
22	Adil Nabi	CM	(England)	Birmingham	24	10	0	West Bromwich Albion	21 January 2016	Undisclosed	2019
27	Jordan Nicholson	CF	(England)	Godmanchester	24	2	0	Histon	24 December 2015	Undisclosed	2018 (Note: Jordan Nicholson is also on loan at Nuneaton Town while being on the transfer list.)

== Statistics ==
As of 24 March 2018

No.	Pos	Nat	Player	Total		League One		FA Cup		League Cup		League Trophy	
No.	Pos	Nat	Player	Apps	Goals	Apps	Goals	Apps	Goals	Apps	Goals	Apps	Goals
1	GK	(England) ENG	Jonathan Bond	44	0	37+0	0	4+0	0	1+0	0	2+0	0
2	DF	(Wales) WAL	Liam Shephard	29	0	23+1	0	2+0	0	0+0	0	2+1	0
3	DF	(Wales) WAL	Andrew Hughes	55	2	35+8	1	6+0	1	0+1	0	4+1	0
5	DF	(Iran) IRN	Ryan Tafazolli	46	3	33+1	1	6+0	2	1+0	0	5+0	0
6	DF	(England) ENG	Jack Baldwin	42	3	32+1	2	2+1	1	1+0	0	5+0	0
7	MF	(Wales) WAL	Gwion Edwards	32	7	24+1	4	3+0	1	1+0	1	3+0	1
8	MF	(Republic of Ireland) IRL	Christopher Forrester	37	0	22+7	0	3+2	0	0+0	0	3+0	0
10	MF	(England) ENG	Danny Lloyd-McGoldrick	40	13	17+14	8	3+1	3	1+0	0	3+1	2
11	MF	(England) ENG	Marcus Maddison	53	12	41+0	8	6+0	2	1+0	0	5+0	2
14	FW	(England) ENG	Jack Marriott	55	33	44+0	27	6+0	5	1+0	0	2+2	1
15	MF	(England) ENG	Joe Ward	18	0	9+8	0	0+0	0	0+0	0	1+0	0
16	FW	(Jamaica) JAM	Junior Morias	30	7	12+13	6	0+2	0	1+0	0	2+0	1
17	DF	(Wales) WAL	Alex Penny	10	0	5+1	0	2+0	0	1+0	0	1+0	0
18	MF	(Portugal) POR	Leonardo Da Silva Lopes	51	0	29+10	0	6+0	0	0+1	0	4+1	0
19	FW	(England) ENG	Idris Kanu	27	0	1+17	0	0+3	0	0+1	0	2+3	0
20	MF	(Wales) WAL	Michael Doughty	41	2	28+6	1	3+0	1	1+0	0	3+0	0
21	MF	(England) ENG	Jermaine Anderson	22	0	7+10	0	0+2	0	0+0	0	1+2	0
25	GK	(Republic of Ireland) IRL	Conor O'Malley	14	0	9+0	0	2+0	0	0+0	0	3+0	0
26	FW	(England) ENG	Omar Bogle	9	1	4+5	1	0+0	0	0+0	0	0+0	0
27	DF	(England) ENG	Steven Taylor	51	4	43+1	3	6+0	0	0+0	0	1+0	1
32	DF	(England) ENG	Lewis Freestone	4	0	2+2	0	0+0	0	0+0	0	0+0	0
37	MF	(England) ENG	George Cooper	13	2	8+5	2	0+0	0	0+0	0	0+0	0
38	MF	(Malta) MLT	Andrea Borg	1	0	0+0	0	0+1	0	0+0	0	0+0	0
42	MF	(England) ENG	Anthony Grant	47	0	37+1	0	6+0	0	0+0	0	3+0	0
Out on loan:
9	FW	(England) ENG	Ricky Miller	13	0	4+6	0	0+1	0	0+0	0	1+1	0
23	MF	(England) ENG	Callum Chettle	2	0	0+2	0	0+0	0	0+0	0	0+0	0

=== Goals record ===
As of 6 May 2018

Rank	No.	Nat.	Po.	Name	League One	FA Cup	League Cup	League Trophy	Total
1	14	(England)	CF	Jack Marriott	27	5	0	1	33
2	10	(England)	AM	Danny Lloyd-McGoldrick	8	3	0	2	13
2	11	(England)	LM	Marcus Maddison	8	2	0	2	13
4	7	(Wales)	RM	Gwion Edwards	4	1	1	1	7
4	16	(Jamaica)	CF	Junior Morias	6	0	0	1	7
6	27	(England)	CB	Steven Taylor	3	0	0	1	4
7	3	(Wales)	LB	Andrew Hughes	2	1	0	0	3
7	5	(England)	CB	Ryan Tafazolli	1	2	0	0	3
7	6	(England)	CB	Jack Baldwin	2	1	0	0	3
10	20	(Wales)	CM	Michael Doughty	1	1	0	0	2
10	37	(England)	AM	George Cooper	2	0	0	0	2
12	26	(England)	CF	Omar Bogle	1	0	0	0	1
Own Goals					3	0	0	1	4
Total					69	16	1	9	96

=== Disciplinary record ===
As of 6 May 2018

Rank	No.	Nat.	Po.	Name	League One			FA Cup			League Cup			League Trophy			Total		
Rank	No.	Nat.	Po.	Name	Booked	(yellow card) (yellow-red card)	Sent off (straight red)	Booked	(yellow card) (yellow-red card)	Sent off (straight red)	Booked	(yellow card) (yellow-red card)	Sent off (straight red)	Booked	(yellow card) (yellow-red card)	Sent off (straight red)	Booked	(yellow card) (yellow-red card)	Sent off (straight red)
1	42	(England)	CM	Anthony Grant	10	1	0	0	0	0	0	0	0	1	0	0	11	1	0
2	11	(England)	LM	Marcus Maddison	10	0	0	0	0	0	0	0	0	0	0	0	10	0	0
3	5	(England)	CB	Ryan Tafazolli	9	0	0	0	0	0	0	0	0	0	0	0	9	0	0
4	7	(Wales)	RM	Gwion Edwards	7	0	0	0	0	0	0	0	0	1	0	0	8	0	0
5	6	(England)	CB	Jack Baldwin	4	1	1	0	0	0	0	0	0	0	0	0	4	1	1
6	18	(Portugal)	CM	Leonardo Da Silva Lopes	5	0	0	0	0	0	0	0	0	1	0	0	6	0	0
7	27	(England)	CB	Steven Taylor	3	1	0	0	0	0	0	0	0	0	0	0	3	1	0
8	2	(England)	RB	Liam Shephard	3	0	1	0	0	0	0	0	0	0	0	0	3	0	1
8	20	(Wales)	CM	Michael Doughty	3	0	0	1	0	0	0	0	0	0	0	0	4	0	0
10	9	(England)	CF	Ricky Miller	2	0	0	0	0	0	0	0	0	2	0	0	4	0	0
10	8	(Republic of Ireland)	DM	Christopher Forrester	1	0	0	0	0	0	0	0	0	2	0	0	3	0	0
10	14	(England)	CF	Jack Marriott	1	0	0	2	0	0	0	0	0	0	0	0	3	0	0
10	16	(Jamaica)	CF	Junior Morias	3	0	0	0	0	0	0	0	0	0	0	0	3	0	0
10	17	(England)	CB	Alex Penny	3	0	0	0	0	0	0	0	0	0	0	0	3	0	0
15	1	(England)	GK	Jonathan Bond	2	0	0	0	0	0	0	0	0	0	0	0	2	0	0
15	10	(England)	AM	Danny Lloyd-McGoldrick	2	0	0	0	0	0	0	0	0	0	0	0	2	0	0
17	3	(Wales)	LB	Andrew Hughes	1	0	0	0	0	0	0	0	0	0	0	0	1	0	0
17	19	(England)	CF	Idris Kanu	0	0	0	0	0	0	0	0	0	1	0	0	1	0	0
17	21	(England)	CM	Jermaine Anderson	1	0	0	0	0	0	0	0	0	0	0	0	1	0	0
17	37	(England)	AM	George Cooper	1	0	0	0	0	0	0	0	0	0	0	0	1	0	0
Total					71	3	1	3	0	0	0	0	0	8	0	0	82	3	1

== Transfers ==
=== Transfers in ===
Date from	Position	Nationality	Name	From	Fee	Ref.
1 July 2017	CM	(Wales)	Michael Doughty	Queens Park Rangers	Undisclosed	
1 July 2017	CF	(England)	Danny Lloyd	Stockport County	Free	
1 July 2017	CF	(England)	Jack Marriott	Luton Town	Undisclosed	
1 July 2017	CF	(England)	Ricky Miller	Dover Athletic	Free	
1 July 2017	GK	(England)	Josh Tibbetts	Birmingham City	Free	
10 July 2017	RB	(Wales)	Liam Shephard	Swansea City	Free	
19 July 2017	CB	(Wales)	Alex Penny	Nuneaton Town	£50,000	
25 July 2017	CB	(England)	Steven Taylor	Ipswich Town	Free	
1 August 2017	CF	(England)	Idris Kanu	Aldershot Town	Undisclosed	
7 August 2017	GK	(Republic of Ireland)	Conor O'Malley	St Patrick's Athletic	Undisclosed	
10 January 2018	LW	(England)	Joe Ward	Woking	Undisclosed	
18 January 2018	CM	(England)	George Cooper	Crewe Alexandra	Undisclosed	

=== Transfers out ===
Date from	Position	Nationality	Name	To	Fee	Ref.
1 July 2017	CF	(England)	Lee Angol	Mansfield Town	Undisclosed	
1 July 2017	LB	(England)	Jerome Binnom-Williams	Chesterfield	Free	
1 July 2017	GK	(England)	Dion-Curtis Henry	Crystal Palace	Released	(Note: Dion-Curtis Henry joined Crystal Palace following his release.)
1 July 2017	RB	(Northern Ireland)	Michael Smith	Heart of Midlothian	Undisclosed	
1 July 2017	CF	(England)	Paul Taylor	Bradford City	Released	(Note: Paul Taylor joined Bradford City following his release.)
1 July 2017	GK	(England)	Mark Tyler	Coaching role	—N/a	
1 July 2017	RB	(England)	Hayden White	Mansfield Town	Undisclosed	
13 July 2017	CF	(England)	Luke James	Forest Green Rovers	Free	
17 July 2017	CF	(England)	Tom Nichols	Bristol Rovers	Undisclosed	
20 July 2017	RM	(England)	Harry Anderson	Lincoln City	Undisclosed	
20 July 2017	CB	(England)	Michael Bostwick	Lincoln City	Undisclosed	
26 July 2017	CF	(England)	Shaq Coulthirst	Barnet	Mutual consent	(Note: Shaq Coulthirst joined Barnet following his departure.)
31 January 2018	CF	(England)	Jordan Nicholson	Barnet	Undisclosed	

=== Loans in ===
Start date	Position	Nationality	Name	From	End date	Ref.
1 July 2017	GK	(England)	Jonathan Bond	Reading	30 June 2018	
1 February 2018	CF	(England)	Omar Bogle	Cardiff City	30 June 2018	

=== Loans out ===
Start date	Position	Nationality	Name	To	End date	Ref.
1 July 2017	CM	(Australia)	Brad Inman	Rochdale	30 June 2018	
4 July 2017	SS	(England)	Jordan Nicholson	Nuneaton Town	30 July 2018	
5 July 2017	CF	(England)	Matthew Stevens	Kettering Town	30 June 2018	
5 August 2017	CB	(England)	Sam Cartwright	Leatherhead	30 December 2017	
11 August 2017	ST	(England)	Morgan Penfold	St Ives Town	30 December 2017	
3 January 2018	CM	(England)	Callum Chettle	AFC Fylde	30 June 2018	
31 January 2018	CF	(England)	Ricky Miller	Mansfield Town	30 June 2018	

== Competitions ==
=== Friendlies ===
As of 28 June 2017 Peterborough United have announced seven pre-season friendlies against Queens Park Rangers, St Albans City, Wolverhampton Wanderers, Ipswich Town, Cheltenham Town, Lincoln City and Deeping Rangers.

8 July 2017	St Albans City	1–4	Peterborough United	St Albans
15:00 BST	Lucien 30' (pen.)	Report	Morias 43'; Lloyd 48'; Miller 56', 57'	Stadium: Clarence Park

11 July 2017	Nuneaton Town	3–5	Peterborough United	Nuneaton
19:30 BST	Daniels 36' (pen.), 38'; Henshaw 70'	Report	Morias 3'; Miller 12'; Penfold 72'; Nichols 74'; Doughty 90+1'	Stadium: Liberty Way

15 July 2017	Peterborough United	2–4	Queens Park Rangers	Peterborough
15:00 BST (120 min match)	Morias 63' (pen.), 72'	Report	Mackie 33'; Robinson 86'; Eze 89'; Owens 106'	Stadium: London Road Stadium

18 July 2017	Peterborough United	1–3	Ipswich Town	Peterborough
19:00 BST (120 min match)	Marriott 13'	Report	McGoldrick 22'; Garner 41', 47'	Stadium: ABAX Stadium

22 July 2017	Lincoln City	2–3	Peterborough United	Lincoln
13:00 BST	Green 26'; Ginnelly 78'	Report	Edwards 6'; Marriott 18', 90'	Stadium: Sincil Bank; Attendance: 2322; Referee: Tom Nield

22 July 2017	Deeping Rangers	1–4	Peterborough United	Market Deeping
15:00 BST	Gash 89'	Report	Lloyd 13'; Miller 45', 82'; Penfold 73'	Stadium: The Haydon Whitham Stadium; Attendance: 552; Referee: Richie Watkins

25 July 2017	Peterborough United	0–1	Wolverhampton Wanderers	Peterborough
19:30 BST		Report	Samuels 70'	Stadium: ABAX Stadium; Referee: Neil Hair

29 July 2017	Cheltenham Town	1–5	Peterborough United	Cheltenham
15:00 BST	Holman 12'	Report	Marriott 42', 72', 81'; Maddison 60'; Grimes 89' (o.g.)	Stadium: LCI Rail Stadium

29 July 2017	Stamford	3–7	Peterborough United	Stamford
15:00 BST	Morgan 49' ? 51'; Sandy 75'	Report	Miller 1', 83', 90+2'; Penfold 8'; Stevens 28', 48'; Craig Mackail-Smith 68'	Stadium: Zeeco Stadium

=== League One ===
==== League table ====
Pos	Team	Pld	W	D	L	GF	GA	GD	Pts
7	Plymouth Argyle	46	19	11	16	58	59	−1	68
8	Portsmouth	46	20	6	20	57	56	+1	66
9	Peterborough United	46	17	13	16	68	60	+8	64
10	Southend United	46	17	12	17	58	62	−4	63
11	Bradford City	46	18	9	19	57	67	−10	63

Source: BBC Sport
Rules for classification: 1) Points; 2) Goal difference; 3) Number of goals scored

==== Results summary ====
Overall								Home						Away					
Pld	W	D	L	GF	GA	GD	Pts	W	D	L	GF	GA	GD	W	D	L	GF	GA	GD
46	17	13	16	68	60	+8	64	12	4	7	37	26	+11	5	9	9	31	34	−3

Last updated: 20 January 2018.
Source: Statto.com

==== Results by matchday ====
Matchday	1	2	3	4	5	6	7	8	9	10	11	12	13	14	15	16	17	18	19	20	21	22	23	24	25	26	27	28	29	30	31	32	33	34	35	36	37	38	39	40	41	42	43	44	45	46
Ground	H	A	H	A	A	H	H	A	H	A	H	H	A	A	H	A	H	H	A	A	H	A	H	A	A	H	A	H	H	A	H	A	H	H	H	A	A	H	A	H	A	H	A	A	H	A
Result	W	W	W	W	D	L	W	D	W	L	L	L	D	L	W	D	L	W	L	D	L	W	W	W	L	D	D	W	L	D	D	D	D	W	W	W	L	D	D	W	L	L	L	L	W	L
Position	5	2	2	1	1	3	2	2	2	3	4	7	8	10	8	8	11	7	8	7	10	9	9	9	9	9	9	8	8	8	10	10	10	8	7	6	7	6	7	5	8	9	9	9	8	9

Updated to match(es) played on 2 April 2018. Source: Statto.com
A = Away; H = Home; W = Win; D = Draw; L = Loss

==== Matches ====
On 21 June 2017, the league fixtures were announced.

5 August 2017 1	Peterborough United	2–1	Plymouth Argyle	Peterborough
15:00 BST	Sawyer 4' (o.g.); Lopes (yellow card) 29'; Morias 47'; Grant (yellow card) 66'	Report	Carey (yellow card) 27'; Fox (yellow card) 51'; Wylde 76'	Stadium: London Road Stadium; Attendance: 7,622; Referee: John Busby

12 August 2017 2	Bristol Rovers	1–4	Peterborough United	Horfield
15:00 BST	Sercombe (yellow card) 14'; Gaffney 85'	Report	Marriott 6', 55', 90+5'; Grant (yellow card) 19'; Taylor (yellow card) 45', (goal) 78'	Stadium: Memorial Stadium; Attendance: 9,758; Referee: Nick Kinseley

19 August 2017 3	Peterborough United	2–1	Rotherham United	Peterborough
15:00 BST	Marriott 47', 75'	Report	Kieffer Moore 55'	Stadium: London Road Stadium; Attendance: 6,344; Referee: Ross Joyce

26 August 2017 4	Northampton Town	1–4	Peterborough United	Northampton
15:00 BST	Revell 85'	Report	Edwards 32'; Morias 41'; Marriott 75'; Maddison 90+2' (pen.)	Stadium: Sixfields Stadium; Attendance: 6,685; Referee: Roger East

2 September 2017 5	Doncaster Rovers	0–0	Peterborough United	Doncaster
15:00 BST		Report		Stadium: Keepmoat Stadium; Attendance: 8,677; Referee: Graham Salisbury

9 September 2017 6	Peterborough United	1–3	Bradford City	Peterborough
15:00 BST	Doughty (yellow card) 28'; Miller (yellow card) 63'; Morias (yellow card) 64'; Grant (yellow card) 64' (yellow-red card) 89'; Baldwin 70'	Report	Poleon 7'; Gilliead (yellow card) 14'; Vincelot 36', (yellow card) 88'; Kilgallon 40'; McMahon (yellow card) 73'; Chicksen (yellow card) 83' (yellow-red card) 90'	Stadium: London Road Stadium; Attendance: 7,601; Referee: Keith Strough

12 September 2017 7	Peterborough United	2–0	Milton Keynes Dons	Peterborough
19:45 BST	Tafazolli 47'; Maddison 52'	Report		Stadium: London Road Stadium; Attendance: 6,465; Referee: Carl Boyeson

16 September 2017 8	Walsall	1–1	Peterborough United	Walsall
15:00 BST	Chambers (yellow card) 26'; Oztumer 38'	Report	Grant (yellow card) 28'; Edwards (yellow card) 58', (goal) 72'	Stadium: Bescot Stadium; Attendance: 4,453; Referee: Seb Stockbridge

23 September 2017 9	Peterborough United	3–2	Wigan Athletic	Peterborough
15:00 BST	Morias 47', 84'; Marriott 90'	Report	Jacobs 33'; Colclough 87'	Stadium: London Road Stadium; Attendance: 6,099; Referee: Chris Sarginson

26 September 2017 10	Oldham Athletic	3–2	Peterborough United	Oldham
19:45 BST	Doyle 51' 85'; Gardner 80'	Report	Maddison 58' (pen.); Marriott 90+2'	Stadium: Boundary Park; Attendance: 2,975; Referee: Anthony Backhouse

30 September 2017 11	Peterborough United	1–4	Oxford United	Peterborough
15:00 BST	Marriott 15'; Miller (yellow card) 31'	Report	Nelson (yellow card) 30'; Ricardinho (yellow card) 38'; Ruffels 48'; Thomas 53'; Rothwell 75'; Mehmeti 82'	Stadium: London Road Stadium; Attendance: 6,153; Referee: Tom Nield

7 October 2017 P	Charlton Athletic	v	Peterborough United	Charlton
15:00 BST				Stadium: The Valley
Note: On 28 September, the scheduled away fixture against Charlton Athletic was postponed due to international call-ups.

14 October 2017 12	Peterborough United	0–1	Gillingham	Peterborough
15:00 BST	Baldwin (yellow card) 20'	Report	Martin 35'; Hessenthaler (yellow card) 58'; Wagstaff (yellow card) 77'; Wilkinson (yellow card) 83'	Stadium: London Road Stadium; Attendance: 5,257; Referee: Dean Whitestone

17 October 2017 13	Southend United	1–1	Peterborough United	Southend-on-Sea
19:45 BST	Fortuné 10'; Demetriou (yellow card) 30'; Yearwood (yellow card) 53'; Cox (yellow card) 87'	Report	Baldwin (yellow card) 20'; Marriott 55'; Da Silva Lopes (yellow card) 84'	Stadium: Roots Hall; Attendance: 5,789; Referee: Kevin Johnson

21 October 2017 14	Scunthorpe United	2–1	Peterborough United	Scunthorpe
15:00 BST	Holmes (yellow card) 30'; Bishop (yellow card) 34'; Clarke (yellow card) 63'; Novak 84'; Morris 87'	Report	Hughes 51'; Sherpard (yellow card) 84'; Bond (yellow card) 87'	Stadium: Glanford Park; Attendance: 4,275; Referee: Mark Heywood

28 October 2017 15	Peterborough United	1–0	Shrewsbury Town	Peterborough
15:00 BST	Maddison 14' (yellow card) 21'; Edwards (yellow card) 43'; Grant (yellow card) 65'; Tafazolli (yellow card) 74'	Report	Whalley (yellow card) 48'; Nolan (yellow card) 50'; Ogogo (yellow card) 58'; Godfrey (yellow card) 64'	Stadium: London Road Stadium; Attendance: 5,606; Referee: David Webb

12 November 2017 16	AFC Wimbledon	2–2	Peterborough United	Norbiton
14:30 GMT	Taylor 1'; McDonald 45'; Francomb (yellow card) 82'; Trotter (yellow card) 85'	Report	Lloyd 26'; Maddison 38' (pen.) (yellow card) 85'	Stadium: Kingsmeadow; Attendance: 4,220; Referee: Darren Handley

18 November 2017 17	Peterborough United	0–1	Blackpool	Peterborough
15:00 GMT	Tafazolli (yellow card) 38'	Report	Vassell 21'; Turton (yellow card) 72'; Solomon-Otabor (yellow card) 82'	Stadium: London Road Stadium; Attendance: 5,254; Referee: Trevor Kettle

21 November 2017 18	Peterborough United	2–1	Portsmouth	Peterborough
19:45 GMT	Grant (yellow card) 54'; Marriott 58'; Clarke 70' (o.g.); Edwards (yellow card) 86'	Report	Burgess (yellow card) 69'; Chaplin 78'	Stadium: London Road Stadium; Attendance: 5,217; Referee: Craig Hicks

25 November 2017 19	Rochdale	2–0	Peterborough United	Spotland
15:00 GMT	Slew (yellow card) 21'; Andrew 33'; Camps 36'; Rathbone (yellow card) 68'; McNulty (yellow card) 90+1'	Report		Stadium: Spotland Stadium; Attendance: 2,555; Referee: Martin Coy

28 November 2017 20	Charlton Athletic	2–2	Peterborough United	Charlton
19:45 GMT	Holmes 90+1' (pen.); Ahearne-Grant 90+4'	Report	Edwards 11'; Penny (yellow card) 56'; Marriott 58'; Grant (yellow card) 90+1'	Stadium: The Valley; Attendance: 9,532; Referee: John Brooks

9 December 2017 21	Peterborough United	2–3	Blackburn Rovers	Peterborough
15:00 GMT	Baldwin (yellow card) 3' (yellow-red card) 90+5'; Taylor 11'; Marriott 90+3'; Tafazolli (yellow card) 90+5'	Report	Antonsson (yellow card) 30'; Mulgrew 48'; Dack 51', 58'; Smallwood (yellow card) 61'	Stadium: London Road Stadium; Attendance: 6,164; Referee: Nick Kinsley

17 December 2017 22	Fleetwood Town	2–3	Peterborough United	Fleetwood
15:00 GMT	Bell 29'; Bolger 82'	Report	Doughty 55'; Marriott 88'; Lloyd 90'	Stadium: Highbury Stadium; Attendance: 2,273; Referee: Anthony Backhouse

23 December 2017 23	Peterborough United	3–0	Bury	Peterborough
15:00 GMT	Lloyd 3', 71'; Marriott 63'	Report	O'Connell (yellow card) 54' (yellow-red card) 56'	Stadium: ABAX Stadium; Attendance: 4,640; Referee: Andy Woolmer

26 December 2017 24	Bradford City	1–3	Peterborough United	Bradford
15:00 GMT	Taylor 83'	Report	Lloyd 14'; Marriott 33' (67)	Stadium: Valley Parade; Attendance: 21,220; Referee: Darren Handley

30 December 2017 25	Milton Keynes Dons	1–0	Peterborough United	Milton Keynes
15:00 GMT	Walsh (red card) 9'; Aneke 27'; Sow (red card) 35'	Report		Stadium: Stadium MK; Attendance: 10,304; Referee: Charles Breakspear

1 January 2018 26	Peterborough United	1–1	Doncaster Rovers	Peterborough
15:00 GMT	Lloyd-McGoldrick 4'; Maddison (yellow card) 34'; Penny (yellow card) 57'	Report	Wright (yellow card) 59'; Mason (yellow card) 71'; Whiteman 90+3'	Stadium: London Road Stadium; Attendance: 5,173; Referee: John Brooks

13 January 2018 27	Wigan Athletic	0–0	Peterborough United	Wigan
15:00 GMT		Report		Stadium: DW Stadium; Attendance: 8,602; Referee: Eddie Ilderton

20 January 2018 28	Peterborough United	3–0	Oldham Athletic	Peterborough
15:00 GMT	Morias 53'; Cooper 84'; Marriott 90' (pen)	Report	Edmundson (yellow card) 45' (yellow-red card) 68'	Stadium: London Road Stadium; Attendance: 5,072; Referee: Seb Stockbridge

3 February 2018 29	Peterborough United	0–1	Southend United	Peterborough
15:00 GMT		Report	Demetriou 7' (pen)	Stadium: London Road Stadium; Attendance: 5,114; Referee: Dean Whitestone

10 February 2018 30	Gillingham	1–1	Peterborough United	Gillingham
15:00 GMT	Ehmer 90+3'	Report	Lloyd 67'	Stadium: Priestfield Stadium; Attendance: 7,154; Referee: Andy Davies

13 February 2018 31	Peterborough United	2–2	Scunthorpe United	Peterborough
19:45 GMT	Maddison 2'; Morias 45+2'	Report	Toney 34'; Yates 60'	Stadium: London Road Stadium; Attendance: 4,397; Referee: Trevor Kettle

18 February 2018 32	Blackpool	1–1	Peterborough United	Blackpool
15:00 GMT	Delfouneso 45+3'; Mellor (yellow card) 57'	Report	Marriott 21', (yellow card) 62'	Stadium: Bloomfield Road; Attendance: 3,286; Referee: Eddie Ilderton

24 February 2018 33	Peterborough United	1–1	AFC Wimbledon	Peterborough
15:00 GMT	Maddison 79'	Report	Taylor 75'	Stadium: London Road Stadium; Attendance: 5,146; Referee: Anthony Backhouse

27 February 2018 34	Peterborough United	2–1	Walsall	Peterborough
19:45 GMT	Bogle 39'; Baldwin 53'	Report	Ngoy 9'	Stadium: London Road Stadium; Attendance: 2,531; Referee: Lee Swabey

10 March 2018 35	Peterborough United	4–1	Charlton Athletic	Peterborough
15:00 GMT	Hughes 44'; Maddison 58' (pen.); Marriott 81' (84)	Report	Żyro 73'	Stadium: London Road Stadium; Attendance: 6,337; Referee: Brett Huxtable

13 March 2018 36	Bury	0–1	Peterborough United	Bury
19:45 GMT		Report	Marriott 90+2'	Stadium: Gigg Lane; Attendance: 2,784; Referee: David Webb

17 March 2018 37	Oxford United	2–1	Peterborough United	Oxford
15:00 GMT	Dickie 6'; Henry 61'	Report	Marriott 62'; Baldwin (yellow card) 90+3' (yellow-red card)	Stadium: Kassam Stadium; Attendance: 6,804; Referee: Robert Lewis

24 March 2018 38	Peterborough United	1–1	Bristol Rovers	Peterborough
15:00 GMT	Lloyd 59'	Report	Craig 55'	Stadium: London Road Stadium; Attendance: 5,953; Referee: Carl Boyeson

30 March 2018 39	Rotherham United	1–1	Peterborough United	Rotherham
15:00 BST	Lavery 68'; Smith (yellow card) 90+5'	Report	Tafazolli (yellow card) 59'; Morias (yellow card) 72'; Marriott 90+8'	Stadium: New York Stadium; Attendance: 9,573; Referee: Scott Oldham

2 April 2018 40	Peterborough United	2–0	Northampton Town	Peterborough
15:00 BST	Baldwin 12'; Marriott 14'	Report	Taylor (red card) 79'	Stadium: London Road Stadium; Attendance: 8,619; Referee: Michael Salisbury

7 April 2018 41	Plymouth Argyle	2–1	Peterborough United	Plymouth
15:00 BST	Taylor 27'; Carey 90+2' (pen)	Report	Marriott 9'; Shephard (red card) 75'; Taylor (yellow card) 90+1' (yellow-red card)	Stadium: Home Park; Attendance: 10,923; Referee: Craig Hicks

14 April 2018 42	Peterborough United	0–1	Rochdale	Peterborough
15:00 BST		Report	Henderson 16' (red card) 53'; Camps (yellow card) 36'; Kitching (yellow card) 38'; Andrew (yellow card) 87'	Stadium: London Road Stadium; Attendance: 5,496; Referee: Antony Coggins

19 April 2018 43	Blackburn Rovers	3–1	Peterborough United	Blackburn
19:45 BST	Dack 54' (90+4); Graham 83'	Report	Mulgrew 44' (o.g.)	Stadium: Ewood Park; Attendance: 11,679; Referee: Ross Joyce

24 April 2018 44	Shrewsbury Town	3–1	Peterborough United	Shrewsbury
19:45 BST	Beckles 59'; Payne 73'; John-Lewis 90+2'	Report	Edwards 32'	Stadium: New Meadow; Attendance: 4,666; Referee: Mark Heywood

28 April 2018 45	Peterborough United	2–0	Fleetwood Town	Peterborough
15:00 BST	Marriott 51'; Cooper 84'	Report		Stadium: London Road Stadium; Attendance: 4,667; Referee: Graham Horwood

5 May 2018 46	Portsmouth	2–0	Peterborough United	Milton
17:30 BST	Pitman 13', 25'	Report		Stadium: Fratton Park; Attendance: 18,118; Referee: John Busby

=== FA Cup ===
On 16 October 2017, Peterborough United were drawn at home to Tranmere Rovers in the first round. A 1–1 draw meant a replay would be played at Prenton Park. Victory over Woking in the second round replay set up a third round trip to Villa Park.

4 November 2017 First round	Peterborough United	1–1	Tranmere Rovers	Peterborough
GMT	Marriott 52'	Report	Cook 72'	Stadium: London Road Stadium; Attendance: 3,750; Referee: Charles Breakspear

15 November 2017 First round replay	Tranmere Rovers	0–5	Peterborough United	Birkenhead
19:45 GMT	Harris (red card) 25'; Jennings (yellow card) 39'; Norwood (yellow card) 66'	Report	Doughty (yellow card) 6'; Lloyd 16', 22', 73'; Baldwin 67'; Maddison 75' (pen.)	Stadium: Prenton Park; Attendance: 4,199; Referee: Michael Salisbury

3 December 2017 Second round	Woking	1–1	Peterborough United	Woking
15:00 GMT	Isaac (yellow card) 80'; Ward 84'	Report	Tafazolli 24'; Marriott (yellow card) 42'	Stadium: Kingfield Stadium; Attendance: 3,032; Referee: Chris Sarginson

12 December 2017 Second round replay	Peterborough United	5–2	Woking	Peterborough
19:45 GMT	Doughty 29'; Marriott 45', 69' (yellow card) 85'; Maddison 78' (pen.); Edwards 90+3'	Report	Effiong 19'; Young 68'; Jones (yellow card) 78'	Stadium: London Road Stadium; Attendance: 3,022; Referee: Antony Coggins

6 January 2018 Third round	Aston Villa	1–3	Peterborough United	Aston
15:00 GMT	Davis 8'	Report	Marriott 75', 90+3'; Tafazolli 83'	Stadium: Villa Park; Attendance: 21,677; Referee: Robert Jones

27 January 2018 Fourth round	Peterborough United	1–5	Leicester City	Peterborough
12:30 GMT	Hughes 58'	Report	Diabaté 9', 87'; Iheanacho 12', 29'; Ndidi 90+2'	Stadium: London Road Stadium; Attendance: 13,193; Referee: Michael Oliver

=== EFL Cup ===
On 16 June 2017, Peterborough United were drawn at home to Barnet in the first round.

8 August 2017 First round	Peterborough United	1–3	Barnet	Peterborough
19:45 BST	Edwards 30'	Report	Akpa Akpro 22'; Vilhete 39'; Coulthirst 58'	Stadium: ABAX Stadium; Attendance: 2,725; Referee: Tony Harrington

=== EFL Trophy ===
On 12 July 2017, the group stage draw was completed with Peterborough facing Cambridge United, Northampton Town and Southampton U23s in Southern Group H. After topping the group, Peterborough United were drawn at home to Southend United in the second round. Luton Town away was announced for the third round.

Pos	Lge	Team	Pld	W	PW	PL	L	GF	GA	GD	Pts	Qualification
1	L1	Peterborough United (Q)	3	2	0	1	0	5	1	+4	7	Round 2
2	L1	Northampton Town (Q)	3	0	3	0	0	5	5	0	6	Round 2
3	ACA	Southampton U21 (E)	3	1	0	1	1	4	5	−1	4	
4	L2	Cambridge United (E)	3	0	0	1	2	1	4	−3	1	

Updated to match(es) played on 7 November 2017. Source: EFL.com
(E) Eliminated; (Q) Qualified to the phase indicated

29 August 2017	Peterborough United	2–0	Southampton U23s	Peterborough
19:45 BST	Morias 2'; Maddison 21' (pen.)	Report		Stadium: London Road Stadium; Attendance: 2,282; Referee: Trevor Kettle

3 October 2017	Peterborough United	1–1 (2–4 p)	Northampton Town	Peterborough
19:45 BST	Lloyd 43'	Report	Baldwin 79' (o.g.)	Stadium: London Road Stadium; Attendance: 2,745; Referee: Gavin Ward
	Penalties
	Marriott (penalty missed); Doughty (penalty scored); Lopes (penalty scored); Hughes (penalty missed)		Grimes (penalty scored); Revell (penalty scored); Richards (penalty scored); Waters (penalty scored)

7 November 2017	Cambridge United	0–2	Peterborough United	Cambridge
19:45 GMT	Lewis (yellow card) 55'	Report	Taylor 50'; Edwards (yellow card) 64'; Marriott 81'	Stadium: Abbey Stadium; Attendance: 3,138; Referee: Gavin Ward

6 December 2017 Second round	Peterborough United	2–0	Southend United	Peterborough
19:45 GMT	Edwards 16'; Maddison 62'; Miller (yellow card) 81'; Kanu (yellow card) 83'; Forrester (yellow card) 85'	Report	Demetriou (yellow card) 90+6'	Stadium: London Road Stadium; Attendance: 1,707; Referee: John Busby

9 January 2018 Third round	Luton Town	0–0 (6–7 p)	Peterborough United	Luton
19:45 GMT		Report		Stadium: Kenilworth Road; Attendance: 2,253; Referee: Antony Coggins
	Penalties
	Cook (penalty scored); McQuoid (penalty scored); Lee (penalty scored); Shinnie (penalty scored); Sheehan (penalty scored); PMpanzu (penalty scored); Musonda (penalty missed)		Maddison (penalty scored); Doughty (penalty scored); Marriott (penalty scored); Shephard (penalty scored); Kanu (penalty scored); Baldwin (penalty scored); Tafazolli (penalty scored)

23 January 2018 Quarter Finals	Lincoln City	4–2	Peterborough United	Lincoln
19:45 GMT	Rowe 43'; Rhead 55'; Anderson 90+1'; Green 90+4'	Report	Eardley 14' (o.g.); Lloyd 50'	Stadium: Sincil Bank; Attendance: 6,663; Referee: Michael Salisbury
