= Morgan Penfold =

English footballer

Personal information
- Full name: Morgan Kendall Penfold
- Date of birth: 3 December 1998 (age 27)
- Place of birth: Whittlesey, England
- Height: 5 ft 11 in (1.81 m)
- Position: Forward

Youth career
- 2008–2016: Peterborough United

Senior career*
Years	Team	Apps	(Gls)
2016–2019	Peterborough United	0	(0)
2016–2017	→ St Ives Town (loan)	12	(0)
2017–2018	→ Biggleswade Town (loan)	14	(1)
2017–2018	→ Boston United (loan)	1	(0)
2018–2019	→ Grantham Town (loan)	2	(0)
2019	→ Bedford Town (loan)	3	(0)
2019	→ Hitchin Town (loan)	5	(0)
2019	→ St Ives Town (loan)	4	(0)
2019–2021	Barrow	3	(0)
2020–2021	→ F.C United of Manchester (loan)	4	(0)
2022	Spalding United	2	(0)
2022	→ Wisbech Town (dual-registration)	0	(0)
- * Club domestic league appearances and goals as of 19:27, 26 December 2020 (UTC)

Morgan Kendall Penfold (born 3 December 1998) is an English professional footballer who recently played as a forward for Wisbech Town.

== Career ==
After an eight-year spell in the Peterborough United academy, Penfold made his first-team debut during a 6–1 EFL Trophy defeat against Norwich City U23s, replacing Marcus Maddison in the 72nd minute.

In October 2016, Penfold joined Southern League Premier Division side St Ives Town on a youth loan. On 22 October 2016, Penfold made his St Ives debut in their 4–1 away defeat against Hitchin Town, replacing Jordan Jarrold. Penfold went onto make eleven more league appearances for St Ives before returning to Peterborough in January 2017.

After several further loan spells, including a return to St Ives Town in 2019, he was released by Peterborough United at the end of the 2018–19 season.

Penfold then joined National League side Barrow, signing an initial two-year deal on 15 May 2019, forming part of their promotion winning side in 2020. In October 2020, he joined F.C. United of Manchester on a three-month loan deal. Penfold retired from professional football in 2021 and works for Mick George Group in Peterborough.

Penfold came out of retirement and signed for Northern Premier League Division One Midlands club Spalding United in September 2022.

Penfold signed for United Counties League Premier Division North club Wisbech Town on dual-registration in November 2022.

On 20 December 2022, it was announced that Penfold had left the club.

== Career statistics ==
As of match played 26 December 2020

Appearances and goals by club, season and competition
Club	Season	League			FA Cup		League Cup		Other		Total	
Club	Season	Division	Apps	Goals	Apps	Goals	Apps	Goals	Apps	Goals	Apps	Goals
Peterborough United	2016–17	League One	0	0	0	0	0	0	1 (Note: Appearance in EFL Trophy)	0	1	0
Peterborough United	2017–18	League One	0	0	0	0	0	0	0	0	0	0
Peterborough United	2018–19	League One	0	0	0	0	0	0	0	0	0	0
Peterborough United	Total		0	0	0	0	0	0	1	0	1	0
St Ives Town (loan)	2016–17	Southern League Premier Division	12	0	0	0	—		3 (Note: Two appearances in FA Trophy, one in Southern League Cup)	0	15	0
Biggleswade Town (loan)	2017–18	Southern League Premier Division	14	1	0	0	—		1 (Note: Appearance in Southern League Cup)	0	15	1
Boston United (loan)	2017–18	National League North	1	0	0	0	—		0	0	1	0
Grantham Town (loan)	2018–19	Northern Premier League	2	0	0	0	—		0	0	2	0
Bedford Town (loan)	2018–19	Southern League Division One Central	3	0	0	0	—		1 (Note: Appearance in FA Trophy)	0	4	0
Hitchin Town (loan)	2018–19	Southern League Premier Division	5	0	0	0	—		1 (Note: Appearance in Herts Charity Cup)	1	6	1
St Ives Town (loan)	2018–19	Southern League Premier Division	4	0	0	0	—		0	0	4	0
Barrow	2019–20	National League	3	0	0	0	—		2	1	5	1
Barrow	2020–21	League Two	0	0	0	0	0	0	1	0	1	0
Barrow	Total		3	0	0	0	0	0	3	1	6	1
F.C. United of Manchester (loan)	2020–21	Northern Premier League	3	0	1	0	—		1	0	5	0
Career total			47	1	1	0	0	0	11	2	59	2
