= Callum Chettle =

English footballer (born 1996)

Personal information
- Full name: Callum Louis Chettle
- Date of birth: 28 August 1996 (age 30)
- Place of birth: Nottingham, England
- Height: 1.78 m (5 ft 10 in)
- Position: Midfielder

Team information
- Current team: Barwell

Youth career
- –2012: Nottingham Forest

Senior career*
Years	Team	Apps	(Gls)
2012–2015	Ilkeston	78	(3)
2015–2016	Nuneaton Town	25	(2)
2016–2018	Peterborough United	18	(0)
2018	→ AFC Fylde (loan)	9	(0)
2018–2019	Alfreton Town	16	(2)
2019	→ Boston United (loan)	2	(0)
2019	→ Matlock Town (loan)	7	(2)
2019–2022	Basford United	43	(1)
2022–2023	Mickleover	4	(0)
2023–2024	Nuneaton Borough (Note: Chettle made 11 league appearances for Nuneaton Borough in the 2023–2024 Southern League Premier Division Central; however these matches were expunged when the club withdrew from the competition part-way through the season)	0	(0)
2023	→ Mickleover (loan)	2	(0)
2024	Stamford	11	(0)
2024–2025	Spalding United	14	(1)
2024	→ Redditch United (loan)	2	(0)
2025	Eastwood	4	(0)
2025–	Barwell	0	(0)

International career
2015	England C	1	(0)
- * Club domestic league appearances and goals as of 11:23, 13 June 2025 (UTC)

Callum Louis Chettle (born 28 August 1996) is an English footballer who plays as a midfielder for Northern Premier League Division One Midlands club Barwell.

After leaving Nottingham Forest for Ilkeston at the age of 15, he moved up the divisions to join Nuneaton Town in July 2015, and then Peterborough United in January 2016.

== Club career ==
Chettle spent his youth with Nottingham Forest, before joining Northern Premier League side Ilkeston at the age of 15. He became the youngest player to start a competitive game for the club when he made his debut at the age of 16. He signed with National League North club Nuneaton Town in July 2015. He entered the Football League when he joined Peterborough United for an undisclosed fee in January 2016; he signed a 2 1/2-year contract. He made his League One debut for the "Posh" on 1 March, coming on as an 85-minute substitute for Leonardo Da Silva Lopes in a 3–1 defeat to Bury at Gigg Lane.

On 3 January 2018, Chettle joined National League side AFC Fylde on loan for the remainder of the campaign.

In July 2018, Chettle joined National League North side Alfreton Town on a one-year deal. On 4 January 2019, he was loaned out to Boston United for one month. On 28 March 2019, he was loaned out again, this time to Matlock Town until the end of the season.

In May 2019, Chettle signed for Northern Premier League Premier Division team Basford United, who were managed by his father Steve Chettle.

In May 2022, Chettle signed for Mickleover. However, his spell with the club was disrupted by injuries. In June 2023, Chettle signed for former club Nuneaton Borough, before rejoining Mickleover on loan in September. After Nuneaton withdrew from the Southern League part-way through the season due to a lack of funding, Chettle signed for Stamford.

In July 2024, Chettle joined Spalding United. In November 2024, he joined Redditch United on an initial one-month loan deal. In March 2025, he joined United Counties Premier Division North side Eastwood.

In June 2025, Chettle joined Southern League Premier Division Central side Barwell.

== International career ==
Chettle played for the England C team on 1 June 2015, in a 2–1 victory over the Republic of Ireland under-21 side.

== Personal life ==
He is the son of former Nottingham Forest player Steve Chettle.

== Career statistics ==
As of match played 13 January 2024

Appearances and goals by club, season and competition
Season	Club	League			FA Cup		League Cup		Other		Total	
Season	Club	Division	Apps	Goals	Apps	Goals	Apps	Goals	Apps	Goals	Apps	Goals
Ilkeston	2012–13	Northern Premier League Premier Division	4	0	0	0	—		0	0	4	0
Ilkeston	2013–14	Northern Premier League Premier Division	28	0	0	0	—		6 (Note: Four appearances one goal in Derbyshire Senior Cup; one appearance in FA Trophy; one appearance in Northern Premier League Challenge Cup)	1	34	1
Ilkeston	2014–15	Northern Premier League Premier Division	46	3	3	0	—		7 (Note: Three appearances in Northern Premier League Challenge Cup; two appearances in Northern Premier League Premier Division play-offs; one appearance in FA Trophy; one appearance in Derbyshire Senior Cup)	0	56	3
Ilkeston	Total		78	3	3	0	—		13	1	94	4
Nuneaton Town	2015–16	National League North	25	2	2	0	—		3 (Note: Two appearances one goal in FA Trophy; one appearance one goal in Birmingham Senior Cup)	2	30	4
Peterborough United	2015–16	League One	5	0	0	0	—		—		5	0
Peterborough United	2016–17	League One	11	0	0	0	2	0	2 (Note: Appearance(s) in EFL Trophy)	0	15	0
Peterborough United	2017–18	League One	2	0	0	0	0	0	0	0	2	0
Peterborough United	Total		18	0	0	0	2	0	2	0	22	0
AFC Fylde (loan)	2017–18	National League	9	0	—		—		2 (Note: Appearance(s) in Lancashire Senior Cup)	1	11	1
Alfreton Town	2018–19	National League North	16	2	1	0	—		0	0	17	2
Boston United (loan)	2018–19	National League North	2	0	—		—		—		2	0
Matlock Town (loan)	2018–19	Northern Premier League Premier Division	7	2	—		—		—		7	2
Basford United	2019–20	Northern Premier League Premier Division	30	0	1	0	—		2 (Note: Appearance(s) in FA Trophy)	0	33	0
Basford United	2020–21	Northern Premier League Premier Division	7	1	1	0	—		4	2	12	3
Basford United	2021–22	Northern Premier League Premier Division	6	0	0	0	—		0	0	6	0
Basford United	Total		43	1	2	0	—		6	2	51	3
Mickleover	2022–23	Southern League Premier Division Central	4	0	0	0	—		0	0	4	0
Nuneaton Borough	2023–24	Southern League Premier Division Central	—		0	0	—		1 (Note: Appearance(s) in Birmingham Senior Cup)	0	1	0
Mickleover (loan)	2023–24	Southern League Premier Division Central	2	0	0	0	—		2	0	4	0
Career total			204	10	8	0	2	0	29	6	243	16
