= Andrea Borg =

Maltese footballer (born 1999)

Personal information
- Full name: Andrea Borg
- Date of birth: 12 November 1999 (age 27)
- Place of birth: Sliema, Malta
- Positions: Midfielder; forward

Team information
- Current team: Seton Hall Pirates

Youth career
- 2008–2016: IJF Academy
- 2016–2017: Peterborough United

College career
Years	Team	Apps	(Gls)
2019–	Seton Hall Pirates	82	(11)

Senior career*
Years	Team	Apps	(Gls)
2017–2019	Peterborough United	3	(0)
2018	→ Kettering Town (loan)	18	(2)
2019	→ St Neots Town (loan)	3	(0)

International career^{‡}
2017–19	Malta U19	5	(1)
- * Club domestic league appearances and goals as of 30 April 2017 (UTC) ‡ National team caps and goals as of 25 October 2017 (UTC)

Andrea Borg (born 12 November 1999) is a Maltese footballer who plays as a midfielder or a forward for SHU Pirates. Borg was born in Malta and raised in Dubai. He is a youth international for Malta.

== Club career ==
On 10 April 2016, Borg joined League One side Peterborough United after a spell in Dubai with IJF Academy. On 25 March 2017, Borg was an unused substitute during Peterborough's 1–0 away victory against Gillingham. On 14 April 2017, Borg made his debut for Peterborough, in their 2–1 home defeat against Fleetwood Town, featuring for 82 minutes before being replaced by Paul Taylor. He made his FA Cup debut on 27 January 2018, coming on as a second-half substitute in their defeat to Leicester City.

On 10 August 2018, Borg joined Southern League Premier side Kettering Town on loan until January. In November, he was recalled from his loan after making 18 appearances at Kettering.

== Career statistics ==
As of match played 27 January 2018

Appearances and goals by club, season and competition
Club	Season	League			FA Cup		League Cup		Other		Total	
Club	Season	Division	Apps	Goals	Apps	Goals	Apps	Goals	Apps	Goals	Apps	Goals
Peterborough United	2016–17	League One	3	0	0	0	0	0	0	0	3	0
Peterborough United	2017–18	League One	0	0	1	0	0	0	0	0	1	0
Career total			3	0	1	0	0	0	0	0	4	0
