= Alex Penny =

Welsh footballer

Personal information
- Full name: Alexander James Robert Kevin Penny
- Date of birth: 16 February 1997 (age 29)
- Place of birth: Nuneaton, England
- Position: Defender

Team information
- Current team: Kidderminster Harriers
- Number: 2

Youth career
- –2015: Hull City

Senior career*
Years	Team	Apps	(Gls)
2015	Bedworth United	5	(0)
2015	Stourbridge	0	(0)
2015–2016	Hinckley	15	(2)
2016–2017	Nuneaton Town	24	(0)
2017–2018	Peterborough United	7	(0)
2018–2019	Hamilton Academical	8	(0)
2019–2020	Boston United	15	(0)
2020–	Kidderminster Harriers	106	(5)

International career
- Wales U16
- * Club domestic league appearances and goals as of 11:29, 2 April 2024 (UTC)

Alexander James Robert Kevin Penny (born 16 February 1997) is a professional footballer who plays as a defender for National League club Kidderminster Harriers.

== Early life ==
Penny was born in Nuneaton, Warwickshire, but moved away at a young age. He attended Withernsea High School from 2008 to 2013.

== Club career ==
Penny played for his local club Withernsea before joining Hull City's youth system aged 11. Despite being offered an extension to his scholarship in April 2015, he signed for Southern League Premier Division club Bedworth United in September. Having made five appearances, he signed for Northern Premier League Premier Division club Stourbridge later that month. In November 2015, Penny signed for Midland League Division One club Hinckley, after making two appearances for Stourbridge. He made 17 appearances and scored two goals for Hinckley in the 2015–16 season, the team finishing fifth in the Midland League Division One.

In June 2016, Penny signed for National League North club Nuneaton Town on a one-year contract. He made 28 appearances in 2016–17 as Nuneaton finished 12th in the National League North. He joined Jamie Vardy's V9 Academy, aimed at helping non-League players into professional football, and impressed Football League scouts during training matches at the City of Manchester Stadium in May 2017.

On 19 July 2017, Penny signed for League One club Peterborough United on a three-year contract after a successful trial. The undisclosed fee set a new record for a transfer fee received by Nuneaton. On 5 August 2017, he made his Football League debut as an 89th-minute substitute in Peterborough's 2–1 home win over Plymouth Argyle, on the opening day of 2017–18. He made his first start for the club three days later, playing the first 68 minutes of a 3–1 home defeat to Barnet in the EFL Cup.

On 6 June 2018, Penny signed for Scottish Premiership club Hamilton Academical for an undisclosed fee. His contract was mutually terminated in May 2019.

Penny signed for National League North club Kidderminster Harriers in February 2020 on a two-year contract. On 5 October 2021, Penny scored his first Kidderminster Harriers goal in a 3–0 home win against Ware FC in the FA Cup 3rd Qualifying round. On 5 February 2022, he scored the only Kidderminster goal against West Ham in the FA Cup fourth round and went on to extend his deal to the summer of 2023 in April 2022. Penny was subsequently named in the 2021-22 National League North Team of the Season. Following promotion back to the National league during the 2022/23 season, Penny signed a new one-year deal with Kidderminster running through till 2023/24 season

== International career ==
Penny was capped by the Wales national under-16 team, playing at the 2011 and 2012 Victory Shields.

== Career statistics ==
As of 6 April 2024

Appearances and goals by club, season and competition
Club	Season	League			FA Cup		EFL Cup		Other		Total	
Club	Season	Division	Apps	Goals	Apps	Goals	Apps	Goals	Apps	Goals	Apps	Goals
Bedworth United	2015–16	Southern League Premier Division	5	0	—		—		—		5	0
Stourbridge	2015–16	Northern Premier League Premier Division	0	0	—		—		2 (Note: One appearance in Birmingham Senior Cup, one in Northern Premier League Challenge Cup)	0	2	0
Hinckley	2015–16	Midland League Division One	15	2	—		—		2 (Note: One appearance in JW Hunt Cup, one in Coventry Charity Cup)	0	17	2
Nuneaton Town	2016–17	National League North	24	0	0	0	—		4 (Note: Two appearances in Birmingham Senior Cup, two in FA Trophy)	0	28	0
Peterborough United	2017–18	League One	7	0	2	0	1	0	1 (Note: Appearance in EFL Trophy)	0	11	0
Hamilton Academical	2018–19	Scottish Premiership	8	0	0	0	3	0	—		11	0
Boston United	2019–20	National League North	15	0	0	0	0	0	—		15	0
Kidderminster Harriers	2020–21	National League North	13	0	0	0	0	0	—		13	0
Kidderminster Harriers	2021–22	National League North	36	4	4	1	0	0	—		40	5
Kidderminster Harriers	2022–23	National League North	21	0	0	0	0	0	—		21	0
Kidderminster Harriers	2023–24	National League	35	1	1	0	0	0	—		36	1
Kidderminster Harriers	Total		105	5	5	1	0	0	0	0	110	6
Career total			177	7	7	1	4	0	9	0	199	8

== Honours ==
Kidderminster Harriers

- National League North Team of the Season: 2021-22
- National League North play-offs: 2022-23
