= Nuneaton Town F.C. =

Association football club in Nuneaton, England

Nuneaton Town FC
- Full name: Nuneaton Town Football Club
- Nickname: The Boro
- Founded: 1889 (as Nuneaton St. Nicholas); 1937 (as Nuneaton Borough F.C.); 1991 (reformed as Nuneaton Borough 1991 F.C.); 2008 (reformed as Nuneaton Town F.C.); 2024 (reformed as Nuneaton Town F.C.)
- Ground: The Oval (Groundshare with Bedworth United from 2024)
- Capacity: 3,000 (300 seated)
- Owner: Nuneaton Town FC CIC
- Chairman: Ian Cook
- Manager: Darren Acton & Russell Dodds
- League: Northern Premier League Division One Midlands
- 2025–26: United Counties League Premier Division South, 1st of 20 (promoted)
- Website: nuneatontownfc.co.uk
Home colours	Away colours

Nuneaton Town Football Club is an English football club that is based in Bedworth, Warwickshire.

In 1889, Nuneaton St. Nicholas FC was the first team in Nuneaton to play senior football. In 1894, the 'Nicks' changed their name to Nuneaton Town Association Football Club, which they played under until 1937 when the club was disbanded. Two days later, the club was reformed as Nuneaton Borough F.C. and played under this name until 1991, when the club liquidated for the first time. After the club reformed, they changed their name to Nuneaton Borough 1991 F.C. During this time, the club had some historic cup victories including a 1–0 win over Division 2 side Stoke City in 2000, and in 2006, they scored a late equaliser at home to Premier league and UEFA Cup side Middlesbrough. Then, in 2008, the club was liquidated due to poor financial performance. It was renamed Nuneaton Town and suffered a two-division demotion. During the 2018–19 season, the club reverted to its former name Nuneaton Borough F.C. after overwhelming support for the change from supporters.

The club used to play its home fixtures at Liberty Way, Nuneaton. The club's home colours are blue and white, which are usually represented as vertical stripes. The club is known to some supporters as 'The Boro'.

Local rivals include Tamworth, Leamington, and Bedworth United.

== Club history ==
=== Original club: 1889–1937 ===
==== Nuneaton St. Nicolas / Nuneaton Town ====
The club began in 1889 when young men from Nuneaton St. Nicolas Parish Church formed a football team to represent the town. Originally playing only friendly games, in September 1894 the 'Nicks' changed their name to Nuneaton Town Association F.C.

==== League record ====
- 1894–95: Warwickshire Junior League;
- 1896–97: Coventry & District League;
- 1897–99: Coventry and North Warwickshire League;
- 1899–1900: Leicestershire League;
- 1901–03: Nuneaton & District League;
- 1903–04: Trent Valley League;
- 1904–06: Coventry and North Warwickshire League;
- 1906–15: Birmingham Junior League / Birmingham Combination (renamed 1908);
- 1915–19: competition suspended due to World War One;
- 1919–24: Birmingham League;
- 1924–26: Southern League (Eastern Section);
- 1926–33: Birmingham Combination;
- 1933–37: Birmingham League.

==== Major honours ====
League:

- Coventry & District League: Champions 1902–03; Runners Up 1901–02;
- Coventry & North Warwickshire League: Champions 1904–05; Runners Up 1897–98;
- Birmingham Junior League: Champions 1906–07;
- Birmingham Combination: Champions 1914–15, 1928–29, 1930–31; Runners Up 1910–11, 1931–32

Cup:

- Birmingham Senior (County) Cup: First entered 1911–12; Winners 1930–31; Runners Up 1934–35

==== End of Nuneaton Borough F.C. ====
In 1936, the club sold its Manor Park ground to Nuneaton Corporation. On 13 May 1937, at an extraordinary general meeting of shareholders, it was decided to shut down the football club despite it being financially sound.

=== Second incarnation: 1937–2008 ===
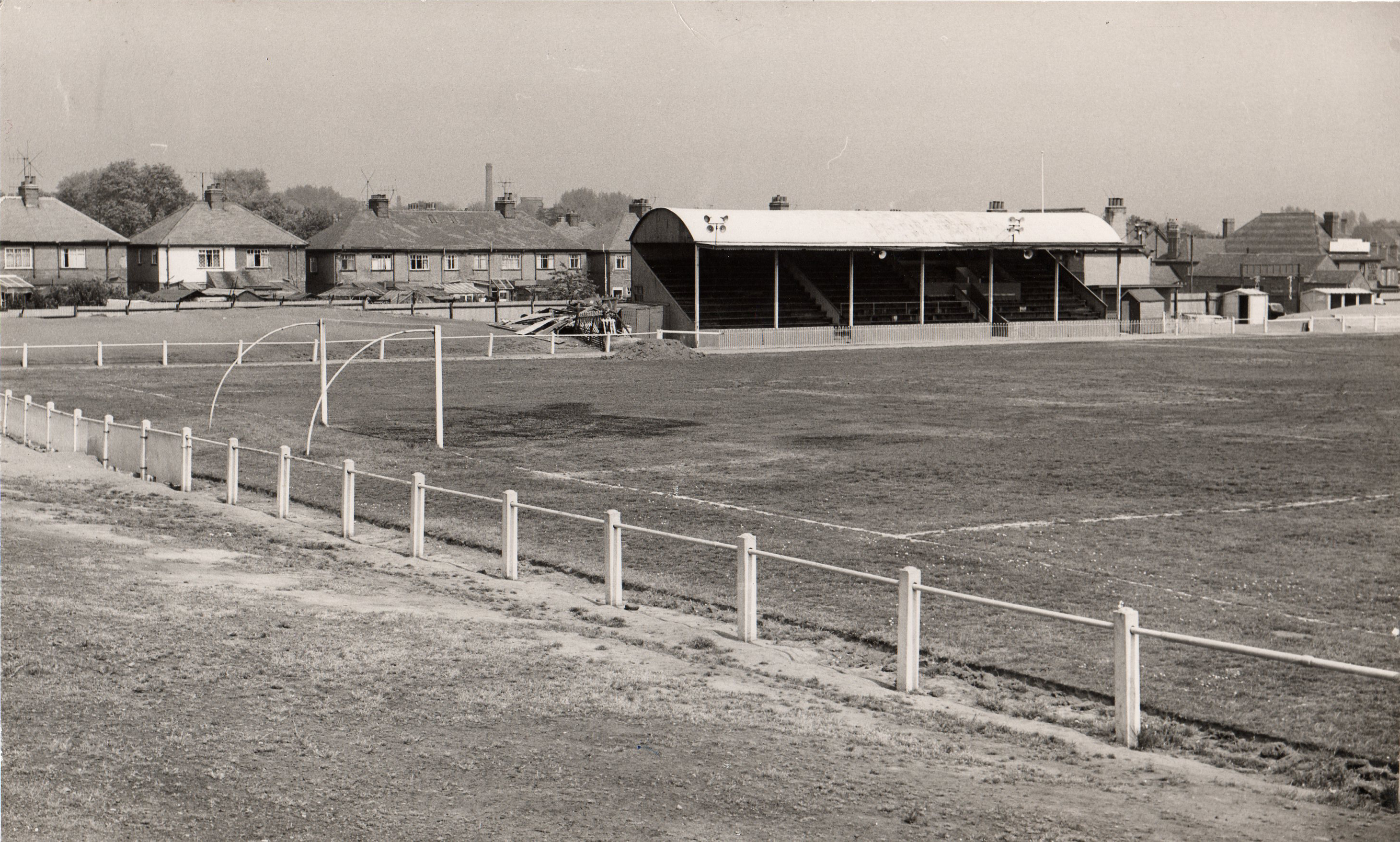
Old Main Stand at Manor Park

==== Nuneaton Borough ====
Following the disbanding of the club, a new group of young Gentlemen decided to reform it two days later. The club played at a new ground, Manor Park (1937–2007) and Liberty Way (2007–2008). The club nickname became established as 'The Boro'.

==== League record ====
- 1937–38: Central Amateur League;
- 1938–40: Birmingham Combination;
- 1941–45: Second World War (Boro' enter the Nuneaton Combination);
- 1945–52: Birmingham Combination;
- 1952–54: Birmingham League;
- 1954–55: Birmingham League North;
- 1955–58: Birmingham League First Division;
- 1958–59: Southern League – North Western Section;
- 1959–60: Southern League – Premier Division;
- 1960–63: Southern League – First Division;
- 1963–79: Southern League – Premier Division;
- 1979–81: Alliance Premier;
- 1981–82: Southern League – First Division;
- 1982–87: Alliance Premier / Football Conference (renamed 1986);
- 1987–88: Southern League – Premier Division;
- 1988–93: Southern League Midland Division;
- 1993–94: Southern League – Premier Division;
- 1994–96: Southern League – Midland Division;
- 1996–99: Southern League – Premier Division;
- 1999–2003: Football Conference;
- 2004–08: Conference North.

==== Major honours ====
League

- Birmingham Combination: Runners Up 1945–46, 1948–49, 1950–51;
- Birmingham League: Champions 1954–55 (North), 1955–56 (Division One);
- Southern League Premier Division: Champions 1998–99, Runners Up 1966–67, 1974–75;
- Southern League Midland Division: Champions 1981–82, 1992–93, 1995–96;
- Conference Premier: Runners Up 1983–84, 1984–85;
- Conference North: Runners Up 2004–05

Cup

- Birmingham Senior (County) Cup: Winners 1949, 1955, 1960, 1978, 1980, 1993, 2002; Runners Up 1953, 1967, 1991.
- Southern League Cup: Winners 1995–96; Runners Up 1962–63;
- Southern League Championship Match (League Champions v Cup Winners): Winners 199?, Runners Up 1996;

==== Record attendance ====
- Home: At Manor Park 22,114 (28 January 1967 v Rotherham United at Manor Park in the F.A. Cup third round).
- Away: 26,255 (17 January 2006 v Middlesbrough at the Riverside Stadium in the F.A. Cup third round (replay)).

==== Key events ====
In March 1983, George Best played for Nuneaton Borough in a friendly match against Coventry City and scored from a penalty.

In May 2007, the club left its Manor Park ground after drawing its last game 1–1 against Vauxhall Motors.

In the 2007–08 season, ill-health meant the club's owner Ted Stocker decided to sell his shares. In March 2008, local businessman Ian Neale took ownership of the club for a trial period. He eventually took 100% ownership of the club in April of that year, but in May Neale found irregularities in the club finances, raising fears that the club would be forced into administration. On 2 June 2008, Nuneaton Borough went into liquidation.

=== Third incarnation: 2008–2024 ===
==== Nuneaton Town F.C. ====
The club was once again reformed, but the FA insisted that it revert to its former name of Nuneaton Town. Falling foul of financial regulations the club was demoted two divisions, from Conference North to Southern League Division One, although the club was promoted back to its former division over the following two seasons. The club continued to be known by its former nickname, "The Boro"

==== Nuneaton Borough ====
On 30 April 2018, it was announced the club would be renamed Nuneaton Borough F.C. and it was officially renamed on 16 June 2018.

==== League record ====
- 2008–09: Southern League Division One;
- 2009–10: Southern League Premier Division;
- 2010–12: Conference North;
- 2012–15: Conference Premier;
- 2015–19: National League North;
- 2019–24: Southern League Premier Division

==== Major honours ====
League

- Southern League Division One (Midlands): Runners Up 2008–09 (promoted via play-offs).
- Southern League Premier Division: Runners Up 2009–10 (promoted via play-offs).
- Conference North 2011–12 (promoted via play-offs).

Cup

- Birmingham Senior Cup: Winners 2010.

==== Record attendance ====
- Home: 4,054 v Stockport County (27 April 2019, National League North).

==== Key events ====
The club was relegated to the Southern League Midlands Division in the 2008–09 season but made an immediate return to the Southern League Premier Division the following season with a 1–0 play-off final victory over Chasetown at Liberty Way.

In the Southern League Premier Division, Nuneaton found themselves facing several teams that were chasing promotion. After a slow start, the team went on a run that saw them beaten once at home and included a run of 14 straight victories. A 24-point gap between the leaders Farnborough was narrowed to two points at the end of the season. Nuneaton had some success in the FA Cup and FA Trophy but ended the second week in March with a backlog of eight games in hand over their top-six rivals. Nuneaton pursued Farnborough and had a schedule of ten games in twenty-four days, including two games in twenty-four hours.

A 6–0 defeat of Brackley Town in the semi-final saw home advantage given to Nuneaton who faced Chippenham. The final went into extra time and local player Eddie Nisevic scored the winning goal, returning Nuneaton to the Conference North. Three days after the play-off final, Nuneaton beat Alvechurch to win the Birmingham Senior Cup. Only Premier League club Aston Villa has won the cup more times than Nuneaton, which has won the trophy in every decade since the Second World War.

Nuneaton returned to the Conference North and the opening game and crowd average was around 1,000. Nuneaton started well and remained in the top six up until Christmas, where they gained top spot until the last week in March. After other clubs played their games in hand, Nuneaton finished just outside the play-offs but the club above them, Eastwood Town, were prevented from taking part in the playoffs due to a technical problem. Nuneaton faced A.F.C. Telford United in the first leg and led until the 93rd minute when the away side drew level. In the second tie, Telford took the lead but defended for the second half. Nuneaton lost to Telford, which was eventually promoted into the Conference Premier.

The 2011–12 season saw Nuneaton gain promotion back to the Conference Premier for the first time in 10 years. After maintaining a high league position throughout the season, in its last few weeks an administrative error led to a six-point deduction but a final day 3–2 victory at Blyth Spartans ensured their play-off place. A semi-final 2nd-leg victory over Guiseley with a goal from Andy Brown in the last minute of extra time meant that Boro had to travel to Gainsborough Trinity for the Play-Off Final. Again Brown scored the goal that saw Boro claim a 1–0 victory. The club's promotion was its third in four seasons since the reformation.

The 2012–13 season saw Nuneaton play against the country's non-league elite. Despite spending much of the season in and around the relegation zone a run towards the end of the season saw the club finish in 15th place.

The 2013–14 season, Nuneaton led the table early on and in and around the play-offs for most of the season. Following manager Kevin Wilkin's departure for Wrexham, results tailed off in the last month but they finished in 13th position. A new manager, Brian Reid, was appointed and oversaw the last three games of the season.

The 2014–15 season saw Lee Thorn invest in the club, becoming chairman. His investment allowed the club to regain ownership of the stadium. On 8 September, following a poor start to the 2014–15 season, Reid was let go following a number of poor results and performances. Liam Daish was appointed manager but the club was relegated to the newly renamed National League North.

The 2015–16 pre-season saw Lee Thorn taking full control of the club and Kevin Wilson named as manager.

In October 2023, the club were issued with an eviction notice with debts of around £650,000 and bosses claiming that the club had been behind in rent payments since 2019. This eviction notice led the club to having to play what they feared to be their last ever match at the home of Stratford Town, however the club could afford to play a further two away matches thanks to the efforts of supporters. On 23 November 2023, the club confirmed that they had been taken over by DA Capital. On 18 January 2024, the club confirmed their withdrawal from the Southern Football League Premier Division Central for the remainder of the season. Following advice from their legal advisors that their offer to purchase the stadium would not be considered and that a lease agreement could not be reached, investors had pulled out any financial support, meaning the club would be unable to continue trading.

=== Current incarnation: 2024–present ===
Ahead of the 2024–25 season, the club joined Division One of the Midland Football League as Nuneaton Town. During their first season, the club were promoted to the Premier Division as champions.

==== League record ====
- 2024–25: Midland League Division One

==== Major honours ====
League

- Midland Football League Division One: Champions 2024–25

== Cup competitions ==
=== FA Cup ===
Nuneaton Town first entered the FA Cup in 1899 but never progressed to the competition proper. Nuneaton Borough has achieved this twenty-one times, including victories over Football League sides Watford, Swansea City (twice), Oxford United and most recently Stoke City.

Nuneaton Borough have progressed to the FA Cup third round proper in 1949–50, 1966–67 and 2005–06. For their 1966–67 run, crowd of 22,114 was in attendance at the Manor Park ground on 28 January 1967 when Rotherham United were held to a draw in a Third Round tie. Rotherham beat Boro 1–0 at Millmoor in the rematch.

Middlesbrough visited Manor Park on 7 January 2006, and could only achieve a 1–1 draw with Nuneaton, Gez Murphy scoring an equalising penalty in the 90th minute to the delight of the home crowd, earning Nuneaton a replay against a Premier League side approximately 100 places above them. Middlesbrough won the replay at the Riverside Stadium 5–2. Gez Murphy scored twice in this fixture, therefore scoring 3 goals against Middlesbrough over the two games.

Other giant killings of note came against Stoke City in 2000, Marc McGregor with a 90th-minute winner, and in 1993 a win over Swansea City, with Tony Simpson netting both goals.

The club made its first appearance in the FA Cup first round in its current guise of Nuneaton Town, on 7 November 2009 when they entertained Exeter City. This was also the first time that Liberty Way had hosted a game in the FA Cup competition proper. The game ended with Exeter City winning 4–0. In 2010 they also reached the first round of the Cup with an away tie against Lincoln City, but were once again beaten from an 89th-minute strike leaving the score at 1–0. They reached the first round proper once again on 3 November 2012 facing Luton Town and forcing a replay after a 1–1 draw. However, on 13 November they lost the replay 2–0.

=== F.A. Trophy ===
Nuneaton Borough's best run has seen them reach the quarter-final three times: In 1977 (a replay), in 1980 and 1987. They endured an awful run in the competition between 1995 and 2006 however. In this time they did not win a single FA Trophy game. In 2006 the run ended with a win at Bradford Park Avenue. The previous win was in 1995 at Spennymoor United.

=== Birmingham Senior Cup ===
The Boro won the Birmingham Senior Cup for the first time in 1931 and have won it a total of nine times since, most recently in 2010.

== Ground ==
=== Pre-1919 ===
The club played on various fields from 1889 to 1903 located at Higham Lane, Rose Inn (Coton Road), Arbury Road (later renamed Queens Road) and Edward Street. The turn of the century saw the Boro moved to enclosed grounds at Queens Road 1903–08, Newdigate Arms 1908–15 and then Manor Park.

=== Manor Park (1919–2007) ===
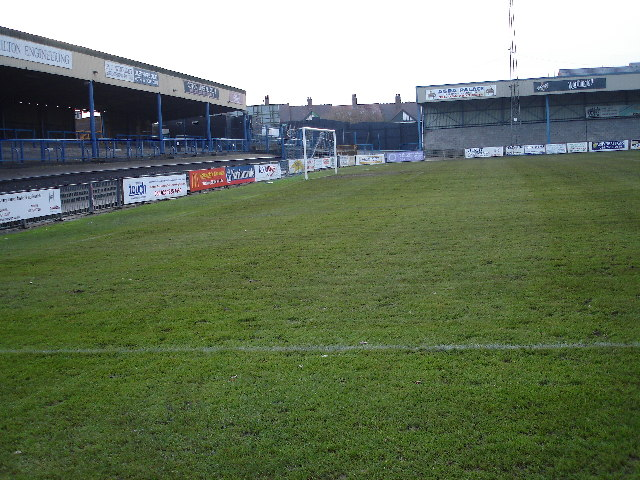
Nuneaton's former home ground, Manor Park

From the club's early years until 2007 Boro played at Manor Park; a 6,000 capacity stadium at the time of its closure. The record attendance was 22,114 spectators who had packed into the ground for an FA Cup tie against Rotherham United in 1967.

The club played their final game at Manor Park, on 28 April 2007, in a 1–1 draw with Vauxhall Motors. Gez Murphy scored Boro's last goal at the ground from the penalty spot.

The stadium has now been knocked down and has been redeveloped for housing by former shirt sponsors Bloor Homes.

=== Liberty Way (2007–2024) ===
Nuneaton Borough moved into its new ground, Liberty Way, in time for the 2007–08 season. The ground was initially owned and purpose-built by Nuneaton Rugby Club, which now shares the ground. As a consequence of the decision to move, the ground was substantially upgraded. The upgrade took place over three phases by local building firm Ian Neale Construction (owned by future owner Ian Neale) and was completed in 2007.

The move to Liberty Way was not straightforward. Originally the club planned to move from Manor Park to the new ground for the 2005–06 season but ended up having to wait two seasons before work was completed. The club also encountered a setback over the covenant protecting Manor Park which was eventually cleared, allowing the club could move to Liberty Way. The ground-share plan with Nuneaton R.F.C. was planned by the then owner Ted Stocker of both clubs, after many new ground plans across Nuneaton were rejected by the local council. As a consequence of the ground share, ownership of the ground passed from the rugby club to a new holding company, Stadiasafe.

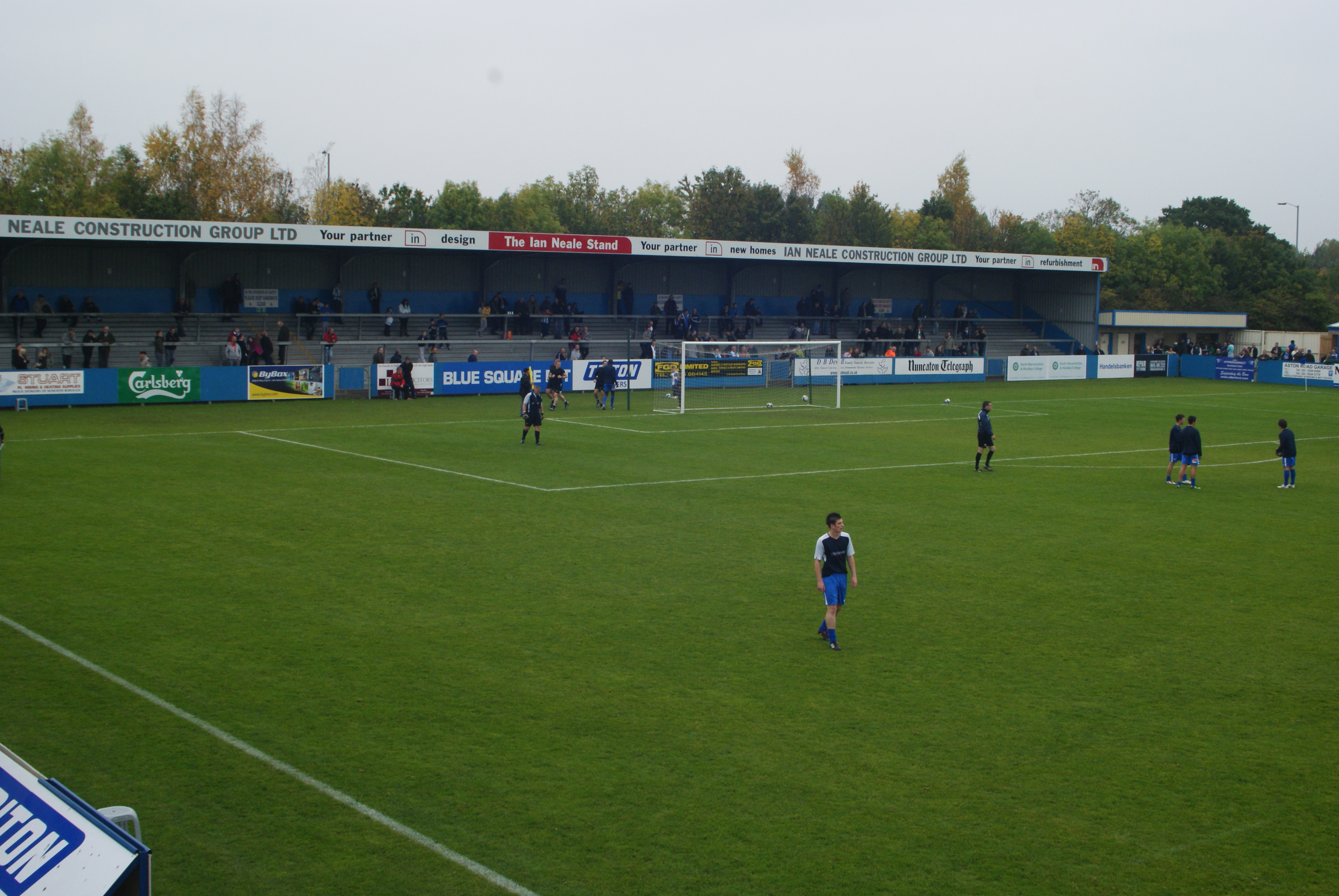
Liberty Way, Nuneaton

The ground share with Nuneaton Rugby Club ('The Nuns') effectively died with the liquidation of Stadiasafe, leaving no formal agreement in place between the two clubs. Having gained sole ownership of the ground, Nuneaton Town Football Club put a deal on the table that would allow the rugby club to play inside the stadium in return for a realistic rate. Under the old agreement, the rugby club paid £35 to hire the pitch, a fee that also covered the use of the floodlights and markings. Since this was previously paid to a sister company (the aforementioned Stadiasafe; owned by the owner of both clubs), the amount paid was immaterial. However, when the football club gained sole ownership, this sparked disagreements over the amount to be paid to the football club by the rugby club to play its games in the stadium.

At the start of the 2010–11 season, a deal was struck with the Nuns where the rugby club was able to play several games per season inside the stadium.

The club completed a permanent seated stand for 514 supporters on the north side of the stadium, which has improved the stadium in line with the standards required for participation in the Conference Premier. They have also outlined plans to extend this stand by adding a further 500 or so seats in the future. Facilities ancillary to football and the club's community initiatives will be housed in a two-storey building behind the new stand, adjacent to the remembrance garden for families of the people who had their ashes scattered at Manor Park.

In March 2013 Liberty Way underwent ground improvements to meet new regulations, turnstiles, changing rooms and the players' tunnel were all upgraded.

In July 2013 it was announced that the stadium would be known as the "Sperrin Brewery Stadium" for the 2013–14 season after a local family-run business won the naming rights in a golden ticket draw. For the 2014–15 season, following the second 'golden ticket draw', the ground was named the JDRF James Parnell Stadium.

On 12 February 2019, chairman Nick Hawkins stepped down after just three-months at the club.

In late 2023 the club were locked out of Liberty Way, The club was also given permission to play an FA Trophy tie against AFC Fylde at Coventry City's CBS Arena free of charge.

In January 2024 an agreement to secure a new lease for Nuneaton Borough at Liberty Way could not be reached which resulted in the club resigning their place in the Southern Central Premier League and exploring the liquidation process. The club alleged that no new lease would be given to any future entity of Nuneaton Borough and as a result Liberty Way ceased to become the club's home.

=== The Oval (2024–) ===
Following Nuneaton Borough's eviction from Liberty Way, the club were forced to play their home games away from Nuneaton. The club played one home game at Hinckley Leicester Road and then later Stratford Town. In December 2023 it was agreed the club would play all of their home games at Barwell's Kirby Road home until the end of March 2024. However, in January 2024 due to financial problems the club choose to quit the Southern League in mid-season, raising doubts over the future of the football club.

Following resignation from the league, it was announced the club planned to go into liquidation, along with a plan to reform a new club in the lower leagues. It was announced that a new club would be formed and named 'Nuneaton FC'. At present it is not known which level the new club will be placed in. However it was announced in February 2024 the new club will be playing their home games at The Oval of Bedworth United FC, part of a two-year deal with an option of a third year. With plans to build a new stadium within the town on site of the Gala Fields in Nuneaton. In addition it was confirmed that it was unlikely that their former home of Liberty Way would host any football matches in the near future.

== Current squad ==
As of 23 August 2026

Note: Flags indicate national team as defined under FIFA eligibility rules; some limited exceptions apply. Players may hold more than one non-FIFA nationality.

No.	Pos.	Nation	Player
—	GK	ENG	Brandon Bache
—	GK	ENG	Finn Osborn
—	DF	ENG	Harry Chesterton
—	DF	WAL	Josh Green
—	DF	ENG	Aaron Roberts
—	DF	ENG	Luke Softley
—	DF	ENG	Kai Thomas
—	MF	ENG	James Armson
—	MF	ENG	Corey Currithers
—	MF	ENG	Caine Elliott

No.	Pos.	Nation	Player
—	MF	ENG	Dante Hesson
—	MF	ENG	Charlie Jones
—	MF	ENG	Declan Somel
—	FW	ENG	Terry Atem
—	FW	ENG	James Harrison
—	FW	ENG	Stuart Hendrie
—	FW	ENG	Liam Murphy
—	FW	ENG	Eesa Sawyers
—	FW	ENG	Jay Snook (on loan from Shrewsbury Town)
—	FW	ENG	Bradley Stretton

== Top scorers ==
5 players have scored over 100 competitive goals for the club;

- Ken Plant
- Paul Culpin
- Martyn Twigger
- Paul Cutler
- Rob Straw

== Managers ==
- John Barton: 1992–1994
- Elwyn Roberts: 1994–1995
- Brendon Phillips: 1995–2000
- Steve Burr: 2000–2003
- Alan Lewer: 2003–2004
- Roger Ashby: 2004–2006
- Kevin Wilkin: 2006–2014
- Brian Reid: 2014
- Liam Daish: 2014–2015
- Kevin Wilson: 2015–2016
- Tommy Wright: 2016–2017
- Dino Maamria: 2017–2018
- Gary Charles: 2018
- Nicky Eaden: 2018
- Lee Fowler: 2018
- Jimmy Ginnelly: 2018–2024
- Kyle Storer: 2024
- Russell Dodd and Darren Acton: 2024-

== Seasons ==
Below are the ten most recent Nuneaton Town seasons.

Year	League	Level	P	W	D	L	F	A	GD	Pts	Position	Leading league scorer	Goals	FA Cup	FA Trophy	Average attendance
2007–08	Conference North	6	42	19	14	9	58	40	+18	71	7th of 22; Liquidated and reformed	Andy Brown	No Data	QR4	QR3	No Data
2008–09	SFL Division One Midlands	8	42	28	8	6	85	31	+54	92	2nd of 22; Promoted via play-offs	Gez Murphy	No Data	QR2	PR	No Data
2009–10	SFL Premier Division	7	42	26	10	6	91	37	+54	88	2nd of 22; Promoted via play-offs	Chris Dillion	No Data	R1	R1	No Data
2010–11	Conference North	6	40	21	9	10	66	44	+22	72	6th of 22; Lost in play-off semi-final	Kyle Storer	No Data	R1	QR3	No Data
2011–12	Conference North	6	42	22	12	8	74	41	+33	72 ^{†}	5th of 22; Promoted via play-offs ^{†}	Danny Glover	No Data	QR4	R1	No Data
2012–13	Conference Premier	5	46	14	15	17	55	63	−8	57	15th of 24	Andy Brown	19	R1	R1	No Data
2013–14	Conference Premier	5	46	18	12	16	54	60	−6	66	13th of 24	Louis Moult	17	QR4	R2	No Data
2014–15	Conference Premier	5	46	10	9	27	38	76	−38	36 ^{††}	24th of 24; Relegated ^{††}	Andy Brown	8	QR4	R1	No Data
2015–16	National League North	6	42	20	13	9	71	46	+25	70 ^{†††}	6th of 22 ^{†††}	Aaron Williams	15	QR3	R1	No Data
2016–17	National League North	6	42	14	13	15	67	69	−2	55	12th of 22	Joe Ironside	20	QR2	R3	No Data
2017–18	National League North	6	42	14	13	15	50	57	−7	55	13th of 22	Ashley Chambers	19	QR3	R1	No Data

^{†} Nuneaton Town deducted 6 points for fielding an ineligible player.
^{††} Nuneaton Town deducted 3 points for fielding an ineligible player.
^{†††} Nuneaton Town deducted 3 points for fielding an ineligible player in their win over Corby Town on 27 February 2016. They would have finished in 4th place and a play-off position without this points deduction.

== Honours ==
League

- Alliance Premier League
  - Runners-up: 1983–84, 1984–85
- Conference North
  - Runners-up: 2004–05
  - Play-off winners: 2012
- Southern League Premier Division
  - Champions: 1998–99
  - Runners-up: 1966–67, 1974–75
  - Play-off winners: 2010
- Southern League Midland Division
  - Champions: 1981–82, 1992–93, 1995–96
  - Play-off winners: 2009
- Midland Football League Division One
  - Champions: 2024–25
- United Counties Football League Premier Division South **Champions: 2025–26
- Birmingham League
  - Champions: 1954–55, 1955–56
- Birmingham Combination
  - Champions: 1914–15, 1928–29, 1930–31
  - Runners-up: 1910–11, 1931–32, 1945–46, 1948–49, 1950–51
- Birmingham Junior League
  - Champions: 1906–07
- Coventry & North Warwickshire League
  - Champions: 1904–05
  - Runners-up: 1897–98
- Nuneaton & District League
  - Champions: 1902–03
  - Runners-up: 1901–02

Cup

- Southern League Cup
  - Winners: 1995–96
  - Runners-up: 1962–63
- Birmingham Senior Cup
  - Winners: 1930–31, 1948–49, 1955–56, 1959–60, 1977–78, 1979–80, 1992–93, 2001–02, 2009–10
  - Runners-up: 1934–35, 1952–53, 1966–67, 1990–91, 2010–11, 2014–15, 2018–9
- Birmingham League (Maserfield Cup)
  - Runners-up: 1952–53, 1954–55
- Midland Floodlit Cup
  - Winners: 1968–69, 1973–74, 1979–80, 1983–84 (joint)
  - Runners-up: 1982–83, 1984–85, 1990–91, 2024–25

== Records ==
- Best League Position
  - 2nd Southern League Premier Division (Level 5) – 1966–67, 1974–75
  - 2nd Alliance Premier League (Level 5) – 1983–84, 1984–85
- Best FA Cup performance: 3rd Round
  - 1949–50 (vs. Exeter City)
  - 1966–67 (vs. Rotherham United)
  - 2005–06 (vs. Middlesbrough)
- Best FA Trophy performance: Quarter Final
  - 1976–77 (vs. Scarborough)
  - 1979–80 (vs. Dagenham)
  - 1986–87 (vs. Dartford)
- Best FA Vase performance: 3rd round
  - 2025–26 (ongoing; vs. Sandiacre Town)
- Record Attendance
  - Manor Park – 22,114 (28 January 1967 v Rotherham United, F.A. Cup third round)
  - Liberty Way – 4,054 (27 April 2019 v Stockport County, National League North)
- Record Signing
  - Marc McGregor – £35,000 from Forest Green Rovers, June 2000
- Record Sale
  - Andy Ducros – £100,000 to Kidderminster Harriers, July 2000

== Former players ==
1. Players that have played/managed in the Football League or any foreign equivalent to this level (i.e. fully professional league).
2. Players with full international caps.
3. Players that hold a club record. David Pleat (player/manager) 1974–1976

- (England) Malcolm Christie
- (England) Callum Chettle
- (Republic of Ireland) Cyrus Christie
- (England) Paul Culpin
- (England) Mike Deakin
- (England) Peter Deakin
- (England) Richard Hill
- (England) Lee Howey
- (England) Joe McClure (player-manager)
- (Republic of Ireland) Eddie McGoldrick
- (England) Trevor Morley
- (England) Louis Moult
- (Wales) Alex Penny
- (England) Dean Smith
- (England) Norman Whitfield
- (England) Aaron Williams
