= Marcus Maddison =

English footballer (born 1993)

Personal information
- Full name: Marcus Harley Maddison
- Date of birth: 26 September 1993 (age 33)
- Place of birth: Durham, England
- Height: 5 ft 11 in (1.80 m)
- Positions: Winger; attacking midfielder

Youth career
- 2011–2012: Newcastle United

Senior career*
Years	Team	Apps	(Gls)
2012–2013	Newcastle United	0	(0)
2012	→ Blyth Spartans (loan)	2	(1)
2013	St Johnstone	0	(0)
2013–2014	Gateshead	34	(13)
2014–2020	Peterborough United	212	(52)
2020	→ Hull City (loan)	7	(1)
2020–2021	Charlton Athletic	8	(1)
2021	→ Bolton Wanderers (loan)	10	(0)
2021	Spalding United	4	(2)
2022	Darlington	5	(0)
Total		282	(70)

International career
2014	England C	2	(0)
- * Club domestic league appearances and goals as of 23:53, 16 October 2022 (UTC)

Marcus Harley Maddison (born 26 September 1993) is an English former footballer who played as a winger or attacking midfielder.

Maddison began his career at Newcastle United, but did not play a senior game for the club. He was signed by Blyth Spartans and St Johnstone, before scoring 13 Conference Premier goals for Gateshead in a 12-month period from August 2013. He was signed by Peterborough United for an undisclosed fee in August 2014. The same year, he was also capped by England C.

After a brief loan spell at Hull City in 2020, Maddison joined Charlton Athletic on a free transfer, but struggled to make consistent appearances and was loaned out to Bolton Wanderers in 2021. After his loan was cut short in April 2021, Maddison announced his decision to quit professional football after expressing his diminished enjoyment in the sport, along with the negative effect his career was having on his wellbeing. He subsequently had spells for non-league sides Spalding United and Darlington before leaving the latter by mutual agreement in October 2022.

== Playing career ==
=== Early career ===
Maddison began his career at Newcastle United. He was loaned out to Blyth Spartans in November 2012 to gain experience, where he scored once in two appearances. He was released by Newcastle in 2013, with Reserve team manager Willie Donachie saying he had "a lot to learn". He went on to join St Johnstone on 8 March 2013.

=== Gateshead ===
After failing to make an appearance at St Johnstone, Maddison signed with Conference Premier club Gateshead in August 2013 following a successful trial. He was named as Conference Premier Player of the Month in January 2014. He saw a reignition to his career and scored 13 league goals for Gateshead in 34 league appearances.

=== Peterborough ===
After scoring 4 goals in his first 5 games of the 2014–15 season for Gateshead, he was signed by Peterborough United in August 2014 for an undisclosed fee, signing a four-year contract; manager Darren Ferguson said that "he has good balance, skill, pace and we feel this could be a good signing". The fee was a club-record for Gateshead (reported as £250,000 with the potential to rise to £500,000), and manager Gary Mills said "he was a good player but could be selfish at times".

In October 2014, Maddison won the Football League Young Player of the month after scoring 4 goals in 5 games. He was given a red card in a 1–0 victory against Leyton Orient on 7 March 2015. In his first season at the club he scored 8 goals in 30 games in all competitions. On 31 August 2017, Maddison signed a new three-year deal at Peterborough United.

Maddison scored 12 goals and made 22 assists in all competitions during the 2017–18 season. In April 2018 he was nominated for the EFL League One Player of the Season award, alongside teammate Jack Marriott. On 30 April, Maddison won the Peterborough United Goal Of The Season Award. On 10 May 2018, Maddison was placed on the transfer list by owner Darragh MacAnthony, who as part of an agreement said that as part of Maddison's new contract in 2017, if Peterborough United failed to get promotion he would allow him to leave.

Maddison had a contract option exercised by Peterborough United at the end of the 2018–19 season.

In June 2019, Maddison was linked with a transfer to Hull City, to join up with former Peterborough manager Grant McCann and defender Ryan Tafazolli.

On 12 June 2020, Maddison was released by Peterborough United. In his six years at the club he played 240 games and scored 62 goals in all competitions.

On 8 August 2020, after being released by Peterborough, Maddison played in a friendly match for local side Peterborough Sports against Yaxley F.C. to regain and maintain his fitness while he looked for a new club. Maddison played the first 45 minutes before being replaced by Josh Moreman, who scored the only goal for Peterborough Sports later in the match. The match ended 1–0.

==== Hull City (loan) ====
Maddison signed a six-month loan deal with Hull City on 31 January 2020. He made his debut for Hull on 1 February 2020, when he came on as a substitute for Mallik Wilks in the 1–5 home defeat to Brentford. He scored his first goal for the club on 14 February 2020 when he scored Hull's second goal in a 4–4 draw against Swansea City.

=== Charlton Athletic ===
On 1 October 2020, Maddison joined Charlton Athletic on a one-year deal with the option of a second year. He scored his first goal for Charlton in an EFL Trophy tie against Leyton Orient on 10 November 2020.

On 18 May 2021, it was announced that Maddison would leave Charlton Athletic at the end of his contract.

==== Bolton Wanderers (loan) ====
On 1 February 2021, Maddison joined Bolton Wanderers on loan for the rest of the 2020–21 season. His debut came on 9 February as a substitute against as Morecambe, however he was sent off after 12 minutes. The match ended 1–1, Morecambe's goal coming shortly after his red card. Bolton successfully appealed against the sending off, meaning he would miss no matches.

On 12 April 2021, it was announced by Bolton Wanderers that Maddison's loan spell would be cut short having made 10 first-team appearances for the club without scoring. In an Instagram post released a few hours later, Maddison admitted that he was considering ending his footballing career altogether, stating "the abuse, pressure and monotony has just got to me" and expressed his current lack of enjoyment in the sport. Maddison later confirmed his decision to end his professional football career in another Instagram post.

=== Spalding United ===
On 18 May 2021, Maddison joined eighth-tier club Spalding United, managed by former-Peterborough teammate Gabriel Zakuani. He made his debut on 14 August, scoring in a 2–1 win against Loughborough Dynamo. In February 2022, having previously suffered a possible career ending injury, he set up a GoFundMe in an attempt to fund a surgery in the hopes it would help him continue his career. He reached the target in less than 24 hours.

=== Darlington ===
In June 2022, Maddison joined National League North club Darlington. On 13 October, he left by mutual consent.

== Style of play ==
He has an unbelievable talent, he wants to score goals and can score goals, with a magical left foot. On the other side, he works hard. Marcus was a selfish lad when I first came to the football club and now he's a match-winner and team player.

— Gateshead manager Gary Mills speaking in August 2014.

Maddison is also a freekick specialist. In 2014, he described his unusual freekick technique: "Everyone asks how I do it. You use the side of your foot, but you're hitting it more with your heel. If you hit with the middle of the side of your foot it just curls. If you hit it the way I do, it goes straight and moves at the same time." His style of play has also been compared to playmaker Mesut Özil.

== Legal issues ==
On 20 June 2023, Maddison pleaded guilty to one count of GBH without intent at Newton Aycliffe Magistrates' Court in relation to an incident on 24 September 2022 where he punched a 60-year-old woman in the face. He appeared at Teesside Crown Court on 18 July. On 8 August 2023, he was sentenced to 20 months imprisonment.

== Career statistics ==
As of match played 27 August 2022

Appearances and goals by club, season and competition
Club	Season	League			National cup		League cup		Other		Total	
Club	Season	Division	Apps	Goals	Apps	Goals	Apps	Goals	Apps	Goals	Apps	Goals
Newcastle United	2012–13	Premier League	0	0	0	0	0	0	0	0	0	0
Blyth Spartans (loan)	2012–13	Northern Premier League Premier Division	2	1	0	0	—		0	0	2	1
St Johnstone	2012–13	Scottish Premier League	0	0	—		—		—		0	0
Gateshead	2013–14	Conference Premier	29	9	0	0	—		4 (Note: One appearance one goal in FA Trophy; three appearances in Conference Premier play-offs)	1	33	10
Gateshead	2014–15	Conference Premier	5	4	0	0	—		0	0	5	4
Gateshead	Total		34	13	0	0	0	0	4	1	38	14
Peterborough United	2014–15	League One	29	7	0	0	0	0	1 (Note: Appearance(s) in Football League Trophy)	1	30	8
Peterborough United	2015–16	League One	39	11	4	1	2	1	1	0	46	13
Peterborough United	2016–17	League One	41	9	3	0	2	0	2 (Note: Appearance(s) in EFL Trophy)	0	48	9
Peterborough United	2017–18	League One	41	8	6	2	1	0	5	2	53	12
Peterborough United	2018–19	League One	40	8	2	1	0	0	4	1	46	10
Peterborough United	2019–20	League One	22	9	4	1	0	0	0	0	26	10
Peterborough United	Total		212	52	19	5	5	1	13	4	249	62
Hull City (loan)	2019–20	Championship	7	1	—		—		—		7	1
Charlton Athletic	2020–21	League One	8	1	1	0	0	0	1	1	10	2
Bolton Wanderers (loan)	2020–21	League Two	10	0	—		—		—		10	0
Spalding United	2021–22	Northern Premier League Division One Midlands	4	2	1	0	—		0	0	5	2
Darlington	2022–23	National League North	5	0	0	0	—		0	0	5	0
Career total			282	70	21	5	5	1	18	6	326	82

== Honours ==
Bolton Wanderers

- EFL League Two third-place (promotion): 2020–21

Individual

- Conference Premier Player of the Month: January 2014
- Football League Young Player of the Month: October 2014
