= Junior Morias =

Jamaican footballer (born 1995)

Personal information
- Full name: Junior Augustus Morias
- Date of birth: 4 July 1995 (age 31)
- Place of birth: Kingston, Jamaica
- Height: 5 ft 8 in (1.73 m)
- Position: Forward

Team information
- Current team: Hertford Town

Youth career
- 2008–2011: Fulham
- 2011–2012: Wycombe Wanderers

Senior career*
Years	Team	Apps	(Gls)
2012–2014	Wycombe Wanderers	27	(0)
2013	→ Hendon (loan)	7	(4)
2013	→ Hendon (loan)	7	(1)
2014	→ Boreham Wood (loan)	15	(8)
2014–2016	Boreham Wood	56	(12)
2016	→ Whitehawk (loan)	2	(0)
2016–2017	St Albans City	20	(9)
2017–2018	Peterborough United	45	(10)
2018–2019	Northampton Town	21	(6)
2019–2021	St Mirren	40	(2)
2021	→ Boreham Wood (loan)	13	(1)
2021	King's Lynn Town	7	(1)
2021–2023	Dagenham & Redbridge	57	(21)
2023–2025	Notts County	11	(1)
2024	→ Dagenham and Redbridge (loan)	19	(6)
2025	→ Woking (loan)	7	(2)
2025	Yeovil Town	18	(4)
2025–2026	Hornchurch	14	(1)
2026–	Hertford Town	1	(0)
- * Club domestic league appearances and goals as of 08:22, 18 October 2026 (UTC)

Junior Augustus Morias (born 4 July 1995) is a Jamaican footballer who plays as a forward for Southern League Division One Central club Hertford Town.

A former youth-team player at Fulham, he turned professional at Wycombe Wanderers in July 2012. From there he was loaned out to Hendon and Boreham Wood, before he joined Boreham Wood on a free-transfer in October 2014. He scored the club's winning goal in the 2015 Conference South play-off final. He joined Whitehawk on loan in January 2016, before being sold on to St Albans City in July 2016, where he impressed enough to win a move to Peterborough United in January 2017. In July 2018, Morias joined EFL League Two Northampton Town on a two-year contract, however after one year he moved to St Mirren.

== Club career ==
=== Wycombe Wanderers ===
Morias came through the Academy at Fulham, before he started a two-year scholarship with Wycombe Wanderers in 2011. He finished his first year as a scholar and signed his first professional contract in July 2012. He made his professional debut on 29 September 2012, in a 3–0 defeat away to Dagenham & Redbridge, coming on as a substitute for Jo Kuffour. He earned his first start on 3 November, in a 4–1 defeat at Crewe Alexandra in the FA Cup. He made 19 League Two appearances for the "Chairboys" during the 2012–13 season, all as a substitute.

He joined Isthmian League Premier Division side Hendon on loan in January 2013, making his debut in a 3–1 defeat at Croydon on 30 January. He scored four goals in seven games for the "Greens", and returned to Hendon on loan in August 2013, scoring one goal in another seven appearances. On 23 January 2014, he joined Boreham Wood on loan. By the end of the 2013–14 season he had scored eight goals in 15 Conference South appearances for the "Wood" and featured nine times for Wycombe, in addition to his seven appearances at Hendon.

However his contract at Adams Park was mutually terminated before the summer transfer window closed on 1 September 2014. His departure came less than three months after he signed a new one-year contract at the club, and manager Gareth Ainsworth refused to explain the reasoning behind the decision, saying only that "I'd rather not comment on how it came about, out of respect for Junior".

=== Boreham Wood ===
Following his release from Wycombe Wanderers, Morias joined Boreham Wood on a free-transfer on 6 October 2014. He scored 12 goals in 31 appearances across the 2014–15 season, including the winning goal in extra-time of the Conference South play-off final victory over Whitehawk at Meadow Park on 9 May 2015. On 29 January 2016, he joined Whitehawk on loan in search of game time and fitness, but featured in just two games for the "Hawks". He scored two goals in 29 National League matches for Boreham Wood in the 2015–16 campaign before he departed after rejecting new terms in June 2016.

=== St Albans City ===
On 4 July 2016, Morias joined National League South side St Albans City for an undisclosed fee. On the opening day of the 2016–17 campaign, Morias scored his first St Albans goal in a 2–0 victory over Concord Rangers at Clarence Park. On 6 November, he scored twice in the "Saints" 5–3 defeat to Carlisle United in the First Round of the FA Cup. His first goal against Carlisle went on win him both the FA's Goal of the Round and the club's Goal of the Season award. After selling Morias on to Peterborough, manager Ian Allinson stated that "When we signed Junior back in July, I said that the club would do everything possible to help him get back into the Football League, so I'm pleased we have delivered on our promise".

=== Peterborough United ===
On 1 January 2017, Morias joined League One side Peterborough United. He made his debut for "Posh" the following day in a 1–1 draw at Scunthorpe United, featuring for 80 minutes before being replaced by Tom Nichols. He scored his first goals in the English Football League on 4 February, his brace helping Peterborough to record a 3–0 win at Port Vale. He ended the 2016–17 campaign with four goals in 20 League One games. In September 2017, he was ruled out of action for five months after rupturing his thigh; manager Grant McCann said that "it's disappointing because he's started the season so well". After recovering from his injury he posted 31 appearances in the 2017–18 season, scoring seven goals. He was placed on the transfer-list at London Road by new manager Steve Evans in May 2018.

=== Northampton Town ===
On 13 July 2018, Morias signed for League Two side Northampton Town on a two-year contract for an undisclosed six figure fee.

=== St Mirren ===
On 22 August 2019, Morias signed for Scottish Premiership side St Mirren on a two-year contract for an undisclosed fee. On 6 January 2021, Morias rejoined National League side Boreham Wood on loan for the remainder of the 2020/21 season.

=== King's Lynn Town ===
On 25 June 2021, it was announced that he had signed with King's Lynn Town of the National League.

=== Dagenham & Redbridge ===
On 11 November 2021, Morias joined fellow National League side, Dagenham & Redbridge for an undisclosed fee.

Morias won the National League Player of the Month Award for April 2022 having scored six goals in six matches, including a twelve-minute hat-trick against Barnet.

=== Notts County ===
On 15 March 2023, Morias signed for National League second-placed side Notts County for an undisclosed fee.

In February 2025, Morias joined National League side Woking on loan for the remainder of the season. He scored two goals on his second appearance for the club against his former team Dag & Red.

=== Yeovil Town ===
On 5 August 2025, Morias signed for National League side Yeovil Town on a one-year contract.

=== Hornchurch ===
On 5 December 2025, Morias signed for National League South side Hornchurch.

== Style of play ==
Morias is a forward with an explosive shot.

== Career statistics ==
As of match played 3 March 2026

Appearances and goals by club, season and competition
Club	Season	League			National Cup (Note: Includes FA Cup, Scottish Cup)		League Cup (Note: Includes EFL Cup and Scottish League Cup)		Other		Total	
Club	Season	Division	Apps	Goals	Apps	Goals	Apps	Goals	Apps	Goals	Apps	Goals
Wycombe Wanderers	2012–13	League Two	19	0	1	0	0	0	2 (Note: Appearances in Football League Trophy)	0	22	0
Wycombe Wanderers	2013–14	League Two	8	0	1	0	0	0	0	0	9	0
Wycombe Wanderers	Total		27	0	2	0	0	0	2	0	31	0
Hendon (loan)	2012–13	IL Premier Division	7	4	—		—		—		7	4
Hendon (loan)	2013–14	IL Premier Division	7	1	—		—		—		7	1
Hendon (loan)	Total		14	5	—		—		—		14	5
Boreham Wood (loan)	2013–14	Conference South	15	8	—		—		0	0	15	8
Boreham Wood	2014–15	Conference South	27	10	3	1	—		3 (Note: Appearances in Conference South Play-offs)	2	33	13
Boreham Wood	2015–16	National League	29	2	3	1	—		0	0	32	3
Boreham Wood	Total		56	12	6	2	0	0	3	2	65	16
Whitehawk (loan)	2015–16	National League South	2	0	—		—		0	0	2	0
St Albans City	2016–17	National League South	20	9	1	2	—		2 (Note: Appearances in FA Trophy)	0	23	11
Peterborough United	2016–17	League One	20	4	0	0	0	0	0	0	20	4
Peterborough United	2017–18	League One	25	6	2	0	1	0	3 (Note: Appearance in the EFL Trophy)	0	31	7
Peterborough United	Total		45	10	2	0	1	0	3	0	51	11
Northampton Town	2018–19	League Two	19	6	1	0	1	0	2	0	23	6
Northampton Town	2019–20	League Two	2	0	0	0	0	0	—		2	0
Northampton Town	Total		21	6	1	0	1	0	2	0	25	6
St Mirren	2019–20	Scottish Premiership	26	2	3	0	0	0	0	0	29	2
St Mirren	2020–21	Scottish Premiership	14	0	0	0	4	0	—		18	0
St Mirren	Total		40	2	3	0	4	0	0	0	47	2
Boreham Wood (loan)	2020–21	National League	13	1	1	0	—		1	0	15	1
King's Lynn Town	2021–22	National League	7	1	1	0	—		—		8	1
Dagenham & Redbridge	2021–22	National League	24	11	—		—		4	2	28	13
Dagenham & Redbridge	2022–23	National League	33	10	4	1	—		2	2	39	13
Dagenham & Redbridge	Total		57	21	4	1	—		6	4	67	26
Notts County	2022–23	National League	2	0	—		—		0	0	2	0
Notts County	2023–24	League Two	9	1	1	0	1	0	3	1	14	2
Notts County	2024–25	League Two	0	0	0	0	0	0	1 (Note: Appearance in the EFL League Two play-offs)	0	1	0
Notts County	Total		11	1	1	0	1	0	4	1	17	2
Dagenham & Redbridge (loan)	2024–25	National League	19	6	4	1	—		3 (Note: One appearance in FA Trophy, two in National League Cup)	0	26	7
Woking (loan)	2024–25	National League	7	2	—		—		—		7	2
Yeovil Town	2025–26	National League	18	4	1	0	—		0	0	19	4
Hornchurch	2025–26	National League South	14	1	—		—		2 (Note: One appearance in FA Trophy, one appearance in Essex Senior Cup)	0	16	1
Career total			385	89	27	6	7	0	28	7	447	102

== Honours ==
Boreham Wood

- Conference South play-off winner: 2015

Individual

- National League Player of the Month: April 2022
