= 2018–19 Peterborough United F.C. season =

Peterborough United
2018–19 season
- Chairman: Darragh MacAnthony
- Manager: Steve Evans (until 26 January); Darren Ferguson (from 26 January)
- Stadium: ABAX Stadium
- League One: 7th
- FA Cup: Third round
- EFL Cup: First round
- EFL Trophy: Quarter-final
- Top goalscorer: League: Ivan Toney (16); All: Ivan Toney (23)
- Highest home attendance: 11,277 (22 April 2019 vs. Sunderland)
- Lowest home attendance: 1,872 (9 October 2018 vs. Brighton & Hove Albion U21, EFL Trophy)
- Average home league attendance: 7,364
- Biggest win: 5–1 (25 August 2018 at Plymouth Argyle)
- Biggest defeat: 0–5 (5 January 2019 at Middlesbrough, FA Cup R3)
Home colours	Away colours	Third colours

The 2018–19 season was Peterborough United's 59th year in the Football League and their sixth consecutive season in the third tier, League One. Along with League One, the club also participated in the FA Cup, EFL Cup and EFL Trophy. The season covered the period from 1 July 2018 to 30 June 2019.

== Squad ==
No.	Name	Pos.	Nat.	Place of Birth	Age	Apps	Goals	Signed from	Date signed	Fee	Ends
Goalkeepers
1	Aaron Chapman	GK	(England)	London	36	29	0	Accrington Stanley	1 July 2018	Free	2020
25	Conor O'Malley	GK	(Republic of Ireland)	Westport	23	25	0	St Patrick's Athletic	7 August 2017	Undisclosed	Undisclosed
40	Mark Tyler	GK	(England)	Norwich	41	419	0	Luton Town	6 June 2016	Undisclosed	2019
Defenders
2	Jason Naismith	RB	(Scotland)	Paisley	32	33	0	Ross County	1 July 2018	Undisclosed	2021
3	Josh Knight	CB	(England)	Fleckney	29	0	0	Leicester City	31 January 2019	Loan	2019
5	Ryan Tafazolli	CB	(Iran) (England)	Sutton	26	122	8	Mansfield Town	6 June 2016	Free	2019
6	Ben White	CB	(England)	Poole	28	5	0	Brighton & Hove Albion	4 January 2019	Loan	2019
16	Rhys Bennett	CB	(England)	Ashton-in-Makerfield	35	35	3	Mansfield Town	1 July 2018	Free	2020
18	Daniel Lafferty	LB	(Northern Ireland)	Derry	37	5	0	Sheffield United	3 January 2019	Loan	2019
20	Josh Yorwerth	CB	(Wales)	Bridgend	31	3	0	Crawley Town	6 July 2018	Undisclosed	2021
23	Tyler Denton	LB	(England)	Dewsbury	31	11	0	Leeds United	5 July 2018	Loan	2019
24	Lewis Freestone	LB	(England)	King's Lynn	18	8	0	Academy	30 July 2016	Trainee	2019
34	Sam Cartwright	CB	(England)	St Neots	17	0	0	Academy	1 July 2017	Free	2019
Midfielders
4	Alex Woodyard	CM	(England)	Gravesend	33	36	0	Lincoln City	1 July 2018	Undisclosed	2020
11	Louis Reed	CM	(England)	Barnsley	29	24	0	Sheffield United	1 July 2018	Undisclosed	2021
14	Callum Cooke	AM	(England)	Peterlee	29	13	1	Middlesbrough	30 July 2018	Free	2020
15	Joe Ward	LW	(England)	Chelmsford	22	56	3	Woking	10 January 2018	Undisclosed	2020
19	George Cooper	AM	(England)	Warrington	21	32	5	Crewe Alexandra	18 January 2018	Undisclosed	2021
21	Marcus Maddison	LW/AM	(England)	Durham	24	209	45	Gateshead	27 August 2014	£250,000	2020
22	Darren Lyon	CM	(Scotland)		31	4	0	Hamilton Academical	24 August 2018	Free	2019
30	Kyle Dempsey	CM	(England)	Whitehaven	30	4	0	Fleetwood Town	7 January 2019	Loan	2019
31	Harrison Burrows	AM	(England)	Murrow	24	0	0	Academy	13 January 2019	Trainee	2021
38	Andrea Borg	AM	(Malta)	Dubai	18	4	0	Academy	13 April 2017	Trainee	2019
—	Kyle Barker	CM	(England)		26	0	0	Academy	25 March 2019	Trainee	2021
Forwards
7	Isaac Buckley-Ricketts	WG	(England)	Manchester	27	2	0	Manchester City	17 July 2018	Undisclosed	2021
9	Matt Godden	CF	(England)	Canterbury	35	35	14	Stevenage	1 July 2018	£400,000	2021
10	Siriki Dembélé	LW	(Scotland)		30	36	6	Grimsby Town	1 July 2018	Undisclosed	2021
17	Ivan Toney	CF	(England)	Northampton	30	39	17	Newcastle United	9 August 2018	Undisclosed	Undisclosed
26	Matty Stevens	CF	(England)	Surrey	20	4	0	Barnet	1 July 2016	Free	2019
29	Lee Tomlin	SS	(England)	Leicester	37	160	44	Cardiff City	8 January 2019	Loan	2019
33	Morgan Penfold	SS	(England)	Peterborough	19	0	0	Academy	28 January 2017	Trainee	2019
Out on loan
8	Mark O'Hara	CM	(Scotland)	Barrhead	30	28	4	Dundee	1 July 2018	Undisclosed	2021
28	Jermaine Anderson	CM	(England)	Camden Town	22	96	7	Academy	1 July 2012	Trainee	Undisclosed
	Idris Kanu	CF	(England)	London	22	27	0	Aldershot Town	1 August 2017	Undisclosed	2020

=== Statistics ===
As of 21 June 2019

No.	Pos	Nat	Player	Total		League One		FA Cup		League Cup		League Trophy	
No.	Pos	Nat	Player	Apps	Goals	Apps	Goals	Apps	Goals	Apps	Goals	Apps	Goals
1	GK	(England) ENG	Aaron Chapman	37	0	32+0	0	2+0	0	1+0	0	2+0	0
2	DF	(Scotland) SCO	Jason Naismith	50	1	42+1	1	2+1	0	1+0	0	3+0	0
3	DF	(England) ENG	Josh Knight	8	0	6+2	0	0+0	0	0+0	0	0+0	0
4	MF	(England) ENG	Alex Woodyard	51	0	41+2	0	4+0	0	1+0	0	2+1	0
5	DF	(Iran) IRN	Ryan Tafazolli	47	1	35+2	1	4+0	0	1+0	0	5+0	0
6	DF	(England) ENG	Ben White	16	1	14+1	1	1+0	0	0+0	0	0+0	0
7	FW	(England) ENG	Isaac Buckley-Ricketts	2	0	0+0	0	0+0	0	0+0	0	1+1	0
9	FW	(England) ENG	Matt Godden	48	18	29+9	14	2+2	2	0+1	0	1+4	2
10	FW	(Scotland) SCO	Siriki Dembélé	47	7	30+8	5	3+1	1	1+0	0	3+1	1
11	MF	(England) ENG	Louis Reed	36	1	19+9	1	2+1	0	0+0	0	5+0	0
14	MF	(England) ENG	Callum Cooke	20	1	10+3	1	0+1	0	1+0	0	5+0	0
15	MF	(England) ENG	Joe Ward	52	5	34+9	4	4+0	1	1+0	0	3+1	0
16	DF	(England) ENG	Rhys Bennett	45	4	36+1	4	3+0	0	1+0	0	4+0	0
17	FW	(England) ENG	Ivan Toney	55	23	31+13	16	3+1	4	1+0	0	5+1	3
18	DF	(Northern Ireland) NIR	Daniel Lafferty	20	0	17+0	0	1+0	0	0+0	0	2+0	0
19	MF	(England) ENG	George Cooper	29	3	4+17	2	1+1	0	1+0	0	3+2	1
21	MF	(England) ENG	Marcus Maddison	45	10	30+9	8	2+0	1	0+0	0	4+0	1
22	MF	(Scotland) SCO	Darren Lyon	4	0	0+2	0	0+0	0	0+0	0	2+0	0
23	DF	(England) ENG	Tyler Denton	14	0	9+1	0	1+0	0	1+0	0	1+1	0
25	GK	(Republic of Ireland) IRL	Conor O'Malley	20	0	14+0	0	2+0	0	0+0	0	4+0	0
26	FW	(England) ENG	Matty Stevens	3	0	0+3	0	0+0	0	0+0	0	0+0	0
27	DF	(Cameroon) CMR	Sebastien Bassong	1	0	0+0	0	0+0	0	0+0	0	1+0	0
29	FW	(England) ENG	Lee Tomlin	21	2	14+5	2	0+0	0	0+0	0	2+0	0
30	MF	(England) ENG	Kyle Dempsey	11	0	6+5	0	0+0	0	0+0	0	0+0	0
Players out on loan:
8	MF	(Scotland) SCO	Mark O'Hara	29	4	14+8	4	3+1	0	1+0	0	0+2	0
Players who left the club:
3	DF	(England) ENG	Colin Daniel	25	1	20+0	0	2+0	0	0+0	0	3+0	1
6	MF	(Scotland) SCO	Jamie Walker	17	2	6+6	1	0+1	0	0+0	0	2+2	1
20	DF	(Wales) WAL	Josh Yorwerth	3	0	0+2	0	0+0	0	0+0	0	1+0	0
35	FW	(Australia) AUS	Jason Cummings	29	8	11+11	6	2+2	0	0+1	0	2+0	2

=== Goals record ===
As of 9 February 2019

Rank	No.	Nat.	Po.	Name	League One	FA Cup	League Cup	League Trophy	Total
1	17	(England)	CF	Ivan Toney	16	4	0	3	23
2	9	(England)	CF	Matt Godden	14	2	0	2	18
3	21	(England)	LM	Marcus Maddison	8	1	0	1	10
4	~~35~~	(Australia)	CF	Jason Cummings	6	0	0	2	8
5	10	(Scotland)	RW	Siriki Dembélé	5	1	0	1	7
6	15	(England)	LW	Joe Ward	4	1	0	0	5
7	8	(Scotland)	CM	Mark O'Hara	4	0	0	0	4
7	16	(England)	CB	Rhys Bennett	4	0	0	0	4
9	19	(England)	AM	George Cooper	2	0	0	1	3
10	~~6~~	(Scotland)	AM	Jamie Walker	1	0	0	1	2
10	29	(England)	SS	Lee Tomlin	2	0	0	0	2
12	2	(England)	RB	Jason Naismith	1	0	0	0	1
12	~~3~~	(England)	LB	Colin Daniel	0	0	0	1	1
12	5	(Iran)	CB	Ryan Tafazolli	1	0	0	0	1
12	6	(England)	CB	Ben White	1	0	0	0	1
12	11	(England)	CM	Louis Reed	1	0	0	0	1
12	14	(England)	AM	Callum Cooke	1	0	0	0	1
Total					69	9	0	12	90

=== Disciplinary record ===
As of 9 February 2019

Rank	No.	Nat.	Po.	Name	League One			FA Cup			League Cup			League Trophy			Total		
Rank	No.	Nat.	Po.	Name	Booked	(yellow card) (yellow-red card)	Sent off (straight red)	Booked	(yellow card) (yellow-red card)	Sent off (straight red)	Booked	(yellow card) (yellow-red card)	Sent off (straight red)	Booked	(yellow card) (yellow-red card)	Sent off (straight red)	Booked	(yellow card) (yellow-red card)	Sent off (straight red)
1	21	(England)	LM	Marcus Maddison	11	0	0	2	0	0	0	0	0	1	0	0	14	0	0
2	17	(England)	CF	Ivan Toney	9	0	1	1	0	0	0	0	0	1	0	0	11	0	1
3	4	(England)	CM	Alex Woodyard	8	0	0	0	0	0	0	0	0	2	0	0	10	0	0
4	~~3~~	(England)	LB	Colin Daniel	5	0	0	0	0	0	0	0	0	1	0	0	6	0	0
4	11	(Northern Ireland)	LM	Louis Reed	4	0	0	0	0	0	0	0	0	2	0	0	6	0	0
6	5	(Iran)	CB	Ryan Tafazolli	4	0	1	0	0	0	0	0	0	0	0	0	4	0	1
6	29	(England)	SS	Lee Tomlin	3	1	0	0	0	0	0	0	0	0	0	0	3	1	0
8	2	(Scotland)	RB	Jason Naismith	4	0	0	0	0	0	0	0	0	0	0	0	4	0	0
8	~~6~~	(Scotland)	AM	Jamie Walker	4	0	0	0	0	0	0	0	0	0	0	0	4	0	0
8	8	(Scotland)	CM	Mark O'Hara	4	0	0	0	0	0	0	0	0	0	0	0	4	0	0
8	15	(England)	LW	Joe Ward	3	0	0	1	0	0	0	0	0	0	0	0	4	0	0
8	16	(England)	CB	Rhys Bennett	3	0	1	0	0	0	0	0	0	0	0	0	3	0	1
13	19	(England)	AM	George Cooper	2	0	0	1	0	0	0	0	0	0	0	0	3	0	0
13	~~35~~	(Australia)	CF	Jason Cummings	3	0	0	0	0	0	0	0	0	0	0	0	3	0	0
15	6	(England)	CB	Ben White	1	0	0	1	0	0	0	0	0	0	0	0	2	0	0
15	10	(Scotland)	RW	Siriki Dembélé	2	0	0	0	0	0	0	0	0	0	0	0	2	0	0
15	18	(Northern Ireland)	LB	Daniel Lafferty	2	0	0	0	0	0	0	0	0	0	0	0	2	0	0
15	23	(England)	LB	Tyler Denton	0	1	0	0	0	0	0	0	0	0	0	0	0	1	0
15	25	(Republic of Ireland)	GK	Conor O'Malley	2	0	0	0	0	0	0	0	0	0	0	0	2	0	0
20	1	(England)	GK	Aaron Chapman	1	0	0	0	0	0	0	0	0	0	0	0	1	0	0
20	3	(England)	CB	Josh Knight	1	0	0	0	0	0	0	0	0	0	0	0	1	0	0
20	9	(England)	CF	Matt Godden	0	0	0	1	0	0	0	0	0	0	0	0	1	0	0
20	14	(England)	AM	Callum Cooke	1	0	0	0	0	0	0	0	0	0	0	0	1	0	0
Total					77	2	3	7	0	0	0	0	0	7	0	0	91	2	3

== Transfers ==
=== Transfers in ===
Date from	Position	Nationality	Name	From	Fee	Ref.
1 July 2018	CB	(England)	Rhys Bennett	Mansfield Town	Free transfer	
1 July 2018	GK	(England)	Aaron Chapman	Accrington Stanley	Free transfer	
1 July 2018	LM	(England)	Colin Daniel	Blackpool	Free transfer	
1 July 2018	LW	(Scotland)	Siriki Dembélé	Grimsby Town	Undisclosed	
1 July 2018	CF	(England)	Matt Godden	Stevenage	Undisclosed	
1 July 2018	RB	(Scotland)	Jason Naismith	(Scotland) Ross County	Undisclosed	
1 July 2018	CM	(Scotland)	Mark O'Hara	(Scotland) Dundee	Undisclosed	
1 July 2018	CM	(England)	Louis Reed	Sheffield United	Undisclosed	
1 July 2018	CM	(England)	Alex Woodyard	Lincoln City	Undisclosed	
6 July 2018	CB	(Wales)	Josh Yorwerth	Crawley Town	Undisclosed	
17 July 2018	RW	(England)	Isaac Buckley-Ricketts	Manchester City	Undisclosed	
30 July 2018	AM	(England)	Callum Cooke	Middlesbrough	Free transfer	
9 August 2018	CF	(England)	Ivan Toney	Newcastle United	£650,000	
24 August 2018	CM	(Scotland)	Darren Lyon	(Scotland) Hamilton Academical	Free transfer	
25 October 2018	CB	(Cameroon)	Sébastien Bassong	Free agent	—N/a	

=== Transfers out ===
Date from	Position	Nationality	Name	To	Fee	Ref.
1 July 2018	DM	(England)	Callum Chettle	Alfreton Town	Released	
1 July 2018	CM	(Portugal)	Leonardo Da Silva Lopes	Wigan Athletic	Undisclosed	
1 July 2018	DM	(Wales)	Michael Doughty	Swindon Town	Released	
1 July 2018	LM	(Republic of Ireland)	Christopher Forrester	(Scotland) Aberdeen	Undisclosed	
1 July 2018	LB	(Wales)	Andrew Hughes	Preston North End	Undisclosed	
1 July 2018	CF	(England)	Ricky Miller	Port Vale	Undisclosed	
1 July 2018	SS	(England)	Adil Nabi	(Scotland) Dundee	Mutual consent	
1 July 2018	CB	(England)	Alex Penny	(Scotland) Hamilton Academical	Undisclosed	
1 July 2018	RB	(Wales)	Liam Shephard	Forest Green Rovers	Undisclosed	
3 July 2018	CM	(Australia)	Brad Inman	Rochdale	Mutual consent	
10 July 2018	CB	(England)	Steven Taylor	(New Zealand) Wellington Phoenix	Undisclosed	
13 July 2018	CF	(England)	Junior Morias	Northampton Town	Undisclosed	
16 July 2018	AM	(England)	Danny Lloyd	Salford City	Undisclosed	
17 July 2018	LW	(Wales)	Gwion Edwards	Ipswich Town	£700,000	
26 July 2018	CF	(England)	Jack Marriott	Derby County	£2,500,000	
28 July 2018	CB	(England)	Jack Baldwin	Sunderland	£200,000	
2 August 2018	GK	(England)	Lewis Elsom	Kettering Town	Free transfer	
2 August 2018	CM	(England)	Anthony Grant	Shrewsbury Town	Undisclosed	
17 October 2018	GK	(England)	Josh Tibbetts	Southport	Mutual consent	
17 January 2019	CM	(England)	Jermaine Anderson	Bradford City	Undisclosed	
21 January 2019	LB	(England)	Colin Daniel	Burton Albion	Undisclosed	

=== Loans in ===
Start date	Position	Nationality	Name	From	End date	Ref.
2 July 2018	CM	(Scotland)	Adam King	(Wales) Swansea City	9 August 2018	
6 July 2018	LB	(England)	Tyler Denton	Leeds United	31 May 2019	
13 July 2018	CF	(Australia)	Jason Cummings	Nottingham Forest	31 January 2019	
31 August 2018	LW	(Scotland)	Jamie Walker	Wigan Athletic	2 January 2019	
3 January 2019	LB	(Northern Ireland)	Daniel Lafferty	Sheffield United	31 May 2019	
4 January 2019	CB	(England)	Ben White	Brighton & Hove Albion	31 May 2019	
7 January 2019	CM	(England)	Kyle Dempsey	Fleetwood Town	31 May 2019	
8 January 2019	SS	(England)	Lee Tomlin	(Wales) Cardiff City	31 May 2019	
31 January 2019	CB	(England)	Josh Knight	Leicester City	31 May 2019	

=== Loans out ===
Start date	Position	Nationality	Name	To	End date	Ref.
1 July 2018	CF	(England)	Idris Kanu	Port Vale	4 January 2019	
27 July 2018	FW	(England)	Morgan Penfold	Grantham Town	January 2019	
6 August 2018	LB	(England)	Lewis Freestone	Nuneaton Town	January 2019	
9 August 2018	GK	(England)	Josh Tibbetts	Solihull Moors	September 2018	
10 August 2018	MF	(Malta)	Andrea Borg	Kettering Town	January 2019	
24 August 2018	CM	(England)	Jermaine Anderson	Doncaster Rovers	January 2019	
31 August 2018	CF	(England)	Mathew Stevens	Slough Town	February 2019	
4 January 2019	LW	(England)	Idris Kanu	Boreham Wood	31 May 2019	
17 January 2019	CM	(England)	Jermaine Anderson	Bradford City	31 May 2019	
24 January 2019	CM	(Scotland)	Mark O'Hara	Lincoln City	31 May 2019	
16 February 2019	FW	(England)	Morgan Penfold	Hitchin Town	March 2019	

== Competitions ==
=== Pre-season friendlies ===
The Posh announced friendlies against Stamford, Bedford Town, Peterborough Sports, St Neots Town, Marítimo, Louletano and Bolton Wanderers.

4 July 2018 Friendly	Stamford	1–5	Peterborough United	Stamford
19:30 BST	Adams 74' (pen.)	Report	Dembélé 5'; Stevens 59', 84'; Cooper 83'; Ward 87'	Stadium: Zeeco Stadium; Attendance: 937

7 July 2018 Friendly	Bedford Town	2–4	Peterborough United	Cardington
15:00 BST	Harriett; Gyasi	Report	Denton; Dembélé; Rodgers; Lloyd	Stadium: The Eyrie

10 July 2018 Friendly	Peterborough Sports	0–9	Peterborough United	Peterborough
19:30 BST		Report	Ward; Denton; Lloyd; Dembélé (x2); O'Hara; Penfold; Edwards; Cooper	Stadium: Lincoln Road

14 July 2018 Friendly	St Neots Town	0–4	Peterborough United	St Neots
15:00 BST		Report	Parr (o.g.); Stevens (x2); Penfold	Stadium: Kester Way; Attendance: 471

18 July 2018 Friendly	Marítimo	1–0	Peterborough United	Algarve, Portugal
10:00 BST	Valente 51'	Report		Stadium: Bela Vista Stadium

21 July 2018 Friendly	Louletano	2–5	Peterborough United	Ferreiras, Portugal
11:00 BST	18'; 54'	Report	Marriott 16', 42' (pen.); Godden 24'; Reed 85'; Cooper 89'	Stadium: Estádio da Nora

24 July 2018 Friendly	Gainsborough Trinity	0–1	Peterborough United	Gainsborough
19:30 BST		Report	Cooper 86'	Stadium: Gainsborough Martin & Co. Arena

28 July 2018 Friendly	Peterborough United	0–2	Bolton Wanderers	Peterborough
15:00 BST		Report	Le Fondre 14'; Ameobi 25'	Stadium: ABAX Stadium; Referee: Neil Hair

=== League One ===
==== League table ====
Pos	Team	Pld	W	D	L	GF	GA	GD	Pts	Promotion, qualification or relegation
5	Sunderland	46	22	19	5	80	47	+33	85	Qualification for League One play-offs (Note: Four teams play for one spot and promotion to the EFL Championship.)
6	Doncaster Rovers	46	20	13	13	76	58	+18	73	Qualification for League One play-offs
7	Peterborough United	46	20	12	14	71	62	+9	72	
8	Coventry City	46	18	11	17	54	54	0	65	
9	Burton Albion	46	17	12	17	66	57	+9	63	

Source: EFL Official Website
Rules for classification: 1) Points; 2) Goal difference; 3) Number of goals scored; 4) Head-to-head results

==== Results summary ====
Overall								Home						Away					
Pld	W	D	L	GF	GA	GD	Pts	W	D	L	GF	GA	GD	W	D	L	GF	GA	GD
46	20	12	14	71	62	+9	72	9	7	7	31	28	+3	11	5	7	40	34	+6

Last updated: 4 May 2019.
Source: BBC

==== Results by matchday ====
Matchday	1	2	3	4	5	6	7	8	9	10	11	12	13	14	15	16	17	18	19	20	21	22	23	24	25	26	27	28	29	30	31	32	33	34	35	36	37	38	39	40	41	42	43	44	45	46
Ground	H	A	H	A	A	H	A	H	A	H	A	H	A	H	H	A	A	H	A	H	H	A	H	A	A	H	H	A	H	A	H	A	A	H	H	A	A	H	H	H	A	A	H	A	A	H
Result	W	W	W	W	W	D	W	L	W	D	D	L	W	L	W	W	L	D	D	W	D	D	D	L	W	L	W	L	D	D	L	L	W	L	W	L	L	L	W	W	W	D	D	L	W	W
Position	4	3	1	1	1	1	1	2	1	2	2	2	2	2	2	2	3	4	3	4	4	4	5	6	5	7	6	6	6	6	6	7	7	7	7	7	7	8	6	7	7	7	7	7	7	7

Updated to match(es) played on 4 May 2019. Source: Statto.com
A = Away; H = Home; W = Win; D = Draw; L = Loss

==== Matches ====
On 21 June 2018, the League One fixtures for the forthcoming season were announced.

4 August 2018 1	Peterborough United	2–1	Bristol Rovers	Peterborough
15:00 BST	Godden 1'; O'Hara 26'	Report	Lockyer 90+3'	Stadium: London Road Stadium; Attendance: 6,439; Referee: John Busby

11 August 2018 2	Rochdale	1–4	Peterborough United	Rochdale
15:00 BST	Henderson 17' (pen.); McGahey (yellow card) 45+3'	Report	Cummings 25'; O'Hara 34', 90+3'; Woodyard (yellow card) 41'; Godden 45+3'	Stadium: Spotland Stadium; Attendance: 3,128; Referee: Oliver Rathbone

18 August 2018 3	Peterborough United	3–1	Luton Town	Peterborough
15:00 BST	Cummings 17' (pen.), 36'; Dembélé 19'	Report	Stacey 78'	Stadium: London Road Stadium; Attendance: 8,016; Referee: Graham Salisbury

21 August 2018 4	Charlton Athletic	0–1	Peterborough United	Charlton
19:45 BST		Report	Cummings 89' (pen.)	Stadium: The Valley; Attendance: 9,762; Referee: James Linington

25 August 2018 5	Plymouth Argyle	1–5	Peterborough United	Plymouth
15:00 BST	Edwards 90+1'	Report	Godden 8', 90+4'; Dembélé 11'; Cummings 48', 54' (pen.)	Stadium: Home Park; Attendance: 9,214; Referee: Chris Sarginson

1 September 2018 6	Peterborough United	1–1	Doncaster Rovers	Peterborough
15:00 BST	Raynor (yellow card) 31' (yellow-red card) 82'; Tafazolli 58'; Daniel (yellow card) 66'; Evans (yellow card) 78' (yellow-red card) 82'	Report	Kane (yellow card) 31'; Marquis 40'; Wilks (yellow card) 50'; Whiteman (yellow card) 81'	Stadium: London Road Stadium; Attendance: 7,060; Referee: Darren Bond

8 September 2018 7	Southend United	2–3	Peterborough United	Southend-on-Sea
15:00 BST	Hopper 63'; McLaughlin 75'	Report	Godden 32', 57'; Toney 87'	Stadium: Roots Hall; Attendance: 6,551; Referee: Kevin Johnson

15 September 2018 8	Peterborough United	1–2	Portsmouth	Peterborough
15:00 BST	Godden 90+4'	Report	Hawkins 62'; Lowe 75'	Stadium: London Road Stadium; Attendance: 10,472; Referee: Roger East

22 September 2018 9	Gillingham	2–4	Peterborough United	Gillingham
15:00 BST	Reilly 50'; Byrne 53'	Report	Walker 24'; Dembélé 59'; Toney 64'; Cooke 87'	Stadium: Priestfield Stadium; Referee: Lee Swabey

29 September 2018 10	Peterborough United	2–2	Blackpool	Peterborough
15:00 BST	Bennett 27'; O'Hara 64'	Report	Gnanduillet 58'; Delfouneso 66'	Stadium: London Road Stadium; Attendance: 6,269; Referee: Carl Boyeson

2 October 2018 11	Sunderland	2–2	Peterborough United	Sunderland
19:45 BST	Maja 21'; Power (yellow card) 22'; Oviedo (red card) 68'; Sinclair 79'	Report	Ward 74'; Toney 84', (yellow card) 86'	Stadium: Stadium of Light; Attendance: 28,727; Referee: David Coote

6 October 2018 12	Peterborough United	0–4	Barnsley	Peterborough
15:00 BST	Toney (yellow card) 43'; Bennett (yellow card) 54'; Reed (yellow card) 86'	Report	Moncur 14'; Potts 45+1', 59'; Cavaré (yellow card) 62'; Lindsay (yellow card) 88'; Brown 90+2'	Stadium: London Road Stadium; Attendance: 7,683; Referee: Darren Drysdale

13 October 2018 13	Scunthorpe United	0–2	Peterborough United	Scunthorpe
15:00 BST		Report	Godden 51', 58'; Daniel (yellow card) 82'; Toney (yellow card) 84'; O'Hara (yellow card) 90'	Stadium: Glanford Park; Attendance: 4,566; Referee: Robert Lewis

20 October 2018 14	Peterborough United	0–1	Accrington Stanley	Peterborough
15:00 BST	Cummings (yellow card) 59'; O'Hara (yellow card) 77'; Woodyard (yellow card) 88'	Report	Conville 11', (yellow card) 68'; Barlaser (yellow card) 32'; Anderton (yellow card) 87'	Stadium: London Road Stadium; Attendance: 6,141; Referee: Scott Duncan

23 October 2018 15	Peterborough United	1–0	Fleetwood Town	Peterborough
19:45 BST	Bennett 52'	Report		Stadium: London Road Stadium; Attendance: 5,347; Referee: Ollie Yates

27 October 2018 16	Burton Albion	1–2	Peterborough United	Burton upon Trent
15:00 BST	Allen 60'; McFadzean (yellow card) 55'	Report	Ward 29'; Dembélé 58'; Bennett (yellow card) 74'; Chapman (yellow card) 78'	Stadium: Pirelli Stadium; Attendance: 3,600; Referee: Graham Salisbury

3 November 2018 17	Wycombe Wanderers	1–0	Peterborough United	High Wycombe
15:00 GMT	Gape (yellow card) 31'; Morris 67'; El-Abd (yellow card) 80'	Report	Tafazolli (yellow card) 66'; Toney (yellow card) 90+1'	Stadium: Adams Park; Attendance: 5,225; Referee: Ben Toner

17 November 2018 18	Peterborough United	1–1	Bradford City	Peterborough
15:00 GMT	Reed (yellow card) 54'; Toney 61'	Report	O'Connor 10'; Ball (yellow card) 55'; Akpan (yellow card) 21'; J. O'Brien (yellow card) 76'; Caddis (yellow card) 26'	Stadium: London Road Stadium; Attendance: 8,046; Referee: Scott Oldham

23 November 2018 19	Coventry City	1–1	Peterborough United	Coventry
19:45 GMT	Chaplin 90+1'	Report	Toney 90'	Stadium: Ricoh Arena; Attendance: 11,719; Referee: Anthony Backhouse

27 November 2018 20	Peterborough United	1–0	AFC Wimbledon	Peterborough
19:45 GMT	Maddison 60'	Report		Stadium: London Road Stadium; Attendance: 5,064; Referee: Christopher Sarginson

8 December 2018 21	Peterborough United	2–2	Oxford United	Peterborough
15:00 GMT	Toney 10'; Tafazolli (yellow card) 44'; Woodyard (yellow card) 45+3'; Ward (yellow card) 70'; Dembélé 75'	Report	Mackie (yellow card) 33'; Browne (yellow card) 36'; Henry 42', 88' (pen.)	Stadium: London Road Stadium; Attendance: 7,027; Referee: Charles Breakspear

15 December 2018 22	Shrewsbury Town	2–2	Peterborough United	Shrewsbury
15:00 GMT	Docherty 2'; Okenabirhie 59'; Grant (yellow card) 79'	Report	Godden 12'; Cummings (yellow card) 81'; Tafazolli 90+2'	Stadium: New Meadow; Attendance: 5,393; Referee: Michael Salisbury

22 December 2018 23	Peterborough United	1–1	Walsall	Peterborough
15:00 GMT	Toney 47'; Maddison (yellow card) 73'; O'Malley (yellow card) 89'	Report	Cook (yellow card) 36'; Osbourne 45+1'; Leahy (penalty missed) 89'	Stadium: London Road Stadium; Attendance: 7,243; Referee: Paul Mardsen

26 December 2018 24	Barnsley	2–0	Peterborough United	Barnsley
15:00 GMT	Mowatt 24'; Woodrow 49'; Dougall (yellow card) 85'	Report	Toney (yellow card) 68'	Stadium: Oakwell; Attendance: 12,843; Referee: Carl Boyeson

29 December 2018 25	Accrington Stanley	0–4	Peterborough United	Accrington
15:00 GMT		Report	Toney 19', 41', 85'; Bennett 67'	Stadium: Crown Ground; Attendance: 2,672; Referee: Thomas Bramall

1 January 2019 26	Peterborough United	0–2	Scunthorpe United	Peterborough
15:00 GMT			Novak 5', 57'	Stadium: London Road Stadium; Attendance: 6,947; Referee: Ollie Yates

12 January 2019 27	Peterborough United	2–1	Rochdale	Peterborough
15:00 GMT	Tomlin 23'; Cooper 84'	Report	Done (yellow card) 37'; Hamilton (yellow card) 52' (goal) 90'	Stadium: London Road Stadium; Attendance: 6,025; Referee: Darren Drysdale

19 January 2019 28	Luton Town	4–0	Peterborough United	Luton
15:00 GMT	Collins 8', 27', 53'; Pearson (yellow card) 12'; Berry 66'	Report	Tafazolli (red card) 25'; Maddison (yellow card) 63'; Toney (yellow card) 73'	Stadium: Kenilworth Road; Attendance: 10,055; Referee: David Coote

26 January 2019 29	Peterborough United	0–0	Charlton Athletic	Peterborough
15:00 GMT	Naismith (yellow card) 86'	Report	Williams (yellow card) 32'; Bielik (yellow card) 68'; Reeves (yellow card) 77'; Grant (penalty missed) 79'	Stadium: London Road Stadium; Attendance: 9,002; Referee: David Webb

29 January 2019 30	Bristol Rovers	2–2	Peterborough United	Horfield
19:45 GMT	Nichols 8' (pen.); Clarke 43'	Report	Toney 37'; Tomlin (yellow card) 56'; Ward 90'	Stadium: Memorial Stadium; Attendance: 6,851; Referee: Lee Collins

2 February 2019 31	Peterborough United	0–1	Plymouth Argyle	Peterborough
15:00 GMT	Tomlin (yellow card) 45' (yellow-red card) 45+4'	Report	Smith-Brown (yellow card) 64'; Canavan (yellow card) 74'; Lameiras 88'	Stadium: London Road Stadium; Attendance: 6,543; Referee: Peter Wright

9 February 2019 32	Doncaster Rovers	3–1	Peterborough United	Doncaster
15:00 GMT	Wilks (yellow card) 45+5'; Downing (yellow card) 60'; Blair 62'; Marquis 65'; Sadlier 74'	Report	Cooper 6'; Denton (yellow card) 35' (yellow-red card) 45'; Toney (yellow card) 45+5'; Naismith (yellow card) 84'	Stadium: Keepmoat Stadium; Attendance: 9,627; Referee: Carl Boyeson

16 February 2019 33	Oxford United	0–1	Peterborough United	Oxford
15:00 GMT	Hanson (yellow card) 46'; Dickie (yellow card) 70'; Browne (yellow card) 90+4'	Report	White (yellow card) 8'; Maddison (yellow card) 36'; Toney 76'; Woodyard (yellow card) 81'	Stadium: Kassam Stadium; Attendance: 6,541; Referee: Ross Joyce

23 February 2019 34	Peterborough United	1–2	Shrewsbury Town	Peterborough
15:00 GMT	Naismith 10'; Toney (red card) 27'	Report	Norburn 28' (pen.) (yellow card) 55' (yellow-red card) 62'; Campbell 36'; Beckles (yellow card) 65'; Okenabirhie (yellow card) 87'	Stadium: London Road Stadium; Attendance: 6,262; Referee: Kevin Johnson

2 March 2019 35	Peterborough United	4–2	Wycombe Wanderers	Peterborough
15:00 GMT	Godden 7', 10'; Maddison 31', 66'; Ward (yellow card) 81'; Cooper (yellow card) 90+3'	Report	Tafazolli 16' (o.g.); Jacobson (yellow card) 30'; Bloomfield 38'; Thompson (yellow card) 88'	Stadium: London Road Stadium; Attendance: 6,484; Referee: Nick Kinseley

9 March 2019 36	Bradford City	3–1	Peterborough United	Bradford
15:00 GMT	Ball (yellow card) 25'; Butterfield 70'; Doyle 83'; O'Brien 86'; Caddis (yellow card) 88'	Report	Maddison 89' (pen.); Cooper (yellow card) 90'	Stadium: Valley Parade; Referee: Matt Donohue

12 March 2019 37	AFC Wimbledon	1–0	Peterborough United	Norbiton
19:45 GMT	Sibbick (yellow card) 76'; Pigott 87' (pen.)	Report	Maddison (yellow card) 74'; Bennett (red card) 85'; Lafferty (yellow card) 86'; Reed (yellow card) 90+3'	Stadium: Kingsmeadow; Attendance: 2,737; Referee: Oliver Yates

16 March 2019 38	Peterborough United	1–2	Coventry City	Peterborough
15:00 GMT	O'Malley (yellow card) 52'; Naismith (yellow card) 62'; Tomlin (yellow card) 90+4'; Reed 90+8'	Report	Bakayoko 42'; Enobakhare 49'	Stadium: London Road Stadium; Attendance: 7,084; Referee: Michael Salisbury

23 March 2019 39	Peterborough United	2–0	Southend United	Peterborough
15:00 GMT	Maddison 41'; White 58'; Toney (yellow card) 81'	Report	Dieng (yellow card) 45+1'	Stadium: London Road Stadium; Attendance: 7,585; Referee: Alan Young

6 April 2019 40	Peterborough United	2–0	Gillingham	Peterborough
15:00 BST	Maddison 57' (pen.); Godden 85'	Report		Stadium: London Road Stadium; Attendance: 8,331; Referee: Robert Jones

13 April 2019 41	Blackpool	0–1	Peterborough United	Blackpool
15:00 BST		Report	Maddison 43'	Stadium: Bloomfield Road; Attendance: 7,477; Referee: Peter Wright

19 April 2019 42	Fleetwood Town	1–1	Peterborough United	Fleetwood
15:00 BST	Husband (yellow card) 47'; Eastham (yellow card) 87'; Biggins (yellow card) 90+2'; Hunter 90+4' (yellow card) 90+5'	Report	Maddison (penalty missed) 20' 64'; Dembélé (yellow card) 66'	Stadium: Highbury Stadium; Attendance: 2,774; Referee: Tom Nield

22 April 2019 43	Peterborough United	1–1	Sunderland	Peterborough
15:00 BST	Godden 90+1'	Report	Power 87'	Stadium: London Road Stadium; Attendance: 11,277; Referee: Antony Coggins

27 April 2019 44	Walsall	3–0	Peterborough United	Walsall
15:00 BST	Cook 45+2'; Dobson (yellow card) 48'; Lafferty 57' (o.g.); Gordon 74'	Report	Woodyard (yellow card) 61'	Stadium: Bescot Stadium; Attendance: 5,400; Referee: Martin Coy

30 April 2019 45	Portsmouth	2–3	Peterborough United	Portsmouth
19:45 BST	Close 38'; Brown (yellow card) 58'; Burgess 59'; Lowe (yellow card) 88'	Report	Tomlin 13' (yellow card) 32'; Toney 27', 75'; Ward (yellow card) 36'; Maddison (yellow card) 58'; Woodyard (yellow card) 65'	Stadium: Fratton Park; Attendance: 18,396; Referee: Dean Whitestone

4 May 2019 46	Peterborough United	3–1	Burton Albion	Peterborough
17:30 BST	Knight (yellow card) 17'; Ward 19'; Toney 35', 88'	Report	Harness (yellow card) 80'; Bradley 85'	Stadium: London Road Stadium; Attendance: 9,019; Referee: Scott Oldham

=== FA Cup ===
The first round draw was made live on BBC by Dennis Wise and Dion Dublin on 22 October. The draw for the second round was made live on BBC and BT by Mark Schwarzer and Glenn Murray on 12 November. The third round draw was made live on BBC by Ruud Gullit and Paul Ince from Stamford Bridge on 3 December 2018.

10 November 2018 First round	Bromley	1–3	Peterborough United	Bromley
15:00 GMT	Johnson 40'; Raymond (red card) 45+2'; Holland (yellow card) 45+2'	Report	Godden 45+3', 56'; Ward 84'	Stadium: Hayes Lane; Attendance: 3,107; Referee: Kevin Johnson

1 December 2018 Second round	Peterborough United	2–2	Bradford City	Peterborough
15:00 GMT	Toney 29'; Dembélé 45+1'; Godden (yellow card) 66'; Maddison (yellow card) 90+4'	Report	Caddis (yellow card) 5'; Henry (yellow card) 9'; Ball (yellow card) 32'; Mellor 84'; Colville 89'	Stadium: London Road Stadium; Attendance: 3,750; Referee: Trevor Kettle

11 December 2018 Second round replay	Bradford City	4–4 (2–3 p)	Peterborough United	Bradford
19:45 GMT	Miller 22', 72'; O'Connor (yellow card) 29'; Ball (yellow card) 35' (goal) 53'; Caddis 58'	Report	Toney 18', 20', 84' (yellow card) 37'; Maddison 45+4' (yellow card) 90+1'; Ward (yellow card) 89'; Cooper (yellow card) 105'	Stadium: Valley Parade; Attendance: 3,486; Referee: Ross Joyce
	Penalties
	Doyle (penalty scored); Henry (penalty missed); O'Brien (penalty scored); Payne (penalty missed); Caddis (penalty missed)		Maddison (penalty scored); Toney (penalty missed); Godden (penalty scored); Walker (penalty scored)

5 January 2019 Third round	Middlesbrough	5–0	Peterborough United	Middlesbrough
15:00 GMT	Leadbitter (yellow card) 45+1'; Assombalonga 47', 70'; Friend 50'; Wing 62'; Fletcher 87'	Report	White (yellow card) 33'	Stadium: Riverside Stadium; Attendance: 11,647; Referee: James Linington

=== EFL Cup ===
On 15 June 2018, the draw for the first round was made in Vietnam.

13 August 2018 First round	Queens Park Rangers	2–0	Peterborough United	Shepherd's Bush
19:00 BST	Freeman 3'; Wszolek 6'	Report		Stadium: Loftus Road; Attendance: 4,021; Referee: Gavin Ward

=== EFL Trophy ===
On 13 July 2018, the initial group stage draw bar the U21 invited clubs was announced. The draw for the second round was made live on Talksport by Leon Britton and Steve Claridge on 16 November. On 8 December, the third round draw was drawn by Alan McInally and Matt Le Tissier on Soccer Saturday. The Quarter-final draw was made conducted on Sky Sports by Don Goodman and Thomas Frank on 10 January 2019.

Pos	Lge	Team	Pld	W	PW	PL	L	GF	GA	GD	Pts	Qualification
1	L1	Luton Town	3	2	0	0	1	6	3	+3	6	Round 2
2	L1	Peterborough United	3	1	0	2	0	7	6	+1	5	Round 2
3	ACA	Brighton & Hove Albion U21	3	1	1	0	1	6	6	0	5	
4	L2	Milton Keynes Dons	3	0	1	0	2	5	9	−4	2	

Source: Sky Sports

4 September 2018 Group stages	Milton Keynes Dons	3–3 (6–5 p)	Peterborough United	Denbigh
19:45 BST	Aneke 6', 45+1'; Healey 33'	Report	Cooper 56'; Walker 87'; Godden 90'	Stadium: Stadium mk Attendance: 2,404; Referee: Brett Huxtable
	Penalties
	Cissé (penalty scored); Watson (penalty scored); Brittain (penalty scored); Healey (penalty scored); Cargill (penalty scored); Nombe (penalty scored)		Toney (penalty scored); Maddison (penalty scored); Godden (penalty scored); Cooper (penalty scored); Walker (penalty scored); Woodyard (penalty missed)

9 October 2018 Group stages	Peterborough United	2–2 (4–5 p)	Brighton & Hove Albion U21	Peterborough
19:45 BST	Godden 29'; Cummings 52'	Report	Connolly 71'; Davies 80'	Stadium: London Road Stadium; Attendance: 1,872; Referee: Dean Whitestone
	Penalties
	Godden (penalty missed); Toney (penalty scored); Ward (penalty scored); Reed (penalty scored); Dembélé (penalty scored)		Davies (penalty scored); Gyökeres (penalty scored); Normann (penalty scored); White (penalty scored); Connolly (penalty scored)

13 November 2018 Group stages	Peterborough United	2–1	Luton Town	Peterborough
19:45 GMT	Daniel 19'; Toney 36'	Report	O'Malley 73' (o.g.)	Stadium: London Road Stadium; Attendance: 2,107; Referee: Andy Woolmer

4 December 2018 Second round	Exeter City	0–2	Peterborough United	Exeter
19:15 GMT			Toney 67'; Cummings 77'	Stadium: St James Park; Attendance: 746; Referee: Alan Young

9 January 2019 Third round	Chelsea U21	1–3	Peterborough United	Fulham
19:45 GMT	Nartey 45'		Dembele 65'; Toney 72'; Maddison 74'	Stadium: Stamford Bridge; Referee: John Busby

22 January 2019 Quarter-final	Portsmouth	1–0	Peterborough United	Portsmouth
19:00 GMT	Close (yellow card) 74'; Wheeler 85'	Report		Stadium: Fratton Park; Attendance: 3,313
