= Ray Middleton =

Ray Middleton may refer to:

- Ray Middleton (actor) (1907–1984), American character actor
- Ray Middleton (footballer) (1919–1977), English football goalkeeper
- Ray Middleton (racewalker) (1936–2023), British racewalker
