= Boston United Supporters' Trust =

The Boston United Football Club Supporters' Trust
- Formation: 2005/6
- Type: Supporters' trust
- Legal status: Industrial and Provident Society
- Purpose: Football fans' advocacy
- Members: Over 100
- Affiliations: Supporters Direct
- Website: bufcst.org.uk

The Boston United Football Club Supporters' Trust is a supporters' trust of Boston United Football Club, recognised by Supporters Direct. The group, like other supporters' trusts, seeks to strengthen the influence of supporters over the destiny of their clubs through democratic supporter ownership. The trust currently owns £3000 worth of shares in the club (£12,000 shares). An annual membership costs £10 for adults and £1 for under-16s. Boston United legend Chris Cook, who scored for the Pilgrims at Wembley, was notably a board member of the trust before joining the Boston United Board of Directors.

== History ==
The Boston United Football Club Supporters’ Trust was formed halfway through the 2005/2006 season, a time when the club was managed by controversial manager Steve Evans. The trust was largely criticised in its opening months for issues such as the length of time taken to hold full board elections. Despite this, a small but respectable number of 100 people quickly joined the new Trust, which spoke out against the financial mismanagement of the club.

With the Pilgrims on the edge of extinction in the summer of 2007, and with no supporter or supporters’ groups possessing the capabilities to buy the football club, two local businessmen stepped in at the final hour to save the club. Despite league authorities kicking United down to the Northern Premier League Premier Division before the start of the 2008/2009 season, the club had made a remarkable recovery under the stewardship of Mssrs Newton & Kempster from Chestnut Homes during their first year at the club. During this time, the BUFCST, Industrial and Provident Society No. 30051R, had made much progress. The membership base had neared 200. A number of fundraisers had been held and were successful for the most part. The Santa Fun Run in late 2007 showed what could be achieved by the trust, as hundreds of Santas ran through Boston town centre to raise money for the Supporters' Trust and other charities.

In 2008 the club's chairman set the trust a target at an open meeting. It was to raise the sum of £50,000 for the club. In return, the trust would receive every Supporters’ Trust's dream, shares in the club and a seat on the board. This was an enormous boost to the BUFCST's aspirations of one day owning the club, and thereby granting fans ultimate control - as well as the everlasting assurance of the club's future. Once attendees accepted the proposition, the trust had an objective. It was originally hoped that the trust could fulfil this by giving the club two lump sums of £25,000, with the second due in 2009. This would have relieved the chairman from personally paying off the club's debts. Although it was soon realised by mid-2008 that this target was too difficult to meet.

The trust still, however, have an agreement whereby they can donate money to the club in return for shares. At this moment in time, the BUFCST are attempting to set up a fund into which fans can regularly donate small sums of money to the BUFCST, as well organising fundraising events and building its membership base up to achieve the target set. The trust is also applying for a grant from Supporters' Direct at this moment in time.

== List of board members ==
- Chairman: Melvin Moxon
- Vice-Chairman: Dr Paul Kirk-Smith
- Treasurer: Mark Hildred
- Membership Secretary: Adam Hildred
- Supporters Direct Liaison: David Whittle
- General: Andrew Chapman
- General: Mat Barker
- General: Mick Taylor
