= Matt Middleton =

English footballer

Personal information
- Full name: Matthew Young Middleton
- Date of birth: 24 October 1907
- Place of birth: Boldon Colliery, England
- Date of death: 1979 (aged 71–72)
- Position: Goalkeeper

Senior career*
Years	Team	Apps	(Gls)
- Boldon Colliery Welfare
1931–1933	Southport	63	(0)
1933–1939	Sunderland	56	(0)
	Plymouth Argyle	0	(0)
- Horden Colliery Welfare
1946–1949	Bradford City	94	(0)
1949	York City	55	(0)
- Blyth Spartans
- Murton Colliery Welfare
- * Club domestic league appearances and goals

Matthew Young Middleton (24 October 1907 – 1979) was an English footballer who played as a goalkeeper in the Football League for Southport, Sunderland, Bradford City and York City. He was born in Boldon Colliery, County Durham, the brother of Ray Middleton who also played League football.
