= Boston United F.C. =

Association football club in England

Coordinates: 52°57′23″N 0°1′43″W

Boston United
- Full name: Boston United Football Club
- Nickname: The Pilgrims
- Founded: 1933; 93 years ago
- Ground: Boston Community Stadium
- Capacity: 5,061
- Chairman: David Newton
- Manager: Paul Hurst
- League: National League
- 2025–26: National League, 12th of 24
- Website: bostonunited.co.uk
| Home colours | Away colours |

Boston United Football Club is a professional association football club based in Boston, Lincolnshire, England. The club participates in the National League, the fifth level of the English football league system.

The club is known as 'the Pilgrims' in reference to the Pilgrim Fathers, who left England and sailed to North America and settled near, though did not found, Boston, Massachusetts. The club's crest features the pilgrim fathers' ship, the Mayflower. The club's traditional colours are amber and black. They are rivals with Lincoln City, Scunthorpe United, Gainsborough Trinity and Grimsby Town. They play at the Boston Community Stadium, which was completed in 2020 with a capacity of 5,061 (2,155 seated) spectators.

The club was formed in 1933 as a successor to the short lived Boston Town. They initially competed in the Midland League, before joining the Southern League for a four-year spell in 1958. They returned to the Midland League and then joined then United Counties League, winning their first league title in 1965–66. Boston then switched to the West Midlands (Regional) League, winning the Premier Division in 1966–67 and 1967–68, before becoming founder members of the Northern Premier League in 1968. United won four Northern Premier League titles in the 1970s (1972–73, 1973–74, 1976–77 and 1977–78) and became founder members of Alliance Premier League in 1979. Boston returned to the Northern Premier League in 1993 and moved back to the Southern League Premier Division in 1998.

Boston United won the Southern League in 1999–2000 and the Conference in 2001–02 to secure a place in the Football League for the first time under the stewardship of controversial manager Steve Evans. They spent five years in the fourth tier, but entered administration in 2007 and were relegated down two divisions into the Conference North. Demoted to the Northern Premier League the next year, Boston won the Northern Premier League Premier Division play-offs in 2010 and had five unsuccessful play-off campaigns in the Conference and National League North before winning the National League North play-offs in 2024. They left their home ground York Street in the 2019 to 2020 season after dispute with the owners of York Street and a new stadium was built.

== History ==
The club was founded in 1933 as a successor to a club called Boston Town. Their first game was a 3–1 defeat at home to Grimsby Reserves on 26 August 1933, when a crowd of 1,544 watched Boston's no.7, Blessed, score United's first ever goal. They then had a moderate amount of success in various leagues, including the Midland League and Southern League.

The club's FA cup run of 1955–56 included a 6–1 victory at Derby County, then playing in Third Division North, with Geoff Hazledine scoring a hat-trick. This was a record away win by a non-League team against League opponents in the FA Cup. This set up a Third round match against Tottenham Hotspur of the Football League First Division at White Hart Lane on 7 January 1956. The match against Tottenham Hotspur was played in front of a crowd of 46,185. The Pilgrims lost 4–0, but the match was more notable for the travelling support. Over 10,000 Boston supporters attended the game. A number of special train services from Boston to King's Cross were set up for the day.

They were founder members of the Northern Premier League in 1968, of which they were champions four times, and of the Alliance Premier League (now the National League) in 1979. However, their Northern Premier League title wins were not enough to gain them election to the Football League, and when they won the title in 1978 they surprisingly missed out on league status in favour of runners-up Wigan Athletic, who took the Football League place previously held by Southport.

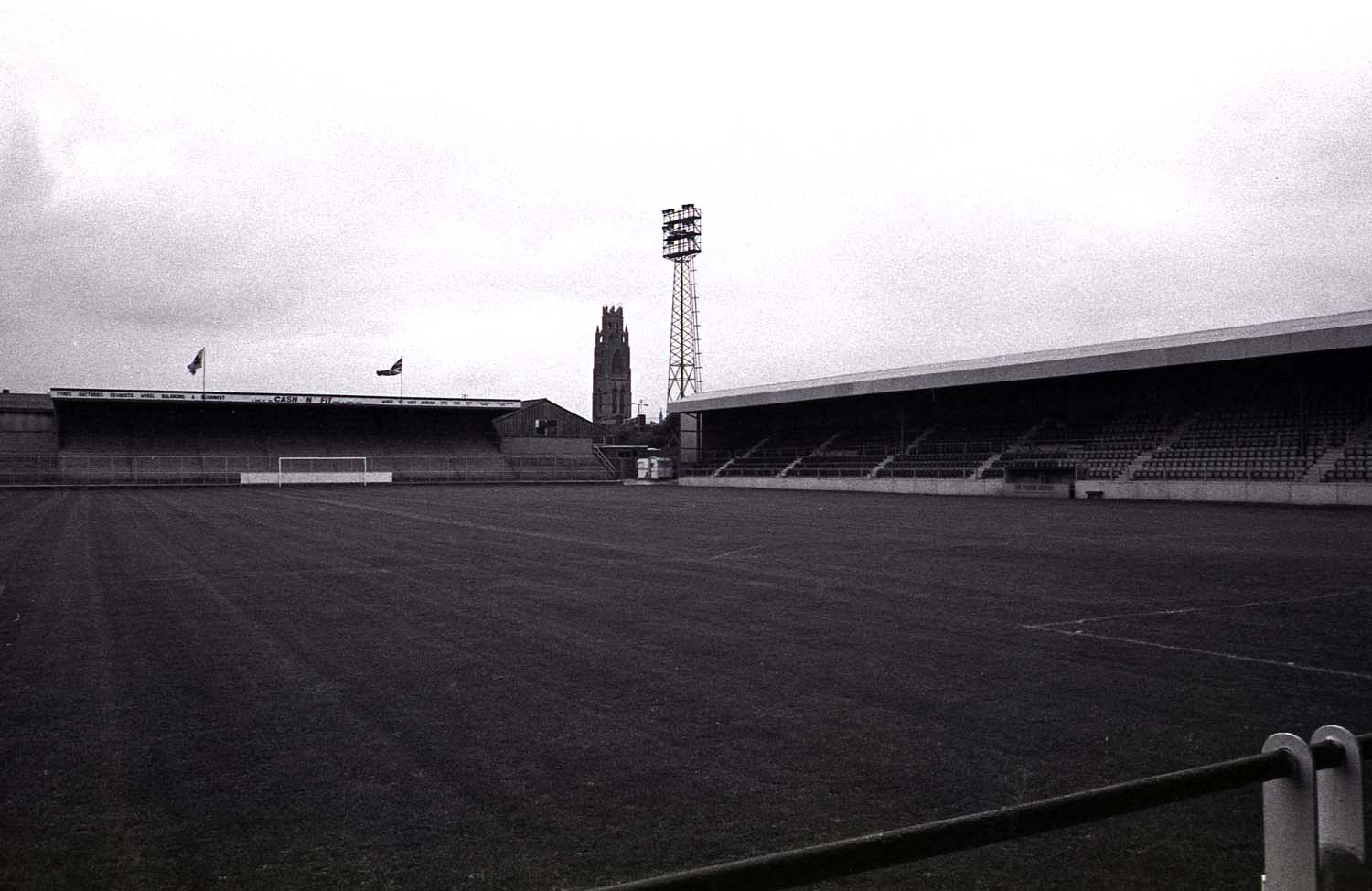
York Street in 1983

In 1985, Boston United went to Wembley for the first and only time in their history for the FA Trophy Final of the 1984–85 season, after Bob Lee scored a winning last minute goal in the 2nd leg of the semi-final against Altrincham at York Street to put the Pilgrims through. Boston lost 2–1 to Wealdstone in front of 20,775, with Chris Cook scoring United's only goal.

Boston United finished third in the Conference in 1988–89, but were unable to build on this and were relegated to the NPL in 1993. They were transferred to the Southern League, winning the title in 2000, and went fully professional in 2001. In their first season as a professional club, Boston won the Conference and were promoted to the Football League.

However, in the wake of their promotion, Boston's manager, Steve Evans, and former chairman, Pat Malkinson, were charged with breaking the Football Association's rules over the registration of players. Both men received bans from the FA, and the club were fined and docked four points from their first season in the League. This angered some, especially the Conference runners up Dagenham & Redbridge, who believed that any points deduction should have applied to the previous season, which would have meant Dagenham being promoted instead.

Youth team coach Neil Thompson was appointed as manager for Boston's maiden Football League season, and though they left it late to secure survival, they ultimately managed a creditable 15th-place finish. The following season resulted in another relegation battle, and as soon as former manager Steve Evans had served his suspension in full, Thompson was sacked and Evans was reinstated as manager, leading them to a strong late-season run and an eventual finish of 11th. Evans' return and a substantial investment in the playing squad saw Boston among the promotion favourites for the 2004–05 season, but it in fact resulted in a disappointing 16th place finish. 2005–06 would prove to be their most successful Football League season, with their finish of 11th being their joint-highest, but the club missing out on the play-offs by just five points.

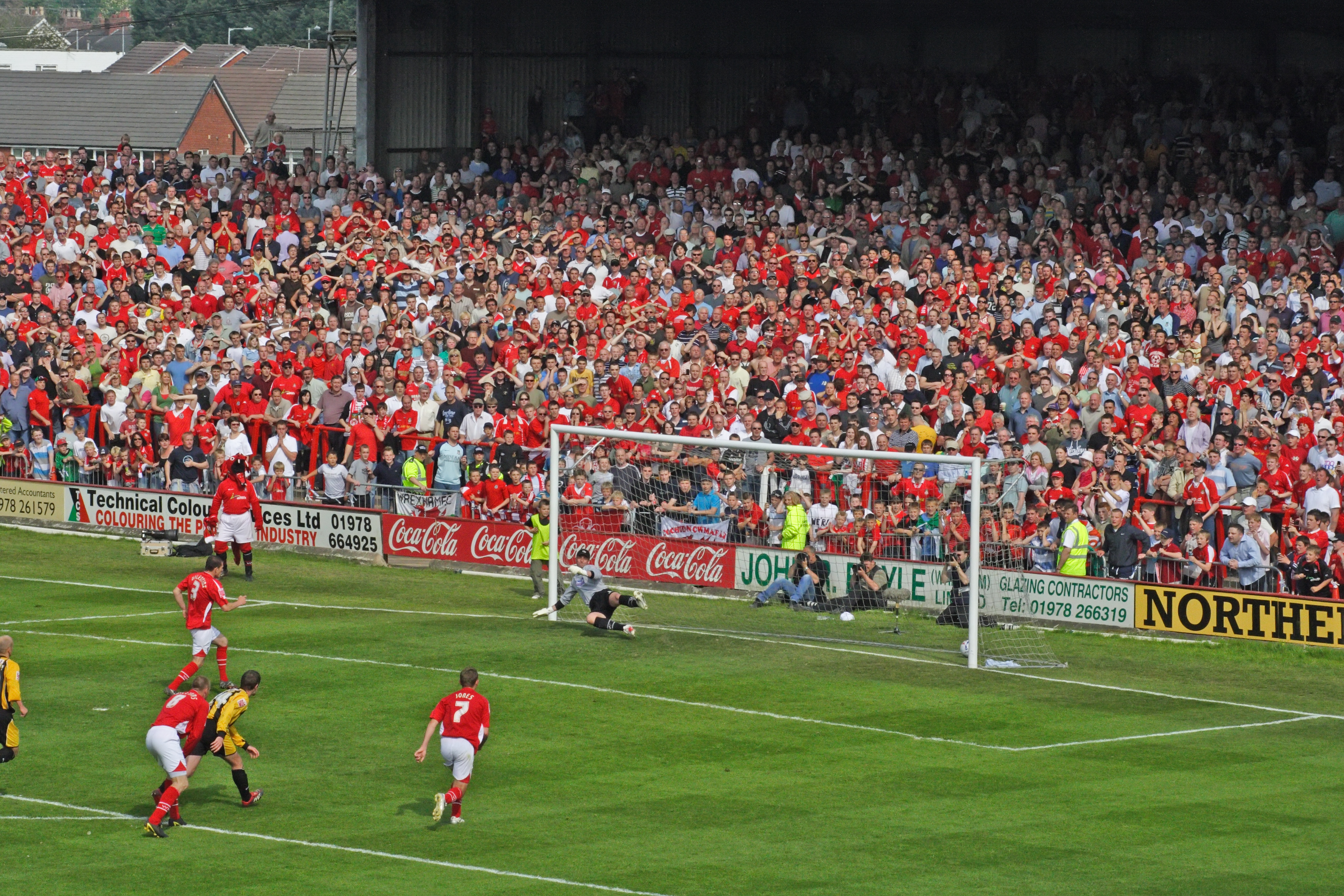
Wrexham defender Ryan Valentine scores the penalty kick against Boston United which relegated The Pilgrims.

The 2006–07 season saw Boston struggle all season long, and in May 2007, Boston were relegated from League Two on the last day of the season. Steve Evans and his assistant Paul Raynor on 27 May resigned from the club, and two days later joined Crawley Town.

Because of the relegation Boston were originally scheduled to play the 2007–08 season in the Conference National but this position was immediately placed in doubt after the club's chairman Jim Rodwell entered Boston into a Company Voluntary Arrangement late in their last game so that 10 points would then be deducted in the 2006–07 season instead of the 2007–08 season. Although this meant that Boston started the 2007–08 season without a points penalty FA rules dictated that they be demoted two divisions as a result of HM Revenue & Customs placing a restriction into the CVA of Boston not being allowed to pay football creditors 100% of what they were owed. They therefore played the 2007–08 season in the Conference North division, two steps below the Football League. This would be United's first season under the new ownership of David Newton and Neil Kempster, who took control of the club over from ex-Chairman Jim Rodwell.

Despite finishing the 2007–08 campaign in 10th place under the guidance of Tommy Taylor, United were still in administration by May 2008. This meant they were relegated again to the Northern Premier League Premier Division for the 2008–09 season. Despite coming out of administration just before the start of the new season, Boston failed to have this decision overturned. They finished the league campaign in 16th position. A much more favourable campaign the following season saw the Pilgrims finish 3rd in the league where they won the play-offs, beating Bradford Park Avenue in the final thanks to an Anthony Church extra time winner to earn promotion back to the Conference North.

Chart of table positions of Boston United in the Football League since becoming a founder member of the Alliance Premier League for the 1979-80 season.

Joint managers Rob Scott and Paul Hurst resigned from the club in 2011 and were appointed joint managers of Conference National side Grimsby Town. Club chairman David Newton revealed he was beginning legal proceedings against the pair and Grimsby Town for breach of contract. The Pilgrims appointed former Boston player Jason Lee and current player Lee Canoville as joint caretaker managers. With only seven Conference North games remaining, the pair guided United to a 3rd-place finish in the league setting up a play-off tie against Guiseley. Boston lost the first leg 1–0 at Nethermoor Park but fought back in the return leg winning 3–2 but would later miss out on penalties. After a decent start to the 2012–13 season, Boston started to drop off the promotion pace, with a 7-game winless run from November to mid-December not aiding their cause. More inconsistency followed, and Jason Lee was sacked. Graham Drury took over within the same week but left the club after less than 2 months. Dennis Greene took over soon afterwards, but after a good start could not help the club from finishing higher than a poor 16th place, just 5 points above the relegation zone.

In 2014–15, Boston reached the play-offs after a 3rd place finish. In the play-offs, Boston would again miss out on penalties, this time losing to Chorley in the semi-finals. Boston started the 2015–16 season as play-off favourites once again, but pressure mounted on Greene due to poor results. However, Boston found spells of form later in the season to ensure 5th place. Boston faced North Ferriby United in the play-offs, and won the first leg 2–0 at home, however, the second leg at Church Farm saw that lead overturned. The following season started poorly, manager Greene left the club in late November to be replaced by former Mansfield Town manager Adam Murray. He led the side to safety but was himself gone by November the following year.

With Boston occupying a relegation spot, Craig Elliott – leaving Shaw Lane to do so – took over and guided the Pilgrims to safety. Elliott's second full season in charge was to be the club's last at York Street (2019–20). The side won through four away ties in the FA Cup to reach a second round game away to Rochdale. A draw at Spotland secured York Street one last big cup tie – the League One side winning 2–1 in a televised replay with over 4,000 in attendance. The coronavirus pandemic cut short the season and Boston finished third on points per game, winning a behind closed doors semi-final against Gateshead 5–3 to secure a play-off final with Altrincham. The Robins scored the only goal of the game, the club's last match at York Street.

With the new Pilgrim Way stadium delayed due to the pandemic, the 2020–21 season, still behind closed doors, started with United playing home games at Gainsborough's Northolme. A COVID-19 outbreak in the squad meant only three home games were played at Trinity's home, as the Boston Community Stadium opened in December 2020. The season was ended as the coronavirus situation worsened over the winter. In the 2023–24 season, Boston won the National League North play-offs, defeating Brackley Town 2–1 away in the play-off final to return to the fifth tier.

After beating Gateshead F.C. 2-1, Boston confirmed their place in the National League for the 2025-26 season.

== Stadium ==
=== York Street ===
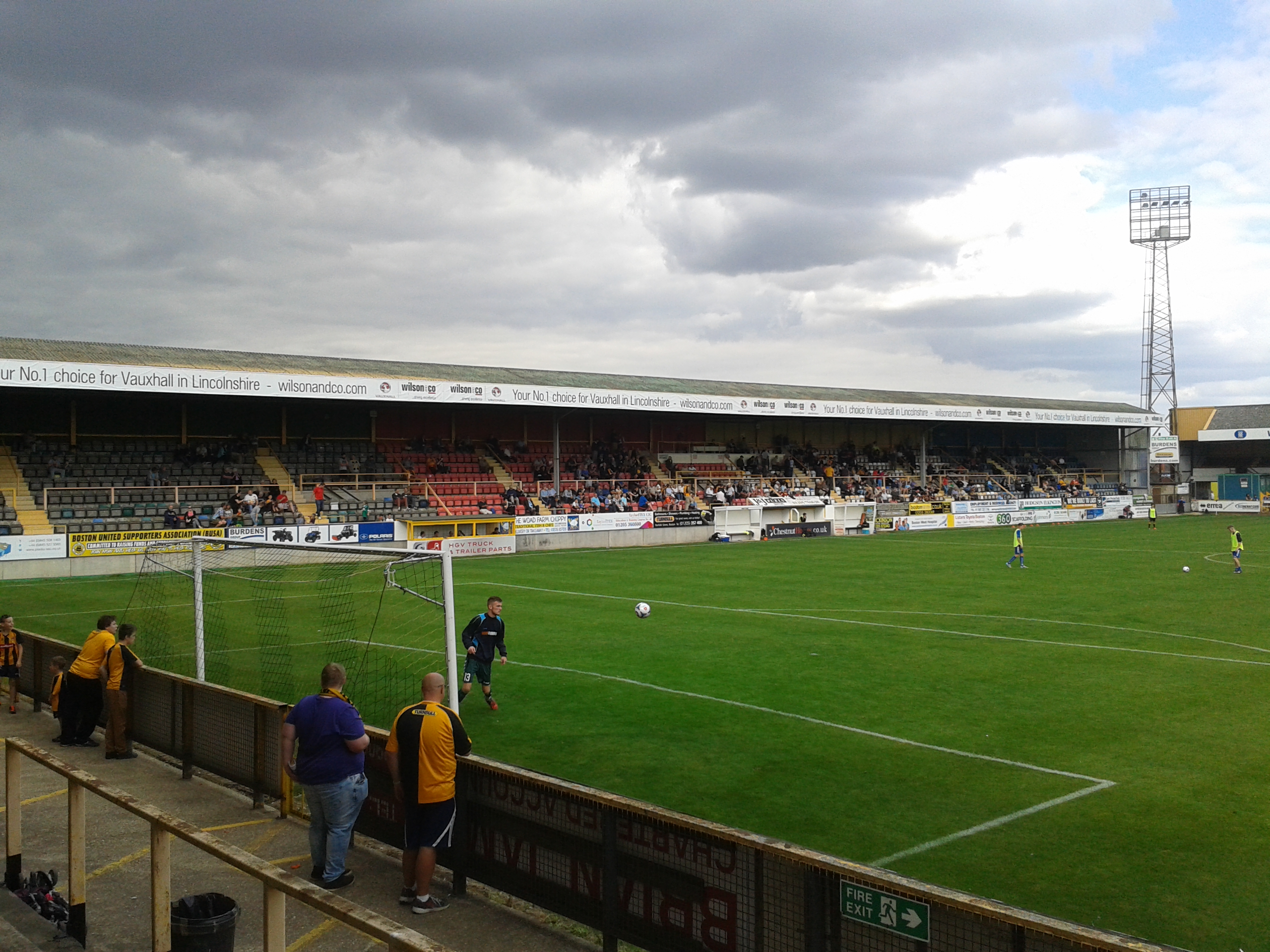
York Street

Boston United played at York Street until 2020, known as the Jakemans Stadium due to a sponsorship deal. There were four sides to the stadium: the main seated Mick George Stand; the Co-Operative York Street Stand; the Spayne Road Terrace; and the old away end—known as the Jakemans Stand and then turned into a home stand. The away fans sat in a section of the York Street Stand.

Former club chairman Jon Sotnick claimed it was not up to Football League standards and called for a new ground during the Pilgrims' time in the Football League. Planning applications were made to Boston Borough Council in June 2006, but the council turned down the application. The ground had a total capacity of 6,643.

=== Boston Community Stadium ===
The club built a new stadium outside the town, and on 10 April 2019 announced that the 2019–20 season was to be their last at York Street. The ground's capacity is 5,061.

For the beginning of the 2020–21 season, the club were granted permission to use Gainsborough Trinity's Northolme as their home ground temporarily whilst finishing touches were applied to their new stadium.

The club played its first game at the Boston Community Stadium on 5 December 2020, resulting in a 2–0 home defeat to Chorley in the National League North. Due to COVID-19 restrictions, fans were not able to visit the new stadium until July 2021 for a friendly against Lincoln City which Boston won 5–0.

== Financial problems ==
On 4 December 2006, Boston's plan to relocate to a new stadium on The Boardsides was unanimously rejected by Boston Borough Council. This plunged the club's future into serious doubt. Chairman James Rodwell said the club's future was "hanging in the balance" because York Street did not have the facilities to allow the club to operate at a profit, and a ground move was required to wipe out the club's debts. Rodwell confirmed that he would be meeting with shareholders over the next couple of days to determine the best course of action, but did admit that the club's future was ultimately now in the hands of HM Revenue and Customs, who were owed a sizeable six-figure sum by the club.

In a statement he released to the club's official website on 5 December he said: "The club's financial situation at the present moment is dire. I would urge all supporters and anybody interested in the future of the football club, be that investors or potential purchasers, to come forward immediately".

In November 2006, Boston manager Steve Evans and his former chairman Pat Malkinson pleaded guilty to "conspiring to cheat the public revenue between 1997 and 2002". Both were given suspended jail sentences.

In May 2007, Boston entered into a Company Voluntary Arrangement towards the end of their last game of the season when they knew they would be relegated to the Conference. This allowed them to avoid a points deduction in the next season, but has proved a controversial move.

On 10 June 2007, the Football Conference's annual general meeting voted in favour of demoting Boston United to the Conference North, stating that the terms of the Company Voluntary Agreement which Boston entered was behind the decision. Altrincham were subsequently spared relegation for the second season running. Chief executive John Moules released this statement:

"Because Boston United are in breach of certain rules, it was felt Blue Square North was the best place for them. HM Revenue and Customs put a caveat on that CVA that Boston could not pay football creditors. That breaks Football Association, Football League and Football Conference rules and regulations. We're giving Boston the opportunity to re-establish themselves as a leading club outside the Football League. They believe the decision we have made is fair and just, and they are not going to appeal. We had meetings all day on Friday with Boston United and then informed Altrincham that they were staying up."

On 4 July 2007, Chestnut Homes, a local housing development company, announced that they had acquired Boston United FC.

In a statement at a press conference the new chairman David Newton said: "... we are happy to sit here today and make certain pledges to the loyal supporters of the club. While we are involved in the club, the club will be whiter than white. While we are here, everyone will be paid. We will be prudent in the management of the club's finances. We will strive for excellence on and off the pitch. As finances permit, we will develop the youth side of the club, and if managed well that should pay dividends in the medium to long term for the club. Above all, we will try to rebuild the reputation of this football club."

During the summer of 2007, Boston lost their entire squad except for Stewart Talbot and Paul Ellender, and new manager Tommy Taylor had to start from scratch. Nevertheless, at the end of the season it was announced Boston would be expelled from the Conference league structure after the club failed to exit administration by 10 May deadline. The Conference is the only league in the world to have this appendix, which is not a rule as such, but only a guideline to be used at the League's discretion. The Pilgrims came out of administration before the end of the summer.

== Kit ==
When founded in 1933, Boston United inherited a kit of blue shirts, white shorts and black socks from the wound-up Boston Football Club. Later that year, these kits were changed to a black shirt with a large white 'V', a design maintained until 1937. After this, United switched to white shirts and black shorts and socks. After World War II, Boston United reverted to blue shirts of different shades with either black or white shorts and socks.

The currently colour scheme of amber and black has been in place since 1951, although the design has varied from season to season. In recent times, Boston United have had their kits supplied by Umbro (1988–90), Paulas Benara (1990–2005), Vandanel (2006–10), Errea (2010–2016), Nike (2016–2020), Adidas (2020–2023), and Umbro (2023–present).

=== Shirt sponsors and manufacturers ===
Table of kit suppliers and shirt sponsors appear below:

| Year | Kit Manufacturer | Main Shirt Sponsor | Back of Shirt Sponsor |
|---|---|---|---|
| 1933–1950 | Umbro | None | None |
| 1950–1983 | Admiral | None | None |
| 1983–1987 | Lowland's Sportswear | None | None |
| 1987–1988 | Umbro | Burdens Tractors | None |
| 1988–1990 | Umbro | Batemans Brewery | None |
| 1990–1993 | Influence | Batemans Brewery | None |
| 1993–1997 | Paulas Benara | Batemans Brewery | None |
| 1997–1998 | Paulas Benara | Vegas | None |
| 1998–1999 | Paulas Benara | Wards | None |
| 1999–2000 | Paulas Benara | Stantons Metsä Prima | None |
| 2000–2003 | Paulas Benara | Finnforest | None |
| 2003–2004 | Paulas Benara | Oldrids (Home); Oldrids Downtown (Away) | None |
| 2004–2006 | Paulas Benara | Chestnut Homes | None |
| 2006–2007 | Vandanel | Chestnut Homes | Haart |
| 2007–2009 | Vandanel | Cropley's Suzuki | AC Williams |
| 2009–2010 | Vandanel | Cropley's Suzuki | Chris Cook Print |
| 2010–2012 | Errea | T&B Containers | Chris Cook Print |
| 2012–2013 | Errea | Thurlby Motors | T&B Containers |
| 2013–2016 | Errea | Kia | Turnbull |
| 2016–2020 | Nike | Kia | Turnbull |
| 2020–2023 | Adidas | Kia | Turnbull |
| 2023–2026 | Umbro | Kia | Turnbull |
| 2026- | New Balance | Kia | Turnbull |

== Players ==
=== Current squad ===
As of 25 August 2026

Note: Flags indicate national team as defined under FIFA eligibility rules; some limited exceptions apply. Players may hold more than one non-FIFA nationality.

| No. | Pos. | Nation | Player |
|---|---|---|---|
| 1 | GK | ENG | Luke Faxon (on loan from Sheffield United) |
| 2 | DF | ENG | Sai Sachdev (on loan from Sheffield United) |
| 3 | DF | ENG | Lewis Shipley |
| 4 | DF | ENG | Connor Teale |
| 5 | DF | ENG | George Ward |
| 6 | DF | IRL | Niall Canavan |
| 7 | MF | ENG | Jack Holmes |
| 8 | MF | IRL | Gavan Holohan |
| 9 | FW | ENG | Tom Cursons |
| 10 | FW | SCO | Connor McBride |
| 11 | FW | ENG | Ken Aboh (on loan from Norwich City) |
| 12 | DF | ENG | Jacob Scott |
| 13 | GK | ENG | Louis Chadwick |

| No. | Pos. | Nation | Player |
|---|---|---|---|
| 14 | FW | ENG | Lenell John-Lewis |
| 15 | FW | WAL | Ollie Bostock (on loan from West Bromwich Albion) |
| 16 | MF | ENG | Levi Sutton |
| 18 | FW | ENG | Lennon Wheeldon |
| 20 | DF | ENG | Jake Rooney |
| 21 | MF | ENG | Arjan Raikhy |
| 22 | MF | WAL | Ben Hammond |
| 23 | DF | ENG | Jamie Grimes (on loan from Chesterfield) |
| 27 | DF | GIB | Kai Mauro |
| 28 | MF | ENG | Terrell Agyemang |
| 30 | MF | GIB | Nicholas Pozo |
| — | MF | ENG | Dylan Hill |

==== Out on loan ====
Note: Flags indicate national team as defined under FIFA eligibility rules; some limited exceptions apply. Players may hold more than one non-FIFA nationality.

| No. | Pos. | Nation | Player |
|---|---|---|---|
| 25 | MF | ENG | Liam Waldock (at Worksop Town) |

== Coaching staff ==
As of 1 June 2026

| Manager | (England) Paul Hurst |
| Assistant manager | (England) Luke Waterfall |
| First team coach | (England) Jamie Raynor |
| Goal keeping coach | (England) Ian Pledger |
| Head of medical services | (England) Jumar Kacar |
| Performance Coach | (England) Mark Laws |
| Kitman | (England) Jason Hatfield |

== Managerial history ==
Below is a list of Boston United managers in chronological order:

| Dates | Manager |
|---|---|
| 1934–1935 | Jimmy Cringan |
| 1935–1936 | Willie Vaughton |
| 1936–1937 | Arthur Greaves |
| 1937–1939 | Fred Tunstall |
| 1945–1947 | Fred Tunstall |
| 1948–1949 | Jimmy McGraham |
| 1950–1952 | Jimmy Ithell |
| 1952–1954 | Fred Tunstall |
| 1954–1957 | Ray Middleton |
| 1957–1960 | Ray King |
| 1960–1961 | Ray Middleton |
| 1961–1964 | Paul Todd |
| 1964–1965 | Fred Tunstall |
| 1965–1969 | Don Donovan |
| 1969–1972 | Jim Smith |
| 1972–1975 | Keith Jobling |
| 1975–1976 | Howard Wilkinson |
| 1976–1977 | Freddie Taylor and Gordon Bolland |
| 1977–1979 | Mickey Walker |
| 1979–1981 | Albert Phelan |
| 1981–1984 | John Froggatt |
| 1984–1986 | Arthur Mann |
| 1986–1987 | Ray O'Brien |
| 1987–1990 | George Kerr |
| 1990–1992 | Dave Cusack |
| 1992–1994 | Peter Morris |
| 1994–1996 | Mel Sterland |
| 1996–1998 | Greg Fee |
| 1998–2002 | Steve Evans |
| 2002–2004 | Neil Thompson |
| 2004 | James Rodwell (caretaker) |
| 2004–2007 | Steve Evans |
| 2007–2008 | Tommy Taylor |
| 2008–2009 | Steve Welsh |
| 2009–2011 | Rob Scott and Paul Hurst |
| 2011–2012 | Jason Lee and Lee Canoville |
| 2012 | Jason Lee |
| 2012–2013 | Graham Drury |
| 2013–2016 | Dennis Greene |
| 2016–2017 | Adam Murray |
| 2017–2022 | Craig Elliott |
| 2022 | Paul Cox |
| 2022–2024 | Ian Culverhouse |
| 2024–2026 | Graham Coughlan |
| 2026- | Paul Hurst |

== Records and statistics ==
- Highest attendance: 11,000 vs. Derby County, FA Cup third round replay, 9 January 1974
- Largest Football League victory: 6–0 vs. Shrewsbury Town, 21 December 2002
- Heaviest defeat: 9–2 vs. AFC Fylde, 19 November 2016
- Largest FA Cup win: 10–0 vs. Bilsthorpe Colliery, FA Cup preliminary round, 18 September 1937
- FA Cup preliminary round – 10–0 vs Bilsthorpe Colliery (18 September 1937)
- First club to start a Football League season on fewer than 0 points
- Largest FA Cup away win for a non-League team against a Football League opponent
  - 6–1 vs. Derby County, FA Cup second round, 10 December 1955

=== Cup runs ===
- Best FA Cup performance: Third round, 1955–56, 1973–74, 2004–05
- Best League Cup performance: Second round, 2004–05
- Best League Trophy performance: Second round, 2002–03 (Southern section), 2003–04 (Southern section), 2005–06 (Northern section)
- Best FA Trophy performance: Runners-up, 1984–85

== Honours ==
League

- Football Conference (level 5)
  - Champions: 2001–02
- National League North (level 6)
  - Play-off winners: 2024
- Southern League
  - Champions: 1999–2000
  - Runners-up: 1998–99
- Northern Premier League
  - Champions: 1972–73, 1973–74, 1976–77, 1977–78
  - Runners-up: 1995–96, 1997–98
- West Midlands League
  - Champions: 1966–67, 1967–68
- United Counties League
  - Champions: 1965–66
- Central Alliance League
  - Champions: 1961–62

Cup

- FA Trophy
  - Runners-up: 1984–85
- Northern Premier League Challenge Cup
  - Winners: 1973–74, 1975–76, 2009–10
- Northern Premier League Challenge Shield
  - Winners: 1973–74, 1974–75, 1976–77, 1977–78
- Lincolnshire Senior Cup
  - Winners: 1934–35, 1936–37, 1937–38, 1945–46, 1949–50, 1954–55, 1955–56, 1956–57, 1959–60, 1976–77, 1978–79, 1985–86, 1987–88, 1988–89, 2005–06, 2025–26
- Non-League Champions of Champions Cup
  - Winners: 1972–73, 1976–77
- East Anglian Cup
  - Winners: 1960–61
- Eastern Professional Floodlight League
  - Winners: 1971–72

== See also ==
- Boston United Supporters' Trust
