= Alex Woodyard =

English footballer (born 1993)

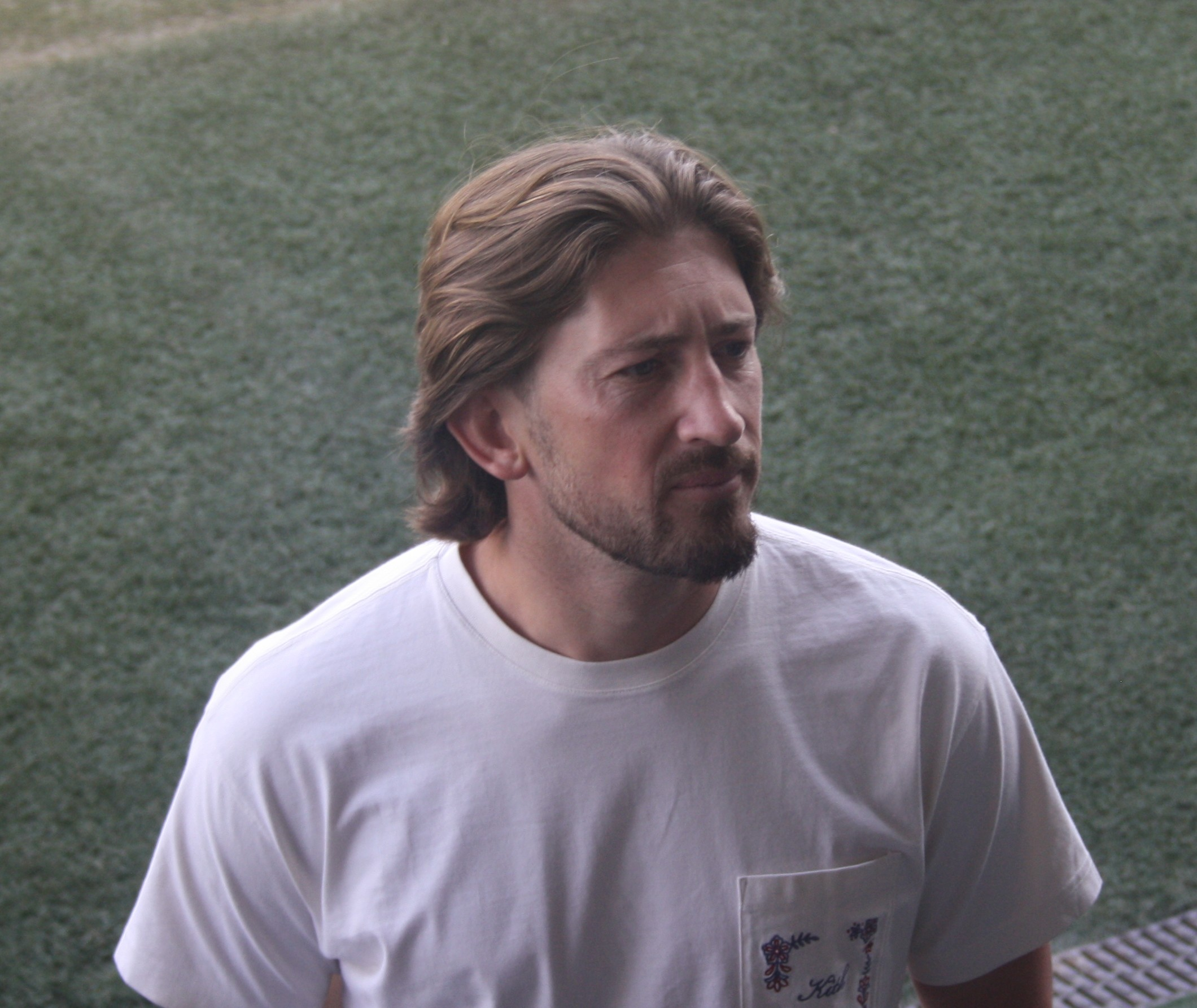
- Woodyward in 2025.

Personal information
- Full name: Alexander James Woodyard
- Date of birth: 3 May 1993 (age 33)
- Place of birth: Gravesend, England
- Height: 5 ft 9 in (1.75 m)
- Position: Midfielder

Team information
- Current team: Folkestone Invicta

Youth career
- –2009: Charlton Athletic
- 2009–2010: Southend United

Senior career*
Years	Team	Apps	(Gls)
2010–2013	Southend United	8	(0)
2011	→ Farnborough (loan)	10	(2)
2013	→ Braintree Town (loan)	12	(0)
2013–2014	Dartford	37	(0)
2014–2015	Concord Rangers	36	(1)
2015–2016	Braintree Town	44	(1)
2016–2018	Lincoln City	91	(3)
2018–2020	Peterborough United	57	(0)
2020	→ Tranmere Rovers (loan)	11	(1)
2020–2023	AFC Wimbledon	110	(2)
2023–2024	York City	30	(0)
2024–2025	Colchester United	14	(0)
2025–2026	Sutton United	16	(0)
2026	→ Folkestone Invicta (loan)	15	(0)
2026–	Folkestone Invicta	0	(0)

International career
2015–2016	England C	5	(0)
- * Club domestic league appearances and goals as of 12:43, 29 May 2026 (UTC)

Alexander James Woodyard (born 3 May 1993) is a professional footballer who plays as a midfielder for National League South club Folkestone Invicta.

== Career ==
Woodyard started his career in the youth system of Charlton Athletic, but moved to Southend United as a sixteen-year-old in 2010, starting a two-year scholarship. He made his professional debut in December 2010, starting in their 3–1 away loss to Burton Albion in League Two. He had already made three appearances at the age of seventeen and was one of only two players to receive a professional contract from his age group in the summer of 2011. In August 2011, he was sent out on loan to Conference South side Farnborough for an initial month along with George Smith to gain some first team experience. His loan was later extended until the end of November, with Woodyard making thirteen appearances for the club scoring once in a 4–3 win over Basingstoke Town.

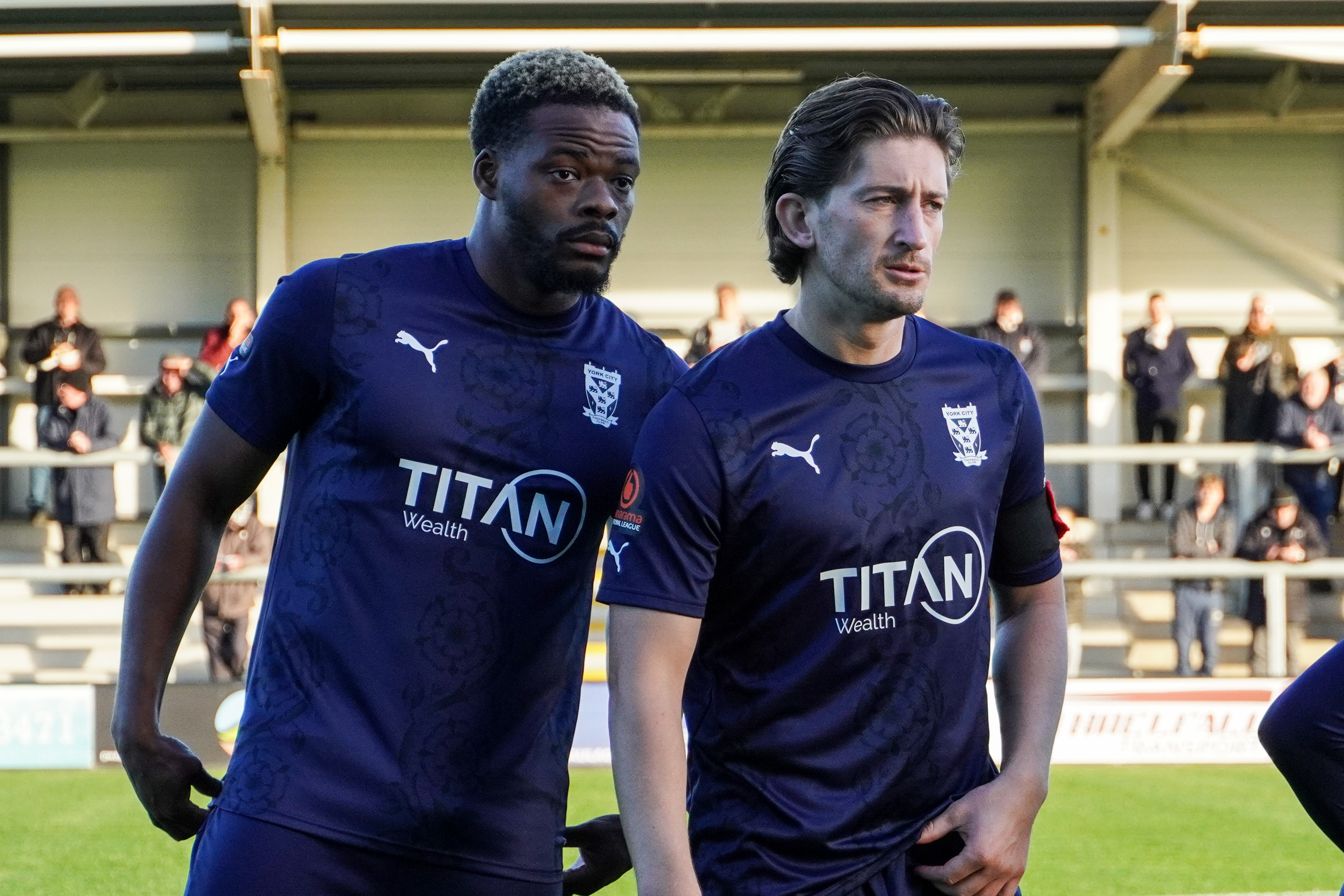
Woodyard (right) with teammate Dipo Akinyemi during their time at York City.

Woodyard made his first Southend appearance in eighteen months in October 2012, a 3–1 win over Dagenham & Redbridge in the Football League Trophy. He impressed on his return to Southend, winning the Shrimpers Player of the Month award in October and November 2012. In March 2013, he joined Conference Premier side Braintree Town on a one-month loan. He made a total of twelve appearances as Braintree finished in the top-half of the table. Upon his return to Southend in May 2013, he was told that his contract would not be renewed as he was deemed surplus to requirements by new manager Phil Brown. Woodyard spent a total of four years with the club, making fifteen first team appearances.

In August 2013, he signed for Conference Premier side Dartford after impressing in pre-season friendlies. He had a turbulent start to his Dartford career, taking abuse from the fans despite solid performances on the right wing. In February 2014, he endeared himself to the fans after an impressive performance against Aldershot Town. In May 2014, after making 43 appearances and following Dartford's relegation to the Conference South, he was invited back for pre-season.

In June 2014, he turned down the opportunity to stay on at Dartford and signed for Conference South side Concord Rangers. After a successful stay at Concord Rangers, where he made 36 appearances and scored one goal, Woodyard joined National League side Braintree Town.

In June 2016, Woodyard signed for Lincoln City, following his Braintree manager Danny Cowley to Sincil Bank. He ended the 2016–17 season as Lincoln's player of the season as they won promotion back to the football league, before signing a new two-year deal on 6 July 2017. On 30 May 2018, he joined Peterborough United for an undisclosed fee after the release clause in his contract was met.

On 3 January 2020 it was announced that Woodyard would join Tranmere Rovers on loan for the remainder of the season.

On 12 June 2020, Woodyard got released by Peterborough United after a 2-year stint at the club. Within those two years he managed 54 appearances for the club and was also captain in the 2018/19 season.

In August 2020 he signed for AFC Wimbledon. He scored his first goal for the club on 20 April 2021 in a 2–1 win against Oxford United. He notably scored against rivals MK Dons in an April 2022 1-1 draw.

On 26 July 2023, Woodyard had his contract with AFC Wimbledon terminated by mutual consent to allow him to join National League club York City on a two-year deal.

On 4 July 2024, Woodyard signed a one-year contract with Colchester United and reunited with manager Danny Cowley making it their fourth club working together.

On 3 January 2025, having had his contract with Colchester United terminated, Woodyard joined National League side Sutton United on an eighteen-month deal. On 20 January 2026, he joined Isthmian League Premier Division club Folkestone Invicta on loan for the remainder of the season.

In May 2026, having helped the club to promotion to National League South, Woodyard returned to Folkestone Invicta on a permanent deal.

== Career statistics ==
As of end of 2024–25 season

Appearances and goals by club, season and competition
Club	Season	League			FA Cup		League Cup		Other		Total	
Club	Season	Division	Apps	Goals	Apps	Goals	Apps	Goals	Apps	Goals	Apps	Goals
Southend United	2010–11	League Two	3	0	0	0	0	0	0	0	3	0
Southend United	2011–12	League Two	0	0	0	0	0	0	0	0	0	0
Southend United	2012–13	League Two	5	0	3	0	0	0	4 (Note: Appearances in Football League Trophy)	0	12	0
Southend United	Total		8	0	3	0	0	0	4	0	15	0
Farnborough (loan)	2011–12	Conference South	10	2	2	0	—		0	0	12	2
Braintree Town (loan)	2012–13	Conference Premier	12	0	0	0	—		0	0	12	0
Dartford	2013–14	Conference Premier	37	0	3	0	—		2 (Note: Appearances in FA Trophy)	0	42	0
Concord Rangers	2014–15	Conference South	36	1	3	0	—		3	0	42	1
Braintree Town	2015–16	National League	44	1	3	0	—		4 (Note: Two appearances in National League play-offs, two in FA Trophy)	0	51	1
Lincoln City	2016–17	National League	45	1	9	0	—		3	0	57	1
Lincoln City	2017–18	League Two	46	2	1	0	1	0	8 (Note: Two appearances in English Football League play-offs, six in EFL Trophy)	0	56	2
Lincoln City	Total		230	7	21	0	1	0	20	0	272	7
Peterborough United	2018–19	League One	43	0	4	0	1	0	3 (Note: Appearances in EFL Trophy)	0	51	0
Peterborough United	2019–20	League One	14	0	3	0	0	0	2	0	19	0
Peterborough United	Total		57	0	7	0	1	0	5	0	70	0
Tranmere Rovers (loan)	2019–20	League One	11	1	0	0	0	0	0	0	11	1
AFC Wimbledon	2020–21	League One	40	1	1	0	1	0	3	0	45	1
AFC Wimbledon	2021–22	League One	36	1	3	0	1	0	0	0	40	1
AFC Wimbledon	2022–23	League Two	34	0	2	0	0	0	2	0	38	0
AFC Wimbledon	Total		121	3	6	0	2	0	5	0	134	3
York City	2023–24	National League	30	0	3	0	0	0	0	0	33	0
York City	Total		30	0	3	0	0	0	0	0	33	0
Colchester United	2024–25	League Two	14	0	1	0	2	0	2	0	19	0
Colchester United	Total		14	0	1	0	2	0	2	0	19	0
Sutton United	2024–25	League Two	12	0	0	0	0	0	2	0	14	0
Sutton United	Total		12	0	0	0	0	0	2	0	14	0
Career Total			472	10	41	0	6	0	38	0	557	10

== Honours ==
Lincoln City

- National League: 2016–17
- EFL Trophy: 2017–18

Folkestone Invicta

- Isthmian League Premier Division: 2025–26
