= Ben White (footballer) =

English footballer (born 1997)

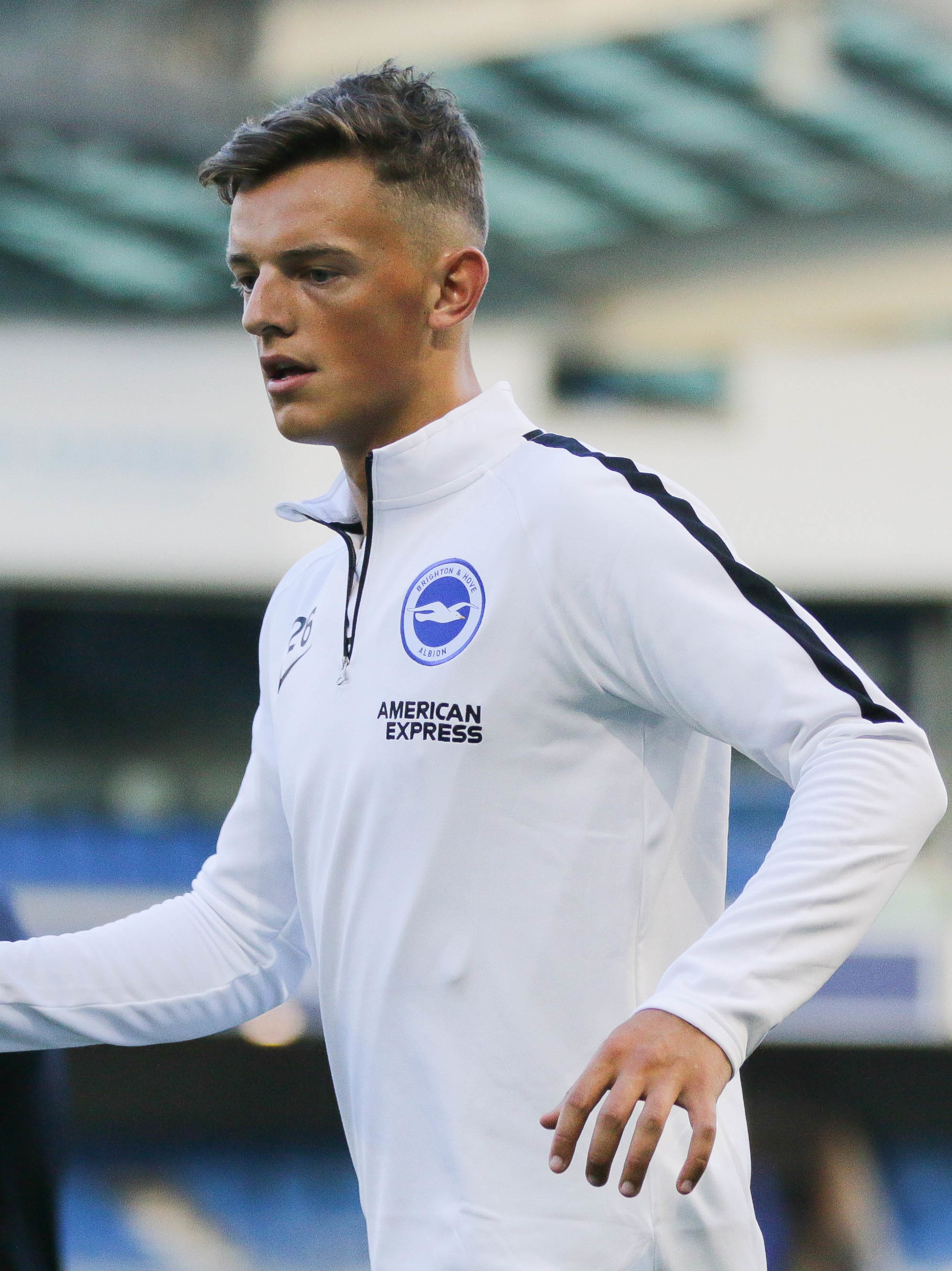
- White with Brighton & Hove Albion in 2018

Personal information
- Full name: Benjamin William White
- Date of birth: 8 October 1997 (age 29)
- Place of birth: Poole, England
- Height: 6 ft 1 in (1.86 m)
- Position: Defender

Team information
- Current team: Arsenal
- Number: 4

Youth career
- 2006–2014: Southampton
- 2014–2016: Brighton & Hove Albion

Senior career*
Years	Team	Apps	(Gls)
2016–2021	Brighton & Hove Albion	36	(0)
2017–2018	→ Newport County (loan)	42	(1)
2018–2019	→ Peterborough United (loan)	15	(1)
2019–2020	→ Leeds United (loan)	46	(1)
2021–	Arsenal	143	(6)

International career^{‡}
2021–	England	8	(2)
Medal record
Men's football
Representing England
UEFA European Championship
Runner-up	2020 Europe
- * Club domestic league appearances and goals as of 21:15, 24 October 2026 (UTC) ‡ National team caps and goals as of 20:10, 15 November 2026 (UTC)

Benjamin William White (born 8 October 1997) is an English professional footballer who plays as a right-back or centre-back for Premier League club Arsenal and the England national team.

White began his senior club career at age 18 in 2016 with Brighton & Hove Albion. He spent time with Newport County, Peterborough United, and Leeds United on successive loans between 2016 and 2019, winning the Championship with Leeds. After a season in the Brighton first team, White signed for Arsenal in a transfer worth up to £50 million, becoming, at the time, Brighton's most expensive sale and Arsenal's most expensive defender.

White made his senior international debut for England in 2021 and was selected as part of the England squads for UEFA Euro 2020 and the 2022 FIFA World Cup.

== Club career ==
=== Brighton & Hove Albion ===
==== Early career ====
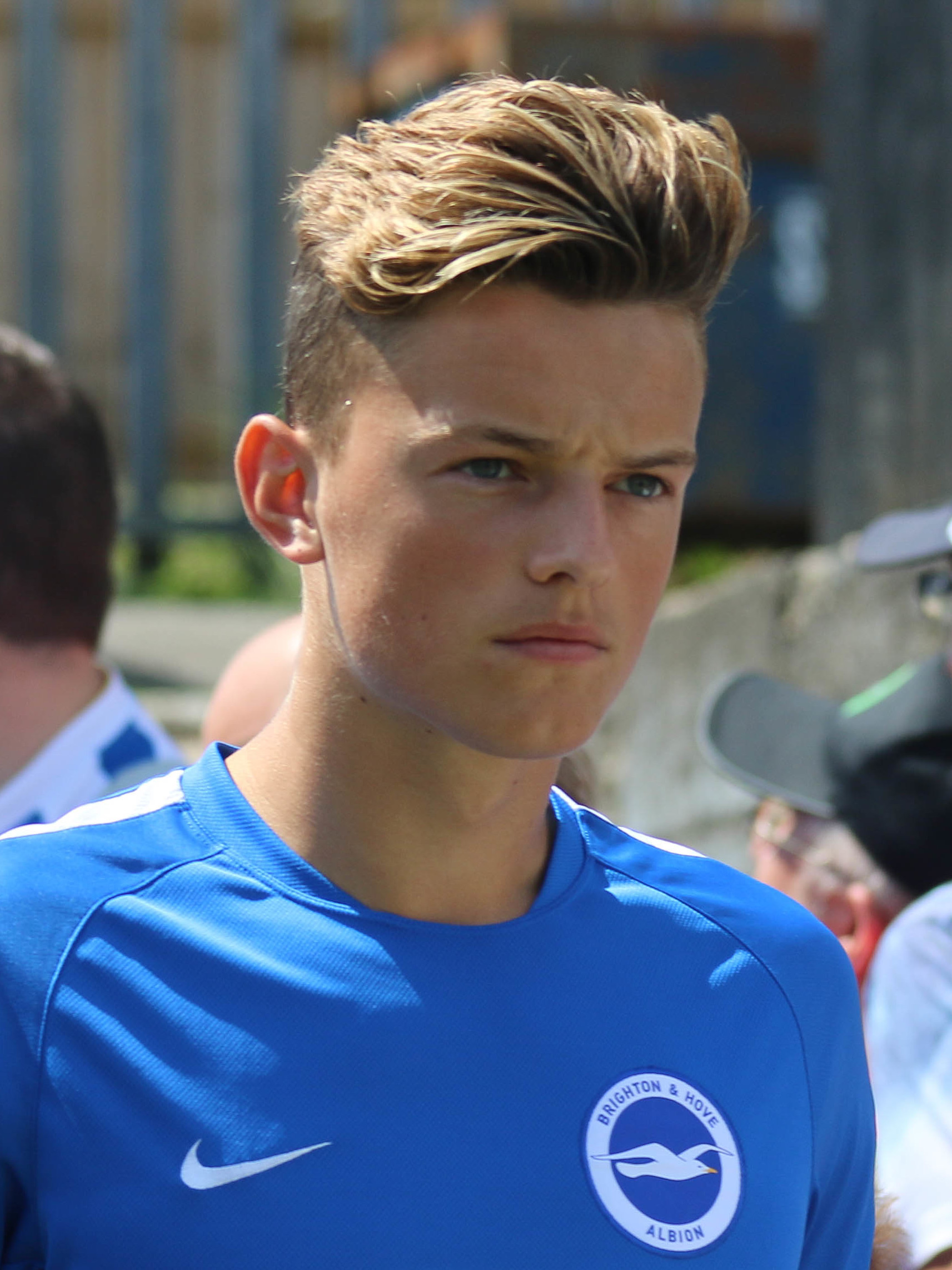
White with Brighton & Hove Albion in 2015

Born in Poole, Dorset, White started his youth career at Southampton before being released at the age of 16, after eight years at the club. He was signed by Brighton & Hove Albion, following interest from Bristol City and Leicester City, where he initially joined their academy.

==== 2016–17 season ====
For the first league match of the 2016–17 season on 6 August 2016, White was an unused substitute in a 0–0 draw away to Derby County. White made his professional football debut three days later on 9 August, playing the entire game of the first round EFL Cup match in a 4–0 home victory over Colchester United. White continued to be an unused substitute in the next three league games against Nottingham Forest, Rotherham United and Reading. His second start for Brighton came in the next round of the EFL Cup again playing the whole match away against Oxford United on 23 August, where Brighton won 4–2. White was once again an unused substitute on 18 March 2017, this time against Leeds United. White also appeared 3 times during the EFL Trophy before Brighton U21s were eliminated in round three by Coventry City.

==== 2017–18 season: Loan to Newport County ====
On 1 August 2017, White signed for League Two club Newport County on loan until the end of the 2017–18 season in what was described by manager Michael Flynn as a "big coup for the club." White made his debut for Newport on 8 August 2017 in a 2–0 victory over Southend United in the first round of the EFL Cup. He made his debut on 12 August 2017 in a 1–1 draw versus Crewe Alexandra. White scored his first career goal on 21 November for Newport against Barnet in a 2–1 home defeat.

On 7 January 2018, White started for Newport in a 2–1 home win over Championship club Leeds United in the FA Cup third round, which meant Newport progressed to the FA Cup fourth round for the first time since the 1978–79 FA Cup. In the following round, Newport were drawn at home to Premier League team Tottenham Hotspur. On 27 January 2018, White started the match as Newport drew 1–1 to force a replay at Tottenham's temporary home ground Wembley Stadium, with White praised for his performance against Harry Kane.

On 15 March 2018, White won the South Wales Argus Player of the Year Award for Newport for the 2017–18 season. At the awards ceremony, manager Michael Flynn described White as "the best loan signing the club has ever made."

==== 2018–19 season: Loan to Peterborough United ====
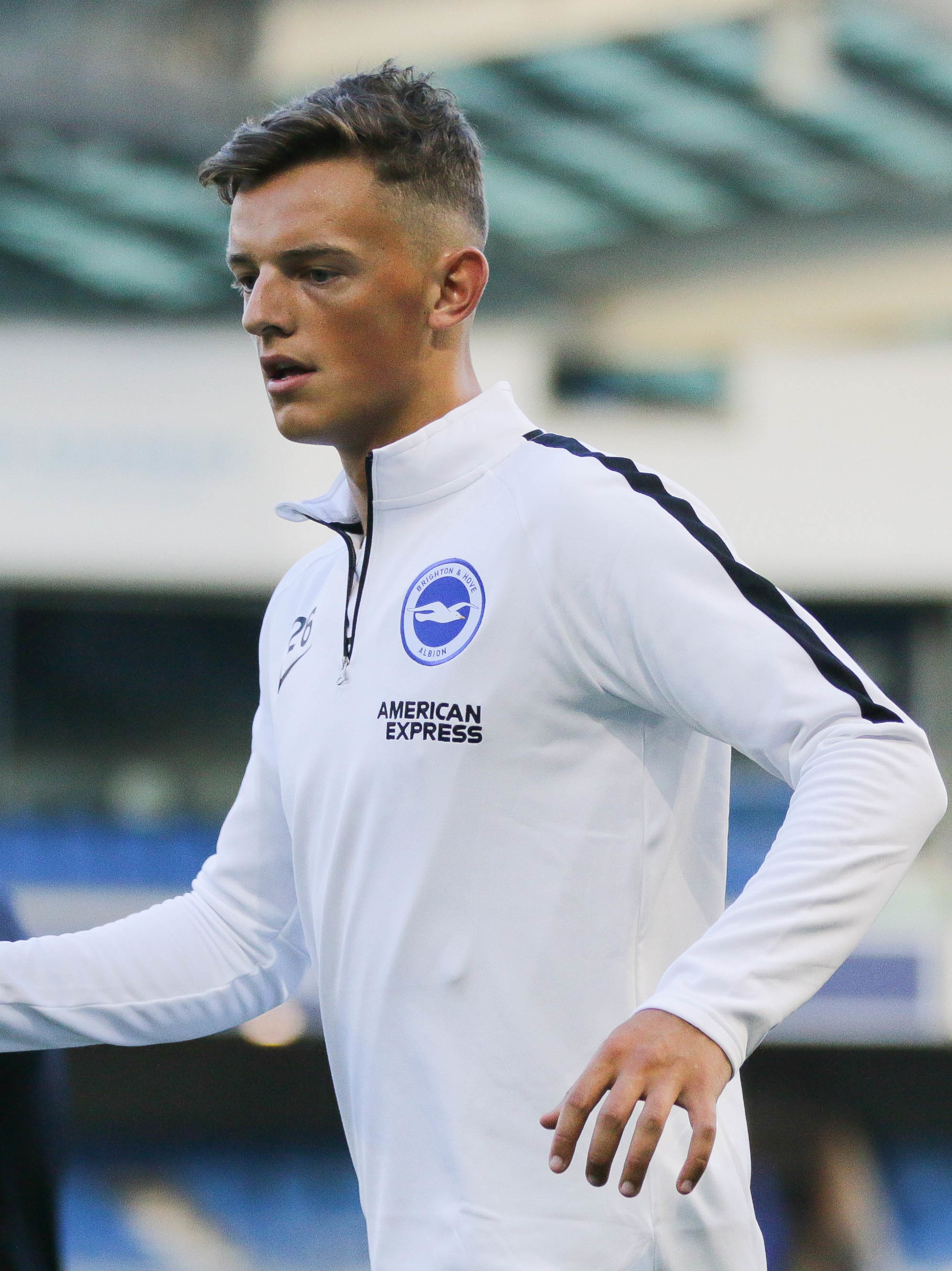
White in 2018

After being linked with a move to Tottenham Hotspur after initially rejecting a new contract offer at Brighton, White did sign a new long-term contract extension at Brighton in April 2018. At the start of the 2018–19 season, then-Brighton manager Chris Hughton stated that White would be the club's fourth-choice centre-back behind Lewis Dunk, Shane Duffy and Leon Balogun. White however was a regular for Brighton U23s. On 26 November 2018, he set up three goals in the Premier League 2 Division 1 to help Brighton U23s to come from 2–0 down to win 3–2 against Swansea City U23s. White made the bench for the Premier League for the first time on 8 December 2018, where Brighton lost 1–0 away to Burnley. White remained an unused substitute.

On 3 January 2019, White signed for League One club Peterborough United on loan until the end of the season. He made his debut for Peterborough on 5 January 2019 in a 5–0 away loss to Middlesbrough in the third round of the FA Cup. White's first match at the London Road Stadium was also his first League One appearance where he came on in the 88th minute to replace Joe Ward in a 2–1 victory over Rochdale on 12 January.

White scored his first goal for Peterborough – and first in League One – scoring the second goal in a 2–0 home win over Southend United on 23 March 2019. White played in the final game of the season which Peterborough won 3–1 at home to Burton Albion. However, with Doncaster Rovers winning their match, Peterborough missed out on a play-off spot. White finished his loan spell making 16 appearances in all competitions, scoring once.

==== 2019–20 season: Loan to Leeds United ====
On 1 July 2019, White signed for Championship club Leeds United on loan until the end of the season. White signed a new one-year contract extension at Brighton on the same day. He was given the number 5 shirt ahead of the 2019–20 season, and made his debut on 4 August in Leeds' opening day 3–1 victory against Bristol City.

On 4 September 2019, after impressive performances during August, White won the Championship PFA Player of the Month award for August 2019. In November 2019, it was reported that White was being scouted by Premier League club Liverpool, with Brighton head coach Graham Potter advising that White wouldn't be recalled from Leeds and that his future would be at Brighton at the end of his loan spell.

On 23 December 2019, after continuing his form, White won the Championship Best Young Player award, as voted by Sky Sports readers. White was watched by England manager Gareth Southgate in January 2020, with Southgate also scouting White's team-mate Kalvin Phillips.

White played in all 46 league games (and all 49 overall) as Leeds were promoted to the Premier League as league champions. He scored his only goal for Leeds in the last game of his loan spell in a 4–0 victory against Charlton Athletic, which was ultimately voted Goal of the Month for July 2020. Following the conclusion of his loan, White won the Leeds Young Player of the season award and the Yorkshire Evening Post award for Player of the season for 2019–20.

On 8 September 2020, White was named in the PFA Team of the Year for the 2019–20 Championship.

==== 2020–21 season: First-team breakthrough ====
Following months of speculation regarding his future, including Brighton rejecting three permanent bids for White from Leeds, White signed a new four-year contract with Brighton on 1 September 2020. On the opening day of the 2020–21 season, White made his league debut for Brighton, in what was also his Premier League debut, in a 3–1 home loss against Chelsea where he went off injured. He helped Brighton keep a clean sheet in their next league match, a 3–0 away win at Newcastle on 20 September. White played in Brighton's FA Cup third round penalty shoot-out victory over his former club Newport on 10 January 2021.

White played in Brighton's 1–0 away victory over defending champions Liverpool on 3 February claiming their first league win at Anfield since 1982. On 20 April, after a strong performance, White was sent off after a second bookable offence in the 90+2-minute, in a game where he helped Brighton earn their first ever point at Chelsea in a 0–0 draw. He played in Brighton's 3–2 home victory over champions Manchester City after coming back from 2–0 down on 18 May, with fans returning to football. This was their first league victory against City since 1989. After a strong season breaking into the first team White picked up the Player Of The Season award on 6 June, on the same day as his first England start.

=== Arsenal ===
On 30 July 2021, White signed for Premier League club Arsenal for £50 million. He made his debut on 13 August, in the opening game of the 2021–22 Premier League season, starting and playing the whole of the 2–0 defeat at Premier League newcomers Brentford. White missed Arsenal's next match on 22 August, a home fixture against London rivals Chelsea, due to a positive COVID-19 test. He eventually made his home debut at the Emirates Stadium after returning on 11 September, helping keep a clean sheet in a 1–0 victory over Norwich City for the club's first league win of the season.

White played in his first North London derby against Tottenham Hotspur on 26 September, he played the whole match where Arsenal took all three points in the 3–1 home victory. On 2 October, White made his first return to Falmer Stadium since leaving Brighton where he started and played the full match for Arsenal in the 0–0 draw with his former club.

During the 2022–23 season, White saw his position being moved to right-back, changing from his usual position at centre-back from the previous season. On 4 March 2023, he scored his first goal for the club in a 3–2 home win over Bournemouth, scoring a volley in the 70th minute.

On 30 September 2023, he scored his first goal of the 2023–24 season in a 4–0 away win against Bournemouth. On 14 March 2024, White signed a new four-year contract with Arsenal until June 2028. Later that season, White scored his first ever brace in a 5–0 derby victory against Chelsea on 23 April 2024.

White underwent minor knee surgery in mid-November 2024 in a procedure that manager Mikel Arteta later said would keep him out of the first team "for months." He made his first-team return on 22 February 2025 against West Ham United.

On 10 May 2026, White sustained a knee injury during a 1–0 away victory over West Ham United, which forced him to miss the remainder of the season, including Premier League title-deciding matches and the UEFA Champions League final, and he was subsequently ruled out of the 2026 FIFA World Cup.

White made his 200th appearance for Arsenal on 24 October 2026, in the Gunners' 2–0 home win against Everton. He marked the occasion by providing the assist for the second goal, scored by Gabriel Magalhães, who himself was making his 200th Premier League appearance.

== International career ==
On 25 May 2021, White was named in England's provisional 33-man squad for UEFA Euro 2020, with the tournament taking place in the summer of 2021 due to the previous year's postponement as a result of the COVID-19 pandemic. This was White's first ever call-up to the national team at any level. He was one of seven players cut from the squad on 1 June, although the players who were cut remained in the squad for the two warm up games against Austria and Romania. White made his England debut coming on as a substitute, replacing Jack Grealish in the 1–0 victory over Austria at the Riverside Stadium on 2 June. He cleared a shot from Alessandro Schöpf off the line, preventing a late equaliser. He became the fifth Brighton player to play for England, and the second in just under three years after Albion teammate and captain Lewis Dunk was capped in November 2018. White made his first start in the second and final warm up match on 6 June, playing the whole match in the 1–0 victory over Romania, again played at the Riverside Stadium.

On 7 June 2021, White was named in the 26-man squad for Euro 2020 as a replacement for the injured Trent Alexander-Arnold. White remained unused in the tournament where England finished as runners-up in the Championships.

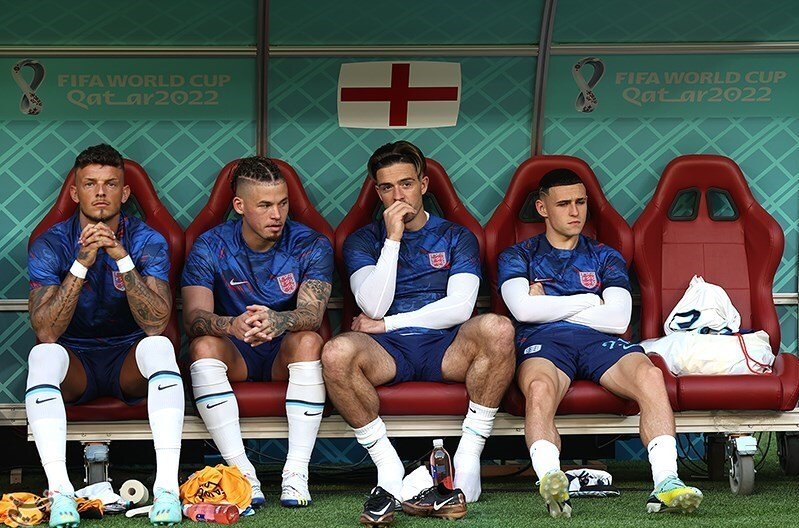
White (left) on the bench for England during the 2022 FIFA World Cup in Qatar

On 10 November 2022, White was named in England's 26-man squad for the 2022 FIFA World Cup. He left the tournament for "personal reasons" on 30 November, the day after the team's final Group B match.

On 14 March 2024, England manager Gareth Southgate said that White had informed England that he did not want to be considered for selection for the national set up. Southgate denied that personal issues between himself and White or between White and England coach Steve Holland, which had been the subject of press speculation, were a factor in White's decision. Southgate said the "door was wide open" for him to return. He added: "[White] would be in this squad but he's not available to us and I have to focus on who can help us. It was later reported that White's self-imposed exile from the England team started with a 'barbed comment' from Southgate's assistant Holland in front of other members of the squad at the World Cup in Qatar in November 2022.

In March 2026, White was called up by England for the first time since 2022, for two friendlies featuring players on the fringe for inclusion in the 2026 FIFA World Cup. In a 1–1 draw against Uruguay on 27 March, White was subbed on in the 68th minute, scored the opener in the 81st, and gave away the equalising penalty in stoppage time. His introduction was marked by boos from fans resentful of his 2022 withdrawal.

== Style of play ==
White has been praised by former manager Michael Flynn for his tough tackling style. White can also play as a defensive midfielder. White describes his own style as a "cool" and "calm" player. White is also known for his surging forward runs with the ball helping create quick counterattacks from deep. Arsenal manager Mikel Arteta described White as "brave", "really talented" and a "fighter", adding: "He trains like he's playing the Champions League final. That's why he's come a long way in such a short time in his career."

== Personal life ==
In May 2023, White married Milly Adams in a private ceremony in London. On 5 June 2025, their first child, a son, was born.

== Career statistics ==
=== Club ===
As of match played 4 November 2026

Appearances and goals by club, season and competition
Club	Season	League			FA Cup		EFL Cup		Europe		Other		Total	
Club	Season	Division	Apps	Goals	Apps	Goals	Apps	Goals	Apps	Goals	Apps	Goals	Apps	Goals
Brighton & Hove Albion U23/21	2016–17	—			—		—		—		3 (Note: Appearances in EFL Trophy)	0	3	0
Brighton & Hove Albion U23/21	2018–19	—			—		—		—		3	0	3	0
Brighton & Hove Albion U23/21	Total		—		—		—		—		6	0	6	0
Brighton & Hove Albion	2016–17	Championship	0	0	0	0	2	0	—		—		2	0
Brighton & Hove Albion	2018–19	Premier League	0	0	—		0	0	—		—		0	0
Brighton & Hove Albion	2020–21	Premier League	36	0	2	0	1	0	—		—		39	0
Brighton & Hove Albion	Total		36	0	2	0	3	0	—		—		41	0
Newport County (loan)	2017–18	League Two	42	1	5	0	2	0	—		2	0	51	1
Peterborough United (loan)	2018–19	League One	15	1	1	0	—		—		—		16	1
Leeds United (loan)	2019–20	Championship	46	1	1	0	2	0	—		—		49	1
Arsenal	2021–22	Premier League	32	0	1	0	4	0	—		—		37	0
Arsenal	2022–23	Premier League	38	2	1	0	0	0	7 (Note: Appearances in UEFA Europa League)	0	—		46	2
Arsenal	2023–24	Premier League	37	4	1	0	2	0	10 (Note: Appearances in UEFA Champions League)	0	1 (Note: Appearance in FA Community Shield)	0	51	4
Arsenal	2024–25	Premier League	17	0	0	0	0	0	9	0	—		26	0
Arsenal	2025–26	Premier League	12	0	3	0	4	1	11	0	—		30	1
Arsenal	2026–27	Premier League	7	0	0	0	1	0	3	0	1	0	12	0
Arsenal	Total		143	6	6	0	11	1	40	0	2	0	202	7
Career total			291	9	15	0	18	1	40	0	10	0	365	10

=== International ===
As of match played 15 November 2026

Appearances and goals by national team and year
National team	Year	Apps	Goals
England	2021	2	0
England	2022	2	0
England	2023	0	0
England	2024	0	0
England	2025	0	0
England	2026	4	2
Total		8	2

Scores and results list England's goal tally first, score column indicates score after each White goal.

List of international goals scored by Ben White
No.	Date	Venue	Cap	Opponent	Score	Result	Competition
1	27 March 2026	Wembley Stadium, London, England	5	Uruguay	1–0	1–1	Friendly
2	15 November 2026	Metropolitano Stadium, Madrid, Spain	8	Spain	3–0	3–2	2026–27 UEFA Nations League A

== Honours ==
Leeds United

- EFL Championship: 2019–20

Arsenal

- Premier League: 2025–26
- FA Community Shield: 2023, 2026
- EFL Cup runner-up: 2025–26
- UEFA Champions League runner-up: 2025–26

England

- UEFA European Championship runner-up: 2020

Individual

- Newport County Player of the Year Award: 2017–18
- Leeds United Young Player of the Season: 2019–20
- PFA Team of the Year: 2019–20 Championship
- Brighton & Hove Albion Player of the Season: 2020–21
- Premier League Fan Team of the Season: 2023–24
- The Athletic Premier League Team of the Season: 2023–24
