= Ray Middleton (footballer) =

English footballer & manager (1919–1977)

Personal information
- Date of birth: 6 September 1919
- Place of birth: The Boldons, England
- Date of death: 1977 (aged 57–58)
- Position: Goalkeeper

Youth career
- North Shields

Senior career*
Years	Team	Apps	(Gls)
1938–1951	Chesterfield	250	(0)
1951–1954	Derby County	116	(0)
1954–1957	Boston United		
Total		366	(0)

International career
1950	England B	4	(0)

Managerial career
- 1954–1957: Boston United (player-manager)
- 1957–1959: Hartlepools United
- 1960–1961: Boston United
- * Club domestic league appearances and goals

Ray Middleton (6 September 1919 – 1977) was an English football goalkeeper and manager, and brother of Matt Middleton.

Born in Boldon Colliery Middleton began his career at North Shields where he attracted the attentions of Chesterfield who signed him for £50. He established himself as first choice keeper but saw his career interrupted by World War II, remaining in the area to work as a miner during the conflict. Highly rated as a player despite not playing top-flight football, he appeared four times for England B and, unusually given their Second Division status, played alongside clubmate Stanley Milburn in one fixture. Off the pitch Middleton ran a grocer shop in Old Whittington and became involved in local Labour Party politics, even becoming the only active Football League player to serve as a Justice of the Peace.

The Spireites' relegation in 1951 saw him leave the club to move to top-flight Derby County, where he made 115 appearances. Released by the club in 1954 he moved to non-league Boston United as a player-manager, even leading the club to a famous 6–1 win over Derby in the FA Cup.

He attracted the attention of Hartlepools United who appointed him as their manager in 1957. He began promisingly with a 2–1 win over Accrington Stanley although his record proved mediocre and after a 5–1 defeat at Doncaster Rovers in October 1959 he left the club.

Middleton returned to Boston, initially for a spell as manager before taking up the post of secretary. He held this position until his death in 1977.
