= Paul Raynor =

English footballer

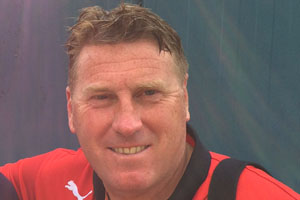
- Raynor in 2014

Personal information
- Full name: Paul James Raynor
- Date of birth: 29 April 1966 (age 60)
- Place of birth: Nottingham, England
- Height: 6 ft 0 in (1.83 m)
- Position: Midfielder

Team information
- Current team: Bristol Rovers (assistant head coach)

Youth career
- Nottingham Forest

Senior career*
Years	Team	Apps	(Gls)
1984–1985	Nottingham Forest	3	(1)
1984	→ Bristol Rovers (loan)	8	(0)
1985–1987	Huddersfield Town	50	(9)
1987–1992	Swansea City	191	(27)
1988	→ Wrexham (loan)	6	(0)
1992–1993	Cambridge United	49	(2)
1993–1995	Preston North End	80	(9)
1995–1997	Cambridge United	79	(7)
1997	Guangdong Hongyuan	10	(1)
1998	Leyton Orient	15	(0)
1998–1999	Kettering Town		
1999–2000	Ilkeston Town		
2000–2001	Boston United		
2001	King's Lynn	5	(0)
2001	Hednesford Town	11	(0)
2001	Gainsborough Trinity		
2002	Ossett Albion		
2002–2004	King's Lynn	68	(1)
2007–2009	Crawley Town	4	(1)

Managerial career
- 2001: Hednesford Town
- 2004–2006: Boston United (assistant manager)
- 2006–2007: Boston United
- 2007–2012: Crawley Town (assistant manager)
- 2012–2015: Rotherham United (assistant manager)
- 2015–2016: Leeds United (assistant head coach)
- 2016–2018: Mansfield Town (assistant head coach)
- 2018–2019: Peterborough United (assistant manager)
- 2019–2022: Gillingham (assistant manager)
- 2022–2024: Stevenage (assistant manager)
- 2024–2025: Rotherham United (assistant manager)
- 2025–: Bristol Rovers (assistant head coach)
- * Club domestic league appearances and goals

Paul James Raynor (born 29 April 1966) is an English former professional footballer who played as a midfielder. He has worked as assistant manager under Steve Evans at Rotherham United, Leeds United, Mansfield Town, Peterborough United, Gillingham and Stevenage. He is currently assistant head coach at Bristol Rovers.

== Career ==
He played in the Football League for Nottingham Forest, Bristol Rovers, Huddersfield Town, Swansea City, Wrexham, Cambridge United, Preston North End (where he briefly played alongside a young David Beckham), and Leyton Orient. He also spent a year in the Chinese Jia-A League with Guangdong Hongyuan.

After leaving Leyton Orient, Raynor moved into non-League football with clubs including Kettering Town, Ilkeston Town, Boston United, King's Lynn, Hednesford Town, where he spent a few months as player-manager, Gainsborough Trinity, Ossett Albion, and then King's Lynn again, to be released at the end of the 2002–03 season, only to rejoin for the next.

== Coaching career ==
Raynor has coached at clubs Sheffield United and Boston United, where he was assistant manager for a time to Steve Evans. In May 2007 Evans and Raynor left Boston to take over as manager and assistant at Crawley Town, where he occasionally appeared as a player in the Conference. The pair subsequently moved to Rotherham United. On 28 September 2015, Raynor left Rotherham. On 19 October 2015, Raynor joined fellow Championship side Leeds United, once again as assistant to Evans. On 31 May 2016, Evans and Raynor were both sacked by Leeds owner Massimo Cellino, with Evans becoming the sixth manager sacked by Cellino in two years.

In June 2019 Raynor linked up with Evans once again at Gillingham. Both departed the club on 9 January 2022.

In December 2025, Raynor followed Evans to League Two club Bristol Rovers as assistant head coach on a short-term deal until the end of the season. Having guided the club to safety, the duo signed a new two-year deal in April 2026.

== Personal life ==
On 1 October 2026, Raynor revealed that he had been diagnosed with bowel cancer and that he would undergo chemotherapy and radiotherapy, starting later in the month.

== Honours ==
Swansea City

- Football League Fourth Division play-offs: 1988
