= Steve Evans (footballer, born 1962) =

Scottish football manager (born 1962)

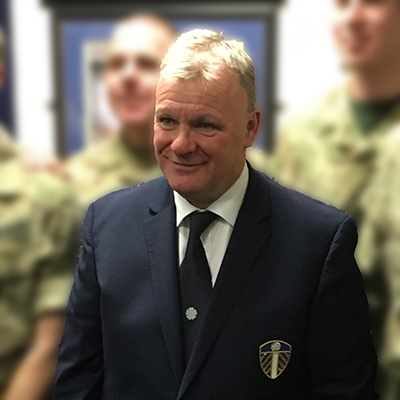
- Evans in 2016

Personal information
- Full name: Stephen James Evans
- Date of birth: 30 October 1962 (age 64)
- Place of birth: Glasgow, Scotland
- Position: Striker

Team information
- Current team: Bristol Rovers (manager)

Youth career
- ?–1979: Bolton Wanderers

Senior career*
Years	Team	Apps	(Gls)
1979–1981	Clyde	36	(4)
1981–1984	Albion Rovers	76	(28)
1984–1985	Ayr United	30	(4)
1985	Hamilton Academical	2	(0)
1985–1986	St Johnstone	24	(6)
Total		168	(42)

Managerial career
- 1994–1998: Stamford
- 1998–2002: Boston United
- 2004–2007: Boston United
- 2007–2012: Crawley Town
- 2012–2015: Rotherham United
- 2015–2016: Leeds United
- 2016–2018: Mansfield Town
- 2018–2019: Peterborough United
- 2019–2022: Gillingham
- 2022–2024: Stevenage
- 2024–2025: Rotherham United
- 2025–: Bristol Rovers
- * Club domestic league appearances and goals

Stephen James Evans (born 30 October 1962) is a Scottish professional football manager and former player who is the manager of EFL League Two club Bristol Rovers.

Born in Glasgow, Scotland, Evans played professional football for Bolton Wanderers, Clyde, Albion Rovers, Ayr United, Hamilton Academical and St Johnstone until a knee ligament injury ended his playing career at 24.

After his retirement, he became a manager. Prior to taking charge at Crawley Town, he managed Stamford and Boston United, the latter on two occasions.

A controversial figure, whilst manager of Boston United he was successfully prosecuted for tax evasion. However, in charge of Rotherham United, he led the club to two successive promotions. He left the club in late September 2015. On 19 October 2015, Evans replaced Uwe Rösler as head coach of Leeds United, before being sacked in May 2016.

== Early life ==
Born in Glasgow, Scotland, Evans was spotted by scouts from English team Bolton Wanderers when playing for his local youth football club in Glasgow, and he joined Bolton after leaving school.

== Playing career ==
Evans failed to break into the first team at Bolton and was released in 1979. He then returned to his native Scotland and joined Clyde, where he played in 36 league matches, scoring four goals, before joining Albion Rovers in 1981, where he scored 28 goals in 76 league matches during three years at Cliftonhill. He subsequently moved to Ayr United in 1984, scoring four goals in 30 matches, and to Hamilton Academical in 1985, where he played in two league matches. He joined St Johnstone in 1985 and scored six goals in 24 matches before a knee ligament injury the following year ended his playing career, aged 24.

== Managerial career ==
=== Stamford ===
Evans fell out of football following his retirement, and was working in sales for Budweiser, when he became manager at Peterborough League side Gedney Hill. He soon moved to Holbeach United for eighteen months, before briefly becoming chairman at Corby Town. His managerial career got going in earnest with Stamford in 1994, who he led to the United Counties Football League Premier Division title and to promotion to the Southern Football League.

=== Boston United ===
After resigning as Stamford manager he was appointed manager of Boston United in October 1998. He managed Boston to promotion from the Southern Football League to the Football Conference in 2000 and subsequently to the Football League in 2002. Both promotions have since been overshadowed by revelations of off-the-field cheating.

Evans was suspended by Boston as manager on 4 July 2002 after a much-publicised Football Association (The FA) investigation into "contract irregularities". He later resigned as manager of the club in September 2002, after still being suspended by the club. He was found guilty by The FA in December 2002 of impeding an FA inquiry into contract irregularities. Evans was also suspended from the game for 20 months in January 2003 for involvement of the affairs of Boston, in which players' contracts lodged with the FA contained false salary details. Evans was further accused of impeding the inquiry and fined £8,000. Evans lodged an appeal against charges in May 2003, but The FA rejected his appeal later that month and the punishment stood. Evans later pleaded guilty in court to conspiring to cheat the public revenue, and was given a 12-month prison sentence, suspended for two years.

An announcement was made on 20 February 2004 that Evans would return as Boston's manager on 2 March. In September 2005, Evans and four other people connected with Boston appeared in court, denying fraud charges. In November 2005, Evans was given a £1,000 fine, suspended for a year, after admitting to using insulting or abusive words to the match official in a match against Peterborough United in October 2005. On 11 February 2006, he was escorted from Grimsby Town's stadium Blundell Park by Humberside Police at half-time, after he berated the fourth official after being incensed when Grimsby goalkeeper Steve Mildenhall appeared to handle the ball outside his area and was immediately spoken to by a police officer after a complaint of alleged foul and abusive language. After the match Boston chairman Jon Sotnick accused the football authorities of waging a "conspiracy" against his manager. In October 2006, Evans was linked with the vacant Darlington managerial vacancy, but Boston chairman James Rodwell and Evans both denied the link. Also in October, Evans was sent from the dugout after an altercation with Wycombe Wanderers player Tommy Doherty for which he later received a £1,000 suspended fine from the FA. Despite this, which came on top of his conviction for tax evasion, Evans kept his manager's position at Boston, a decision that angered the Boston United Supporters' Trust.

In March 2007, Evans was left with only 11 professional footballers for the relegation clash with Bury. Although players were back from suspension, Evans was left frustrated after players such as Barnsley's on-loan striker Nathan Joynes quit the club, which left him with just 12 fit senior players and he was forced to put 16- and 17-year-olds on an incomplete substitute's bench. After drawing 1–1 in their penultimate match of the season against relegated Torquay United, Boston needed a win against relegation rivals Wrexham on 5 May 2007 to avoid the drop out of league football.

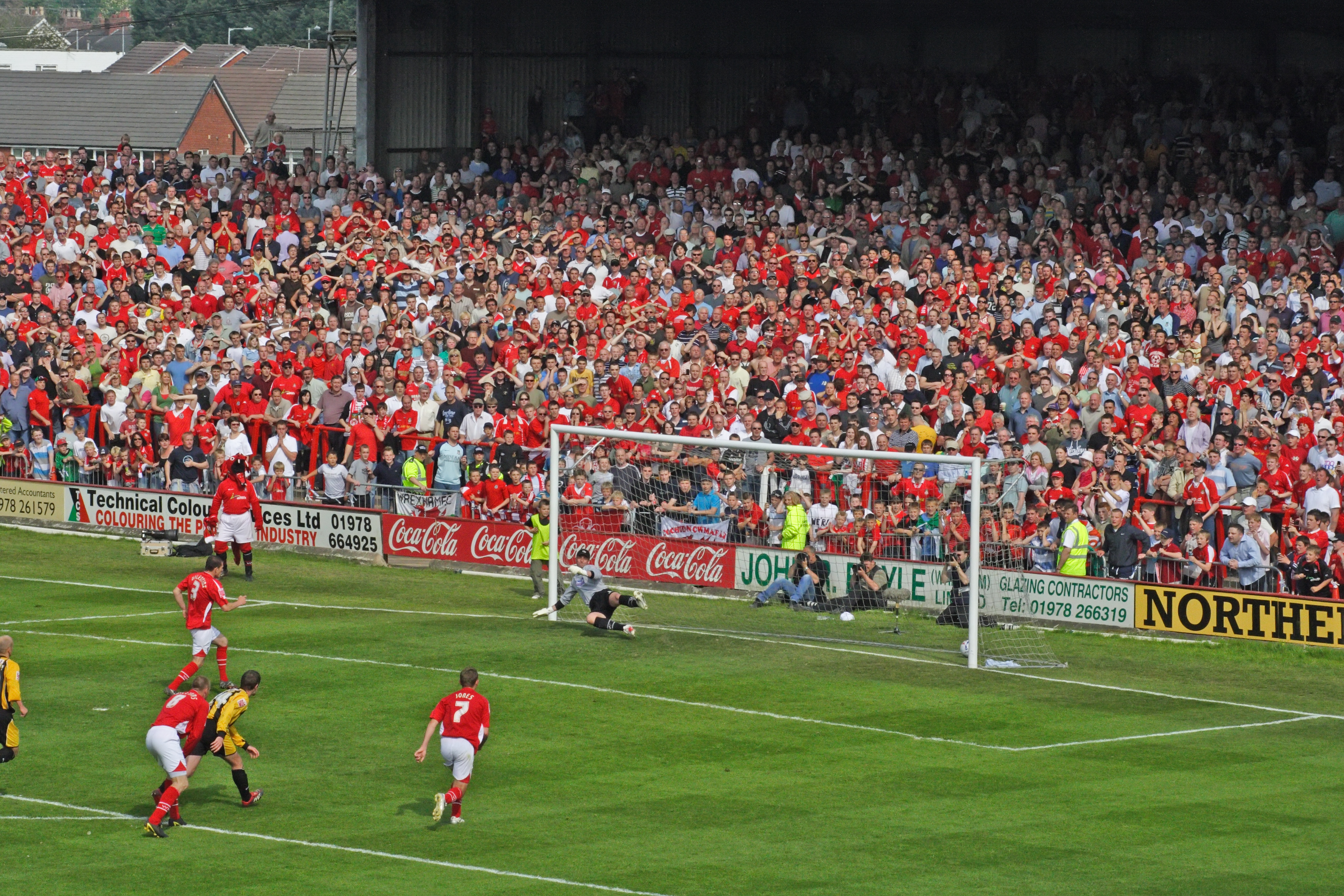
Wrexham defender Ryan Valentine scores the penalty kick against Boston United that relegated Evans's team

Francis Green gave Boston a 1–0 half-time lead, but in the second half United conceded a penalty kick, which Wrexham defender Ryan Valentine converted. Two late goals from Chris Llewellyn and Michael Proctor gave Wrexham a 3–1 victory to ensure their survival. On 8 May 2007, Evans pledged his commitment to the club despite their relegation and return to non-League football. However, on 27 May, Evans and his assistant manager Paul Raynor resigned from Boston with immediate effect. Evans's two occasions as manager combined at Boston made him the club's second-longest-serving manager behind Fred Tunstall, who had three occasions as manager of the club in the 1930s, 40s and 50s. He managed the team on 354 occasions, which resulted in 145 wins, 99 draws and 110 losses.

=== Crawley Town ===
On 29 May 2007, two days after resigning from Boston, Evans took over as Crawley Town manager. He was sent from the dugout numerous times, which resulted in a ten match ban during the 2008–09 season. He verbally accepted a new three-year contract with Crawley in February 2011. During the 2010–11 season, Crawley reached the fifth round of the FA Cup, beating Swindon Town of League One, Derby County of the Championship and Torquay United of League Two. In the fifth round they were drawn against Manchester United at Old Trafford. Crawley lost this match 1–0 but earned over £1 million for this match alone. Evans stated afterwards "I think we have done our football club proud and we wanted to go away with some respect" and "We have had a fantastic run in the competition and we could not have wished it to finish anywhere else". On 9 April 2011 Crawley clinched promotion to Football League Two for the 2011–12 season. Evans and striker Tyrone Barnett were nominated for League Two Player of the Month and Manager of the Month for August but lost out to Andy Scott and Mark Arber respectively. Despite this, Evans was named October Manager of the Month after achieving five wins, including a 5–2 away victory at AFC Wimbledon, strengthening their push for a second consecutive promotion.

=== Rotherham United ===
Evans left Crawley on 9 April 2012 to be appointed manager of fellow League Two club Rotherham United on a three-year contract. In September 2012, Evans was given a six-match stadium ban and fined £3,000 by the Football Association after being found guilty of "using abusive and insulting words and behaviour" towards a female member of Bradford City's staff, an incident which occurred during his time at Crawley.

In his first full season at the club, Rotherham showed inconsistent form throughout, but a run of 5 wins in their last 5 games saw them elevate into the automatic promotion places, finishing second behind champions Gillingham, after a 2–0 win over Aldershot Town saw Rotherham promoted on the final day. Starting the following season in League One, Evans continued to produce good results, an honorable mention being the 6–0 win at home against Notts County. Rotherham were promoted later that season in May 2014, drawing the play-off final 2–2 over 120 minutes, and subsequently beating Leyton Orient 4–3 in a penalty shootout.

On 29 May 2014, Evans agreed a new three-year contract with Rotherham, live on Sky Sports News, a deal which would commit him to the club until 2017. Under his management Rotherham survived their first season back in the Championship, with a game to spare. Evans wore a sombrero, shorts and sandals to the fixture against Leeds United at Elland Road on the final day of the season by way of a celebration.

On 28 September 2015, Evans and his assistant manager Paul Raynor left Rotherham with the club citing that the two parties wanted to take the club in different directions. He was replaced as manager on 9 October by former Leeds Head Coach Neil Redfearn.

=== Leeds United ===
On 19 October 2015, Evans joined fellow Championship side Leeds United on a rolling contract until the end of the 2015–16 season, with the option of a second year, replacing previous head coach Uwe Rösler. Evans's assistant at Rotherham, Paul Raynor, also joined him as part of the coaching staff.

Evans took charge of a Leeds side one point off the relegation zone, however, he managed to guide Leeds to a 13th-place finish at the end of the 2015–16 season with Leeds finishing 15 points behind the playoff positions. He also gave debuts to 3 academy graduates during the season with Lewie Coyle, Bailey Peacock-Farrell and Ronaldo Vieira all making their debuts under Evans during his tenure. Evans also helped Leeds have an FA Cup run, however his side were knocked out on 20 February 2016 against Premier League side Watford in a narrow 1–0 defeat after a high-profile own goal from Leeds defender Scott Wootton to send Watford through to the FA Cup quarter-final.

After the final game of the 2015–16 season against Preston North End, a tearful Evans proclaimed that he had a 'gut feeling' that his contract would not be renewed by club owner Massimo Cellino. At the end of the season Cellino approached MK Dons manager Karl Robinson and Bristol Rovers manager Darrell Clarke to replace Evans, but neither accepted. Evans, along with his assistant Paul Raynor, was sacked on 31 May. The following month he accepted personal terms to become manager at League One side Oldham Athletic, but then turned the post down.

=== Mansfield Town ===
Evans was appointed manager of League Two side Mansfield Town on 16 November 2016, replacing Adam Murray. He resigned on 27 February 2018, saying he wanted to go and work in China.

=== Peterborough United ===
Evans was appointed manager of League One side Peterborough United on 28 February 2018, one day after leaving Mansfield. On 23 January 2019 he was charged by the FA over comments made to a match official during a defeat against Luton Town, and then on the 26th both he and assistant Paul Raynor were released from their contracts, with Darren Ferguson taking charge just hours later.

=== Gillingham ===
On 21 May 2019, Evans was announced as the new manager of Gillingham and began his role on 1 June 2019. Evans was awarded the League One Manager of the Month award for March 2021 after achieving 17 points from a possible 24.

In August 2021, Evans started the 2021–22 season by being awarded a yellow card in the first match against Lincoln City, and then a red card in the next game, a EFL Cup fixture against Crawley Town. He was then once again charged with verbally abusing a match official.

On 9 January 2022, following a 4–0 home defeat to Ipswich Town that left the side 22nd in the table, seven points from safety, Evans was sacked by the club.

=== Stevenage ===
Evans was appointed as manager of League Two club Stevenage on 16 March 2022, the club sitting in 22nd position just three points clear of the relegation zone with the team below having two games in hand. Survival was secured with three matches remaining after a run of ten points across Evans's first six matches, culminating in a 2–0 home win over Tranmere Rovers, saw his side move seven points clear of Oldham Athletic who were relegated at Stevenage's expense. Evans's 2022–23 campaign started strongly with 10 victories out of 13 in the League, resulting in Stevenage sitting top of the league on 8 October 2022. In an FA Cup third-round tie at Premier League side Aston Villa, Evans's side came from behind to win 2–1 at Villa Park. A 2–0 win against Grimsby Town, on 29 April 2023, confirmed Stevenage's promotion to League One. On 5 May 2023 Evans was named the League Two Manager of the Month of April after guiding the team through eight games in the month with only one defeat.

Following an impressive first season after promotion that saw Stevenage in a race for the play-offs, Evans was nominated for League One Manager of the Year, ultimately losing out to Portsmouth manager John Mousinho. He left the club in April 2024 having won 57 of his 120 matches with the club.

=== Rotherham United ===
On 17 April 2024, Evans returned to already relegated Championship club Rotherham United on a three-year deal. On 29 March 2025, Evans was sacked following a 4–0 home defeat to Crawley Town with the Millers sitting 16th in EFL League One, nine points clear of the relegation zone.

=== Bristol Rovers ===
On 16 December 2025 Evans was appointed Head Coach of League Two side Bristol Rovers on a deal until the end of the season. In his first match in charge he ended the team's 10-game losing streak with a draw against Crewe Alexandra. Evans was handed a one-match touchline ban on 22 January 2026 after admitting a charge of misconduct for being sent off against Plymouth Argyle in an EFL Trophy game on 13 January. Having turned around the club's fortunes and led the club away from the relegation zone, he entered talks with chairman Hussain AlSaeed to extend his stay with the club in March 2026, also being nominated for League Two Manager of the Month. On 11 April 2026, he signed a permanent two-year deal to remain as manager. The following week, his side defeated Tranmere Rovers to secure a seventh consecutive league victory, the first time the club had achieved this since 1953. Having extended this winning run to eight, he was later named League Two Manager of the Month for April 2026.

== Personal life ==
As of 2004, Evans was married to Sarah-Jane and had two daughters. He is a supporter of Scottish club Celtic.

Following his departure from Rotherham United in 2025, Evans lost six-and-a-half stone, citing the desire to see his grandchildren grow up as the reason behind the dramatic transformation.

== Managerial statistics ==
As of match played 21 November 2026

Managerial record by team and tenure
Team	From	To	Record					Ref.
Team	From	To	P	W	D	L	Win %	Ref.
Boston United	October 1998	4 July 2002	186	92	53	41	49.5	
Boston United	2 March 2004	27 May 2007	168	53	46	69	31.5	
Crawley Town	29 May 2007	9 April 2012	266	128	68	70	48.1	
Rotherham United	9 April 2012	28 September 2015	173	72	45	56	41.6	
Leeds United	19 October 2015	31 May 2016	38	14	12	12	36.8	
Mansfield Town	16 November 2016	27 February 2018	76	35	22	19	46.1	
Peterborough United	28 February 2018	26 January 2019	52	21	15	16	40.4	
Gillingham	1 June 2019	9 January 2022	129	41	41	47	31.8	
Stevenage	16 March 2022	17 April 2024	120	57	33	30	47.5	
Rotherham United	17 April 2024	30 March 2025	50	18	11	21	36.0	
Bristol Rovers	16 December 2025	Present	48	21	6	21	43.8	
Total			1,305	552	351	402	42.3	

== Honours ==
=== As a manager ===
Stamford

- United Counties League Premier Division: 1996–97, 1997–98

Boston United

- Football Conference: 2001–02
- Southern Football League Premier Division: 1999–2000

Crawley Town

- Conference Premier: 2010–11

Rotherham United

- Football League One play-offs: 2014
- Football League Two second-place promotion: 2012–13

Stevenage

- Football League Two second-place promotion: 2022–23

Individual

- Football League/EFL League One Manager of the Month: August 2018, March 2021
- Football League/EFL League Two Manager of the Month: October 2011, April 2023, April 2026

== See also ==
- List of football managers with the most matches
