= Jake Young (footballer) =

English footballer (born 2001)

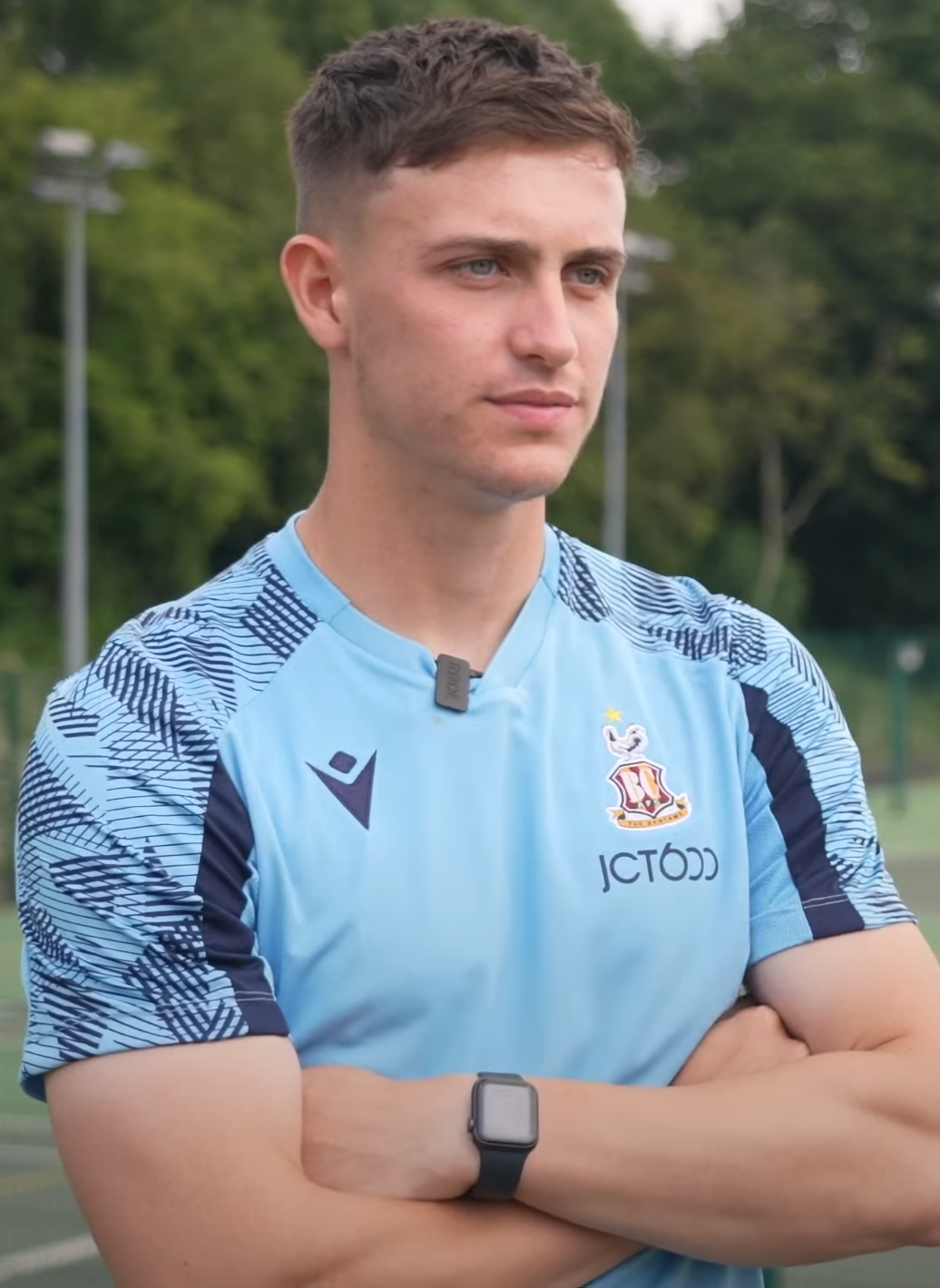
- Young in 2022

Personal information
- Full name: Jake Alan Young
- Date of birth: 22 July 2001 (age 25)
- Place of birth: Huddersfield, England
- Height: 1.86 m (6 ft 1 in)
- Position: Forward

Team information
- Current team: St Mirren
- Number: 20

Youth career
- Shelley Juniors
- 2017–2019: Guiseley
- 2019–2020: Sheffield United

Senior career*
Years	Team	Apps	(Gls)
2020–2022	Forest Green Rovers	51	(9)
2022–2024	Bradford City	11	(2)
2023	→ Barrow (loan)	17	(0)
2023–2024	→ Swindon Town (loan)	25	(16)
2024–2026	Stevenage	35	(4)
2026–	St Mirren	27	(2)
- * Club domestic league appearances and goals as of 08:41, 22 November 2026 (UTC)

Jake Alan Young (born 22 July 2001) is an English professional footballer who plays as a forward for Scottish club St Mirren.

Young joined Sheffield United from Guiseley in 2019, though moved on to Forest Green Rovers in July 2020 without playing a first-team game for Sheffield United. He played over 50 games for Forest Green, helping the club to win the League Two title in the 2021–22 campaign, and signed for Bradford City in July 2022. He spent the second half of the 2022–23 season on loan at Barrow and was loaned out to Swindon Town for the first half of the 2023–24 season. He signed for Stevenage in August 2024.

== Career ==
=== Early career ===
Born in Huddersfield, Young grew up supporting Huddersfield Town. He moved from Shelley Juniors to Guiseley in 2017. He scored six goals in one FA Youth Cup match against Ossett United and was an unused substitute for the first-team in an FA Cup match. He moved to Sheffield United after impressing manager Chris Wilder on trial in January 2019, but was released by the club before he signed for Forest Green Rovers in July 2020.

=== Forest Green Rovers ===
Young scored his first goal for Forest Green Rovers in an EFL Trophy tie against West Bromwich Albion U21s on 6 October 2020. His first league goal came eleven days later, in a 2–0 win over Stevenage at The New Lawn, in which he was also named as man of the match. He scored eight goals in 33 appearances throughout the 2020–21 campaign. Mark Cooper, sacked as manager shortly before the season's end, said that Young possessed "Premier League ability", but needed to contribute more defensively. Young scored four goals in 29 games in the 2021–22 season as Rovers were promoted as champions of League Two under the management of Rob Edwards.

=== Bradford City ===
In May 2022, Young signed for Bradford City for an undisclosed fee on a three-year deal. He said that working with manager Mark Hughes was the main attraction. He scored on his debut for the club, an equalising goal in an eventual 3–2 loss away at Barrow on 6 August 2022. By 8 September, he had scored three goals in the past two games, but said that he aware that a first-team place was not guaranteed due to the size of the squad. His goal against Walsall was nominated for the League Two goal of the month for September. However, by January 2023 he had not played in the League since mid-September, and had only made two EFL Trophy appearances since (both in October), with Hughes saying that there were players ahead of him in the squad.

On 14 January 2023, Young joined League Two side Barrow on loan for the remainder of the 2022–23 season. At the time Barrow manager Pete Wild described Young as a "top player", with Wild later saying that Young was starting to impress him with his performances.

Ahead of the 2023–24 season, Young was told that he could find a new club. In July 2023, Hughes revealed that Young had rejected loan moves away from the club. He missed the club's pre-season trip to Spain, and played with the youth team in a friendly against Bradford (Park Avenue). On 2 August, Young signed for League Two rivals Swindon Town on loan for the 2023–24 season. On 26 August, Young scored four goals against Crawley Town in a 6–0 rout. After three goals early in the season, he was described as an "instant hit" at Swindon, and after scoring seven goals in four games, he was nominated for the League Two August 2023 Player of the Month award, which Young won. He also won the November Player of the Month award. Young said he was playing the best football of his career at Swindon.

In December 2023, new Bradford City manager Graham Alexander suggested that he would recall Young, who was the league's top-scorer, from his loan in January 2024. Young spoke about the difficulty in being frozen out by Hughes. On 2 January 2024, he was recalled by his parent club. Alexander said that Young would feature in his first-teams plans, whilst Swindon manager Michael Flynn was praised for "reviving" Young's career. Young attracted attention from League One clubs in the January transfer window, although a preliminary bid from one club was rejected for being too low, whilst former club Swindon were "priced out" of bidding for the player. Alexander said that Young would be considered for first-team action when he returned from a slight injury which had seen him miss two matches. A second bid for Young was also rejected, with Carlisle United describing the asking price as "ridiculous". Carlisle manager Paul Simpson later apologised for his comments. A third bid was also rejected, whilst Derby County and Charlton Athletic were said to be interested.

Young returned to training in January 2024, whilst Alexander defended himself against criticism from fans about Young. Young returned to bradford's first-team on 27 January 2024, appearing as a substitute in a 2–0 defeat away at former club Swindon. His return was heralded by teammate Alex Gilliead, and assistant manager Chris Lucketti. He then suffered an injury in a match, later undergoing hamstring surgery. He was later ruled out for the rest of the season.

He returned to fitness in May 2024, after the end of the season, and had an "intensive" two weeks at St George's Park in June 2024 ahead of the new 2024–25 season. He later said he had been fighting to return to the first-team under previous manager Mark Hughes, and that he was looking forward to a new start under new manager Graham Alexander. He returned to play in pre-season, with 45 minutes in a friendly against Chorley, although other players had game time ahead of him in later friendlies, as he was subject to transfer speculation.

He was not in Bradford's squad for their first home game of the 2024–25 season. Alexander later said that the transfer speculation was distracting Young. The club accepted a transfer offer from another unnamed club, with Fleetwood Town also being linked with his signing. Alexander said that Young had to decide his future.

=== Stevenage ===
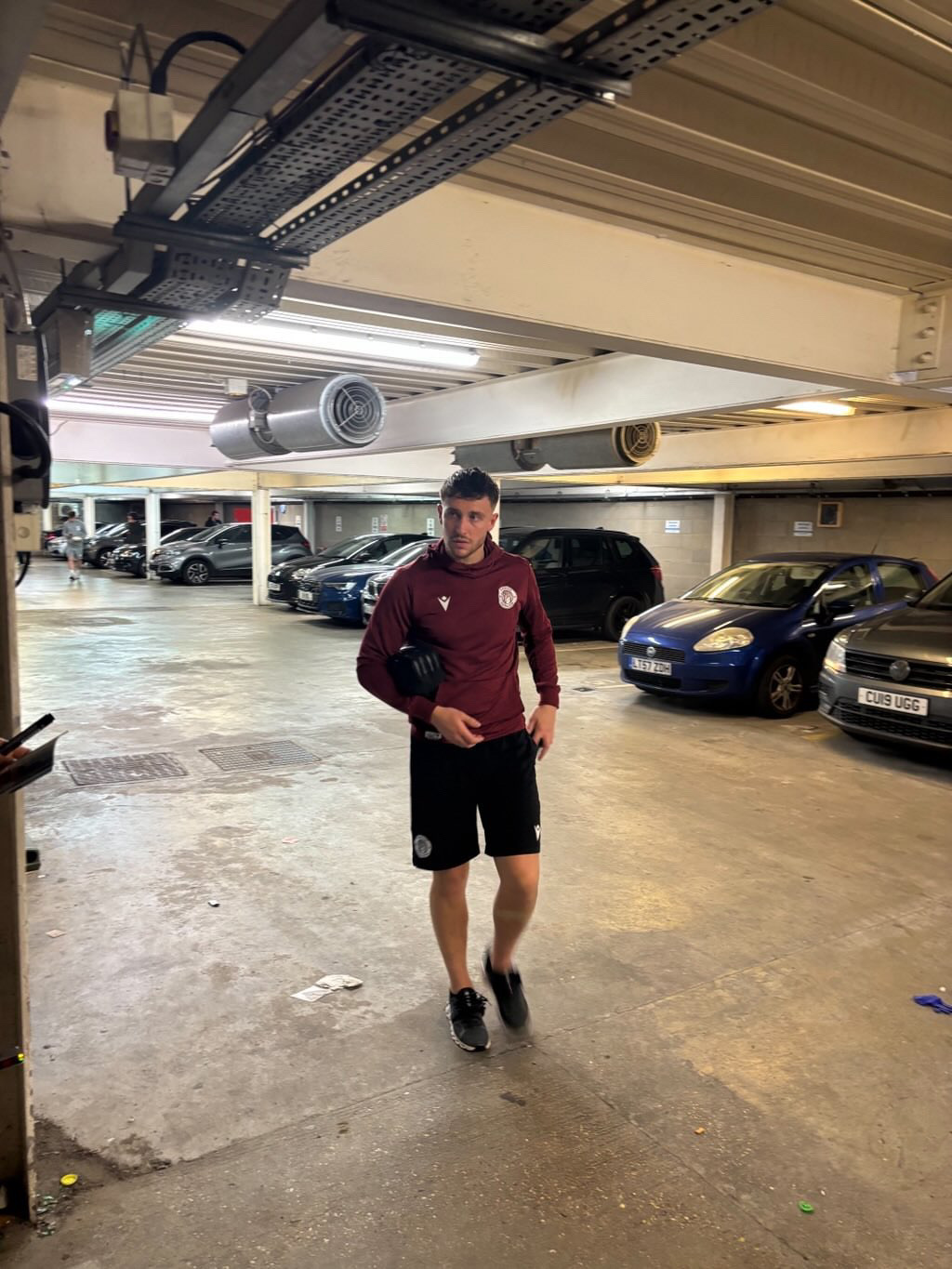
Young in March 2025.

Young signed for Stevenage in August 2024. Bradford City manager Graham Alexander said the transfer was the "right thing" for the club.

Young missed the start of the 2025–26 season due to injury, making his first appearance as a substitute in the EFL Trophy on 21 October 2025.

=== St Mirren ===
In January 2026, Young signed for Scottish Premiership club St Mirren.

== Style of play ==
Young is a forward known for his pace.

== Personal life ==
Young played tennis as a youth, playing in national tournaments, but gave up the sport to pursue a football career.

== Career statistics ==
As of match played 21 November 2026

Appearances and goals by club, season and competition
Club	Season	League			National Cup		League Cup		Other		Total	
Club	Season	Division	Apps	Goals	Apps	Goals	Apps	Goals	Apps	Goals	Apps	Goals
Forest Green Rovers	2020–21	League Two	29	6	1	1	0	0	3 (Note: 2 appearances and 1 goal in the EFL Trophy; 1 appearance in the play-offs.)	1	33	8
Forest Green Rovers	2021–22	League Two	22	3	1	0	2	0	4 (Note: Appearance(s) in EFL Trophy)	1	29	4
Forest Green Rovers	Total		51	9	2	1	2	0	7	2	62	12
Bradford City	2022–23	League Two	7	2	0	0	2	0	3	2	12	4
Bradford City	2023–24	League Two	4	0	0	0	0	0	1	0	5	0
Bradford City	2024–25	League Two	0	0	0	0	1	0	0	0	1	0
Bradford City	Total		11	2	0	0	3	0	4	2	18	4
Barrow (loan)	2022–23	League Two	17	0	0	0	0	0	0	0	17	0
Swindon Town (loan)	2023–24	League Two	25	16	0	0	1	0	0	0	26	16
Stevenage	2024–25	League One	29	4	2	0	0	0	5	0	36	4
Stevenage	2025–26	League One	6	0	0	0	0	0	2	0	8	0
Stevenage	Total		35	4	2	0	0	0	7	0	44	4
St Mirren	2025–26	Scottish Premiership	13	2	3	1	0	0	1 (Note: Appearance in the relegation play-offs)	0	17	3
St Mirren	2026–27	Scottish Premiership	14	0	0	0	1	0	0	0	15	0
St Mirren	Total		27	2	3	1	1	0	1	0	32	3
Career total			166	33	7	2	7	0	19	4	199	39

== Honours ==
Forest Green Rovers

- EFL League Two: 2021–22

Individual

- EFL League Two Player of the Month: August 2023, November 2023
