= Jack Aitchison =

Scottish footballer (born 2000)

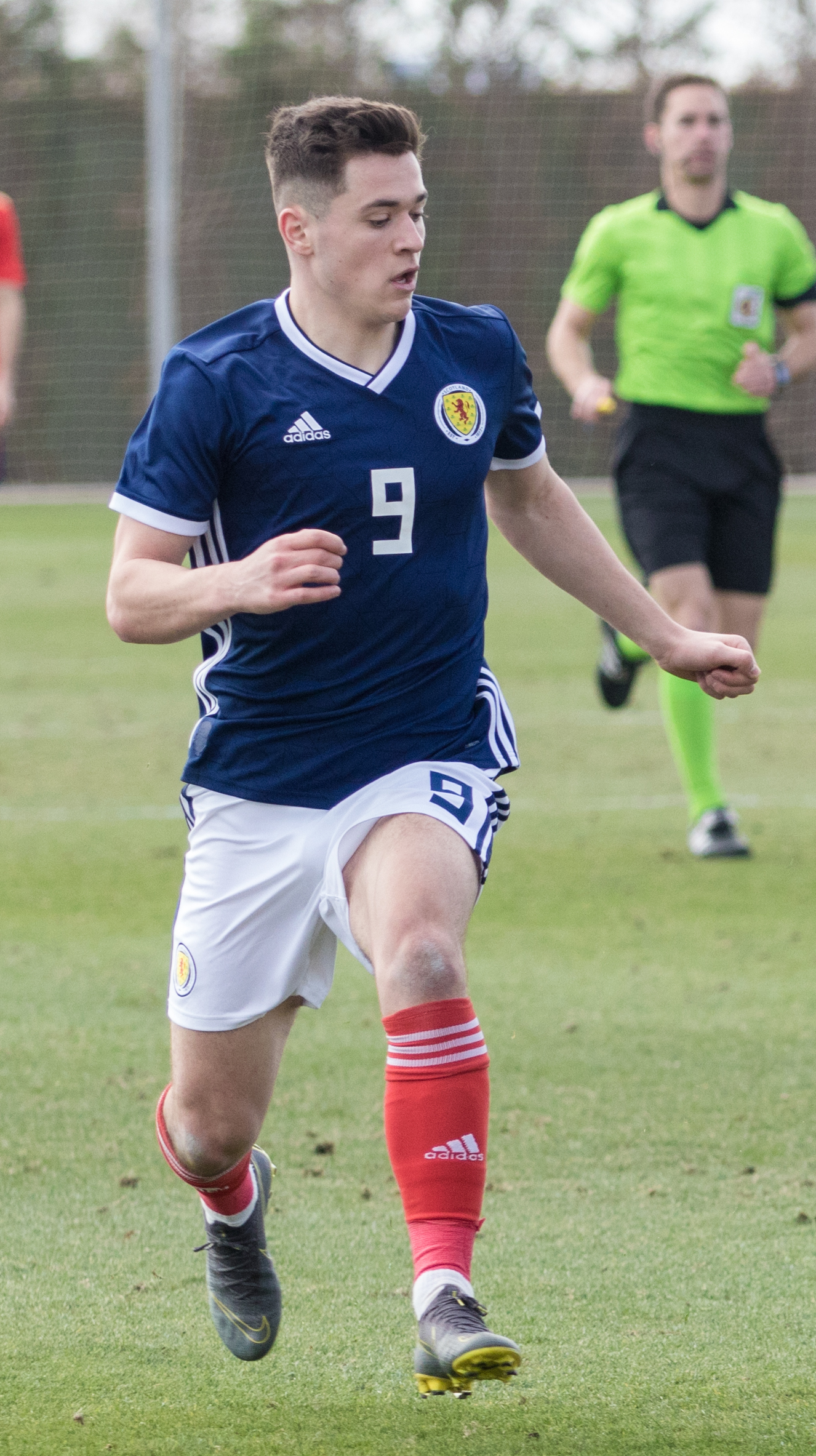
- Aitchison with Scotland U19 in 2019

Personal information
- Full name: Jack Aitchison
- Date of birth: 5 March 2000 (age 26)
- Place of birth: Fauldhouse, Scotland
- Height: 1.80 m (5 ft 11 in)
- Positions: Forward; attacking midfielder

Team information
- Current team: Bristol Rovers
- Number: 11

Youth career
- 2010–2016: Celtic

Senior career*
Years	Team	Apps	(Gls)
2016–2020	Celtic	3	(1)
2018	→ Dumbarton (loan)	4	(0)
2019	→ Alloa Athletic (loan)	10	(1)
2019–2020	→ Forest Green Rovers (loan)	28	(5)
2020–2023	Barnsley	20	(3)
2020–2021	→ Stevenage (loan)	26	(1)
2021–2022	→ Forest Green Rovers (loan)	46	(5)
2023	Motherwell	10	(0)
2023–2026	Exeter City	108	(5)
2026–	Bristol Rovers	0	(0)

International career^{‡}
2014	Scotland U15	1	(0)
2014–2015	Scotland U16	3	(1)
2015–2017	Scotland U17	19	(2)
2017–2019	Scotland U19	17	(11)
- * Club domestic league appearances and goals as of 28 April 2026 (UTC) ‡ National team caps and goals as of 02:24, 20 October 2019 (UTC)

Jack Aitchison (born 5 March 2000) is a Scottish professional footballer who plays as a forward for EFL League Two club Bristol Rovers.

== Career ==
=== Celtic ===
Aitchison graduated from Celtic's school of excellence at St Ninian's High School in Kirkintilloch in February 2016, at which time he joined Celtic full-time and became part of their Under 17 squad. He played in the Celtic U17 side that defeated their Rangers counterparts 4–0 in the Glasgow Cup final in April 2016. At this time, he also signed a three-year contract. During his youth career he also appeared and scored in the 2015–16 and 2016–17 editions of the UEFA Youth League, found the net against senior clubs in the 2016–17 Scottish Challenge Cup, and won the Scottish Youth Cup in 2017.

Aitchison made his first team debut on 15 May 2016, becoming the youngest player ever to represent the club in a competitive match at 16 years and 71 days. He scored with his first touch in the match, providing Celtic's seventh goal in a 7–0 win over Motherwell, in turn making him the youngest ever player to score a competitive goal for the club. His next appearance for the first team came in January 2017, coming on in the final minutes of a home league match against Hearts and winning a penalty which Scott Sinclair converted for Celtic's last goal in a 4–0 win.

Aitchison joined League One club Dumbarton on loan in August 2018. He was then loaned to Championship club Alloa Athletic in January 2019.

On 2 September 2019, Aitchison moved on a season-long loan deal to English League Two club Forest Green Rovers. He scored on his debut as a substitute in a 1–0 win away to Cambridge United on 7 September 2019.

=== Barnsley ===
On 5 October 2020, Aitchison joined Championship side Barnsley on a three-year contract after leaving Celtic.

==== Forest Green Rovers (loan) ====
On 2 July 2021, Aitchison returned to former loan club Forest Green Rovers, again on loan for the duration of the 2021–22 season.

=== Motherwell ===
On 31 January 2023, Aitchison joined Scottish Premiership club Motherwell on a permanent deal until the end of the season.

=== Exeter City ===
On 28 June 2023, Aitchison agreed to join League One side Exeter City on a two-year deal.

In May 2025, Aitchison signed a new one-year deal until the end of the 2025–26 season.

=== Bristol Rovers ===
On 29 June 2026, Aitchison agreed to join League Two side Bristol Rovers on a two-year deal.

== Career statistics ==
As of match played on 6 April 2026

Appearances and goals by club, season and competition
Club	Season	League			National cup (Note: Includes FA Cup, Scottish Cup)		League cup (Note: Includes EFL Cup)		Other		Total	
Club	Season	Division	Apps	Goals	Apps	Goals	Apps	Goals	Apps	Goals	Apps	Goals
Celtic	2015–16	Scottish Premiership	1	1	0	0	0	0	0	0	1	1
Celtic	2016–17	Scottish Premiership	2	0	0	0	0	0	3 (Note: Appearances in the Scottish League Challenge Cup for Celtic U20s.)	2	5	0
Celtic	2017–18	Scottish Premiership	0	0	0	0	0	0	1 (Note: Appearances in Scottish League Challenge Cup for Celtic U20s.)	0	1	0
Celtic	2018–19	Scottish Premiership	0	0	0	0	0	0	1 (Note: Appearances in Scottish League Challenge Cup for Celtic U20s.)	0	1	0
Celtic	2019–20	Scottish Premiership	0	0	0	0	0	0	2 (Note: Appearances in Scottish League Challenge Cup for Celtic U20s.)	1	2	0
Celtic	Total		3	1	0	0	0	0	7	3	10	4
Dumbarton (loan)	2018–19	Scottish League One	4	0	0	0	0	0	0	0	4	0
Alloa Athletic (loan)	2018–19	Scottish Championship	10	1	1	0	0	0	0	0	11	1
Forest Green Rovers (loan)	2019–20	League Two	28	5	2	1	0	0	0	0	30	6
Barnsley	2020–21	Championship	0	0	0	0	0	0	0	0	0	0
Barnsley	2021–22	Championship	0	0	0	0	0	0	0	0	0	0
Barnsley	2022–23	League One	20	3	1	0	1	0	1 (Note: Appearance(s) in EFL Trophy)	0	23	3
Barnsley	Total		20	3	1	0	1	0	1	0	23	3
Stevenage (loan)	2020–21	League Two	26	1	1	0	0	0	0	0	27	1
Forest Green Rovers (loan)	2021–22	League Two	46	5	1	1	2	1	4	0	53	7
Motherwell	2022–23	Scottish Premiership	10	0	1	0	0	0	0	0	11	0
Exeter City	2023–24	League One	37	4	1	0	1	0	2	0	41	4
Exeter City	2024–25	League One	28	0	3	0	1	0	2	1	34	1
Exeter City	2025–26	League One	40	1	2	2	0	0	3	1	46	4
Exeter City	Total		106	5	7	2	2	0	7	2	120	9
Career total			253	23	14	2	5	1	19	5	288	31

== Honours ==
Forest Green Rovers

- EFL League Two: 2021–22
