= Matty Stevens =

English footballer and boxer (born 1998)

Mathew Stevens
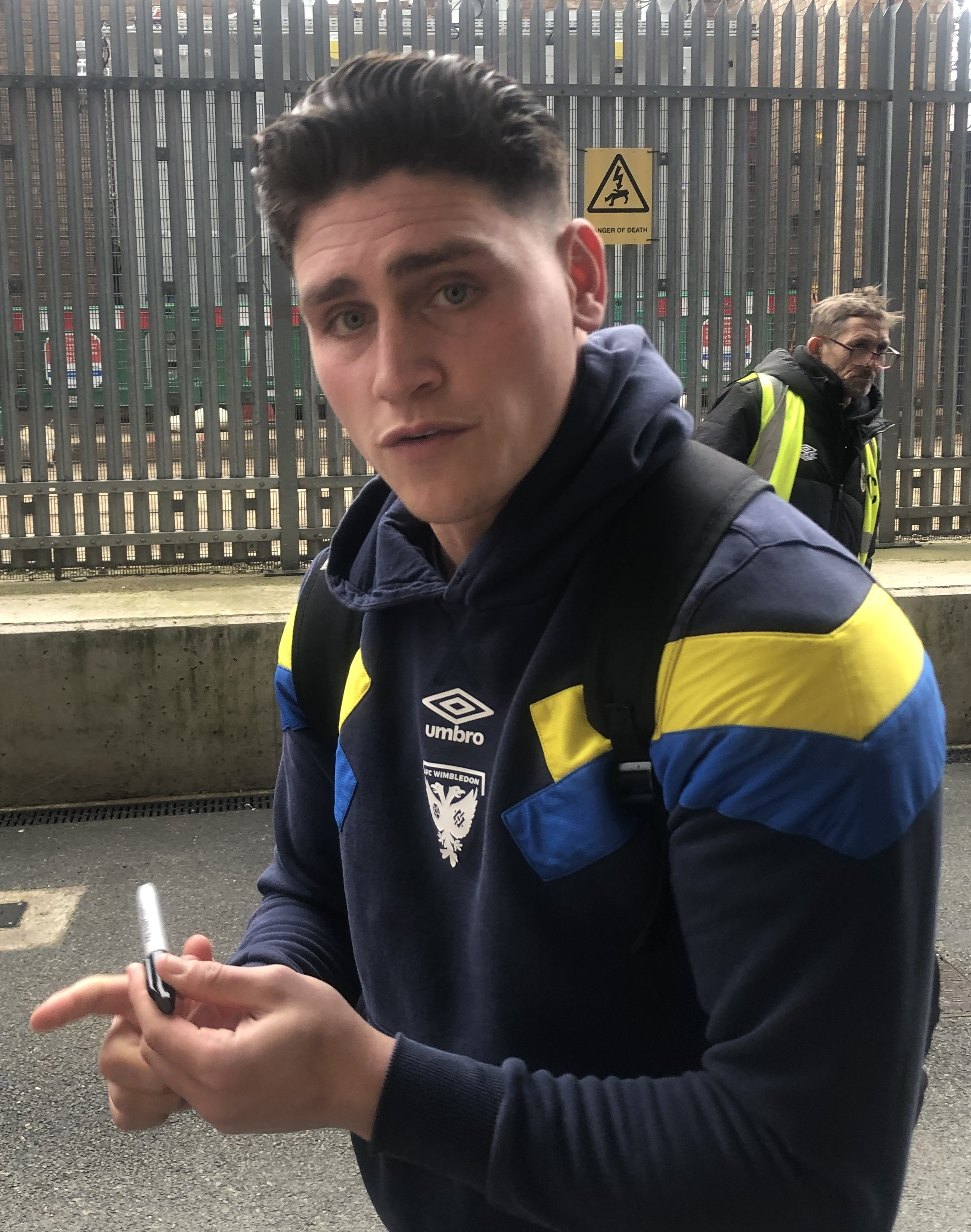
- Stevens in 2025

Personal information
- Full name: Mathew Antony Stevens
- Date of birth: 12 February 1998 (age 28)
- Place of birth: Frimley, England
- Height: 5 ft 11 in (1.80 m)
- Position: Forward

Team information
- Current team: AFC Wimbledon
- Number: 14

Youth career
- Aldershot Town
- Farnborough
- 2005–2014: Reading
- 2014: Barnet

Senior career*
Years	Team	Apps	(Gls)
2014–2016	Barnet	11	(1)
2016–2019	Peterborough United	4	(0)
2016–2017	→ Cambridge City (loan)	4	(1)
2017	→ Sligo Rovers (loan)	10	(1)
2017–2018	→ Kettering Town (loan)	44	(25)
2018	→ Slough Town (loan)	9	(6)
2019–2024	Forest Green Rovers	109	(38)
2021	→ Stevenage (loan)	18	(1)
2023	→ Walsall (loan)	17	(1)
2024–	AFC Wimbledon	74	(26)
- * Club domestic league appearances and goals as of 1 November 2026 (UTC)

Mathew Antony Stevens (born 12 February 1998) is an English footballer and former amateur boxer who plays as a forward for EFL League One club AFC Wimbledon.

== Early life and boxing career ==
Stevens was born into a boxing family – grandfather Les Stevens was a professional boxer who fought John Conteh in 1974. Stevens, who fought out of Pinewood Starr ABC in Crowthorne and once sparred with Tim Witherspoon, won four national titles during his brief career at youth level. In 2011, he won the ABAE Schools national title and the GB Schoolboy 3 Nations title, repeating the feat again in 2012. Stevens was undefeated during his boxing career. While at school in Berkshire, he was a classmate of future AFC Wimbledon teammate Steve Seddon.

== Football career ==
=== Barnet ===
Stevens quit boxing aged 15, although while still fighting he was part of the youth teams at Aldershot Town, Farnborough, and Reading, where he scored 32 goals in the 2013–14 season at U-16 level. Stevens joined Barnet in the summer of 2014 on a two-year scholarship. Impressive goal scoring form for the youth team early in the season saw him make his senior debut against Alfreton Town on 6 September 2014, coming on as a substitute for Sam Togwell after 82 minutes, becoming Barnet's youngest ever player aged 16 years and 204 days, a record previously held by Mauro Vilhete (a record lost to Dwight Pascal in 2016). His first senior goal for the Bees came in the Herts Senior Cup against St. Margaretsbury on 26 November 2014. The following month he scored again in the FA Trophy against Concord Rangers on 16 December 2014 – scoring a Panenka penalty – and also becoming Barnet's youngest ever goalscorer in a national competition. Stevens scored 57 goals in all competitions (including youth games) in the 2014–15 season – attracting interest from larger clubs, including Swansea City, who had a £250,000 offer for Stevens rejected in May 2015. A bid was also received from Crystal Palace with both Manchester United and Manchester City sending scouts to watch him play.

Stevens scored six times for the Bees in 2015–16 pre-season, and made his Football League debut when he came on as an 87th-minute substitute for Michael Gash against Leyton Orient on 8 August 2015. Barnet transfer listed Stevens in January 2016 after he turned down two contract offers from the club. Stevens scored his first league goal for the Bees against AFC Wimbledon on 20 January 2016.

=== Peterborough United ===
Stevens signed for Peterborough United on 1 July 2016, signing a three-year deal.

Stevens joined Cambridge City on loan in December 2016, before joining Sligo Rovers on loan on 14 January 2017. He scored three goals in twelve appearances for Sligo. Stevens joined Kettering Town on loan in August 2017 until the rest of the season, and finished as top scorer with 25 league goals. Stevens also finished as top scorer for Posh in 2018–19 pre-season before joinining Slough Town on loan on 31 August 2018 until the New Year, but was recalled in early December.

He was transfer-listed by Peterborough United at the end of the 2018–19 season.

=== Forest Green Rovers ===
Stevens joined Forest Green Rovers on a three-year deal for an undisclosed fee in July 2019. He scored his first goals for Forest Green when he scored twice in an EFL Trophy tie against Southampton U21 on 3 September 2019. On 5 January 2021, Stevens joined Stevenage on loan until the end of the season.

After an impressive start to the 2021–22 season that saw Stevens score five goals in the opening five matches of the season, he was awarded the league's Player of the Month award for August 2021 with manager Rob Edwards scooping the Manager of the Month award. Stevens went on to score 27 goals in all competitions in the 2021–22 season. His performances earned him a place in the PFA Team of the Year for his division as well as the EFL League Two Team of the Year. He was also named as the club's Supporters' Player of the Season as Forest Green won promotion to League One as champions.

On 31 January 2023, Stevens joined Walsall on loan until the end of the season.

Following the second of Forest Green's back-to-back relegations, Stevens was released at the end of the 2023–24 season. He departed as the club's all-time joint-second highest goalscorer with 51 goals in 133 appearances.

=== AFC Wimbledon ===
On 20 May 2024, it was confirmed that Stevens would sign for League Two AFC Wimbledon on a two-year deal. On 10 August 2024 he scored on his Wimbledon debut in a 4–2 win over Colchester United. On 10 April 2025, Stevens signed a two-year contract extension with Wimbledon, keeping him at the club until 2027.

== Career statistics ==
As of end of 2025–26 season

Appearances and goals by club, season and competition
Club	Season	League			National Cup (Note: Includes FA Cup, FAI Cup)		League Cup (Note: Includes EFL Cup, League of Ireland Cup)		Other		Total	
Club	Season	Division	Apps	Goals	Apps	Goals	Apps	Goals	Apps	Goals	Apps	Goals
Barnet	2014–15	Conference Premier	1	0	1	0	–		3 (Note: Two appearances and one goal in FA Trophy, one appearance and one goal in Herts Senior Cup)	2	5	2
Barnet	2015–16	League Two	10	1	0	0	0	0	1 (Note: Appearances in Football League/EFL Trophy)	0	11	1
Barnet	Total		11	1	1	0	0	0	4	2	16	3
Peterborough United	2016–17	League One	1	0	0	0	0	0	1	0	2	0
Peterborough United	2017–18	League One	0	0	0	0	0	0	0	0	0	0
Peterborough United	2018–19	League One	3	0	0	0	0	0	0	0	3	0
Peterborough United	Total		4	0	0	0	0	0	1	0	5	0
Cambridge City (loan)	2016–17	Southern League Premier Division	4	1	0	0	0	0	0	0	4	1
Sligo Rovers (loan)	2017	League of Ireland Premier Division	10	1	0	0	2	2	–		12	3
Kettering Town (loan)	2017–18	Southern League Premier Division	44	25	4	0	0	0	6 (Note: Three appearances and four goals in Northamptonshire Senior Cup, two appearances and one goal in Southern League Cup, one appearance in Southern League play-offs)	5	54	30
Slough Town (loan)	2018–19	National League South	9	6	8	2	0	0	2 (Note: One appearance in FA Trophy, two appearances and three goals in Berks & Bucks Senior Cup)	3	19	11
Forest Green Rovers	2019–20	League Two	29	4	3	1	2	0	2	2	36	7
Forest Green Rovers	2020–21	League Two	10	2	1	0	1	0	4	3	16	5
Forest Green Rovers	2021–22	League Two	37	23	1	1	0	0	4	3	42	27
Forest Green Rovers	2022–23	League One	5	0	1	0	0	0	0	0	6	0
Forest Green Rovers	2023–24	League Two	28	9	2	1	1	0	2	1	33	11
Forest Green Rovers	Total		109	38	8	3	4	0	12	9	133	50
Stevenage (loan)	2020–21	League Two	18	1	0	0	0	0	0	0	18	1
Walsall (loan)	2022–23	League Two	17	1	0	0	0	0	0	0	17	1
AFC Wimbledon	2024–25	League Two	45	17	2	2	3	1	6	1	56	21
AFC Wimbledon	2025–26	League One	28	9	0	0	1	0	2	1	31	10
AFC Wimbledon	Total		73	26	2	2	4	1	8	2	86	31
Career total			299	99	23	7	10	3	33	21	364	131

== Honours ==
Forest Green Rovers

- EFL League Two: 2021–22

AFC Wimbledon

- EFL League Two play-offs: 2025

Individual

- EFL League Two Player of the Month: August 2021
- PFA Team of the Year: 2021–22 League Two
- EFL League Two Team of the Year: 2021–22
- Forest Green Rovers Supporters' Player of the Season: 2021–22
