= Kane Wilson =

English footballer (born 2000)

Personal information
- Full name: Kane Leo Wilson
- Date of birth: 11 March 2000 (age 26)
- Place of birth: Birmingham, England
- Height: 5 ft 10 in (1.78 m)
- Position: Right-back

Team information
- Current team: Milton Keynes Dons
- Number: 12

Youth career
- 2007–2016: West Bromwich Albion

Senior career*
Years	Team	Apps	(Gls)
2016–2020	West Bromwich Albion	0	(0)
2017–2018	→ Exeter City (loan)	19	(1)
2018–2019	→ Walsall (loan)	14	(0)
2019	→ Exeter City (loan)	17	(0)
2019–2020	→ Tranmere Rovers (loan)	13	(0)
2020–2022	Forest Green Rovers	70	(4)
2022–2023	Bristol City	5	(0)
2023–2025	Derby County	74	(5)
2025–	Milton Keynes Dons	1	(0)

International career^{‡}
2015–2016	England U16	5	(1)
2016	England U17	1	(0)
- * Club domestic league appearances and goals as of 18:00, 6 September 2025 (UTC) ‡ National team caps and goals as of 21:41, 23 August 2016 (UTC)

Kane Leo Wilson (born 11 March 2000) is an English professional footballer who plays as a right-back for EFL League One club Milton Keynes Dons.

Wilson joined the West Bromwich Albion aged 7, and would make his first and only appearance for the first team in 2016, he would have loan spells at Exeter City (twice), Walsall and Tranmere Rovers.

In 2020, Wilson signed with Forest Green Rovers and in the 2021–22 season, Wilson would be named League Two player of the season in the 2022 EFL Awards, as Forest Green won the League Two title. In June 2022, Wilson signed with Bristol City, an injury hit season would limit his appearances and in 2023, Wilson left to join Derby County, where in his first season he helped the side win automatic promotion to the Championship. In August 2025, Wilson left Derby to join Milton Keynes Dons.

== Club career ==
=== West Bromwich Albion ===
Wilson came to West Bromwich Albion at the age of 7, alongside Sam Field, and they were joined by Jonathan Leko three years later: all made their professional debuts in 2016. Wilson spent most of the 2015–16 season in their under-18 team, making only three appearances in the under-21 team, all as a substitute. However, he was fast-tracked into the first team for their summer tour to Austria. He played his first senior game against Paris Saint-Germain and his first start against Torquay United.

Wilson made his competitive debut in the EFL Cup first round away to Northampton Town on 23 August 2016, coming on in the 70th minute for fellow debutant Brendan Galloway. The game ended as a 2–2 draw which his team lost 4–3 on penalties.

Five days after his debut, Wilson was named in West Brom's squad for their Premier League game against Middlesbrough at The Hawthorns. Had he come onto the pitch, he would have been the league's first player born in the 2000s.

==== Exeter City loan ====
Wilson joined Exeter City on loan for five months on the summer transfer deadline day. He did not make his league debut until 28 October, in a 1–1 draw at Mansfield Town. He was sent off on his debut for accumulating two yellow cards, being given his marching orders in the 93rd minute.

==== Tranmere Rovers loan ====
On 9 August 2019, Wilson joined Tranmere Rovers on loan until January 2020, making his debut the next day in a 2–0 loss to Portsmouth

=== Forest Green Rovers ===
Wilson signed permanently with Forest Green Rovers on a two-year deal on 8 July 2020.

The 2021–22 season brought success for Wilson on both a club and individual level. With promotion to League One secured for the first time in the club's history after a 0–0 draw with Bristol Rovers, Wilson was awarded the League Two Player of the Season award the following day at the 2022 EFL Awards as well as being named in the 2021–22 League Two Team of the Season.

=== Bristol City ===
On 10 June 2022, Wilson signed a three-year contract for Championship team Bristol City. In a season hampered by injury, the full-back made seven appearances, providing one goal and one assist for the Robins.

=== Derby County ===
On 10 July 2023, Wilson signed a two-year deal with Derby County for an undisclosed fee. Wilson picked up a minor knee injury in the match at home to Oxford United on 15 August which ruled him out of action for four weeks. Upon his return, Wilson became a fans favourite with his skills and his desire to take opposition on as he showed in a substitute appearance in 3–0 victory against Barnsley on 11 November 2023. In a November 2023 interview to the Derby Telegraph, Wilson appreciated the support he got from Derby fans since he joined and after difficult period at Bristol City under Nigel Pearson due to injuries and not being in favour, Wilson was keen to follow the example of teammate Craig Forsyth and develop his game at Derby under head coach Paul Warne long term. Wilson scored his first goal for Derby in a 3–1 League One win against Lincoln City on 21 December 2023, scoring to make the game 2–1 after he came on as a half-time substitute, he also assisted the third Derby goal scored by James Collins. On 16 March 2024, Wilson scored his second goal for Derby in a 1–0 win over promotion rivals Bolton Wanderers. Wison made 49 appearances, scoring three times during his first season as Derby as they finished runners-up in the division and earn promotion to the Championship automatically.

On 9 August 2024, Wilson scored in Derby's first game of the 2024–25 season in a 4–2 defeat at Blackburn Rovers in the Championship. On 17 August 2024, Wilson picked up a hamstring injury in the match against Middlesbrough. He returned a month later and scored his second goal of the season in Derby's 4–0 win over Portsmouth on 13 December 2024. Wilson had another hamstring injury in January 2025 which ruled him out for six weeks. Upon his return from this injury Derby made a change at head coach, with John Eustace utilising Wilson in a right-wing back role and his performance earned praise from Eustace. Derby avoided relegation by one point after improved form which coincided with Wilson's return to the team, after this feat it was announced the Derby had trigged a one-year extension clause to Wilson's contract which was due to expire in June 2025, as Derby and Wilson started talks over a longer-term deal. Wilson played 35 times for Derby during the season, scoring twice.

Wilson had knee surgery in the summer break ahead of the 2025–26 season and missed Derby's opening four games of the season in his rehabilitation from the surgery. Wilson left Derby in August 2025, appearing 85 times, scoring five time during his two-year spell at the club.

=== Milton Keynes Dons ===
On 31 August 2025, Wilson joined Milton Keynes Dons of League Two for an undisclosed fee, reuniting with former Derby manager Paul Warne. He made his full league debut for the club on 6 September 2025 in a 2–3 home defeat to Grimsby Town, but lasted just 72 minutes before sustaining a serious knee injury which ruled him out for the remainder of the season.

== International career ==
Wilson has represented England at U16 and U17 level. In October 2016, Wilson represented England U17 in a 5–0 win over Croatia and an 8–1 win over Germany.

== Personal life ==
Wilson received his GCSE results in the week before his professional debut. His grades were two A's, four B's and five C's. He is of Jamaican descent.

== Career statistics ==
As of 6 September 2025

Appearances and goals by club, season and competition
Club	Season	League			FA Cup		League Cup		Other		Total	
Club	Season	Division	Apps	Goals	Apps	Goals	Apps	Goals	Apps	Goals	Apps	Goals
West Bromwich Albion	2016–17	Premier League	0	0	0	0	1	0	—		1	0
West Bromwich Albion	2017–18	Premier League	0	0	0	0	0	0	—		0	0
West Bromwich Albion	2018–19	Championship	0	0	0	0	0	0	—		0	0
West Bromwich Albion	2019–20	Championship	0	0	0	0	0	0	—		0	0
West Bromwich Albion	Total		0	0	0	0	1	0	—		1	0
West Bromwich Albion U23	2016–17	—			—		—		2 (Note: Appearance(s) in EFL Trophy)	0	2	0
Exeter City (loan)	2017–18	League Two	19	1	1	0	—		2	0	22	1
Walsall (loan)	2018–19	League One	14	0	0	0	2	0	4	0	20	0
Exeter City (loan)	2018–19	League Two	17	0	—		—		—		17	0
Tranmere Rovers (loan)	2019–20	League One	13	0	2	0	1	0	1	0	17	0
Forest Green Rovers	2020–21	League Two	25	1	1	0	1	0	4 (Note: Appearance(s) in EFL Trophy and League Two play-offs)	0	33	1
Forest Green Rovers	2021–22	League Two	45	3	1	0	2	0	0	0	48	3
Forest Green Rovers	Total		70	4	2	0	3	0	4	0	79	4
Bristol City	2022–23	Championship	5	0	0	0	2	1	—		7	1
Derby County	2023–24	League One	41	3	2	0	1	0	5	0	49	3
Derby County	2024–25	Championship	33	2	1	0	1	0	—		35	2
Derby County	2025–26	Championship	0	0	—		1	0	—		1	0
Derby County	Total		74	5	3	0	3	0	5	0	85	5
Milton Keynes Dons	2025–26	League Two	1	0	—		—		—		1	0
Milton Keynes Dons	2026–27	League One	0	0	0	0	0	0	0	0	0	0
Milton Keynes Dons	Total		1	0	0	0	0	0	0	0	1	0
Career total			213	10	8	0	12	1	18	0	251	11

== Honours ==
Forest Green Rovers

- EFL League Two: 2021–22

Derby County

- EFL League One second-place promotion: 2023–24

Individual

- EFL League Two Player of the Season: 2021–22
- EFL League Two Team of the Season: 2021–22
- PFA Team of the Year: 2021–22 League Two
