= Luke McGee =

English footballer

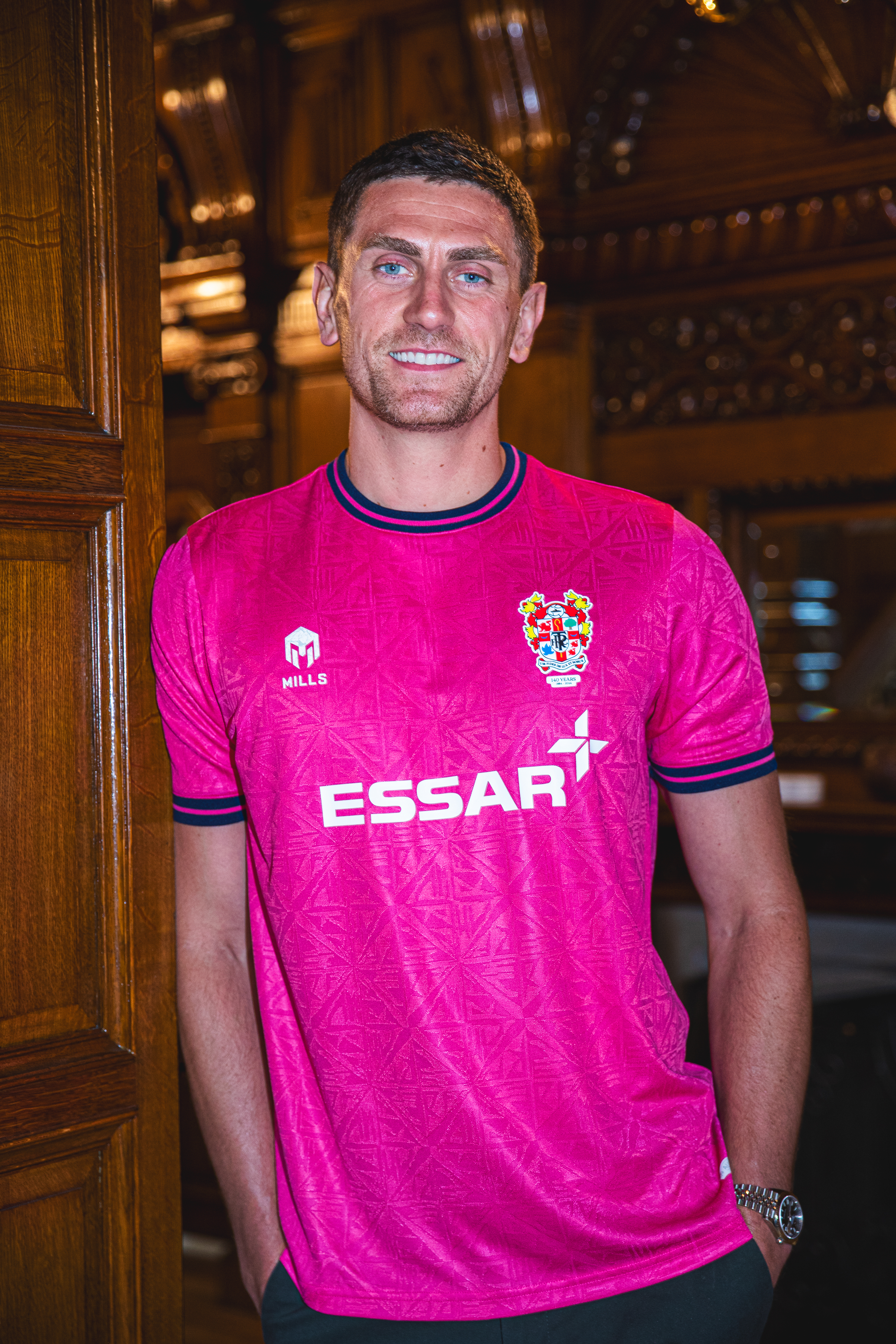
- McGee modelling the Tranmere Rovers goalkeeper kit for the 2024/25 season.

Personal information
- Full name: Luke Paul McGee
- Date of birth: 2 September 1995 (age 31)
- Place of birth: Edgware, England
- Height: 1.93 m (6 ft 4 in)
- Position: Goalkeeper

Team information
- Current team: Tranmere Rovers
- Number: 1

Youth career
- 2012–2014: Tottenham Hotspur

Senior career*
Years	Team	Apps	(Gls)
2014–2017	Tottenham Hotspur	0	(0)
2016–2017	→ Peterborough United (loan)	39	(0)
2017–2020	Portsmouth	44	(0)
2020	→ Bradford City (loan)	4	(0)
2020–2023	Forest Green Rovers	101	(0)
2023	→ Derby County (loan)	0	(0)
2023–	Tranmere Rovers	96	(0)
- * Club domestic league appearances and goals as of 15:15, 26 April 2026 (UTC)

Luke Paul McGee (born 2 September 1995) is an English professional goalkeeper who plays for EFL League Two club Tranmere Rovers.

== Playing career ==
=== Tottenham Hotspur ===
McGee turned professional at Tottenham Hotspur in July 2014, and in October 2015 signed a new contract to keep him at White Hart Lane until 2019. On 31 August 2016, he joined League One club Peterborough United on a four-month loan deal after the club opted to release Ben Alnwick. He made his debut in the English Football League on 10 September, in a 2–2 draw with Port Vale at London Road.

=== Portsmouth ===
On 12 July 2017, McGee joined League One club Portsmouth, signing a three-year contract at the club.

==== Bradford City (loan) ====
On 16 January 2020, McGee signed for Bradford City for the remainder on the 2019–20 season.

=== Forest Green Rovers ===
McGee moved to Forest Green Rovers on 15 July 2020 on a two-year deal.

McGee was awarded the EFL League Two Player of the Month award for January 2022 after conceding just one goal in six matches as his side moved ten points clear at the top of the table.

On 29 January 2023, McGee joined Derby County on loan until the end of the 2022–23 season. He did not make a first team appearance as acted as deputy to Joe Wildsmith. McGee was released by Forest Green in May 2023 at the end of his contract.

=== Tranmere Rovers ===
McGee joined Tranmere Rovers on a one-year contract on 30 June 2023. On 14 December 2023, McGee signed a new deal to take him to the end of the 2024-2025 season. On 15 May 2025, Luke McGee signed a new deal to take him to the end of the 2026/27 season.

== Career statistics ==
As of match played 30 August 2025

Appearances and goals by club, season and competition
Club	Season	League			FA Cup		League Cup		Other		Total	
Club	Season	Division	Apps	Goals	Apps	Goals	Apps	Goals	Apps	Goals	Apps	Goals
Tottenham Hotspur	2016–17	Premier League	0	0	0	0	0	0	0	0	0	0
Peterborough United (loan)	2016–17	League One	39	0	4	0	0	0	2 (Note: Appearance(s) in EFL Trophy)	0	45	0
Portsmouth	2017–18	League One	44	0	1	0	1	0	4	0	50	0
Portsmouth	2018–19	League One	0	0	0	0	1	0	4	0	5	0
Portsmouth	2019–20	League One	0	0	0	0	0	0	0	0	0	0
Portsmouth	Total		44	0	1	0	2	0	8	0	55	0
Bradford City (loan)	2019–20	League Two	4	0	0	0	0	0	0	0	4	0
Forest Green Rovers	2020–21	League Two	33	0	0	0	1	0	3 (Note: One appearance in EFL Trophy, two appearances in EFL League Two play-offs)	0	37	0
Forest Green Rovers	2021–22	League Two	46	0	1	0	0	0	1	0	48	0
Forest Green Rovers	2022–23	League One	22	0	1	0	2	0	0	0	25	0
Forest Green Rovers	Total		101	0	2	0	3	0	4	0	110	0
Derby County (loan)	2022–23	League One	0	0	—		—		—		0	0
Tranmere Rovers	2023–24	League Two	45	0	1	0	0	0	1	0	47	0
Tranmere Rovers	2024–25	League Two	46	0	1	0	0	0	0	0	47	0
Tranmere Rovers	2025–26	League Two	5	0	0	0	1	0	0	0	6	0
Tranmere Rovers	Total		96	0	2	0	1	0	1	0	100	0
Career total			284	0	9	0	6	0	15	0	314	0

== Honours ==
Forest Green Rovers

- EFL League Two: 2021–22

Individual

- EFL League Two Player of the Month: January 2022
