= Opi Edwards =

Ghanaian footballer

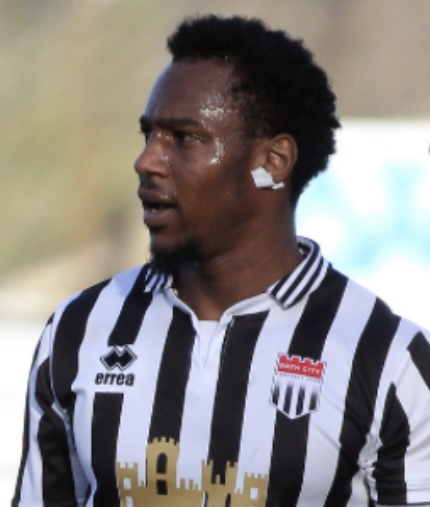

Personal information
- Full name: Opanin Osafo-Adjei Edwards
- Date of birth: 30 April 1999 (age 27)
- Place of birth: Ghana
- Position: Midfielder

Youth career
- 2015–2017: Bristol City

Senior career*
Years	Team	Apps	(Gls)
2017–2021	Bristol City	4	(0)
2017–2018	→ Bath City (loan)	8	(1)
2018	→ Solihull Moors (loan)	5	(0)
2018	→ Bath City (loan)	9	(3)
2018–2019	→ Torquay United (loan)	13	(3)
2019	→ Torquay United (loan)	7	(2)
2021–2022	Forest Green Rovers	0	(0)
2022	→ Torquay United (loan)	6	(0)
2022	Rochester New York	3	(0)
2023	Bath City	4	(1)
2023–2024	Weston-super-Mare	12	(0)
2023	→ Bath City (loan)	4	(0)
2024	→ FC Sholing (loan)	0	(0)
2024	Gloucester City (loan)	1	(0)
2024	Taunton Town	8	(0)
- * Club domestic league appearances and goals as of 16 June 2024

Opanin "Opi" Osafo-Adjei Edwards (born 30 April 1999) is a Ghanaian footballer who plays as a midfielder for Taunton Town.

== Club career ==
=== Bristol City ===
Edwards made his senior debut for Bristol City playing 90 minutes in a 3–0 loss at Watford in the FA Cup.

Edwards made his league debut for the club on 28 November 2020, coming off of the bench in the 86 minute of a 3–1 away defeat at Reading.

=== Forest Green Rovers ===
On 21 June 2021, Edwards agreed a deal to join Forest Green Rovers on a free transfer on a one-year deal following his release from Bristol City.

=== Rochester New York FC ===
On 2 September 2022, Edwards signed a deal to join MLS Next Pro club Rochester New York FC. Two days later, he made his debut for the club, coming off the bench in a 2–1 win against Philadelphia Union II.

=== Return to England ===
In March 2023, Edwards returned to England when he joined Bath City on a short-term deal having previously had two previous loan spells with the National League South club.

On 28 July 2023, Edwards signed for National League South newcomers Weston-super-Mare following a successful trial period. On 17 February 2024, Edwards joined National League North side Gloucester City on a short-term loan.

In September 2024, Edwards Joined Taunton Town on a short-term deal.

== Personal life ==
He is the older brother of fellow footballer Owura Edwards.

== Career statistics ==
As of June 16, 2024

Appearances and goals by club, season and competition
Club	Season	League			FA Cup		EFL Cup		Other		Total	
Club	Season	Division	Apps	Goals	Apps	Goals	Apps	Goals	Apps	Goals	Apps	Goals
Bristol City	2017–18	Championship	0	0	1	0	0	0	—		1	0
Bristol City	2018–19	Championship	0	0	0	0	0	0	—		0	0
Bristol City	2019–20	Championship	0	0	0	0	0	0	—		0	0
Bristol City	2020–21	Championship	4	0	0	0	0	0	—		4	0
Bristol City	Total		4	0	1	0	0	0	—		5	0
Bath City (loan)	2017–18	National League South	17	4	—		—		4 (Note: Two appearances in FA Trophy, two appearances in Somerset Premier Cup)	0	21	4
Solihull Moors (loan)	2017–18	National League	5	0	—		—		0	0	5	0
Torquay United (loan)	2018–19	National League South	13	3	3	0	—		1 (Note: Appearance in FA Trophy)	0	17	3
Torquay United (loan)	2019–20	National League	7	2	—		—		—		7	2
Torquay United (loan)	Total		20	5	3	0	—		1	0	24	5
Forest Green Rovers	2021–22	League Two	0	0	0	0	1	0	3 (Note: Appearances in EFL Trophy)	0	4	0
Torquay United (loan)	2021-22	National League	6	0	—	—	—	—	—	—	6	0
Rochester New York	2022	MLS Next Pro	3	0	—	—	—	—	1 (Note: Appearance in MLS Next Pro Playoffs)	0	4	0
Bath City	2022-23	National League South	4	1	—	—	—	—	—	—	4	1
Weston-super-Mare	2023-24	National League South	12	0	2	0	—	—	1	0	15	0
Gloucester City (loan)	2023-24	National League North	1	0	—	—	—	—	—	—	1	0
Career total			72	10	6	0	1	0	10	0	89	10
