= 2016–17 Peterborough United F.C. season =

Peterborough United
2016–17 season
- Chairman: Darragh MacAnthony
- Manager: Grant McCann
- Stadium: London Road Stadium
- League One: 11th
- FA Cup: Third round
- League Cup: Second round
- EFL Trophy: Group stage
- Top goalscorer: League: Tom Nichols (10); All: Tom Nichols (13)
- Highest home attendance: 9,157 (vs Northampton Town, 18 Oct 2016)
- Lowest home attendance: 2,850 (vs AFC Wimbledon, 9 Aug 2016)
- Average home league attendance: 5,016
Home colours	Away colours

The 2016–17 season was Peterborough United's 57th year in the Football League and their fourth consecutive season in the third tier, League One. Along with League One, the club participated in the FA Cup, League Cup and Football League Trophy. The season covered the period from 1 July 2016 to 30 June 2017.

== Squad ==
No.	Name	Pos.	Nat.	Place of Birth	Age	Apps	Goals	Signed from	Date signed	Fee	Ends
Goalkeepers
1	Luke McGee	GK	(England)	London	31	45	0	Tottenham Hotspur	31 August 2016	Loan	2017
14	Mark Tyler	GK	(England)	Norwich	49	494	0	Luton Town	1 July 2016	Free	2017
Defenders
2	Michael Smith	RB	(Northern Ireland)	Monkstown	38	134	2	Bristol Rovers	25 July 2014	Undisclosed	2019
3	Andrew Hughes	LB	(Wales)	Cardiff	34	46	1	Newport County	1 July 2016	Free	2018
5	Ryan Tafazolli	CB	(England)	Sutton	35	39	3	Mansfield Town	6 June 2016	Free	2019
6	Jack Baldwin	CB	(England)	Barking	33	76	2	Hartlepool United	31 January 2014	£500,000	2018
12	Dominic Ball	CB/DM	(England)	Welwyn Garden City	31	7	1	Rotherham United	3 January 2017	Loan	2017
29	Jerome Binnom-Williams	LB	(England)	Croydon	31	16	0	Crystal Palace	2 August 2016	Undisclosed	2018
Midfielders
4	Michael Bostwick	DM/CB	(England)	Eltham	38	228	23	Stevenage	9 July 2012	Undisclosed	2018
7	Gwion Edwards	RW	(Wales)	Lampeter	33	44	9	Crawley Town	24 June 2016	Free	2019
8	Christopher Forrester	DM	(Republic of Ireland)	Dublin	33	91	6	St Patrick's Athletic	29 August 2015	Undisclosed	2018
11	Marcus Maddison	LW/AM	(England)	Durham	33	128	30	Gateshead	27 August 2014	£250,000	2018
15	Jermaine Anderson	CM	(England)	Camden Town	30	74	7	Academy	1 July 2012	Trainee	Undisclosed
16	Brad Inman	CM	(Australia)	Adelaide	34	12	0	Crew Alexandra	1 July 2016	Free	2019
18	Leonardo Da Silva Lopes	CM	(Portugal)	Lisbon	27	56	4	Academy	1 July 2015	Trainee	Undisclosed
22	Adil Nabi	CM	(England)	Birmingham	32	10	0	West Bromwich Albion	21 January 2016	Undisclosed	2019
23	Callum Chettle	MF	(England)	Nottingham	30	19	0	Nuneaton Town	23 January 2016	Undisclosed	2018
25	Harry Anderson	RW	(England)	Slough	29	18	0	Academy	1 August 2014	Undisclosed	2018
36	Martin Samuelsen	LW	(Norway)	Haugesund	29	33	3	West Ham United	1 January 2017	Loan	2017
42	Anthony Grant	CM	(England)	Lambeth	39	12	0	Port Vale	31 January 2017	Undisclosed	2019
Forwards
10	Paul Taylor	CF/RW	(England)	Liverpool	39	103	20	Ipswich Town	13 July 2016	Free	2017
13	Craig Mackail-Smith	CF	(Scotland) (England)	Watford	42	234	104	Luton Town	31 January 2017	Loan	2017
21	Tom Nichols	CF	(England)	Wellington	33	58	14	Exeter City	1 February 2016	Undisclosed	2020
28	Mathew Stevens	CF	(England)	Surrey	28	2	0	Barnet	1 July 2016	Free	2019
31	Deon Moore	CF	(England)	Croydon	27	6	0	Academy	Hasn't signed professional deal		
37	Junior Morias	CF	(Jamaica)	Kingston	31	20	4	St Albans City	1 January 2017	Undisclosed	2019
Out on loan
9	Lee Angol	CF	(England)	Carshalton	32	52	12	Luton Town	20 July 2015	Undisclosed	2018
17	Shaq Coulthirst	CF	(England)	Hackney	32	42	7	Tottenham Hotspur	22 January 2016	Undisclosed	2019
20	Hayden White	RB	(England)	Greenwich	31	9	0	Bolton Wanderers	1 July 2016	Free	2018
27	Jordan Nicholson	CF	(England)	Godmanchester	33	2	0	Histon	24 December 2015	Undisclosed	2017

=== Statistics ===
As of 3 May 2017

No.	Pos	Nat	Player	Total		League One		FA Cup		League Cup		League Trophy	
No.	Pos	Nat	Player	Apps	Goals	Apps	Goals	Apps	Goals	Apps	Goals	Apps	Goals
1	GK	(England) ENG	Luke McGee (on loan from Tottenham Hotspur)	45	0	39+0	0	4+0	0	0+0	0	2+0	0
2	DF	(Northern Ireland) NIR	Michael Smith	45	0	40+0	0	4+0	0	1+0	0	0+0	0
3	DF	(Wales) WAL	Andrew Hughes	45	1	36+2	1	4+0	0	2+0	0	1+0	0
4	DF	(England) ENG	Michael Bostwick	46	3	39+0	3	4+0	0	2+0	0	1+0	0
5	DF	(England) ENG	Ryan Tafazolli	38	3	30+1	3	4+0	0	0+0	0	3+0	0
6	DF	(England) ENG	Jack Baldwin	29	1	27+0	1	0+0	0	1+0	0	1+0	0
7	MF	(Wales) WAL	Gwion Edwards	41	9	23+10	7	3+1	2	2+0	0	2+0	0
8	MF	(Republic of Ireland) IRL	Christopher Forrester	50	6	39+4	6	4+0	0	2+0	0	1+0	0
10	FW	(England) ENG	Paul Taylor	45	6	23+14	3	2+2	1	2+0	1	1+1	1
11	MF	(England) ENG	Marcus Maddison	47	8	36+4	8	3+0	0	2+0	0	2+0	0
12	DF	(England) ENG	Dominic Ball (on loan from Rotherham United)	6	1	6+0	1	0+0	0	0+0	0	0+0	0
13	FW	(England) ENG	Craig Mackail-Smith	18	5	13+5	5	0+0	0	0+0	0	0+0	0
14	GK	(England) ENG	Mark Tyler	5	0	3+0	0	0+0	0	1+0	0	1+0	0
15	MF	(England) ENG	Jermaine Anderson	10	1	5+2	0	0+0	0	2+0	0	1+0	1
16	MF	(Australia) AUS	Brad Inman	12	0	5+6	0	0+1	0	0+0	0	0+0	0
18	MF	(Portugal) POR	Leonardo Da Silva Lopes	46	4	32+6	2	4+0	1	1+1	1	1+1	0
21	FW	(England) ENG	Tom Nichols	51	13	37+6	10	3+1	1	2+0	2	1+1	0
22	MF	(England) ENG	Adil Nabi	4	0	0+2	0	0+0	0	0+0	0	2+0	0
23	MF	(England) ENG	Callum Chettle	15	0	5+6	0	0+0	0	0+2	0	2+0	0
25	MF	(England) ENG	Harry Anderson	1	0	0+1	0	0+0	0	0+0	0	0+0	0
28	FW	(England) ENG	Matthew Stevens	2	0	0+1	0	0+0	0	0+0	0	0+1	0
29	DF	(England) ENG	Jerome Binnom-Williams	15	0	9+1	0	0+2	0	0+1	0	2+0	0
31	FW	(England) ENG	Deon Moore	6	0	0+4	0	0+0	0	0+0	0	1+1	0
32	DF	(England) ENG	Lewis Freestone	4	0	4+0	0	0+0	0	0+0	0	0+0	0
33	MF	(England) ENG	Morgan Penfold	1	0	0+0	0	0+0	0	0+0	0	0+1	0
34	FW	(England) ENG	Kasey Douglas	1	0	0+0	0	0+0	0	0+0	0	0+1	0
35	DF	(England) ENG	James Goode	0	0	0+0	0	0+0	0	0+0	0	0+0	0
36	MF	(Norway) NOR	Martin Samuelsen (on loan from West Ham United)	12	1	4+7	1	0+1	0	0+0	0	0+0	0
37	FW	(Jamaica) JAM	Junior Morias	20	4	6+14	4	0+0	0	0+0	0	0+0	0
38	MF	(Malta) MLT	Andrea Borg	3	0	1+2	0	0+0	0	0+0	0	0+0	0
42	MF	(England) ENG	Anthony Grant	11	0	11+0	0	0+0	0	0+0	0	0+0	0
Player(s) out on loan:
9	FW	(England) ENG	Lee Angol	15	1	5+8	1	2+0	0	0+0	0	0+0	0
17	FW	(England) ENG	Shaq Coulthirst	22	4	11+5	2	2+1	2	1+1	0	1+0	0
20	DF	(England) ENG	Hayden White	9	0	4+2	0	0+0	0	1+0	0	2+0	0
24	FW	(England) ENG	Aaron Williams	1	0	0+0	0	0+0	0	0+0	0	0+1	0
Player(s) who returned to their parent clubs:
30	MF	(England) ENG	Nathan Oduwa (on loan from Tottenham Hotspur)	9	0	0+6	0	0+1	0	0+0	0	0+2	0
38	MF	(England) ENG	George Moncur (on loan from Barnsley)	15	3	5+8	2	0+0	0	0+0	0	2+0	1
Player(s) who left the club:
1	GK	(England) ENG	Ben Alnwick	5	0	4+0	0	0+0	0	1+0	0	0+0	0
12	DF	(Portugal) POR	Ricardo Almeida Santos	4	0	0+1	0	1+0	0	0+0	0	2+0	0
19	FW	(England) ENG	Joe Gormley	1	0	0+1	0	0+0	0	0+0	0	0+0	0

==== Goals record ====
As of 3 May 2017

Rank	No.	Nat.	Po.	Name	League One	FA Cup	League Cup	League Trophy	Total
1	21	(England)	CF	Tom Nichols	10	1	2	0	13
2	7	(Wales)	RW	Gwion Edwards	7	2	0	0	9
3	11	(England)	LW	Marcus Maddison	8	0	0	0	8
4	8	(Republic of Ireland)	DM	Christopher Forrester	6	0	0	0	6
4	10	(England)	CF	Paul Taylor	3	1	1	1	6
6	13	(Scotland)	CF	Craig Mackail-Smith	5	0	0	0	5
7	17	(England)	CF	Shaq Coulthirst	2	2	0	0	4
7	18	(Portugal)	CM	Leonardo Da Silva Lopes	2	1	1	0	4
7	37	(Jamaica)	CF	Junior Morias	4	0	0	0	4
10	4	(England)	DM	Michael Bostwick	3	0	0	0	3
10	5	(England)	CB	Ryan Tafazolli	3	0	0	0	3
10	~~38~~	(England)	AM	George Moncur	2	0	0	1	3
12	3	(Wales)	LB	Andrew Hughes	1	0	0	0	1
12	6	(England)	CB	Jack Baldwin	1	0	0	0	1
12	9	(England)	CF	Lee Angol	1	0	0	0	1
12	12	(England)	CB	Dominic Ball	1	0	0	0	1
12	15	(England)	CM	Jermaine Anderson	0	0	0	1	1
12	36	(Norway)	AM	Martin Samuelsen	1	0	0	0	1
Own Goals					2	0	0	0	2
Total					63	7	4	3	77

==== Disciplinary record ====
As of 3 May 2017

Rank	No.	Po.	Nat.	Name	League One			FA Cup			League Cup			League Trophy			Total		
Rank	No.	Po.	Nat.	Name	Yellow card	(yellow card) (yellow-red card)	Red card	Yellow card	(yellow card) (yellow-red card)	Red card	Yellow card	(yellow card) (yellow-red card)	Red card	Yellow card	(yellow card) (yellow-red card)	Red card	Yellow card	(yellow card) (yellow-red card)	Red card
1	4	(England)	DM	Michael Bostwick	9	0	0	0	0	0	0	0	0	0	0	0	9	0	0
1	6	(England)	CB	Jack Baldwin	7	2	0	0	0	0	0	0	0	0	0	0	7	2	0
3	18	(Portugal)	CM	Leonardo Da Silva Lopes	6	0	0	0	0	0	1	0	0	0	0	0	7	0	0
4	7	(Wales)	RW	Gwion Edwards	6	0	0	0	0	0	0	0	0	0	0	0	6	0	0
4	8	(Republic of Ireland)	LW	Christopher Forrester	3	0	1	1	0	0	1	0	0	0	0	0	5	0	1
6	3	(Wales)	LB	Andrew Hughes	4	0	1	0	0	0	0	0	0	0	0	0	4	0	1
6	5	(England)	CB	Ryan Tafazolli	3	0	1	1	0	0	0	0	0	0	0	0	4	0	1
6	10	(England)	CF	Paul Taylor	5	0	0	0	0	0	0	0	0	0	0	0	5	0	0
6	11	(England)	LW	Marcus Maddison	4	0	0	0	0	0	0	0	0	1	0	0	5	0	0
10	21	(England)	CF	Tom Nichols	4	0	0	0	0	0	0	0	0	0	0	0	4	0	0
10	42	(England)	CM	Anthony Grant	4	0	0	0	0	0	0	0	0	0	0	0	4	0	0
12	1	(England)	GK	Luke McGee	2	0	0	1	0	0	0	0	0	0	0	0	3	0	0
12	2	(Northern Ireland)	RB	Michael Smith	3	0	0	0	0	0	0	0	0	0	0	0	3	0	0
12	17	(England)	CF	Shaq Coulthirst	3	0	0	0	0	0	0	0	0	0	0	0	3	0	0
15	16	(Australia)	CM	Brad Inman	2	0	0	0	0	0	0	0	0	0	0	0	2	0	0
15	18	(England)	CM	Leonardo Da Silva Lopes	1	1	0	0	0	0	0	0	0	0	0	0	1	1	0
15	37	(Jamaica)	CF	Junior Morias	2	0	0	0	0	0	0	0	0	0	0	0	2	0	0
18	9	(England)	CF	Lee Angol	0	0	0	0	0	1	0	0	0	0	0	0	0	0	1
18	12	(England)	CB	Dominic Ball	1	0	0	0	0	0	0	0	0	0	0	0	1	0	0
18	15	(England)	CM	Jermaine Anderson	1	0	0	0	0	0	0	0	0	0	0	0	1	0	0
18	20	(England)	RB	Hayden White	1	0	0	0	0	0	0	0	0	0	0	0	1	0	0
18	23	(England)	CM	Callum Chettle	1	0	0	0	0	0	0	0	0	0	0	0	1	0	0
18	29	(England)	LB	Jerome Binnom-Williams	1	0	0	0	0	0	0	0	0	0	0	0	1	0	0
18	36	(Norway)	AM	Martin Samuelsen	1	0	0	0	0	0	0	0	0	0	0	0	1	0	0
18	~~38~~	(England)	AM	George Moncur	1	0	0	0	0	0	0	0	0	0	0	0	1	0	0
Total					71	3	3	3	0	1	2	0	0	1	0	0	77	3	4

== Transfers ==
=== Transfers in ===
Date from	Position	Nationality	Name	From	Fee	Ref.
1 July 2016	RW	(Wales)	Gwion Edwards	Crawley Town	Undisclosed	
1 July 2016	CB	(Wales)	Andrew Hughes	Newport County	Free transfer	
1 July 2016	CM	(Australia)	Brad Inman	Crewe Alexandra	Free transfer	
1 July 2016	CF	(England)	Mathew Stevens	Barnet	Compensation	
1 July 2016	CB	(England)	Ryan Tafazolli	Mansfield Town	Free transfer	
1 July 2016	RB	(England)	Hayden White	Bolton Wanderers	Free transfer	
13 July 2016	RW	(England)	Paul Taylor	Free agent	Free transfer	
2 August 2016	LB	(England)	Jerome Binnom-Williams	Crystal Palace	Undisclosed	
1 January 2017	CF	(England)	Junior Morias	St Albans City	Undisclosed	
31 January 2017	CM	(England)	Anthony Grant	Port Vale	Undisclosed	

=== Loans in ===
Date from	Position	Nationality	Name	From	Date until	Ref.
31 August 2016	GK	(England)	Luke McGee	Tottenham Hotspur	End of season (Note: On 16 December 2016, Luke McGee agreed to extend his loan deal until the end of the season.)	
31 August 2016	AM	(England)	George Moncur	Barnsley	3 January 2017	
31 August 2016	LW	(England)	Nathan Oduwa	Tottenham Hotspur	2 January 2017	
1 January 2017	LW	(Norway)	Martin Samuelsen	West Ham United	End of season	
3 January 2017	CB	(England)	Dominic Ball	Rotherham United	End of season	
31 January 2017	CF	(Scotland)	Craig Mackail-Smith	Luton Town	End of season	

=== Transfers out ===
Date from	Position	Nationality	Name	To	Fee	Ref.
1 July 2016	CB	(England)	Shaun Brisley	Carlisle United (Note: Following Brisley's release, he signed for Carlisle United.)	Released	
1 July 2016	CF	(Ivory Coast)	Souleymane Coulibaly	Kilmarnock (Note: Following Coulibaly's release, he signed for Kilmarnock.)	Released	
1 July 2016	CF	(England)	Jonathan Edwards	Hull City	Free transfer	
1 July 2016	LB	(England)	Andrew Fox	Stevenage (Note: Following Fox's release, he signed for Stevenage.)	Released	
1 July 2016	CF	(England)	Jack Friend	Free agent	Released	
1 July 2016	AM	(England)	Erhun Oztumer	Walsall	Free transfer	
1 July 2016	CF	(England)	Kyle Vassell	Blackpool (Note: Following Vassell's release, he signed for Blackpool.)	Released	
1 July 2016	CB	(Democratic Republic of the Congo)	Gabriel Zakuani	Northampton Town (Note: Following Zakuani's release, he signed for Northampton Town.)	Released	
21 July 2016	CM	(England)	Harry Beautyman	Northampton Town	Undisclosed	
3 August 2016	RM	(England)	Jon Taylor	Rotherham United	£500,000	
25 August 2016	CM	(England)	Jack Payne	Blackpool	Free transfer	
31 August 2016	GK	(England)	Ben Alnwick	Bolton Wanderers	Free transfer	
31 August 2016	LB	(South Africa)	Kgosi Nthle	Stevenage	Undisclosed	
1 November 2016	CF	(Northern Ireland)	Joe Gormley	Retired	—N/a	
1 January 2017	CB	(Portugal)	Ricardo Almeida Santos	Barnet	£100,000	
1 January 2017	CF	(England)	Aaron Williams	Newport County	Free transfer	
23 May 2017	GK	(England)	Dion-Curtis Henry	Free Agent	Mutual Consent	

=== Loans out ===
Date from	Position	Nationality	Name	To	Date until	Ref.
1 July 2016	SS	(England)	Jordan Nicholson	Nuneaton Town	1 January 2017	
1 July 2016	CF	(England)	Aaron Williams	Nuneaton Town	1 January 2017	
6 July 2016	CF	(England)	Luke James	Bristol Rovers	End of Season	
16 August 2016	RW	(England)	Harry Anderson	Lincoln City	1 January 2017	
31 August 2016	GK	(England)	Dion-Curtis Henry	Boston United	30 November 2016 (Note: On 30 November 2016, Dion-Curtis Henry was recalled early from his loan spell at Boston United.)	
31 August 2016	CF	(England)	Joe Gormley	St. Johnstone	1 November 2016 (Note: On 1 November 2016, Joe Gormley announced his retirement.)	
12 January 2017	RB	(England)	Hayden White	Mansfield Town	End of Season	
19 January 2017	CF	(England)	Shaq Coulthirst	Mansfield Town	End of Season	

== Competitions ==
=== Pre-season friendlies ===
9 July 2016	Boston United	1–1	Peterborough United	Boston
15:00	Colley 61'	Report	Tafazolli 38'	Stadium: York Street; Attendance: 920 (275 Posh fans)

11 July 2016	Boreham Wood	0–1	Peterborough United	Borehamwood
19:30		Report	Maddison 48' (pen.)	Stadium: Meadow Park

16 July 2016	Peterborough United	0–3	Norwich City	Peterborough
15:00		Report	Jo. Murphy 48'; Jerome 90+7'; Ja. Murphy 90+11'	Stadium: London Road Stadium; Attendance: 2,759 (749 Norwich fans)

21 July 2016 Maunsell Cup	AFC Rushden & Diamonds	2–2	Peterborough United	Wellingborough
19:45	Brown 45'; Orosz 60'	Report	Williams 25'; Freestone 66'	Stadium: Dog & Duck

23 July 2016	Peterborough United	2–1	Leeds United	Peterborough
15:00	Coulthirst 48', 65'	Report	Mowatt 15'	Stadium: London Road Stadium; Attendance: 4,152 (1,970 Leeds fans)

26 July 2016	Brentford	0–1	Peterborough United	Brentford
19:45		Report	Taylor 2'	Stadium: Griffin Road

30 July 2016	Peterborough United	0–2	Barnsley	Peterborough
15:00		Report	Scowen 7'; Payne 89'	Stadium: London Road Stadium

=== League One ===
==== League table ====
Pos	Team	Pld	W	D	L	GF	GA	GD	Pts
9	Rochdale	46	19	12	15	71	62	+9	69
10	Bristol Rovers	46	18	12	16	68	70	−2	66
11	Peterborough United	46	17	11	18	62	62	0	62
12	Milton Keynes Dons	46	16	13	17	60	58	+2	61
13	Charlton Athletic	46	14	18	14	60	53	+7	60

Source: BBC Sport
Rules for classification: 1) Points; 2) Goal difference; 3) Number of goals scored

==== Matches ====
6 August 2016 1	Rochdale	2–3	Peterborough United	Rochdale
15:00 BST	Cannon 8'; Henderson 32' (pen.)	Report	Forrester 21', 37'; Edwards 89'	Stadium: Spotland Stadium; Attendance: 3,243; Referee: David Webb

13 August 2016 2	Peterborough United	0–1	Bradford City	Peterborough
15:00 BST		Report	Hiwula 11'	Stadium: London Road Stadium; Attendance: 5,906; Referee: Darren Handley

16 August 2016 3	Peterborough United	5–1	Millwall	Peterborough
19:45 BST	Maddison 6'; Taylor 7'; Edwards 20', 52'; Nichols 67'	Report	79' Morison	Stadium: London Road Stadium; Attendance: 5,007; Referee: Ross Joyce

20 August 2016 4	Oxford United	2–1	Peterborough United	Oxford
15:00 BST	Thomas 46'; Maguire 90+3' (pen.)	Report	62' Nichols; (yellow card) 90+3' (yellow-red card) Baldwin	Stadium: Kassam Stadium; Attendance: 7,500; Referee: Seb Stockbridge

27 August 2016 5	Milton Keynes Dons	0–2	Peterborough United	Denbigh
15:00 BST		Report	2' Hughes; 71' Bostwick	Stadium: Stadium mk Attendance: 10,261; Referee: Mark Heywood

3 September 2016 6	Peterborough United	2–2	Swindon Town	Peterborough
12:15 BST	Edwards 36'; Maddison 63' (pen.)	Report	Doughty 51' (pen.); Baldwin 76' (o.g.)	Stadium: London Road Stadium; Attendance: 4,501; Referee: Tim Robinson

10 September 2016 7	Peterborough United	2–2	Port Vale	Peterborough
15:00 BST	Moncur 8', 84'; Hughes (red card) 84'	BBC Report	6', 90+4' Jones	Stadium: ABAX Stadium; Attendance: 4,711; Referee: Mark Heywood

17 September 2016 8	Sheffield United	1–0	Peterborough United	Sheffield
15:00 BST	Done 13'; Sharp (yellow card) 62'; Basham (yellow card) 67'; Coutts (yellow card) 78'; Ebanks-Landell (yellow card) 90+1'	Club Report; BBC Report	(yellow card) 74' Moncur; (yellow card) 90+3' Smith	Stadium: Bramall Lane; Attendance: 19,555 (988 Posh fans); Referee: Neil Swarbrick

24 September 2016 9	Peterborough United	1–1	Walsall	Peterborough
15:00 BST	Maddison 27'; Nichols (yellow card) 31'	Report	17' Jackson; (yellow card) 84' Osbourne	Stadium: London Road Stadium; Attendance: 4,906; Referee: Ben Toner

27 September 2016 10	Shrewsbury Town	1–1	Peterborough United	Shrewsbury
19:45 BST	McGivern (yellow card) 31'; Black 56' (penalty missed) (yellow card) 65'	Report	32' Edwards; (red card) 59' Tafazolli	Stadium: Greenhous Meadow; Attendance: 4,314; Referee: Darren Handley

1 October 2016 11	Southend United	1–1	Peterborough United	Southend-on-Sea
15:00 BST	Inniss (yellow card) 29'; Wordsworth (yellow card) 61' (penalty missed) 78' (pen.)	Report	Hughes (yellow card) 25'; Forrester (yellow card) 72'; Maddison 90+2'	Stadium: Roots Hall Stadium; Attendance: 6,417; Referee: Brendan Malone

8 October 2016 12	Peterborough United	3–1	Bury	Peterborough
12:00 BST	Forrester 38'; Maddison 48'; Kay 52' (o.g.); Coulthirst (yellow card) 86'; Lopes (yellow card) 88'; White (yellow card) 90+1'	Report	White 2' (o.g.); Mayor (yellow card) 61'; Maher (yellow card) 66'	Stadium: ABAX Stadium; Attendance: 3,964; Referee: Tony Harrington

15 October 2016 13	Fleetwood Town	2–0	Peterborough United	Fleetwood
15:00 BST	Sowerby 3'; Grant (yellow card) 16' (goal) 65'; Ryan (yellow card) 19'	Report	Baldwin (yellow card) 44'	Stadium: Highbury Stadium; Attendance: 2,711; Referee: Nigel Miller

18 October 2016 14	Peterborough United	3–0	Northampton Town	Peterborough
19:45 BST	Coulthirst 14'; Tafazolli 36'; Maddison (yellow card) 40'; Taylor (yellow card) 52'; Nichols 82'	Report	Byrom (yellow card) 32'; O'Toole (yellow card) 76'	Stadium: ABAX Stadium; Attendance: 9,157; Referee: Neil Swarbrick

22 October 2016 15	Peterborough United	0–1	AFC Wimbledon	Peterborough
15:00 BST	Edwards (yellow card) 71'; Taylor (yellow card) 79'	Report	Elliott 10'; Fuller (yellow card) 84'	Stadium: ABAX Stadium; Attendance: 6,642; Referee: Brett Huxtable

29 October 2016 16	Bristol Rovers	1–2	Peterborough United	Bristol
15:00 BST	Taylor 57' (pen.)	Report	Coulthirst 62' (yellow card) 67'; Bostwick (yellow card) 67'; Nichols 90+2'	Stadium: Memorial Stadium; Attendance: 9,839; Referee: Mark Haywood

13 November 2016 17	Peterborough United	1–0	Bolton Wanderers	Peterborough
12:15 GMT	Coulthirst (yellow card) 10'; Smith 27'	Report	Trotter (yellow card) 28'	Stadium: ABAX Stadium; Attendance: 4,780; Referee: Mark Heywood

19 November 2016 18	Northampton Town	0–1	Peterborough United	Northampton
15:00 GMT		Report	90+2' Forrester	Stadium: Sixfields Stadium; Attendance: 7,675; Referee: Darren Bond

22 November 2016 19	Peterborough United	0–2	Scunthorpe United	Peterborough
19:45 GMT	Baldwin (yellow card) 23'; Coulthirst (yellow card) 45+1'; Edwards (yellow card) 67'	Report	van Veen 21' (yellow card) 24'; Goode (yellow card) 72'; Bishop 83'	Stadium: ABAX Stadium; Attendance: 5,222; Referee: Charles Breakspear

10 December 2016 20	Peterborough United	5–2	Chesterfield	Peterborough
15:00 GMT	Nichols 1', 65'; Bostwick 45', 82' (yellow card) 63'; Taylor 55'; Inman (yellow card) 85'	Report	O'Neil (yellow card) 12' (goal) 25'; Evans 22'; Daly (yellow card) 80'	Stadium: ABAX Stadium; Attendance: 5,120; Referee: Nigel Miller

17 December 2016 21	Charlton Athletic	0–2	Peterborough United	Charlton
15:00 BST		Report	Tafazolli 21'; Edwards 66'	Stadium: The Valley; Attendance: 10,193; Referee: Charles Breakspear

26 December 2016 22	Peterborough United	1–1	Gillingham	Peterborough
15:00 GMT	Angol 78'	Report	Cargill 90+2'	Stadium: ABAX Stadium; Attendance: 6,239; Referee: Graham Horwood

31 December 2016 23	Peterborough United	1–1	Coventry City	Peterborough
15:00 GMT	Bostwick 90+3'	Report	Willis 19'	Stadium: ABAX Stadium; Attendance: 5,866; Referee: John Brooks

2 January 2017 24	Scunthorpe United	1–1	Peterborough United	Scunthorpe
15:00 GMT	Morris 45+1'	Report	Tafazolli (yellow card) 13'; Maddison (yellow card) 42'; Hughes (yellow card) 45+1'; Goode 83' (o.g.)	Stadium: Glanford Park; Attendance: 4,855; Referee: Andy Haines

14 January 2017 25	Bury	5–1	Peterborough United	Bury
15:00 GMT	Vaughan 7', 16', 24', 27'; Miller 71'	Report	Nichols 4'; Tafazolli (yellow card) 12'; Bostwick (yellow card) 52'	Stadium: Gigg Lane; Attendance: 2,820; Referee: Seb Stockbridge

21 January 2017 26	Swindon Town	0–1	Peterborough United	Swindon
15:00 GMT	Thompson (yellow card) 26'; Jones (yellow card) 62'; Gladwin (yellow card) 65'	Report	Smith (yellow card) 37'; Forrester 46'; Maddison (yellow card) 65'	Stadium: The County Ground; Attendance: 6,514; Referee: Trevor Kettle

24 January 2017 27	Oldham Athletic	2–0	Peterborough United	Oldham
19:45 GMT	Amadi-Holloway (yellow card) 40'; Gerrard (yellow card) 54'; Green 69' (pen.); McLaughlin 82'	Report		Stadium: Boundary Park; Attendance: 7,224; Referee: John Brooks

28 January 2017 28	Peterborough United	0–4	Milton Keynes Dons	Peterborough
15:00 GMT	Tafazolli (yellow card) 79'	Report	Baldock (yellow card) 51'; Williams (yellow card) 53'; Barnes 59'; Potter (yellow card) 67'; Agard 71'; Aneke 74', 83'; Walsh (yellow card) 90+1'	Stadium: ABAX Stadium; Attendance: 6,617; Referee: John Busby

4 February 2017 29	Port Vale	0–3	Peterborough United	Burslem
15:00 GMT		Report	Maddison 20'; Morias 90', 90+5'	Stadium: Vale Park; Attendance: 4,259; Referee: Charles Breakspear

11 February 2017 30	Peterborough United	0–1	Sheffield United	Peterborough
15:00 GMT	Edwards (yellow card) 38'; Nichols (yellow card) 40'	Report	Carruthers (yellow card) 43'; Sharp (yellow card) 74' (goal) 87'	Stadium: ABAX Stadium; Attendance: 10,258; Referee: Andy Haines

14 February 2017 31	Peterborough United	2–1	Shrewsbury Town	Peterborough
19:45 GMT	Smith (yellow card) 31'; Tafazolli 71'; Ball 78' (yellow card) 90+3'	Report	Rodman (yellow card) 10'; Humphrys 31' (pen.) (yellow card) 36' (yellow-red card) 55'; Morris (yellow card) 44'	Stadium: ABAX Stadium; Attendance: 4,116; Referee: Carl Boyeson

18 February 2017 32	Walsall	2–0	Peterborough United	Walsall
15:00 GMT	Chambers (yellow card) 50'; Jackson (yellow card) 64'; Bakayoko (yellow card) 79'; Oztumer 90+2'; Dobson (yellow card) 90+5'; Morris 90+7'	Report	Grant (yellow card) 34'; McGee (yellow card) 90+4'; Forrester (red card) 90+4'	Stadium: The Banks's Stadium; Attendance: 4,759; Referee: Mark Haywood

21 February 2017 33	Peterborough United	1–4	Southend United	Peterborough
19:45 GMT	Nichols 80'	Report	Cox (yellow card) 25'; Fortuné 45+1', 60'; Wordsworth 64'; Timlin 90+2'	Stadium: ABAX Stadium; Attendance: 4,597; Referee: Geoff Eltringham

25 February 2017 34	Peterborough United	3–1	Rochdale	Peterborough
15:00 GMT	Lopes (yellow card) 22'; Baldwin 36' (yellow card) 57' (yellow-red card) 80'; Nichols 38'; Taylor 84'	Report	Rafferty (yellow card) 10' (yellow-red card) 45+3'; Thompson 40'; Keane (yellow card) 44'; McDermott (red card) 52'	Stadium: London Road Stadium; Attendance: 4,457; Referee: Chris Sarginson

28 February 2017 35	Millwall	1–0	Peterborough United	Bermondsey, London
19:45 GMT	Gregory 54' (pen.); Ferguson (yellow card) 73'	Report	Grant (yellow card) 53'; Maddison (yellow card) 90+1'; Inman (yellow card) 90+4'	Stadium: The Den; Attendance: 8,032; Referee: Kevin Johnson

4 March 2017 36	Bradford City	1–0	Peterborough United	Bradford
15:00 GMT	Jones 24'; Knight-Percival (yellow card) 39'	Report	Nichols (yellow card) 42'; Hughes (yellow card) 55'; Grant (yellow card) 59'; Bostwick (yellow card) 67'; Samuelsen (yellow card) 79'	Stadium: Valley Parade; Attendance: 17,220; Referee: Brett Huxtable

11 March 2017 37	Peterborough United	1–2	Oxford United	Peterborough
15:00 GMT	Taylor (yellow card) 65'; Lopes (yellow card) 67' (yellow-red card) 85'; Mackail-Smith 90+1'	Report	Edwards 23'; McAleny (yellow card) 45' (goal) 71'; Ledson (yellow card) 87'	Stadium: ABAX Stadium; Attendance: 5,469; Referee: Mark Heywood

14 March 2017 38	Chesterfield	3–3	Peterborough United	Chesterfield
19:45 GMT	Ebanks-Blake 4'; Dennis 27'; Donohue (yellow card) 32' (goal) 54'; Nolan (yellow card) 64'; Kakay (yellow card) 81'	Report	Mackail-Smith 7', 30'; Nichols 17'	Stadium: Proact Stadium; Attendance: 5,048; Referee: Seb Stockbridge

18 March 2017 39	Peterborough United	1–1	Oldham Athletic	Peterborough
15:00 GMT	Baldwin (yellow card) 54'; Morias (yellow card) 67' (goal) 73'; Binnom-Williams (yellow card) 75'	Report	Erwin 11'	Stadium: ABAX Stadium; Attendance: 4,222; Referee: Lee Swabey

25 March 2017 40	Gillingham	0–1	Peterborough United	Gillingham
15:00 GMT	Dack (yellow card) 81'	Report	Grant (yellow card) 36'; Morias 90'	Stadium: Priestfield Stadium; Attendance: 7,561; Referee: Brendan Malone

1 April 2017 41	Peterborough United	2–0	Charlton Athletic	Peterborough
15:00 BST	Samuelsen 74'; Maddison 83'	Report		Stadium: London Road; Attendance: 5,482; Referee: Graham Salisbury

8 April 2017 42	Coventry City	1–0	Peterborough United	Coventry
15:00	Lameiras 51'; Foley (yellow card) 82'	Report	Baldwin (yellow card) 90'	Stadium: Ricoh Arena; Attendance: 10,551; Referee: Gavin Ward

14 April 2017 43	Peterborough United	1–2	Fleetwood Town	Peterborough
15:00 BST	Mackail-Smith 68'	Report	Grant 25'; Eastham 42' (yellow card) 76'; McLaughlin (yellow card) 72'	Stadium: London Road Stadium; Attendance: 5,629; Referee: Eddie Ilderton

17 April 2017 44	AFC Wimbledon	0–0	Peterborough United	Kingsmeadow
15:00 GMT		Report		Attendance: 4,294; Referee: Darren Handley

22 April 2017 45	Peterborough United	4–2	Bristol Rovers	Peterborough
15:00 BST	Lopes 13', 56'; Maddison 30'; Mackail-Smith 64'	Report	Gaffney 85', 90+2'	Stadium: London Road Stadium; Attendance: 5,498; Referee: Richard Clark

30 April 2017 46	Bolton Wanderers	3–0	Peterborough United	Bolton
12:00 BST	Karacan 22'; Wheater 53'; Le Fondre 75'	Report		Stadium: Macron Stadium; Attendance: 22,590; Referee: Scott Duncan

=== FA Cup ===
5 November 2016 First round	Peterborough United	2–1	Chesham United	Peterborough
15:00 GMT	Coulthirst 40', 70'	Report	Blake 80'	Stadium: London Road Stadium; Attendance: 4,328; Referee: Darren Handley

4 December 2016 Second round	Notts County	2–2	Peterborough United	Nottingham
14:00 GMT	O'Connor (yellow card) 16'; Oliver (yellow card) 41'; Campbell 42' (yellow card) 90+5'; Laing (yellow card) 88' (goal) 90+4'	Report	Lopes 3'; Edwards 15'; Angol (red card) 45+3'; McGee (yellow card) 64'	Stadium: Meadow Lane Stadium; Attendance: 3,940; Referee: Ben Toner

20 December 2016 Second round replay	Peterborough United	2–0	Notts County	Peterborough
19:45 GMT	Edwards 2'; Taylor 8'	Report	Stead (penalty missed) 37'	Stadium: London Road Stadium; Attendance: 7,796; Referee: Darren England

8 January 2017 Third round	Chelsea	4–1	Peterborough United	Fulham, London
15:00 GMT	Pedro 18', 75'; Fàbregas (yellow card) 24'; Batshuayi 43'; Willian 52'; Terry (red card) 67'	Report	Forrester (yellow card) 23'; Tafazolli (yellow card) 33'; Nichols 70'	Stadium: Stamford Bridge; Attendance: 41,003; Referee: Kevin Friend

=== EFL Cup ===
9 August 2016 First round	Peterborough United	3–2	AFC Wimbledon	Peterborough
19:45 BST	Nichols 64', 90+3'; P. Taylor 68'	Report	Whelpdale 34'; L. Taylor 78'	Stadium: London Road Stadium; Attendance: 2,850; Referee: Ollie Yates

23 August 2016 Second round	Peterborough United	1–3	Swansea City	Peterborough
19:45 BST	Da Silva Lopes 75'	Report	Fulton 15'; McBurnie 41', 44'	Stadium: London Road Stadium; Attendance: 4,727; Referee: James Adcock

=== EFL Trophy ===
Pos	Div	Team	Pld	W	PW	PL	L	GF	GA	GD	Pts	Qualification
1	ACA	Norwich City U21	3	3	0	0	0	15	2	+13	9	Advance to Round 2
2	L1	Milton Keynes Dons	3	1	1	0	1	4	6	−2	5	Advance to Round 2
3	L1	Peterborough United	3	1	0	0	2	3	8	−5	3	
4	L2	Barnet	3	0	0	1	2	3	9	−6	1	

Source: Sky Sports

30 August 2016 Group stage 1	Peterborough United	1–6	Norwich City U23	Peterborough
19:30 BST	Anderson 52'; Maddison (yellow card) 63'		Murphy 6', 82'; Andreu 8', 45+2', 56'; Maddison 23'; Morris (yellow card) 49'; Grant (yellow card) 58'	Stadium: London Road Stadium

4 October 2016 Group stage 2	Peterborough United	0–1	Milton Keynes Dons	Peterborough
19:30 BST	Oduwa (yellow card) 78'	Report	Agard 40'; Rasulo (yellow card) 90+3'; Carruthers (yellow card) 90+4'	Stadium: ABAX Stadium; Attendance: 1,793

8 November 2016 Group stage 3	Barnet	1–2	Peterborough United	Canons Park, London
20:00 GMT	Amaluzor 68'	Report	Taylor 6'; Moncur 84'	Stadium: The Hive Stadium; Attendance: 393; Referee: Andy Woolmer
