= Luke Hallett =

English footballer

Luke James Hallett
Personal information
- Full name: Luke James Hallett
- Date of birth: 9 October 2002 (age 24)
- Place of birth: Southampton, England
- Position: Defender

Team information
- Current team: Forest Green Rovers
- Number: 29

Youth career
- –2021: Forest Green Rovers

Senior career*
Years	Team	Apps	(Gls)
2021–	Forest Green Rovers	1	(0)
2021–2022	→ Gosport Borough (loan)	33	(5)
- * Club domestic league appearances and goals as of 16:54, 17 May 2022 (UTC)

Luke James Hallett (born 9 October 2002) is an English footballer who plays as a defender for National League club Forest Green Rovers.

== Career ==
Born in Southampton, Hallett progressed through the youth academy at Forest Green Rovers, and made his first-team debut as a substitute in a 3–0 defeat to Stevenage on 2 March 2021. In May 2021, he signed a professional contract for the 2021–22 season.

In August 2021, Hallett joined Southern League Premier Division South club Gosport Borough on loan. On 9 January 2022, his loan was extended until the end of the season. He scored 6 goals in 37 matches in all competitions.

== Career statistics ==
As of end of 2021–22 season

Appearances and goals by club, season and competition
Club	Season	League			FA Cup		EFL Cup		Other		Total	
Club	Season	Division	Apps	Goals	Apps	Goals	Apps	Goals	Apps	Goals	Apps	Goals
Forest Green Rovers	2020–21	League Two	1	0	0	0	0	0	0	0	1	0
Forest Green Rovers	2021–22	League Two	0	0	0	0	0	0	0	0	0	0
Forest Green Rovers	Total		1	0	0	0	0	0	0	0	1	0
Gosport Borough (loan)	2021–22	Southern League Premier Division South	33	5	2	0	—		2 (Note: 1 appearance in FA Trophy, 1 appearance and 1 goal in Portsmouth Senior Cup.)	1	37	6
Career total			34	5	2	0	0	0	2	1	38	6
