= 2021–22 Forest Green Rovers F.C. season =

Forest Green Rovers
2021–22 season
- Chairman: Dale Vince
- Head Coach: Rob Edwards
- Stadium: The New Lawn
- League Two: 1st (promoted)
- FA Cup: First round
- EFL Cup: Second round
- EFL Trophy: Second round
- Top goalscorer: League: Matty Stevens (23); All: Matty Stevens (27)
- Biggest win: 4–0 at Stevenage
Home colours	Away colours	Third colours

The 2021–22 season was Forest Green Rovers' 133rd year in their history and fifth consecutive season in League Two. Along with the league, the club also competed in the FA Cup, the EFL Cup and the EFL Trophy. The season covers the period from 1 July 2021 to 30 June 2022.

During pre-season, FGR announced Rob Edwards as their head coach.

== Pre-season friendlies ==
FGR announced they will have friendlies against Melksham Town, Yate Town, Cardiff City, Leamington, Swansea City and Yeovil Town as part of their pre-season preparations.

13 July 2021 Friendly	Melksham Town	0–6	Forest Green Rovers	Melksham
19:45 BST		Report	Cargill 17'; Matt 40' (pen.); Allen 52'; Stevens 72' (pen.), 78'; Young 90+1'	Stadium: Oakfield Stadium

17 July 2021 Friendly	Yate Town	0–2	Forest Green Rovers	Yate
13:00 BST		Report	Stevens 19'; Edwards 30'	Stadium: Lodge Road

20 July 2021 Friendly	Forest Green Rovers	1–2	Cardiff City	Nailsworth
19:00 BST	Matt 58'		Collins 47'; McGuinness 84'	Stadium: The New Lawn

24 July 2021 Friendly	Leamington	0–0	Forest Green Rovers	Leamington Spa
13:00 BST		Report		Stadium: New Windmill Ground

28 July 2021 Friendly	Forest Green Rovers	1–2	Swansea City	Nailsworth
19:00 BST	Stevens 86' (pen.)	Report	Dhanda 65'; Lloyd 70'	Stadium: The New Lawn

31 July 2021 Friendly	Yeovil Town	0–1	Forest Green Rovers	Yeovil
15:00 BST		Report	Matt (?)	Stadium: Huish Park

== Competitions ==
=== League Two ===
==== League table ====
Pos	Team	Pld	W	D	L	GF	GA	GD	Pts	Promotion, qualification or relegation
1	Forest Green Rovers (C, P)	46	23	15	8	75	44	+31	84	Promotion to EFL League One
2	Exeter City (P)	46	23	15	8	65	41	+24	84	Promotion to EFL League One
3	Bristol Rovers (P)	46	23	11	12	71	49	+22	80	Promotion to EFL League One
4	Northampton Town	46	23	11	12	60	38	+22	80	Qualification for League Two play-offs
5	Port Vale (O, P)	46	22	12	12	67	46	+21	78	Qualification for League Two play-offs
6	Swindon Town	46	22	11	13	77	54	+23	77	Qualification for League Two play-offs

Source: EFL Official Website
Rules for classification: 1) Points; 2) Goal difference; 3) Number of goals scored; 4) Head-to-head results; 5) Wins; 6) Away goals; 7) Penalty points (sec 9.5); 8) 12-point sending off offences
(C) Champions; (O) Play-off winners; (P) Promoted

==== Results summary ====
Overall								Home						Away					
Pld	W	D	L	GF	GA	GD	Pts	W	D	L	GF	GA	GD	W	D	L	GF	GA	GD
46	23	15	8	75	44	+31	84	14	4	5	34	18	+16	9	11	3	41	26	+15

Last updated: 7 May 2022.

==== Results by matchday ====
Matchday	1	2	3	4	5	6	7	8	9	10	11	12	13	14	15	16	17	18	19	20	21	22	23	24	25	26	27	28	29	30	31	32	33	34	35	36	37	38	39	40	41	42	43	44	45	46
Ground	H	A	A	H	H	A	H	A	H	A	H	A	H	H	A	A	H	H	A	A	H	H	H	A	H	A	A	H	H	A	H	A	A	A	H	H	A	H	H	H	A	H	A	A	H	A
Result	W	W	W	W	L	D	W	W	D	W	L	W	D	W	D	W	W	W	W	D	W	D	W	D	W	W	D	W	W	D	L	L	D	D	L	D	W	W	W	D	L	W	D	L	L	D
Position	3	1	1	1	1	2	1	1	1	1	1	1	1	1	1	1	1	1	1	1	1	1	1	1	1	1	1	1	1	1	1	1	1	1	1	1	1	1	1	1	1	1	1	1	2	1

Updated to match(es) played on 7 May 2022. Source: Statto.com
A = Away; H = Home; W = Win; D = Draw; L = Loss

==== Matches ====
FGR's fixtures were released on 24 June 2021.

7 August 2021 1	Forest Green Rovers	2–1	Sutton United	Nailsworth
15:00 BST	Bernard (yellow card) 20'; Moore-Taylor (yellow card) 26'; Stevens 30'; Adams 90+1'; Matt (yellow card) 90+4'	Report	Bugiel 69'	Stadium: The New Lawn; Attendance: 1,883; Referee: James Bell

14 August 2021 2	Walsall	1–3	Forest Green Rovers	Bescot
15:00 BST	Wilkinson (yellow card) 77'; Kiernan 90+2'	Report	Stevens 20', 45+3' (pen.); Bernard (yellow card) 31'; Cadden (yellow card) 31'; Matt 43'; Hendry (yellow card) 45'	Stadium: Bescot Stadium; Attendance: 4,320; Referee: Simon Mather

17 August 2021 3	Rochdale	1–2	Forest Green Rovers	Rochdale
19:45 BST	O'Keeffe (yellow card) 22'; Newby 48'	Report	Matt 33'; Stevens 49'	Stadium: Spotland; Attendance: 2,188; Referee: Andy Haines

21 August 2021 4	Forest Green Rovers	6–3	Crawley Town	Nailsworth
15:00 BST	Cadden 1', 67', 69'; Stevens 24'; Matt 48'; Adams (yellow card) 59'; Young 78'	Report	Hessenthaler 14', 30'; Craig (yellow card) 27'; Appiah 86', (yellow card) 90'	Stadium: The New Lawn; Attendance: 1,922; Referee: Leigh Doughty

28 August 2021 5	Forest Green Rovers	0–2	Port Vale	Nailsworth
15:00 BST		Report	Proctor 6', 9', (yellow card) 14'; Walker (yellow card) 42'; Rodney (yellow card) 83'	Stadium: The New Lawn; Attendance: 2,402; Referee: Charles Breakspear

4 September 2021 6	Exeter City	0–0	Forest Green Rovers	Exeter
15:00 BST	Ray (yellow card) 41'	Report		Stadium: St James Park; Attendance: 4,008; Referee: Neil Hair

11 September 2021 7	Forest Green Rovers	1–0	Northampton Town	Nailsworth
15:00 BST	Wilson (yellow card) 43'; Matt 77'	Report	McGowan (yellow card) 21'; Lewis (yellow card) 75'	Stadium: The New Lawn; Attendance: 2,576; Referee: Scott Oldham

18 September 2021 8	Stevenage	0–4	Forest Green Rovers	Stevenage
15:00 BST	Reeves (yellow card) 53'; Coker (yellow card) 59'	Report	Wilson 2'; Sweeney (yellow card) 43'; Hendry (yellow card) 45+1'; Stevens 50'; McGee (yellow card) 54'; Matt 58'; Stevenson (yellow card) 71'; Young 81'	Stadium: Broadhall Way; Attendance: 3,111; Referee: Sam Allison

25 September 2021 9	Forest Green Rovers	0–0	Tranmere Rovers	Nailsworth
15:00 BST	Aitchison (yellow card) 27'; Bernard (yellow card) 76'; Hendry (yellow card) 90'	Report	Hawkes (yellow card) 8'; Foley (yellow card) 25'; MacDonald (yellow card) 80' (yellow-red card) 87'	Stadium: The innocent New Lawn; Attendance: 2,356; Referee: David Rock

2 October 2021 10	Carlisle United	0–2	Forest Green Rovers	Carlisle
15:00 BST	Dickenson (yellow card) 45+2'; Abrahams (yellow card) 90+1'	Report	Matt 29'; Cadden 32'; Hendry (yellow card) 60'	Stadium: Brunton Park; Attendance: 3,963; Referee: Sam Barrott

9 October 2021 11	Forest Green Rovers	0–2	Swindon Town	Nailsworth
12:00 BST	Sweeney (yellow card) 45+1'; Matt (yellow card) 45+2'; March (penalty missed) 90+4'	Report	McKirdy 54', (yellow card) 66'; Simpson 81'	Stadium: The New Lawn; Attendance: 3,442; Referee: Paul Howard

16 October 2021 12	Scunthorpe United	0–2	Forest Green Rovers	Scunthorpe
15:00 BST	Davis (yellow card) 31'; Scrimshaw (yellow card) 58'; Rowe (yellow card) 59'; Jarvis (yellow card) 90+1'; Pugh (yellow card) 90+9'	Report	Young (yellow card) 47'; Adams (yellow card) 54', (goal) 65'; Matt 60' (pen.), (yellow card) 82'; Moore-Taylor (yellow card) 90+1'; Cargill (yellow card) 90+10'	Stadium: Glanford Park; Attendance: 2,140; Referee: Declan Bourne

19 October 2021 13	Leyton Orient	1–1	Forest Green Rovers	Leyton
19:45 GMT	Pratley (yellow card) 62'; Sotirou 76'	Report	Adams (yellow card) 45+3'; Stevens 68'	Stadium: Brisbane Road; Attendance: 4,391; Referee: Christopher Pollard

24 October 2021 14	Forest Green Rovers	3–1	Salford City	Nailsworth
15:00 BST	Moore-Taylor (yellow card) 8'; Cadden 45+1'; Wilson 71'; Aitchison 90+3'	Report	Touray (yellow card) 15'; Thomas-Asante 17'; Elliott (yellow card) 35'; Lund (yellow card) 43'	Stadium: The New Lawn; Attendance: 2,245; Referee: Andy Woolmer

30 October 2021 15	Bradford City	1–1	Forest Green Rovers	Bradford
15:00 BST	Cook 10'; O'Donnell (yellow card) 54'; Gilliead (yellow card) 79'; Threlkeld (yellow card) 85'	Report	Godwin-Malife (yellow card) 38'; Cargill (yellow card) 45+2'; Young 54'; Adams (yellow card) 61'	Stadium: Valley Parade; Attendance: 14,873; Referee: Marc Edwards

20 November 2021 16	Hartlepool United	1–3	Forest Green Rovers	Hartlepool
15:00 GMT	Daly (yellow card) 71'; Featherstone 80' (pen.); Liddle (yellow card) 84'; Sterry (red card) 87'; Byrne (yellow card) 89'	Report	Moore-Taylor 4'; Matt 29'; Stevens (yellow card) 36', (goal) 45+1'; March (yellow card) 89'	Stadium: Victoria Park; Attendance: 5,612; Referee: Steve Martin

23 November 2021 17	Forest Green Rovers	2–0	Barrow	Nailsworth
19:45 GMT	Stevens 61', 83'	Report	Kay (yellow card) 28'; Brough (yellow card) 57'	Stadium: The New Lawn; Attendance: 1,842; Referee: Chris Sarginson

27 November 2021 18	Forest Green Rovers	2–0	Bristol Rovers	Nailsworth
15:00 GMT	Matt 20', 77' (pen.), (yellow card) 81'; Godwin-Malife (yellow card) 41' (yellow-red card) 63'	Report	Anderton (yellow card) 28'; Evans (yellow card) 79'; Finley (yellow card) 80'	Stadium: The New Lawn; Attendance: 4,128; Referee: Simon Mather

7 December 2021 19	Harrogate Town	1–4	Forest Green Rovers	Harrogate
19:45 GMT	Falkingham (yellow card) 37'; Kerry 57', (yellow card) 88'	Report	Aitchison 21'; Cadden 26'; Matt 45'; Stevens 73'	Stadium: Wetherby Road; Attendance: 1,619; Referee: Martin Coy

11 December 2021 20	Oldham Athletic	5–5	Forest Green Rovers	Oldham
15:00 GMT	Keillor-Dunn 11', 59'; Bowden (yellow card) 47'; Hope 55'; Stobbs 65', (yellow card) 90+6'; Clarke (yellow card) 71'; Wilson 78' (o.g.)	Report	Aitchison 13'; Matt 27', 44'; Stevens 48', 63'	Stadium: Boundary Park; Attendance: 3,621; Referee: Andrew Kitchen

1 January 2022 21	Forest Green Rovers	2–0	Stevenage	Nailsworth
15:00 GMT	Cadden (yellow card) 19'; March 57'; Matt 64'	Report	Lines (yellow card) 13'	Stadium: The New Lawn; Attendance: 2,454; Referee: Neil Hair

4 January 2022 22	Forest Green Rovers	0–0	Exeter City	Nailsworth
19:45 GMT	Cadden (yellow card) 32'; Wilson (yellow card) 53'; Stevenson (yellow card) 87'	Report	Collins (yellow card) 28'	Stadium: The New Lawn; Attendance: 2,631; Referee: Andy Davies

11 January 2022 23	Forest Green Rovers	2–0	Colchester United	Nailsworth
19:45 GMT	Matt 15'; Stevenson (yellow card) 44'; March 90+2'	Report	Sarpong-Wiredu (yellow card) 32'	Stadium: The New Lawn; Attendance: 1,829; Referee: Ben Speedie

15 January 2022 24	Northampton Town	1–1	Forest Green Rovers	Sixfields
15:00 GMT	Sowerby (yellow card) 45'; Lewis (yellow card) 51'; Horsfall (yellow card) 64'; Pinnock 90+5', (yellow card) 90+6'	Report	Stevens 70'; Wilson (yellow card) 80'	Stadium: Sixfields Stadium; Attendance: 5,415; Referee: Marc Edwards

22 January 2022 25	Forest Green Rovers	3–0	Carlisle United	Nailsworth
15:00 GMT	Feeney 16' (o.g.); Cargill (yellow card) 35'; Stevens 52'; Matt 77'	Report	Armer (yellow card) 62'; Guy (yellow card) 90+1'	Stadium: The New Lawn; Attendance: 2,864; Referee: Craig Hicks

29 January 2022 26	Tranmere Rovers	0–4	Forest Green Rovers	Birkenhead
15:00 GMT	Clarke (yellow card) 90+7'	Report	Stevens 6'; Matt 42'; Moore-Taylor 53'; Hendry 70'	Stadium: Prenton Park; Attendance: 10,924; Referee: Lee Swabey

1 February 2022 27	Port Vale	1–1	Forest Green Rovers	Burslem
19:45 GMT	Edmondson 12'	Report	Stevens 80'	Stadium: Vale Park; Attendance: 4,508; Referee: Tom Reeves

5 February 2022 28	Forest Green Rovers	2–0	Newport County	Nailsworth
15:00 GMT	Stevens 33', 61'	Report	Pask (yellow card) 39'; Cain (yellow card) 64'; Street (yellow card) 68'	Stadium: The New Lawn; Attendance: 3,817; Referee: David Rock

8 February 2022 29	Forest Green Rovers	2–1	Rochdale	Nailsworth
19:45 GMT	Cargill (yellow card) 61'; Aitchison 73'; Stevens 86'	Report	Ball 47'; Campbell (yellow card) 64'	Stadium: The New Lawn; Attendance: 1,923; Referee: Paul Howard

12 February 2022 30	Sutton United	1–1	Forest Green Rovers	Sutton
15:00 GMT	Davis 37'; Ajiboye (yellow card) 74'	Report	Wilson 60'	Stadium: Gander Green Lane; Attendance: 3,314; Referee: James Bell

19 February 2022 31	Forest Green Rovers	0–1	Walsall	Nailsworth
15:00 GMT	Adams (yellow card) 17'; Cargill (yellow card) 81'; Cadden (yellow card) 90'	Report	Miller 12'; Kinsella (yellow card) 21'; Menayese (yellow card) 45+1'	Stadium: The New Lawn; Attendance: 3,122; Referee: Alan Young

26 February 2022 32	Crawley Town	2–1	Forest Green Rovers	Crawley
15:00 GMT	Nadesan 24'; Craig (yellow card) 30'; Tunnicliffe 32'; Francomb (yellow card) 72'; Powell (yellow card) 77'; Morris (yellow card) 85'	Report	Bernard 80'; Sweeney (yellow card) 90'; Adams (yellow card) 90+4'	Stadium: Broadfield Stadium; Attendance: 2,086; Referee: Christopher Pollard

1 March 2022 33	Newport County	1–1	Forest Green Rovers	Newport
19:45 GMT	Azaz 3'; Lewis (yellow card) 32'; Bennett (yellow card) 38'; Cooper (yellow card) 46'; Clarke (yellow card) 69' (yellow-red card) 84'; Street (yellow card) 84'	Report	Matt (yellow card) 38'; Aitchison 55'	Stadium: Rodney Parade; Attendance: 4,448; Referee: Charles Breakspear

5 March 2022 34	Salford City	1–1	Forest Green Rovers	Salford
15:00 GMT	Smith 7'; Vassell (yellow card) 48'; Turnbull (yellow card) 63'	Report	Stevens 53'; Matt (yellow card) 63'; Adams (yellow card) 71'	Stadium: Moor Lane; Attendance: 1,987; Referee: Declan Bourne

12 March 2022 35	Forest Green Rovers	0–2	Bradford City	Nailsworth
15:00 GMT	Godwin-Malife (yellow card) 65' (yellow-red card) 76'	Report	Cooke 64' Cook 90+5' Evans (yellow card) 81'	Stadium: The New Lawn; Attendance: 3,339; Referee: Ollie Yates

15 March 2022 36	Forest Green Rovers	1–1	Leyton Orient	Nailsworth
19:45 GMT	Stevens 10'; Adams (yellow card) 58'; Hendry (yellow card) 63'	Report	Sotiriou 67'; Wood (yellow card) 81'	Stadium: The New Lawn; Attendance: 1,891; Referee: Trevor Kettle

21 March 2022 37	Colchester United	0–1	Forest Green Rovers	Colchester
19:45 GMT	Coxe (yellow card) 65'	Report	Stevens 9'	Stadium: Colchester Community Stadium; Attendance: 6,140; Referee: Andy Woolmer

2 April 2022 38	Forest Green Rovers	1–0	Scunthorpe United	Nailsworth
15:00 BST	Stevenson (yellow card) 67'; Sweeney 75'	Report	Hackney (yellow card) 24'; Rowe (yellow card) 53'	Stadium: The New Lawn; Attendance: 2,484; Referee: Sam Allison

5 April 2022 39	Forest Green Rovers	1–0	Mansfield Town	Nailsworth
19:45 BST	March 14'; Matt (yellow card) 39'; Wilson (yellow card) 79'; Adams (yellow card) 84'	Report	Hawkins (yellow card) 11'; Wallace (yellow card) 38'; Lapslie (red card) 49'; Hewitt (yellow card) 90'	Stadium: The New Lawn; Attendance: 2,784; Referee: Carl Brook

9 April 2022 40	Forest Green Rovers	1–1	Hartlepool United	Nailsworth
15:00 BST	Hendry 53'; Aitchison (yellow card) 75'	Report	Morris (yellow card) 66'; Bogle 68'	Stadium: The New Lawn; Attendance: 3,023; Referee: Sam Purkiss

15 April 2022 41	Barrow	4–0	Forest Green Rovers	Barrow-in-Furness
15:00 BST	Grayson 5'; Rooney 38'; Gotts (yellow card) 43'; Platt 53'; Gordon (yellow card) 70'; Amadi-Holloway (yellow card) 74', (goal) 90+2'	Report	Cadden (yellow card) 28'; March (yellow card) 36'; Adams (yellow card) 75'	Stadium: Holker Street; Attendance: 3,098; Referee: Seb Stockbridge

18 April 2022 42	Forest Green Rovers	2–0	Oldham Athletic	Nailsworth
15:00 BST	Hendry 8'; Matt 41'; Adams (yellow card) 79'	Report	Hopcutt (yellow card) 28'; Sutton (yellow card) 37'; Whelan (yellow card) 73'; Missilou (penalty missed) 80'	Stadium: The New Lawn; Attendance: 3,137; Referee: Steve Martin

23 April 2022 43	Bristol Rovers	0–0	Forest Green Rovers	Horfield
15:00 BST	Finley (yellow card) 51'; Evans (yellow card) 64'; Anderson (yellow card) 74'; Collins (yellow card) 90+1'; Taylor (yellow card) 90+4'	Report	Adams (yellow card) 19'; Stevenson (yellow card) 22'; Hendry (yellow card) 57'; McGee (yellow card) 77'	Stadium: Memorial Stadium; Attendance: 9,690; Referee: Gavin Ward

26 April 2022 44	Swindon Town	2–1	Forest Green Rovers	Swindon
19:45 BST	Barry 15'; Iandolo (yellow card) 36' (yellow-red card) 53'; Payne 40', (yellow card) 90+2'; Williams (yellow card) 53'; McKirdy (yellow card) 85'	Report	Godwin-Malife (yellow card) 13'; Adams (yellow card) 59'; March (yellow card) 63', (goal) 69'; Young (yellow card) 82'	Stadium: The County Ground; Attendance: 11,150; Referee: James Oldham

30 April 2022 45	Forest Green Rovers	1–3	Harrogate Town	Nailsworth
15:00 BST	McGee (yellow card) 39'; Matt 45+3' (pen.)	Report	Muldoon 40' (pen.); Diamond 46'; Thomson (yellow card) 54'; Kerry 72'	Stadium: The New Lawn; Attendance: 4,040; Referee: Peter Wright

7 May 2022 46	Mansfield Town	2–2	Forest Green Rovers	Mansfield
15:00 BST	Longstaff 17'; McLaughlin (yellow card) 37'; Bowery 78'	Report	Adams 64'; March 80', (yellow card) 81'	Stadium: Field Mill; Attendance: 7,374; Referee: Bobby Madley

=== FA Cup ===
Rovers were drawn away to Corinthian Casuals or St Albans City in the first round.

7 November 2021 First round	St Albans City	3–2	Forest Green Rovers	St Albans
17:15 GMT	Diedhiou (yellow card) 5'; Weiss 25'; Banton 29'; Jeffers 78'	Report	Stevens 18'; Aitchison 45+1'; Young (yellow card) 63'; Adams (yellow card) 90'	Stadium: Clarence Park; Attendance: 4,100; Referee: Bobby Madley

=== EFL Cup ===
Forest Green were drawn at home to Bristol City in the first round and away to Brentford in the second round.

10 August 2021 First round	Forest Green Rovers	2–2 (6–5 p)	Bristol City	Nailsworth
19:45 BST	Matt 11'; Godwin-Malife (yellow card) 45'; Sweeney (yellow card) 51'; Adams (yellow card) 89'; Hendry 90+6'	Report	Janneh 39', 67'; Wells (yellow card) 44'; Simpson (yellow card) 69'	Stadium: The New Lawn; Attendance: 2,554; Referee: Darren Drysdale
	Penalties
	Matt (penalty missed); Young (penalty scored); Hendry (penalty scored); Adams (penalty scored); Cadden (penalty scored); Stevenson (penalty scored); Sweeney (penalty scored)		Palmer (penalty missed); Massengo (penalty scored); Wells (penalty scored); Conway (penalty scored); Bakinson (penalty scored); Janneh (penalty scored); Pring (penalty missed)

24 August 2021 Second round	Brentford	3–1	Forest Green Rovers	Brentford
19:45 BST	Wissa 60'; Mbeumo 75'; Forss 86'	Report	Aitchison 8'; Adams (red card) 80'	Stadium: Brentford Community Stadium; Attendance: 12,137; Referee: Will Finnie

=== EFL Trophy ===
Pos	Div	Team	Pld	W	PW	PL	L	GF	GA	GD	Pts	Qualification
1	L2	Forest Green Rovers	3	1	1	1	0	5	3	+2	6	Advance to Round 2
2	L2	Walsall	3	1	1	0	1	2	3	−1	5	Advance to Round 2
3	ACA	Brighton & Hove Albion U21	3	1	0	1	1	4	4	0	4	
4	L2	Northampton Town	3	0	1	1	1	3	4	−1	3	

Source: EFL.com

31 August 2021 Group game 1	Forest Green Rovers	1–1 (2–4 p)	Northampton Town	Nailsworth
19:00 BST	Harriman 14' (o.g.)	Report	Flores (yellow card) 26'; Pollock 51', (yellow card) 73'; Harriman (yellow card) 79'	Stadium: The New Lawn; Attendance: 892; Referee: Christopher Pollard
	Penalties
	Stevens (penalty scored); Evans (penalty missed); Matt (penalty missed); Adams (penalty scored)		Rose (penalty scored); Kabamba (penalty scored); Connolly (penalty scored); McWilliams (penalty missed); Pollock (penalty scored)

12 October 2021 Group game 2	Forest Green Rovers	2–2 (5–3 p)	Brighton & Hove Albion U21	Nailsworth
19:00 BST	Stevens 27' (pen.), 56'; Edwards (yellow card) 72'	Report	Miller 34'; Tsoungui (red card) 47'; Tolaj 63'; Leonard (yellow card) 90+5'	Stadium: The New Lawn; Attendance: 604; Referee: Antony Coggins
	Penalties
	Cargill (penalty scored); March (penalty scored); Edwards (penalty scored); Aitchison (penalty scored); Young (penalty scored)		Leonard (penalty missed); Spong (penalty scored); Tolaj (penalty scored); Peupion (penalty scored)

9 November 2021 Group game 3	Walsall	0–2	Forest Green Rovers	Bescot
19:00 GMT	Khan (yellow card) 60'; Labadie (yellow card) 82'; Menayese (yellow card) 86'	Report	Stevens 15'; Bunker (yellow card) 36'; Evans (yellow card) 77'; Hendry (yellow card) 81'; Young 88'	Stadium: Bescot Stadium; Attendance: 1,778; Referee: Tom Reeves

30 November 2021 Second round	Forest Green Rovers	1–1 (1–4 p)	Chelsea U21	Nailsworth
19:00 GMT	March 64'	Report	McEachran (yellow card) 52'; Uwakwe 65'; Hall (yellow card) 90+2'	Stadium: The New Lawn; Attendance: 1,270; Referee: Ollie Yates
	Penalties
	Stevens (penalty missed); Bunker (penalty missed); March (penalty scored)		Baker (penalty scored); Nunn (penalty scored); Mbuyamba (penalty scored); Hall (penalty scored)

== Transfers ==
=== Transfers in ===
Date	Position	Nationality	Name	From	Fee	Ref.
1 July 2021	RM	(Ghana)	Opi Edwards	(England) Bristol City	Free transfer	
1 July 2021	AM	(Scotland)	Regan Hendry	(Scotland) Raith Rovers	Free transfer	
1 July 2021	CM	(England)	Ben Stevenson	(England) Colchester United	Free transfer	
2 July 2021	DM	(England)	Sadou Diallo	(England) Wolverhampton Wanderers	Free transfer	

=== Loans in ===
Date from	Position	Nationality	Name	From	Date until	Ref.
2 July 2021	CF	(Scotland)	Jack Aitchison	(England) Barnsley	End of season	
28 January 2022	AM	(England)	Kasey McAteer	(England) Leicester City	End of season	

=== Loans out ===
Date from	Position	Nationality	Name	To	Date until	Ref.
30 July 2021	CM	(England)	Harvey Bunker	(England) Chippenham Town	9 November 2021	
8 December 2021	DF	(England)	Marcel McIntosh	(England) Cinderford Town	January 2022	
13 January 2022	DF	(England)	Jack Evans	(England) Fylde	End of season	
15 February 2022	CM	(England)	Harvey Bunker	(England) Weymouth		

=== Transfers out ===
Date	Position	Nationality	Name	To	Fee	Ref.
30 June 2021	CF	(Wales)	Aaron Collins	(England) Bristol Rovers	Free transfer	
30 June 2021	CF	(England)	Shawn McCoulsky	(England) Colchester United	Released	
30 June 2021	GK	(England)	Adam Smith	(England) Stevenage	Released	
30 June 2021	LB	(England)	Chris Stokes	(Scotland) Kilmarnock	Released	
30 June 2021	RM	(England)	Scott Wagstaff	(England) Aldershot Town	Released	
20 August 2021	AM	(England)	Dylan Morgan	(Wales) Swansea City	Free transfer	

== Statistics ==
=== Appearances and goals ===
Last updated 7 May 2022.

No.	Pos	Nat	Player	Total		EFL League Two		EFL Cup		EFL Trophy		FA Cup	
No.	Pos	Nat	Player	Apps	Goals	Apps	Goals	Apps	Goals	Apps	Goals	Apps	Goals
Goalkeepers
1	GK	(England) ENG	Luke McGee	48	0	46+0	0	0	0	1+0	0	1+0	0
24	GK	(Wales) WAL	Lewis Thomas	5	0	0	0	2+0	0	3+0	0	0	0
Defenders
2	DF	(England) ENG	Kane Wilson	48	3	45+0	3	1+1	0	0	0	1+0	0
3	DF	(Republic of Ireland) IRL	Dom Bernard	38	1	29+4	1	1+1	0	3+0	0	0	0
6	DF	(England) ENG	Baily Cargill	40	0	33+4	0	1+0	0	2+0	0	0	0
15	DF	(England) ENG	Jordan Moore-Taylor	44	2	40+0	2	2+0	0	1+0	0	1+0	0
16	DF	(England) ENG	Jack Evans	4	0	0	0	0	0	4+0	0	0	0
22	DF	(England) ENG	Udoka Godwin-Malife	30	0	22+4	0	1+0	0	1+1	0	1+0	0
29	DF	(England) ENG	Luke Hallett	0	0	0	0	0	0	0	0	0	0
44	DF	(England) ENG	Murphy Bennett	1	0	0	0	0	0	0+1	0	0	0
Midfielders
4	MF	(England) ENG	Dan Sweeney	38	1	20+15	1	1+0	0	2+0	0	0	0
7	MF	(England) ENG	Ben Stevenson	44	0	39+2	0	0+1	0	1+0	0	1+0	0
8	MF	(The Gambia) GAM	Ebou Adams	41	3	33+4	3	2+0	0	1+0	0	1+0	0
11	MF	(Scotland) SCO	Nicky Cadden	48	6	44+0	6	2+0	0	0+1	0	1+0	0
12	MF	(England) ENG	Taylor Allen	9	0	2+2	0	0+1	0	4+0	0	0	0
17	MF	(Ghana) GHA	Opi Edwards	5	0	0	0	1+0	0	4+0	0	0	0
20	MF	(England) ENG	Elliott Whitehouse	0	0	0	0	0	0	0	0	0	0
21	MF	(Scotland) SCO	Regan Hendry	35	4	29+2	3	2+0	1	2+0	0	0	0
23	MF	(England) ENG	Sadou Diallo	16	0	3+6	0	2+0	0	4+0	0	0+1	0
25	MF	(England) ENG	Kasey McAteer	9	0	0+9	0	0	0	0	0	0	0
26	MF	(United States) USA	Vaughn Covil	0	0	0	0	0	0	0	0	0	0
27	MF	(England) ENG	Harvey Bunker	2	0	0	0	0	0	2+0	0	0	0
40	MF	(England) ENG	Finn Bell	1	0	0	0	0	0	0+1	0	0	0
41	MF	(England) ENG	Marcel McIntosh	1	0	0	0	0	0	1+0	0	0	0
Forwards
9	FW	(England) ENG	Matty Stevens	42	27	35+2	23	0	0	2+2	3	1+0	1
10	FW	(Scotland) SCO	Jack Aitchison	53	7	32+14	5	2+0	1	1+3	0	1+0	1
14	FW	(Jamaica) JAM	Jamille Matt	49	20	46+0	19	1+1	1	0+1	0	0	0
18	FW	(England) ENG	Jake Young	29	4	2+20	3	1+1	0	3+1	1	1+0	0
28	FW	(England) ENG	Josh March	40	6	7+28	5	0+1	0	3+0	1	1+0	0

=== Top scorers ===
Includes all competitive matches. The list is sorted by squad number when total goals are equal.

Last updated 7 May 2022.

Rank	Position	Nationality	No.	Player	EFL League Two	EFL Cup	EFL Trophy	FA Cup	Total
1	FW	(England)	9	Matty Stevens	23	0	3	1	27
2	FW	(Jamaica)	14	Jamille Matt	19	1	0	0	20
3	FW	(Scotland)	10	Jack Aitchison	5	1	0	1	7
4	MF	(Scotland)	11	Nicky Cadden	6	0	0	0	6
4	FW	(England)	28	Josh March	5	0	1	0	6
6	FW	(England)	18	Jake Young	3	0	1	0	4
6	MF	(Scotland)	21	Regan Hendry	3	1	0	0	4
8	DF	(England)	2	Kane Wilson	3	0	0	0	3
8	MF	(The Gambia)	8	Ebou Adams	3	0	0	0	3
10	DF	(England)	15	Jordan Moore-Taylor	2	0	0	0	2
11	DF	(England)	3	Dom Bernard	1	0	0	0	1
11	MF	(England)	4	Dan Sweeney	1	0	0	0	1
	Own goals				1	0	1	0	2
	TOTALS				75	3	6	2	86

=== Cleansheets ===
Includes all competitive matches. The list is sorted by squad number when total cleansheets are equal.

Last updated 7 May 2022.

Rank	Position	Nationality	No.	Player	EFL League Two	EFL Cup	EFL Trophy	FA Cup	Total
1
1	GK	(England)	1	Luke McGee	18	0	1	0	19
2
2	GK	(Wales)	24	Lewis Thomas	0	0	0	0	0
TOTALS					18	0	1	0	19

=== Disciplinary record ===
Includes all competitive matches.

Last updated 7 May 2022.

Position	Nationality	Number	Name	League Two			EFL Cup			EFL Trophy			FA Cup			Total		
Position	Nationality	Number	Name	Booked	(yellow card) (yellow-red card)	Sent off (straight red)	Booked	(yellow card) (yellow-red card)	Sent off (straight red)	Booked	(yellow card) (yellow-red card)	Sent off (straight red)	Booked	(yellow card) (yellow-red card)	Sent off (straight red)	Booked	(yellow card) (yellow-red card)	Sent off (straight red)
DF	(England)	22	Udoka Godwin-Malife	3	2	0	1	0	0	0	0	0	0	0	0	4	2	0
MF	(The Gambia)	8	Ebou Adams	13	0	0	1	0	1	0	0	0	1	0	0	15	0	1
FW	(Jamaica)	14	Jamille Matt	7	0	0	0	0	0	0	0	0	0	0	0	7	0	0
MF	(Scotland)	21	Regan Hendry	6	0	0	0	0	0	1	0	0	0	0	0	7	0	0
DF	(England)	6	Baily Cargill	5	0	0	0	0	0	0	0	0	0	0	0	5	0	0
MF	(England)	7	Ben Stevenson	5	0	0	0	0	0	0	0	0	0	0	0	5	0	0
MF	(Scotland)	11	Nicky Cadden	5	0	0	0	0	0	0	0	0	0	0	0	5	0	0
DF	(England)	2	Kane Wilson	4	0	0	0	0	0	0	0	0	0	0	0	4	0	0
MF	(England)	4	Dan Sweeney	3	0	0	1	0	0	0	0	0	0	0	0	4	0	0
FW	(England)	28	Josh March	4	0	0	0	0	0	0	0	0	0	0	0	4	0	0
GK	(England)	1	Luke McGee	3	0	0	0	0	0	0	0	0	0	0	0	3	0	0
DF	(Republic of Ireland)	3	Dom Bernard	3	0	0	0	0	0	0	0	0	0	0	0	3	0	0
DF	(England)	15	Jordan Moore-Taylor	3	0	0	0	0	0	0	0	0	0	0	0	3	0	0
FW	(England)	18	Jake Young	2	0	0	0	0	0	0	0	0	1	0	0	3	0	0
FW	(Scotland)	10	Jack Aitchison	2	0	0	0	0	0	0	0	0	0	0	0	2	0	0
FW	(England)	9	Matty Stevens	1	0	0	0	0	0	0	0	0	0	0	0	1	0	0
DF	(England)	16	Jack Evans	0	0	0	0	0	0	1	0	0	0	0	0	1	0	0
MF	(Ghana)	17	Opi Edwards	0	0	0	0	0	0	1	0	0	0	0	0	1	0	0
MF	(England)	27	Harvey Bunker	0	0	0	0	0	0	1	0	0	0	0	0	1	0	0
			TOTALS	68	2	0	3	0	1	4	0	0	2	0	0	77	2	1
