= 2019–20 Forest Green Rovers F.C. season =

Forest Green Rovers F.C.
2019–20 season
- Chairman: Dale Vince
- Manager: Mark Cooper
- Stadium: The New Lawn
- EFL League Two: 10th
- FA Cup: Second round
- EFL Cup: Second round
- EFL Trophy: Group stage
- Top goalscorer: League: Joseph Mills (7); All: Joseph Mills (8)
Home colours	Third colours

The 2019–20 season was Forest Green Rovers's 131st year in existence and their third consecutive season in League Two. Along with competing in League Two, the club also participated in the FA Cup, EFL Cup and the EFL Trophy.

The season covers the period from 1 July 2019 to 30 June 2020.

== Transfers ==
=== Transfers in ===
Date	Position	Nationality	Name	From	Fee	Ref.
1 July 2019	CM	(The Gambia)	Ebou Adams	(England) Ebbsfleet United	Undisclosed	
1 July 2019	LW	(England)	Taylor Allen	(England) Nuneaton Borough	Undisclosed	
1 July 2019	RW	(Wales)	Aaron Collins	(England) Morecambe	Free transfer	
1 July 2019	RM	(Republic of Ireland)	Kevin Dawson	(England) Cheltenham Town	Free transfer	
1 July 2019	CB	(England)	Matt Mills	(India) Pune City	Free transfer	
1 July 2019	GK	(England)	Adam Smith	(England) Bristol Rovers	Free transfer	
8 July 2019	LB	(England)	Liam Kitching	(England) Leeds United	Undisclosed	
17 July 2019	RB	(Republic of Ireland)	Dominic Bernard	(England) Birmingham City	Free transfer	
27 July 2019	CF	(England)	Mathew Stevens	(England) Peterborough United	Undisclosed	
18 October 2019	LM	(England)	Elliott Frear	(Scotland) Motherwell	Free transfer	
6 January 2020	CF	(England)	Josh March	(England) Leamington	Undisclosed	
31 January 2020	LB	(England)	Chris Stokes	(England) Stevenage	Free transfer	

=== Loans in ===
Date from	Position	Nationality	Name	From	Date until	Ref.
1 July 2019	DM	(England)	James Morton	(England) Bristol City	30 June 2020	
7 August 2019	GK	(England)	Joe Wollacott	(England) Bristol City	30 June 2020	
30 August 2019	MF	(England)	Kyle Taylor	(England) Bournemouth	30 June 2020	
2 September 2019	CF	(Scotland)	Jack Aitchison	(Scotland) Celtic	30 June 2020	
4 January 2020	AM	(Jamaica)	Jevani Brown	(England) Colchester United	30 June 2020	
24 January 2020	AM	(England)	Odin Bailey	(England) Birmingham City	30 June 2020	
24 January 2020	RW	(England)	Robert Hall	(England) Oxford United	30 June 2020	
24 January 2020	GK	(Republic of Ireland)	Conrad Logan	(England) Mansfield Town	30 June 2020	

=== Loans out ===
Date from	Position	Nationality	Name	To	Date until	Ref.
20 August 2019	LW	(England)	Ollie Artwell	(England) Cirencester Town	18 September 2019	
19 September 2019	CF	(England)	Shawn McCoulsky	(England) Bromley	October 2019	
23 September 2019	GK	(England)	Adam Smith	(England) Yeovil Town	October 2019	
25 October 2019	LW	(England)	Taylor Allen	(England) Hereford	24 January 2020	
5 December 2019	CF	(England)	Shawn McCoulsky	(England) FC Halifax Town	January 2020	
11 December 2019	DM	(Wales)	Lloyd James	(England) Torquay United	January 2020	
16 January 2020	RB	(England)	Udoka Godwin-Malife	(England) Eastleigh	February 2020	
24 January 2020	FW	(England)	Taylor Allen	(England) Gloucester City	February 2020	
17 February 2020	MF	(England)	Oliver Artwell	(England) Hungerford Town	March 2020	
28 February 2020	LW	(England)	Dayle Grubb	(England) Eastleigh	30 June 2020	
6 March 2020	GK	(England)	Adam Smith	(England) Yeovil Town	30 June 2020	

=== Transfers out ===
Date	Position	Nationality	Name	To	Fee	Ref.
1 July 2019	CM	(England)	Reece Brown	(England) Huddersfield Town	Undisclosed	
1 July 2019	CF	(England)	Tahvon Campbell	(England) Cheltenham Town	Released	
1 July 2019	CB	(England)	Lee Collins	(England) Yeovil Town	Released	
1 July 2019	CF	(Wales)	Christian Doidge	(Scotland) Hibernian	£250,000	
1 July 2019	CB	(Republic of Ireland)	Gavin Gunning	(England) Billericay Town	Released	
1 July 2019	CB	(England)	Haydn Hollis	(England) Chesterfield	Released	
1 July 2019	LB	(England)	Scott Laird	(England) Weston-super-Mare	Released	
1 July 2019	RW	(England)	Isaac Pearce	(England) Weston-super-Mare	Released	
1 July 2019	CF	(England)	Reuben Reid	(England) Cheltenham Town	Free transfer	
1 July 2019	LM	(France)	Fabien Robert	(England) Gloucester City	Released	
1 July 2019	CM	(England)	Jordan Simpson	(England) Bath City	Released	
2 July 2019	DM	(England)	Paul Digby	(England) Stevenage	Undisclosed	
4 July 2019	CM	(England)	Sam Hendy	(England) Weston-super-Mare	Free transfer	
23 July 2019	GK	(England)	James Montgomery	(England) AFC Fylde	Undisclosed	
13 September 2019	CM	(England)	Charlie Cooper	(England) FC Halifax Town	Free transfer	
28 February 2020	DM	(Wales)	Lloyd James	Free agent	Mutual consent	

== Pre-season ==
FGR announced pre-season friendlies against Weston-super-Mare, Yate Town, Salisbury, Bristol City and Bath City. However, two weeks before their opening match of pre-season was due to take place, Weston-super-mare – managed by former Forest Green academy coach Scott Bartlett – cancelled the fixture. This gap in the schedule was plugged with an away fixture against Swindon Supermarine, with Mark Cooper remarking that the replacement game would represent a "sterner test" for his Forest Green side.

13 July 2019 Friendly	Swindon Supermarine	1–2	Forest Green Rovers	Swindon
15:00 BST	Simpson 78'	Report	McCoulsky 24'; Allen 38'	Stadium: Hunts Copse

17 July 2019 Friendly	Yate Town	1–6	Forest Green Rovers	Yate
19:30 BST	Mehew 10'	Report	Collins 3'; Williams 57', 78'; Mondal 66'; Mills 76', 81'	Stadium: Lodge Road

20 July 2019 Friendly	Salisbury	0–4	Forest Green Rovers	Old Sarum
15:00 BST		Report	Mills 14' (pen.); Mondal 29', 44'; McCoulsky 80'	Stadium: The Raymound McEnhill Stadium

24 July 2019 Friendly	Forest Green Rovers	3–4	Bristol City	Nailsworth
19:45 BST	McCoulsky 3', 43'; Collins 56'	Report	Brownhill 45'; Weimann 77' (pen.); Szmodics 86'; Webster 90+1'	Stadium: The New Lawn

27 July 2019 Friendly	Bath City	1–1	Forest Green Rovers	Twerton
15:00 BST	Richards 76'	Report	McCoulsky 3'	Stadium: Twerton Park

== Competitions ==
=== League Two ===
==== League table ====
Pos	Team	Pld	W	D	L	GF	GA	GD	Pts	PPG	Promotion, qualification or relegation
6	Colchester United	37	15	13	9	52	37	+15	58	1.57	Qualification for League Two play-offs (Note: Four teams play for one spot and promotion to EFL League One.)
7	Northampton Town (O, P)	37	17	7	13	54	40	+14	58	1.57	Qualification for League Two play-offs
8	Port Vale	37	14	15	8	50	44	+6	57	1.54	
9	Bradford City	37	14	12	11	44	40	+4	54	1.46	
10	Forest Green Rovers	36	13	10	13	43	40	+3	49	1.36	
11	Salford City	37	13	11	13	49	46	+3	50	1.35	
12	Walsall	36	13	8	15	40	49	−9	47	1.31	
13	Crawley Town	37	11	15	11	51	47	+4	48	1.30	
14	Newport County	36	12	10	14	32	39	−7	46	1.28	

Source: EFL Official Website
Rules for classification: 1) Points per game; 2) Goal difference; 3) Number of goals scored; 4) Head-to-head results; 5) Wins; 6) Away goals; 7) Penalty points (sec 9.5); 8) 12-point sending off offences
(O) Play-off winners; (P) Promoted

==== Results summary ====
Overall								Home						Away					
Pld	W	D	L	GF	GA	GD	Pts	W	D	L	GF	GA	GD	W	D	L	GF	GA	GD
36	13	10	13	43	40	+3	49	5	4	8	16	22	−6	8	6	5	27	18	+9

Last updated: 7 March 2020.
Source: BBC

==== Results by matchday ====
Matchday	1	2	3	4	5	6	7	8	9	10	11	12	13	14	15	16	17	18	19	20	21	22	23	24	25	26	27	28	29	30	31	32	33	34	35	36
Ground	H	A	H	A	A	H	A	H	A	H	A	H	A	H	A	A	H	A	H	H	A	H	A	H	H	A	A	H	A	H	A	H	H	A	A	A
Result	W	D	W	L	W	L	W	W	D	D	W	W	L	D	W	W	L	W	D	L	L	D	D	W	L	D	W	L	L	L	D	L	L	D	L	W
Position	7	5	3	8	3	9	5	3	5	5	4	1	4	6	3	1	2	2	2	3	6	6	6	5	5	7	7	9	9	9	9	10	10	10	10	11

Updated to match(es) played on 7 March 2020. Source: Statto.com
A = Away; H = Home; W = Win; D = Draw; L = Loss

==== Matches ====
On Thursday, 20 June 2019, the EFL League Two fixtures were revealed.

3 August 2019 1	Forest Green Rovers	1–0	Oldham Athletic	Nailsworth
15:00 BST	Mills (yellow card) 42'; Allen 72'	Report	Maouche (yellow card) 35'; Wheater (yellow card) 54'	Stadium: The New Lawn; Attendance: 2,541; Referee: Neil Hair

10 August 2019 2	Walsall	1–1	Forest Green Rovers	Walsall
15:00 BST	Norman (yellow card) 53'; Scarr (yellow card) 75'; Hardy 86'	Report	Collins (yellow card) 28'; J. Mills 45+6' (pen.) (yellow card) 45+6'; M. Mills (yellow card) 71'	Stadium: Bescot Stadium; Attendance: 5,205; Referee: Robert Lewis

17 August 2019 3	Forest Green Rovers	1–0	Grimsby Town	Nailsworth
15:00 BST	Winchester (yellow card) 31'; Mondal 75'	Report		Stadium: The New Lawn; Attendance: 2,152; Referee: Leigh Doughty

20 August 2019 4	Port Vale	2–1	Forest Green Rovers	Burslem
19:45 BST	Montaño (yellow card) 2'; Bennett 4'; Worrall (yellow card) 25'; Amoo 34'	Report	J. Mills 6'; M. Mills (yellow card) 49'	Stadium: Vale Park; Attendance: 4,010; Referee: Ross Joyce

24 August 2019 5	Bradford City	0–1	Forest Green Rovers	Bradford
15:00 BST	Devine (yellow card) 22'; Donaldson (yellow card) 36'; Vaughan (yellow card) 80'; Akpan (yellow card) 85'; Richards-Everton (yellow card) 90+11'	Report	Adams (yellow card) 40'; Kitching (yellow card) 58'; Winchester (yellow card) 77'; M. Mills (yellow card) 84' (yellow-red card) 90+8'; Grubb (yellow card) 89'; J. Mills 90+3'	Stadium: Valley Parade; Attendance: 13,504; Referee: Andy Haines

31 August 2019 6	Forest Green Rovers	0–2	Newport County	Nailsworth
15:00 BST	Wollacott (red card) 28'; Mills (yellow card) 82'	Report	Amond 4'; Labadie (yellow card) 31'; McNamara (yellow card) 58'; Abrahams (yellow card) 81'; Haynes 90+2'	Stadium: The New Lawn; Attendance: 2,897; Referee: James Adcock

7 September 2019 7	Cambridge United	0–1	Forest Green Rovers	Cambridge
15:00 BST	O'Neil (yellow card) 5'; Richards (penalty missed) 66'; Lewis (yellow card) 85'	Report	Stevens (yellow card) 21'; Mills (yellow card) 69'; Aitchison 78'; Kitching (yellow card) 84'	Stadium: Abbey Stadium; Attendance: 3,784; Referee: Anthony Backhouse

14 September 2019 8	Forest Green Rovers	1–0	Colchester United	Nailsworth
15:00 BST	Prosser 31' (o.g.); Morton (yellow card) 79'; Kitching (yellow card) 82'; Stevens (yellow card) 89'	Report	Sarpong-Wiredu (yellow card) 72'; Lapslie (yellow card) 75'; Prosser (yellow card) 82'	Stadium: The New Lawn; Attendance: 2,758; Referee: Will Finnie

17 September 2019 9	Carlisle United	0–0	Forest Green Rovers	Carlisle
19:45 BST	Jones (yellow card) 76'; Webster (yellow card) 79'; Iredale (yellow card) 83'; Thomas (yellow card) 86'	Report	Morton (yellow card) 18' (yellow-red card) 70'; Winchester (yellow card) 37'	Stadium: Brunton Park; Attendance: 3,219; Referee: Michael Salisbury

21 September 2019 10	Forest Green Rovers	0–0	Stevenage	Nailsworth
15:00 BST	Taylor (yellow card) 48' (yellow-red card) 86'; Kitching (yellow card) 51'; McGinley (yellow card) 85'	Report	Guthrie (yellow card) 19'; Timlin (yellow card) 52'; Watts (yellow card) 90+4'	Stadium: The New Lawn; Attendance: 1,881; Referee: Darren Drysdale

28 September 2019 11	Salford City	0–4	Forest Green Rovers	Salford
15:00 BST	Touray (yellow card) 34'; Maynard (yellow card) 38'; Dieseruvwe (yellow card) 39'	Report	Stevens 3', 59'; Collins 16'; Adams 31'; Thomas (yellow card) 57'	Stadium: Moor Lane; Attendance: 2,561; Referee: James Oldham

5 October 2019 12	Forest Green Rovers	3–1	Crawley Town	Nailsworth
15:00 BST	Mills (penalty missed) 24' 24', 55' (pen.); Collins 52'; Winchester (yellow card) 68'	Report	Bloomfield 58'; Sesay (yellow card) 72' van Velzen (yellow card) 89'; Lubala (yellow card) 90+2'	Stadium: The New Lawn; Attendance: 2,136; Referee: Peter Wright

12 October 2019 13	Exeter City	1–0	Forest Green Rovers	Exeter
15:00 BST	Bowman 11'; L. Martin (yellow card) 27'; A. Martin (yellow card) 83'; Williams (yellow card) 90+2'	Report	Adams (yellow card) 27'; Godwin-Malife (yellow card) 60'; Bernard (yellow card) 90+3'	Stadium: St James Park; Attendance: 5,312; Referee: Paul Marsden

19 October 2019 14	Forest Green Rovers	2–2	Mansfield Town	Nailsworth
15:00 BST	Bernard (yellow card) 1'; Collins 30'; Adams (yellow card) 34'; Aitchison 61'; Mills (yellow card) 86'	Report	Shaughnessy (yellow card) 19'; Gordon (yellow card) 28'; Cook 63', 74'; Benning (yellow card) 73'; Bishop (yellow card) 90+5'	Stadium: The New Lawn; Attendance: 2,276; Referee: Oliver Yates

22 October 2019 15	Morecambe	0–2	Forest Green Rovers	Morecambe
19:45 BST	Alessandra (yellow card) 69' (yellow-red card) 90'	Report	Aitchison 75'; Shephard (yellow card) 87' (goal) 90+4'	Stadium: Globe Arena; Attendance: 1,658; Referee: Matt Donohue

26 October 2019	Forest Green Rovers	v	Crewe Alexandra	Nailsworth
15:00 BST		Report		Stadium: The New Lawn
Note: Fixture was postponed due to a waterlogged pitch.

2 November 2019 16	Cheltenham Town	1–2	Forest Green Rovers	Cheltenham
15:00 GMT	Raglan (yellow card) 23'; Varney 67'; Clements (yellow card) 86'; Ince (yellow card) 90'; Tozer (yellow card) 90+3'	Report	Aitchison 15'; Frear 40'; Collins (yellow card) 89'	Stadium: Whaddon Road; Attendance: 5,788; Referee: Kevin Johnson

16 November 2019 17	Forest Green Rovers	0–1	Plymouth Argyle	Nailsworth
15:00 GMT	Kitching (yellow card) 30'; Bernard (yellow card) 45+6'	Report	Sarcevic 24'; Moore (yellow card) 31'; Edwards (yellow card) 83'; Palmer (yellow card) 90+5'	Stadium: The New Lawn; Attendance: 3,897; Referee: Sam Purkiss

23 November 2019 18	Leyton Orient	2–4	Forest Green Rovers	Leyton
15:00 GMT	Clay (yellow card) 40'; Brophy (yellow card) 40'; Turley (yellow card) 49'; Harrold 55'; Maguire-Drew 78'	Report	Adams 15', 33' (yellow card) 54'; Stevens 43'; Mondal 88'	Stadium: Brisbane Road; Attendance: 4,614; Referee: Christopher Sarginson

26 November 2019 19	Forest Green Rovers	0–0	Crewe Alexandra	Nailsworth
19:45 GMT	Kitching (yellow card) 44'; Rawson (yellow card) 49'; Mills (yellow card) 66'	Report		Stadium: The New Lawn; Attendance: 2,192; Referee: Charles Breakspear

7 December 2019 20	Forest Green Rovers	0–2	Scunthorpe United	Nailsworth
15:00 GMT	Bernard (yellow card) 45'; Stevens (penalty missed) 49'	Report	Perch (yellow card) 5' van Veen (yellow card) 9'; Novak (yellow card) 41'; McGahey (yellow card) 48'; Sutton (yellow card) 52' (yellow-red card) 90+4'; Gilliead 57'; Eisa 71'; Ntlhe (yellow card) 75'	Stadium: The New Lawn; Attendance: 2,060; Referee: John Busby

14 December 2019 21	Northampton Town	1–0	Forest Green Rovers	Northampton
15:00 GMT	Mills 45' (o.g.); McWilliams (yellow card) 76'	Report	Adams (yellow card) 30'	Stadium: Sixfields Stadium; Attendance: 4,534; Referee: Antony Coggins

21 December 2019 22	Forest Green Rovers	2–2	Swindon Town	Nailsworth
15:00 GMT	Mills 55', 90+5'; Winchester (yellow card) 76'	Report	Baudry (yellow card) 9'; Doyle 16', 35'	Stadium: The New Lawn; Attendance: 4,216; Referee: Robert Lewis

26 December 2019 23	Stevenage	0–0	Forest Green Rovers	Stevenage
15:00 GMT	Cowley (yellow card) 33'	Report		Stadium: Broadhall Way; Attendance: 2,388; Referee: James Oldham

29 December 2019 24	Forest Green Rovers	1–0	Macclesfield Town	Nailsworth
15:00 GMT	Adams (yellow card) 45'; Frear (yellow card) 69'; Rawson 74'; Collins (yellow card) 90+4'	Report	O'Keeffe (yellow card) 59'	Stadium: The New Lawn; Attendance: 2,155; Referee: Alan Young

1 January 2020 25	Forest Green Rovers	0–1	Exeter City	Nailsworth
15:00 GMT	Shephard (yellow card) 37' (penalty missed) 58'; Mills (yellow card) 44'; Kitching (yellow card) 71'	Report	Atangana 5' (red card) 46'; Williams (yellow card) 71'; Collins (yellow card) 81'	Stadium: The New Lawn; Attendance: 3,012; Referee: Lee Swabey

4 January 2020 26	Crawley Town	1–1	Forest Green Rovers	Crawley
15:00 GMT	Lubala 45'	Report	Tunnicliffe 63' (o.g.)	Stadium: Broadfield Stadium; Attendance: 2,082; Referee: David Rock

11 January 2020 27	Mansfield Town	3–4	Forest Green Rovers	Mansfield
15:00 GMT	Hamilton 3'; Rose 40'; Maynard 90+1'	Report	Rawson 45+5', 52'; Winchester 60'; Mills (yellow card) 80'; Adams (yellow card) 88'; Collins 90+6'	Stadium: Field Mill; Attendance: 3,956; Referee: Graham Salisbury

18 January 2020 28	Forest Green Rovers	1–2	Salford City	Nailsworth
15:00 GMT	March 11'; Rawson (yellow card) 90+3'	Report	Touray 3'; Hunter (yellow card) 14' (yellow-red card) 90+5'; O'Connor (yellow card) 38' (goal) 55'; Towell (yellow card) 63' (yellow-red card) 75'; Pond (yellow card) 80'	Stadium: The New Lawn; Attendance: 2,707; Referee: Nick Kinseley

25 January 2020 29	Macclesfield Town	2–1	Forest Green Rovers	Macclesfield
15:00 GMT	Horsfall (yellow card) 69'; Ironside 74'; O'Keeffe (red card) 80'; Gnahoua 83'	Report	Winchester 17'; March (penalty missed) 48'	Stadium: Moss Rose; Attendance: 1,653; Referee: Martin Coy

28 January 2020 30	Forest Green Rovers	1–4	Carlisle United	Nailsworth
19:45 GMT	Winchester 59' (pen.); Adams (yellow card) 84'	Report	Thomas 24', 26', 47' (pen.); Hayden (yellow card) 31'; Kayode 49'; Anderton (yellow card) 55'; Watt (yellow card) 83'	Stadium: The New Lawn; Attendance: 1,514; Referee: Brett Huxtable

1 February 2020 31	Grimsby Town	2–2	Forest Green Rovers	Cleethorpes
15:00 GMT	Vernam 19'; Clifton (yellow card) 35'; Glennon 53'; Hendrie (yellow card) 90+1'	Report	Bailey 32'; Kitching (yellow card) 44'; Aitchison 50'; Winchester (yellow card) 55'	Stadium: Blundell Park; Attendance: 4,675; Referee: Paul Marsden

8 February 2020 32	Forest Green Rovers	1–2	Walsall	Nailsworth
15:00 GMT	Collins 87'	Report	Gordon (yellow card) 39' (goal) 52' (pen.); McDonald 73'; Sheron (yellow card) 77'	Stadium: The New Lawn; Attendance: 3,136; Referee: Antony Coggins

11 February 2020 33	Forest Green Rovers	2–3	Port Vale	Nailsworth
19:45 GMT	Kitching (yellow card) 45+3'; Winchester 78' (pen.), 90+5'	Report	Brisley 14' (yellow card) 84'; Pope 38', 70' (pen.) (yellow card) 90+3' (yellow-red card) 90+7'; Montaño (yellow card) 80'; Legge (yellow card) 83'; Clark (red card) 87'	Stadium: The New Lawn; Attendance: 1,682; Referee: Trevor Kettle

15 February 2020 34	Oldham Athletic	1–1	Forest Green Rovers	Oldham
15:00 GMT	Nepomuceno 56'; Missilou (yellow card) 70'	Report	Williams 88'	Stadium: Boundary Park; Attendance: 2,720; Referee: Marc Edwards

22 February 2020 35	Scunthorpe United	1–0	Forest Green Rovers	Scunthorpe
15:00 GMT	McAtee (yellow card) 17' (goal) 46'; Eisa (yellow card) 61'; Gilliead (yellow card) 72'; Butler (yellow card) 83'	Report	Williams (yellow card) 48'	Stadium: Glanford Park; Attendance: 3,706; Referee: Carl Boyeson

29 February 2020	Forest Green Rovers	v	Leyton Orient	Nailsworth
15:00 GMT		Report		Stadium: The New Lawn
Note: Match was postponed due to a waterlogged pitch.

7 March 2020 36	Swindon Town	0–2	Forest Green Rovers	Swindon
15:00 GMT	Doughty (yellow card) 22'; Grant (yellow card) 36'	Report	Stevens 5'; Dawson (yellow card) 30'; Adams 50' (yellow card) 65'; McGinley (yellow card) 73'	Stadium: County Ground; Attendance: 9,257; Referee: Craig Hicks

14 March 2020	Forest Green Rovers	v	Northampton Town	Nailsworth
15:00 GMT				Stadium: The New Lawn
Note: Season was suspended until 3 April 2020, due to the COVID-19 pandemic.

17 March 2020	Forest Green Rovers	v	Morecambe	Nailsworth
19:45 GMT				Stadium: The New Lawn
Note: Season was suspended until 3 April 2020, due to the COVID-19 pandemic.

21 March 2020	Crewe Alexandra	v	Forest Green Rovers	Crewe
15:00 GMT				Stadium: Gresty Road
Note: Season was suspended until 3 April 2020, due to the COVID-19 pandemic.

28 March 2020	Forest Green Rovers	v	Cheltenham Town	Nailsworth
15:00 GMT				Stadium: The New Lawn
Note: Season was suspended until 3 April 2020, due to the COVID-19 pandemic.

4 April 2020	Plymouth Argyle	v	Forest Green Rovers	Plymouth
15:00 BST				Stadium: Home Park
Note: On 3 April, the English Football League decided to postpone all football until safe to do so due to the COVID-19 pandemic.

10 April 2020	Forest Green Rovers	v	Bradford City	Nailsworth
15:00 BST				Stadium: The New Lawn
Note: On 3 April, the English Football League decided to postpone all football until safe to do so due to the COVID-19 pandemic.

13 April 2020	Newport County	v	Forest Green Rovers	Newport
13:00 BST				Stadium: Rodney Parade
Note: On 3 April, the English Football League decided to postpone all football until safe to do so due to the COVID-19 pandemic.

18 April 2020	Forest Green Rovers	v	Cambridge United	Nailsworth
15:00 BST				Stadium: The New Lawn
Note: On 3 April, the English Football League decided to postpone all football until safe to do so due to the COVID-19 pandemic.

25 April 2020	Colchester United	v	Forest Green Rovers	Colchester
15:00 BST				Stadium: Colchester Community Stadium
Note: On 3 April, the English Football League decided to postpone all football until safe to do so due to the COVID-19 pandemic.

=== FA Cup ===
The first round draw was made on 21 October 2019. The second round draw was made live on 11 November from Chichester City's stadium, Oaklands Park.

9 November 2019 First round	Forest Green Rovers	4–0	Billericay Town	Nailsworth
15:00 GMT	Stevens 38'; Mills 45'; Aitchison 45+2'; Shephard 65'	Report	Paxman (yellow card) 44'; Kefalas (yellow card) 54'	Stadium: The New Lawn; Attendance: 1,419; Referee: Graham Salisbury

30 November 2019 Second round	Forest Green Rovers	2–2	Carlisle United	Nailsworth
15:00 GMT	Collins 11'; Adams (yellow card) 53'; Stevens 78'	Report	Jones (yellow card) 20'; Webster (yellow card) 29'; Thomas 40', 76' (yellow card) 77'	Stadium: The New Lawn; Attendance: 1,504; Referee: Trevor Kettle

10 December 2019 Second round replay	Carlisle United	1–0	Forest Green Rovers	Carlisle
19:45 GMT	Loft (yellow card) 19'; Hayden 41'; McKirdy (yellow card) 90+4'	Report	Rawson (yellow card) 43'	Stadium: Brunton Park; Attendance: 1,736; Referee: Andy Haines

=== EFL Cup ===
The first round draw was made on 20 June. The second round draw was made on 13 August 2019 following the conclusion of all but one first-round matches.

13 August 2019 First round	Charlton Athletic	0–0 (3–5 p)	Forest Green Rovers	Charlton
19:45 BST	Aneke (yellow card) 57'	Report	Bernard (yellow card) 86'	Stadium: The Valley; Attendance: 2,693; Referee: John Busby
	Penalties
	Bonne (penalty scored); Sarr (penalty scored); Morgan (penalty missed); Oshilaja (penalty scored)		Mills (penalty scored); Grubb (penalty scored); Adams (penalty scored); Morton (penalty scored); McCoulsky (penalty scored)

28 August 2019 Second round	Bournemouth	0–0 (3–0 p)	Forest Green Rovers	Kings Park
19:45 BST		Report	Kitching (yellow card) 72'	Stadium: Vitality Stadium; Attendance: 9,657; Referee: Dean Whitestone
	Penalties
	King (penalty scored); Solanke (penalty scored); Ibe (penalty missed); Billing (penalty scored)		Mills (penalty missed); Dawson (penalty missed); Morton (penalty missed)

=== EFL Trophy ===
On 9 July 2019, the pre-determined group stage draw was announced with Invited clubs to be drawn on 12 July 2019.

Pos	Div	Team	Pld	W	PW	PL	L	GF	GA	GD	Pts	Qualification
1	L2	Walsall	3	2	0	1	0	7	0	+7	7	Advance to Round 2
2	L1	Coventry City	3	1	1	1	0	3	2	+1	6	Advance to Round 2
3	L2	Forest Green Rovers	3	1	1	0	1	3	8	−5	5	
4	ACA	Southampton U21	3	0	0	0	3	4	7	−3	0	

Source: EFL.com

3 September 2019 Group stage	Forest Green Rovers	3–2	Southampton U21	Nailsworth
19:00 BST	Stevens 29', 89'; Grubb 71'	Report	Hale 16'; N'Lundulu (yellow card) 74' (goal) 80'; Klarer (yellow card) 90'	Stadium: The New Lawn; Attendance: 653; Referee: Brett Huxtable

8 October 2019 Group stage	Forest Green Rovers	0–0 (8–7 p)	Coventry City	Nailsworth
19:00 BST		Report	Bakayoko (yellow card) 29'; McFadzean (yellow card) 70'; Kastaneer (yellow card) 73'	Stadium: The New Lawn; Attendance: 924; Referee: David Rock
	Penalties
	Stevens (penalty scored); Morton (penalty scored); Adams (penalty missed); Bernard (penalty scored); Mondal (penalty scored); Allen (penalty scored); Covil (penalty scored); McGinley (penalty scored); Godwin-Malife (penalty scored)		Godden (penalty scored); Westbrooke (penalty scored); O'Hare (penalty scored); Kelly (penalty missed); Rose (penalty scored); Watson (penalty scored); Eccles (penalty scored); McCallum (penalty scored); McFadzean (penalty missed)

12 November 2019 Group stage	Walsall	6–0	Forest Green Rovers	Bescot
19:00 GMT	Gordon 23', 33', 50' (pen.)/ McDonald 72'; Kinsella 74' (yellow card) 87'; Norman 90'	Report	Collins (yellow card) 51' (yellow-red card) 51'	Stadium: Banks's Stadium; Attendance: 621; Referee: Tom Nield
