= Lewis Thomas (footballer, born 1997) =

Welsh footballer (born 1997)

Personal information
- Full name: Lewis Rhys Thomas
- Date of birth: 20 September 1997 (age 29)
- Place of birth: Swansea, Wales
- Height: 6 ft 3 in (1.91 m)
- Position: Goalkeeper

Team information
- Current team: Bristol City
- Number: 32

Youth career
- 2006–2015: Swansea City

Senior career*
Years	Team	Apps	(Gls)
2014–2018	Swansea City	0	(0)
2018	→ Carmarthen Town (loan)	4	(0)
2018–2023	Forest Green Rovers	33	(0)
2023–	Bristol City	0	(0)
2024	→ Bromley (loan)	4	(0)

International career
2013–2014	Wales U17	7	(0)
2014–2015	Wales U19	4	(0)
- * Club domestic league appearances and goals as of 20:44, 27 December 2024 (UTC)

Lewis Rhys Thomas (born 20 September 1997) is a Welsh professional footballer who plays as a goalkeeper for EFL Championship club Bristol City.

He came through the youth-team at Swansea City and played on loan at Carmarthen Town, before signing with Forest Green Rovers in June 2018.

== Club career ==
=== Swansea City ===
Thomas joined the Academy at Swansea City at the age of nine and signed his first professional contract with the club in July 2015. During his time at the Liberty Stadium he helped the "Swans" to win three FAW Youth Cup titles and was part of the Premier League 2 double-winning squad in the 2016–17 season. On 31 January 2018, joined Carmarthen Town on loan to cover for injured goalkeeper Lee Idzi. He played four Welsh Premier League and one Welsh Cup game for the "Old Gold".

=== Forest Green Rovers ===
On 19 June 2018, Thomas signed a two-year contract with Forest Green Rovers, who were about to embark on their first season in the English Football League. He was the third goalkeeper to join the Green that summer, with goalkeeping coach Pat Mountain also bringing in James Montgomery and Robert Sánchez. He made his debut in professional football on the opening day of the 2019–20 season, keeping a clean sheet in a 1–0 win over Oldham Athletic at The New Lawn on 3 August. He signed a new contract with Forest Green Rovers in November 2019.

=== Bristol City ===
On the 29 September 2023, Thomas joined Bristol City on a free transfer, to cover for injured Harvey Wiles-Richards, for the remainder of the 2023–24 season. On the 22 March 2024, Thomas joined Bromley F.C. on loan until the end of the 2023/2024 season. On 22 May 2026, Bristol City announced it had exercised an option to extend the player's contract to the end of the 2026/27 season.

== Career statistics ==
As of match played 2 March 2021

Appearances and goals by club, season and competition
Club	Season	League			National Cup		League Cup		Other		Total	
Club	Season	Division	Apps	Goals	Apps	Goals	Apps	Goals	Apps	Goals	Apps	Goals
Carmarthen Town (loan)	2017–18	Welsh Premier League	4	0	1	0	0	0	—		5	0
Forest Green Rovers	2018–19	League Two	0	0	0	0	0	0	0	0	0	0
Forest Green Rovers	2019–20	League Two	15	0	0	0	0	0	1 (Note: Appearances in the Football League Trophy)	0	16	0
Forest Green Rovers	2020–21	League Two	13	0	1	0	0	0	3	0	17	0
Forest Green Rovers	2021–22	League Two	0	0	0	0	2	0	3	0	5	0
Forest Green Rovers	2022–23	League One	5	0	2	0	0	0	4	0	11	0
Forest Green Rovers	Total		33	0	3	0	2	0	11	0	49	0
Bristol City	2023–24	Championship	0	0	0	0	0	0	—		0	0
Bristol City	2024–25	Championship	0	0	0	0	0	0	—		0	0
Bristol City	2025–26	Championship	0	0	0	0	0	0	—		0	0
Bristol City	Total		0	0	0	0	0	0	—		0	0
Bromley (loan)	2023–24	National League	4	0	0	0	—		0	0	4	0
Career total			41	0	4	0	2	0	11	0	58	0

== Honours ==
Swansea City U23

- Premier League 2: 2016–17
- Premier League Cup: 2016–17

Bromley

- National League play-offs: 2024
