= Jordan Simpson =

Jordan Simpson may refer to:

- Jordan Simpson (Australian soccer) (born 1985)
- Jordan Simpson (footballer, born 1998), English footballer
