= Junior Mondal =

English footballer (born 1997)

Personal information
- Full name: Lewis Clive Scoble
- Date of birth: 27 March 1997 (age 29)
- Place of birth: Normanby, England
- Height: 5 ft 9 in (1.76 m)
- Positions: Winger; striker

Team information
- Current team: Spennymoor Town

Youth career
- South Park
- Boro Rangers
- Marton
- 2008–2017: Middlesbrough

Senior career*
Years	Team	Apps	(Gls)
2017–2018	Spennymoor Town	0	(0)
2017–2018	→ Whitby Town (dual registration)		
2018–2019	Whitby Town		(6)
2019–2020	Forest Green Rovers	39	(5)
2020–2021	AFC Fylde	8	(0)
2021–2023	Darlington	38	(3)
2022	→ Marske United (loan)	5	(5)
2022	→ Marske United (loan)	4	(0)
2023	→ Marske United (loan)	8	(2)
2023–2024	Whitby Town	36	(9)
2024–	Spennymoor Town	35	(4)
- * Club domestic league appearances and goals as of 11:51, 16 April 2025 (UTC)

Lewis Clive Scoble (born 27 March 1997), known as Junior Mondal, is an English professional footballer who plays as a winger or striker for National League North club Spennymoor Town.

He began his career with Middlesbrough but never appeared for their first team, spent 18 months in the Football League with Forest Green Rovers, and played non-league football for Spennymoor Town, Whitby Town, AFC Fylde, Darlington and Marske United.

== Career ==
=== Early life and career ===
Mondal was born in Normanby, North Yorkshire. He played youth football for South Park, Boro Rangers and Marton, before joining Middlesbrough's academy as an eleven-year-old. When he left school in 2013 he took up a two-year scholarship with Middlesbrough, and his progress was recognised at international level when he was placed on standby for the England under-17 squad for that year's Nordic Tournament, although he was not called upon.

Mondal signed professional forms in 2014, and while still an under-18, made a few appearances for the under-21 team that won a domestic treble of 2014–15 U21 Premier League Division 2, North Riding Senior Cup – he started in the semi-final but did not appear in the final – and the Development League Cup. He moved up to the under-21 team the following season, and scored three goals from four matches to help Middlesbrough reach the 2015–16 UEFA Youth League knockout phase, but missed a significant part of the season with injury. Mondal made his debut in senior football with three appearances in the 2016–17 EFL Cup, and played in all but two of Middlesbrough's matches in that season's U23 Development League, but was nevertheless released at the end of the campaign.

Mondal trained with Hartlepool United and Aberdeen, but eventually signed for National League North club Spennymoor Town and joined Northern Premier League Premier Division club Whitby Town on dual-registration forms in November 2017. He was an unused substitute for Spennymoor in an FA Trophy match in February 2018, and played regularly for Whitby; according to the Whitby Gazette, "his blistering pace [caused] teams no end of problems." Amid interest from teams at a higher level ahead of the 2018–19 season, which included a trial with Blackpool, Mondal signed a one-year contract with Whitby with an option for a second. He scored freely in the first few weeks of the season, and had eight goals from 23 appearances when he moved on.

=== Forest Green Rovers ===
After a trial, Mondal signed an 18-month contract with League Two club Forest Green Rovers, to begin in January 2019. Initially assessed by manager Mark Cooper as "lightning quick [but] probably not one that is ready to go and start a game in the first team", he made his club and Football League debut on 19 January as an 87th-minute substitute in a 2–1 defeat at home to Bury. After four appearances from the bench, Mondal's first league start produced his first league goal, to open the scoring in a 3–0 win against Yeovil Town on 16 February. He ended the season with 18 league appearances and two in the play-off semi-final; in the second leg, Mondal's free kick was headed home by Joseph Mills to tie the scores, but former Forest Green player James Norwood gave Tranmere Rovers the victory. He made 28 appearances in 2019–20, mainly in the first half of the campaign, and was one of eight players released at the end of that season when their contracts expired.

=== Return to non-League football ===
A trial with Carlisle United came to nothing, and Mondal signed a one-year contract with AFC Fylde of the National League North in September 2020. He played in 13 matches in all competitions before the season was ended early because of the COVID-19 pandemic. The club chose not to take up their option for a second season, and he was released.

Mondal moved on to another National North club, Darlington, in May 2021, and was one of six debutants in the starting eleven for their first match of the season, a 3–2 defeat at home to Alfreton Town. He was a regular in the matchday squad but rarely started, with Jake Cassidy and the prolific Luke Charman the strike pairing of choice and Kévin dos Santos and Jarrett Rivers preferred on the wings. On 11 January 2022, Mondal joined Northern Premier League Division One East club Marske United on a two-month loan. He scored six goals from six games in the first month and was then recalled. With Charman gone to a Football League club, the team were on a goalless and losing run; Mondal replaced loan striker Tyrone O'Neill and scored in Darlington's next game. After contributing to three wins and a draw, he missed a month with a hamstring injury, and finished the season with nine starts from thirteen appearances and one more goal, the winner against Leamington in April.

Unable to establish himself in Darlington's starting eleven in the new season, Mondal returned to Marske United in October 2022 on loan for a month; the club had been promoted to the Northern Premier League Premier Division in his absence. He played five matches without scoring, made five brief appearances as a substitute for his parent club, rejoined Marske on 23 March 2023 on loan for the rest of the season, and contributed two goals from his eight appearances.

In June 2023, Mondal returned to Whitby Town. In June 2024, he rejoined Spennymoor Town. He won Spennymoor's goal of the season award for the 2024–25 season for his long-range goal in a 4–1 win away at Southport.

== Personal life ==
Mondal attended St Peter's Catholic College in South Bank. He is the cousin of former Middlesbrough attacking midfielder Luke Williams.

== Career statistics ==
As of match played 12 April 2025

Appearances and goals by club, season and competition
Club	Season	League			FA Cup		League Cup		Other		Total	
Club	Season	Division	Apps	Goals	Apps	Goals	Apps	Goals	Apps	Goals	Apps	Goals
Middlesbrough U23	2016–17	—	—		—		—		3 (Note: Appearance(s) in EFL Trophy)	0	3	0
Spennymoor Town	2017–18	National League North	0	0	0	0	—		0	0	0	0
Whitby Town (loan)	2017–18	Northern Premier League (NPL); Premier Division			—		—					
Whitby Town	2018–19	NPL Premier Division		6		0	—		(Note: Goals in Northern Premier League Challenge Cup)	2	23	8
Forest Green Rovers	2018–19	League Two	18	3	—		—		2 (Note: Appearances in League Two play-offs)	0	20	3
Forest Green Rovers	2019–20	League Two	21	2	2	0	2	0	3	0	28	2
Forest Green Rovers	Total		39	5	2	0	2	0	5	0	48	5
AFC Fylde	2020–21	National League North	8	0	3	0	—		2 (Note: Appearance(s) in FA Trophy)	3	13	3
Darlington	2021–22	National League North	26	3	1	0	—		1	0	28	3
Darlington	2022–23	National League North	12	0	1	0	—		0	0	13	0
Darlington	Total		38	3	2	0	—		1	0	41	3
Marske United (loan)	2021–22	NPL Division One East	5	5	—		—		1 (Note: Appearance in North Riding Senior Cup)	1	6	6
Marske United (loan)	2022–23	NPL Premier Division	12	2	—		—		1	0	13	2
Marske United (loan)	Total		17	7	—		—		2	1	19	8
Whitby Town	2023–24	NPL Premier Division	36	9	5	5	—		4 (Note: One appearance in FA Trophy, three in North Riding Senior Cup)	0	45	14
Spennymoor Town	2024–25	National League North	35	4	1	0	—		5	0	41	4
Career total			173	34	13	5	2	0	22	6	233	45

== Honours ==
Spennymoor Town

- FA Trophy runner-up: 2024–25
