= Liam Kitching =

Professional footballer (born 1999)

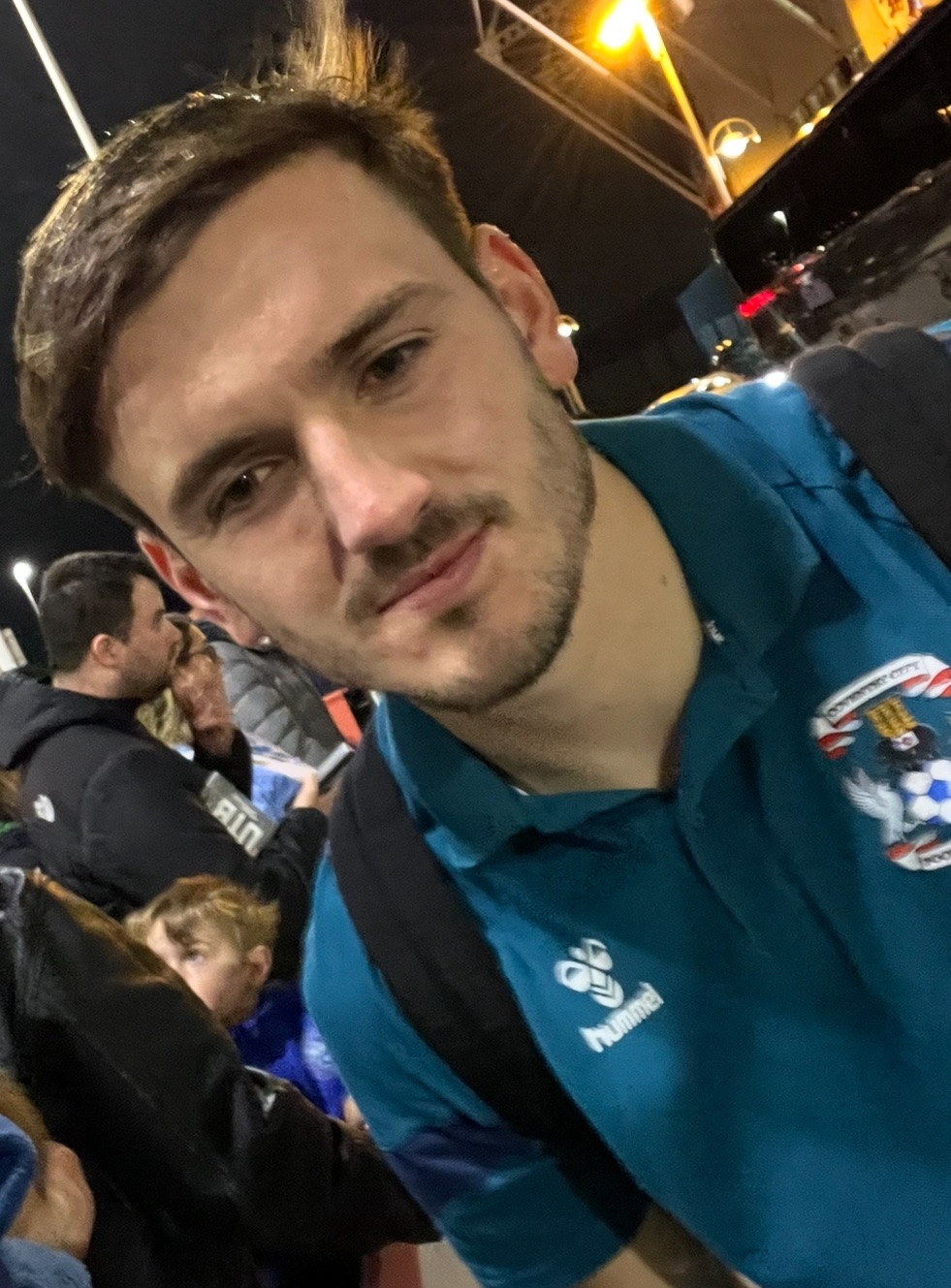
- Kitching with Coventry City in 2024.

Personal information
- Full name: Liam James Kitching
- Date of birth: 25 September 1999 (age 27)
- Place of birth: Harrogate, England
- Height: 6 ft 3 in (1.91 m)
- Position: Defender

Team information
- Current team: Sheffield United (on loan from Coventry City)
- Number: 15

Youth career
- –2018: Leeds United

Senior career*
Years	Team	Apps	(Gls)
2018–2019	Leeds United	0	(0)
2018	→ Harrogate Town (loan)	9	(3)
2018–2019	→ Harrogate Town (loan)	34	(3)
2019–2021	Forest Green Rovers	44	(0)
2021–2023	Barnsley	82	(5)
2023–	Coventry City	93	(3)
2026–	→ Sheffield United (loan)	11	(0)

International career^{‡}
2026–	Republic of Ireland	3	(0)
- * Club domestic league appearances and goals as of 22:29, 21 November 2026 (UTC) ‡ National team caps and goals as of 23:19, 17 November 2026 (UTC)

Liam James Kitching (born 25 September 1999) is a professional footballer who plays as a defender for EFL Championship club Sheffield United, on loan from Premier League club Coventry City, and the Republic of Ireland national team.

He started his career at Leeds United, though did not make a first-team appearance, and also had loan spells at Harrogate Town before joining Forest Green Rovers in July 2019 and Barnsley in 2021.

== Early life ==
Kitching was born in Harrogate and attended Rossett School. He is of Irish descent.

== Club career ==
=== Leeds United ===
Kitching began his career at Leeds United and signed a two-year contract with the club in July 2017. After featuring regularly for Leeds' under-23 side during the first half of the season, Kitching joined Harrogate Town on a one-month loan in January 2018. His first appearance for Harrogate came as a substitute in a 4–1 victory over Stockport County before making his first start for Harrogate on 10 February 2018 in a 3–1 victory over Leamington, in which he scored the first goal of his senior career. On 16 February 2018, his loan was extended until the end of the season. After making 9 league appearances for Harrogate, scoring three goals, Harrogate were promoted to the National League after defeating Brackley Town 3–0 in the play-off final. On 20 July 2018, Kitching signed a new contract with Leeds United before rejoining Harrogate on a six-month loan deal. In January 2019, his loan was extended until the end of the season, after scoring three goals in 25 appearances during the first half of the season. Across the 2018–19 season, Kitching appeared in 34 league games for Harrogate, scoring twice.

=== Forest Green Rovers ===
Kitching signed with Forest Green Rovers in July 2019 on a three-year contract for an undisclosed fee. He made his debut for Forest Green Rovers as a substitute in their 1–1 League Two draw away to Walsall, before making his first start on 13 August 2020 in a penalty shoot-out victory over Charlton Athletic following a 0–0 draw in the EFL Cup, in which Kitching conceded a missed penalty in normal time. He appeared in 29 of Forest Green Rovers' 36 league matches across the truncated 2019–20 season.

=== Barnsley ===
On 5 January 2021, Kitching signed for Championship club Barnsley on a four-year deal for an undisclosed fee believed to be in the region of £600,000. He scored his first goal for the club on 13 September 2022 in a 1–1 draw against Port Vale.

=== Coventry City ===
On 1 September 2023, Kitching transferred to Championship side Coventry City. On 14 February 2024, he scored his first goal for Coventry, a stoppage-time equaliser in a 2–2 draw against Plymouth Argyle. On 1 April, he scored two own goals in a 2–1 home loss to Cardiff City.

He moved on loan to Sheffield United in September 2026.

== International career ==
On 17 September 2026, Kitching was called up to the Republic of Ireland squad for the first time by manager Heimir Hallgrímsson for their four 2026–27 UEFA Nations League B fixtures over September and October. He made his Republic of Ireland debut in a 3–0 win over Israel in the UEFA Nations League on 27 September 2026.

== Style of play ==
Kitching can play as a centre-back or as a left-back.

== Career statistics ==
=== Club ===
As of match played 21 November 2026

Appearances and goals by club, season and competition
Club	Season	League			FA Cup		League Cup		Other		Total	
Club	Season	Division	Apps	Goals	Apps	Goals	Apps	Goals	Apps	Goals	Apps	Goals
Leeds United	2017–18	Championship	0	0	0	0	0	0	0	0	0	0
Leeds United	2018–19	Championship	0	0	0	0	0	0	0	0	0	0
Leeds United	Total		0	0	0	0	0	0	0	0	0	0
Harrogate Town (loan)	2017–18	National League North	9	3	0	0	—		1 (Note: Appearances in FA Trophy)	0	10	3
Harrogate Town (loan)	2018–19	National League	34	3	2	0	—		3	1	39	4
Forest Green Rovers	2019–20	League Two	29	0	3	0	2	0	2 (Note: Appearances in the EFL Trophy)	0	36	0
Forest Green Rovers	2020–21	League Two	15	0	1	0	0	0	1	0	17	0
Forest Green Rovers	Total		44	0	4	0	2	0	3	0	53	0
Barnsley	2020–21	Championship	1	0	0	0	0	0	1 (Note: Appearances in the EFL Championship play-offs)	0	2	0
Barnsley	2021–22	Championship	32	0	2	0	0	0	0	0	34	0
Barnsley	2022–23	League One	45	4	3	0	1	0	4 (Note: One appearance in the EFL Trophy, three appearances and one goal in the EFL League One play-offs)	1	53	5
Barnsley	2023–24	League One	4	1	0	0	0	0	0	0	4	1
Barnsley	Total		82	5	5	0	1	0	5	1	93	6
Coventry City	2023–24	Championship	28	1	4	0	0	0	0	0	32	1
Coventry City	2024–25	Championship	27	0	2	1	2	0	2	0	33	1
Coventry City	2025–26	Championship	38	2	1	0	2	0	0	0	41	2
Coventry City	2026–27	Premier League	0	0	0	0	1	0	—		1	0
Coventry City	Total		93	3	7	1	5	0	2	0	107	4
Sheffield United (loan)	2026–27	Championship	11	0	0	0	0	0	0	0	11	0
Career total			272	14	18	1	8	0	14	2	313	17

=== International ===
As of match played on 17 November 2026

Appearances and goals by national team and year
National team	Year	Apps	Goals
Republic of Ireland	2026	3	0
Total		3	0

== Honours ==
Coventry City

- EFL Championship: 2025–26
