= Nathan McGinley =

English footballer (born 1996)

Personal information
- Full name: Nathan McGinley
- Date of birth: 15 September 1996 (age 30)
- Place of birth: Middlesbrough, England
- Height: 1.91 m (6 ft 3 in)
- Positions: Left-back; centre-back

Team information
- Current team: Whitby Town

Youth career
- –2015: Middlesbrough

Senior career*
Years	Team	Apps	(Gls)
2015–2019	Middlesbrough	0	(0)
2018	→ Wycombe Wanderers (loan)	11	(0)
2018–2019	→ Forest Green Rovers (loan)	19	(0)
2019–2020	Forest Green Rovers	41	(0)
2020–2024	Motherwell	45	(0)
2023–2024	→ Partick Thistle (loan)	0	(0)
2024	Ayr United	0	(0)
2024–2025	Spennymoor Town	7	(0)
2025–	Whitby Town	1	(0)
- * Club domestic league appearances and goals as of 19:13, 6 March 2025 (UTC)

Nathan McGinley (born 15 September 1996) is an English professional footballer who played as a left-back for Northern Premier League Premier Division club Whitby Town.

== Club career ==
=== Middlesbrough ===
McGinley signed his first professional contract with the club on 1 July 2015. He made his debut for the club on 14 August 2018, in a 3–3 draw with Notts County in the EFL Cup, with Middlesbrough advancing via a penalty shoot-out.

==== Wycombe Wanderers loan ====
On 13 January 2018, BBC Sport reported that the versatile defender had joined Wycombe Wanderers on loan for an indeterminate period of time, after he made his first appearance for the club earlier that day at Adams Park in a 3–1 victory over Colchester United. McGinley tweeted after the match that he had joined the club until the end of the 2017–18 season.

=== Forest Green Rovers ===
Shortly after making his debut for Middlesbrough, McGinley joined Forest Green Rovers on loan until January 2019, with an option to sign permanently on an 18 month contract after the fact. On 4 January 2019, McGinley signed permanently for Forest Green Rovers after proving himself a key part of the team during his initial loan.

=== Motherwell ===
On 15 June 2020, Motherwell announced the signing of McGinley on a two-year deal after his contract with Forest Green Rovers had expired.

On 24 February 2022, McGinley extended his contract with Motherwell until the summer of 2024. On 23 January 2024, Motherwell announced the departure of McGinley by mutual consent.

=== Partick Thistle (loan) ===
On the 30 September 2023 McGinley joined Scottish Championship side Partick Thistle on loan until January.

=== Spennymoor Town ===
After leaving Motherwell, McGinley signed for Ayr but was only there for three months and failed to make an appearance for the club. After leaving Ayr, McGinley moved back to England signing for National League North side Spennymoor Town on 17 July 2024.

=== Whitby Town ===
On 28 February 2025, McGinley joined Northern Premier League Premier Division side Whitby Town on a contract until the end of the 2025–26 season. He left the club at the end of the season.

== Career statistics ==
As of match played 27 November 2021

Appearances and goals by club, season and competition
Club	Season	League			National Cup		League Cup		Continental		Other		Total	
Club	Season	Division	Apps	Goals	Apps	Goals	Apps	Goals	Apps	Goals	Apps	Goals	Apps	Goals
Middlesbrough	2017–18	Championship	0	0	0	0	0	0	—		3 (Note: appearances in the EFL Trophy)	0	3	0
Middlesbrough	2018–19	Championship	0	0	0	0	1	0	—		—		1	0
Middlesbrough	Total		0	0	0	0	1	0	0	0	3	0	4	0
Wycombe Wanderers (loan)	2017–18	League Two	11	0	0	0	0	0	—		0	0	11	0
Forest Green Rovers (loan)	2018–19	League Two	19	0	2	0	0	0	—		3	0	24	0
Forest Green Rovers	2018–19	League Two	21	0	0	0	0	0	—		0	0	21	0
Forest Green Rovers	2019–20	League Two	20	0	2	0	2	0	—		3	0	27	0
Forest Green Rovers	Total		41	0	2	0	2	0	0	0	3	0	48	0
Motherwell	2020–21	Scottish Premiership	19	0	3	0	0	0	2 (Note: Appearances in the UEFA Europa League)	0	—		24	0
Motherwell	2021–22	Scottish Premiership	13	0	0	0	3	0	—		—		16	0
Motherwell	Total		32	0	3	0	3	0	2	0	0	0	40	0
Career total			103	0	7	0	6	0	1	0	10	0	127	0
