= Farrend Rawson =

English footballer

Personal information
- Full name: Farrend James Rawson
- Date of birth: 11 July 1996 (age 30)
- Place of birth: Nottingham, England
- Height: 1.93 m (6 ft 4 in)
- Position: Defender

Team information
- Current team: Accrington Stanley
- Number: 5

Youth career
- –2014: Derby County

Senior career*
Years	Team	Apps	(Gls)
2014–2018	Derby County	0	(0)
2015	→ Rotherham United (loan)	4	(0)
2015–2016	→ Rotherham United (loan)	16	(2)
2017	→ Coventry City (loan)	14	(0)
2017–2018	→ Accrington Stanley (loan)	12	(0)
2018–2020	Forest Green Rovers	86	(4)
2020–2022	Mansfield Town	73	(1)
2022–2024	Morecambe	72	(3)
2024–	Accrington Stanley	70	(3)
- * Club domestic league appearances and goals as of 16:42, 3 May 2026 (UTC)

Farrend James Rawson (born 11 July 1996) is an English professional footballer who plays as a central defender for EFL League Two club Accrington Stanley.

== Career ==
Rawson was born in Nottingham and began his footballing career at Derby County. On 3 June 2014 it was reported that Rawson had been offered a professional contract at Derby and would join the club's Under-21 team for the 2014–15 season.

He was called up to the Derby first-team squad and was an unused substitute as Derby won 1–0 at Pride Park against Charlton Athletic in the second round of the League Cup on 26 August 2014.

Rawson signed on a 28-day youth loan for fellow Championship club Rotherham United on 7 March 2015, making his debut the same day in a 2–0 away win against Huddersfield Town. His loan spell at Rotherham expired on 4 April but he played against Brighton & Hove Albion two days later and subsequently Rotherham faced a charge for fielding an ineligible player. On 24 April, Rotherham were deducted three points and fined £30,000 for fielding him in that match.

Rawson re-joined Rotherham on a six-month loan deal on 15 July 2015, along with teammate Kelle Roos. Upon re-signing Rawson, then boss Steve Evans described Rawson as being a future Premier League player and was complimentary about the players performances on loan the previous season calling them "outstanding". Rawson scored his first senior goal in a 1–1 draw against Charlton on 12 September 2015. On 7 January 2016, Rawson's loan at Rotherham was extended until the end of the season, however on 22 February 2016, a clause was activated allowing his immediate recall by Derby.

On 17 January 2017, Rawson joined League One club Coventry City on loan until the end of the season. Rawson was cup-tied for Coventry's win in the 2017 EFL Trophy Final. On 31 August 2017, he moved on loan to Accrington Stanley until January 2018. On 4 January 2018, he signed for Forest Green Rovers on an 18-month contract.

Rawson joined Mansfield Town on 18 July 2020.

On 18 June 2022, Rawson agreed to join League One club Morecambe upon the expiration of his Mansfield Town contract.

On 2 July 2024, Rawson agreed to join League One club Accrington Stanley on a two-year contract.

== Career statistics ==
As of 17 November 2025

Appearances and goals by club, season and competition
Club	Season	League			FA Cup		League Cup		Other		Total	
Club	Season	Division	Apps	Goals	Apps	Goals	Apps	Goals	Apps	Goals	Apps	Goals
Derby County	2014–15	Championship	0	0	0	0	0	0	—		0	0
Derby County	2015–16	Championship	0	0	0	0	0	0	—		0	0
Derby County	2016–17	Championship	0	0	0	0	0	0	—		0	0
Derby County	2017–18	Championship	0	0	0	0	0	0	—		0	0
Derby County	Total		0	0	0	0	0	0	—		0	0
Rotherham United (loan)	2014–15	Championship	4	0	0	0	0	0	—		4	0
Rotherham United (loan)	2015–16	Championship	16	2	0	0	0	0	—		16	2
Rotherham United (loan)	Total		20	2	0	0	0	0	—		20	2
Derby County U23	2016–17	—	—		—		—		3 (Note: Appearances in EFL Trophy)	0	3	0
Coventry City (loan)	2016–17	League One	14	0	0	0	0	0	0	0	14	0
Accrington Stanley (loan)	2017–18	League Two	12	0	0	0	0	0	2	0	14	0
Forest Green Rovers	2017–18	League Two	18	1	0	0	0	0	0	0	18	1
Forest Green Rovers	2018–19	League Two	38	0	2	0	1	0	4 (Note: Two appearances in EFL Trophy and two in EFL League Two play-offs)	0	45	0
Forest Green Rovers	2019–20	League Two	30	3	3	0	1	0	0	0	34	3
Forest Green Rovers	Total		86	4	5	0	2	0	4	0	97	4
Mansfield Town	2020–21	League Two	43	0	3	0	1	0	0	0	47	0
Mansfield Town	2021–22	League Two	30	1	0	0	1	0	3	0	34	1
Mansfield Town	Total		73	1	3	0	2	0	3	0	81	1
Morecambe	2022–23	League One	41	1	1	0	3	0	2	1	47	2
Morecambe	2023–24	League Two	31	2	2	0	1	0	2	1	36	3
Morecambe	Total		72	3	3	0	4	0	4	2	83	5
Accrington Stanley	2024–25	League Two	38	1	2	0	1	0	0	0	41	1
Accrington Stanley	2025–26	League Two	9	1	1	0	2	0	0	0	12	1
Accrington Stanley	Total		47	2	3	0	3	0	0	0	53	2
Career total			298	12	14	0	11	0	16	2	339	14

== Honours ==
Accrington Stanley

- EFL League Two: 2017–18
