= George Williams (footballer, born 1995) =

Wales international footballer (born 1995)

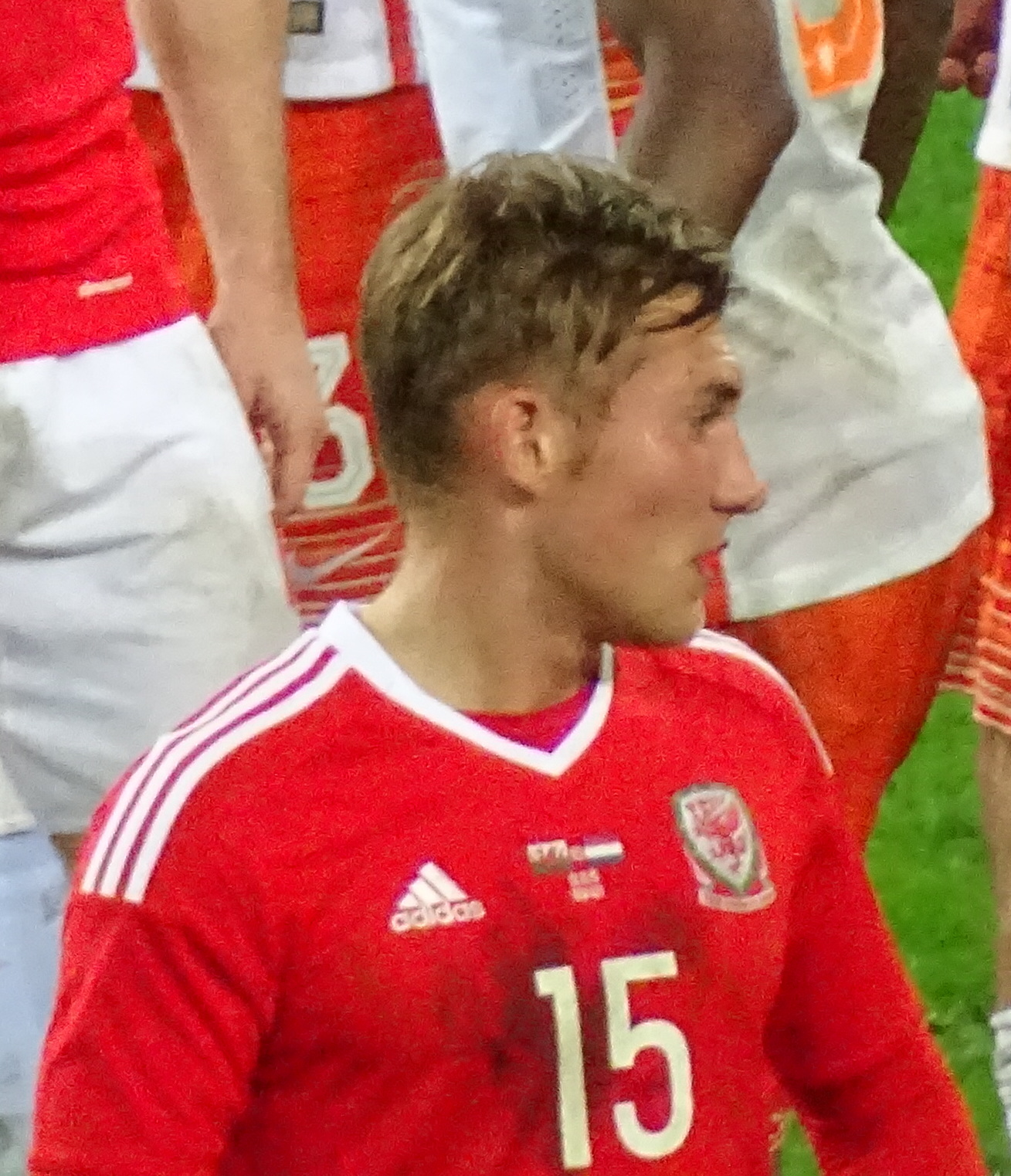
- Williams playing for Wales in 2015

Personal information
- Full name: George Christopher Williams
- Date of birth: 7 September 1995 (age 31)
- Place of birth: Milton Keynes, England
- Height: 5 ft 10 in (1.78 m)
- Position: Winger

Team information
- Current team: Hemel Hempstead Town
- Number: 7

Youth career
- –2012: Milton Keynes Dons
- 2012–2014: Fulham

Senior career*
Years	Team	Apps	(Gls)
2011–2012	Milton Keynes Dons	2	(0)
2012–2018	Fulham	15	(0)
2015	→ Milton Keynes Dons (loan)	4	(0)
2016	→ Gillingham (loan)	10	(0)
2016–2017	→ Milton Keynes Dons (loan)	11	(0)
2018	→ St Johnstone (loan)	11	(0)
2018–2020	Forest Green Rovers	42	(8)
2020–2021	Grimsby Town	19	(2)
2021–2022	Barrow	18	(1)
2022–2023	Boreham Wood	8	(2)
2023	→ Hemel Hempstead Town (loan)	16	(2)
2023–	Hemel Hempstead Town	78	(17)

International career^{‡}
2012	Wales U17	2	(0)
2013	Wales U19	7	(1)
2014–2016	Wales U21	3	(0)
2014–2016	Wales	7	(0)
Medal record
Men's football
Representing Wales
UEFA European Championship
Bronze medal – third place	2016 France
- * Club domestic league appearances and goals as of 4 May 2026 (UTC) ‡ National team caps and goals as of 22:10, 17 January 2022 (UTC)

George Christopher Williams (born 7 September 1995) is a professional footballer who plays as a winger for National League South club Hemel Hempstead Town.

He has previously played in the Football League for Fulham, Milton Keynes Dons, Gillingham, Forest Green Rovers, Grimsby Town and Barrow, as well as in the Scottish Premiership with St Johnstone and for non-league club Boreham Wood. He is a former Wales international who earned 7 caps between 2014 and 2016 and was part of their UEFA Euro 2016 squad.

Between 12 November 2011 and 1 September 2020, Williams was the record holder for being the youngest ever player to score in the FA Cup at the age of 16 years and 66 days following his goal for Milton Keynes Dons in a 6–0 win over Nantwich Town.

== Club career ==
=== Milton Keynes Dons ===
Born in Milton Keynes, Williams joined the academy of Milton Keynes Dons at a young age and progressed through several age groups alongside future England international Dele Alli. On 12 November 2011, at the age of 16 years and 66 days, he made his first team debut and scored in a 6–0 home FA Cup first round win over Nantwich Town. In doing so, Williams became the youngest ever player to score in the history of the competition, as well as becoming the club's youngest ever goalscorer.

=== Fulham ===
On 14 June 2012, Williams joined Premier League side Fulham as a first year academy scholar for the 2012–13 season after an undisclosed compensation package was agreed between the two clubs. Following his move to Fulham, MK Dons chairman Pete Winkelman said he was disappointed seeing Williams leave the club, and told the club's official website: "We are very disappointed that George has chosen not to take up his scholarship or the offer of a professional contract with MK Dons and has instead decided his future is best served with Fulham".

==== Loan spells ====
On 16 February 2015, Williams rejoined League One side Milton Keynes Dons on a youth loan for the remainder of the 2014–15 season, but his loan was cut short by an anterior cruciate ligament injury, keeping him out for between four and six months.

On 12 February 2016, Williams joined League One side Gillingham on loan until the end of the 2015–16 season.

On 29 July 2016, Williams returned to Milton Keynes Dons on loan until the end of the 2016–17 season.

On 31 January 2018, Williams joined Scottish Premiership side St. Johnstone on loan until the end of the 2017–18 season.

=== Forest Green Rovers ===
On 12 June 2018, Williams signed for League Two club Forest Green Rovers. On 4 September 2018, He scored his first goal for the club in a 4-0 EFL Trophy win over Cheltenham Town.

=== Grimsby Town ===
On 13 August 2020, Williams signed a two-year contract with League Two team Grimsby Town.

Following on from Grimsby's relegation from the Football League at the end of the 2020–21 season, Williams was deemed surplus to requirements and was transfer listed by manager Paul Hurst with the player being made available on a free transfer.

On 11 August 2021, Williams was released by Grimsby by mutual consent, he played 23 times for The Mariners, scoring twice in all competitions but had struggled to break into Hurst's team after initially being brought to the club by previous manager Ian Holloway.

=== Barrow ===
On the same day as his release by Grimsby, it was announced that Williams had joined Barrow in August 2021. He was released at the end of the season.

=== Boreham Wood ===
On 14 July 2022, Williams signed for National League club Boreham Wood. In February 2023, he joined Hemel Hempstead Town on loan until the end of the season.

=== Hemel Hempstead Town ===
Following a loan at the end of the previous season, Williams signed a permanent deal with Hemel Hempstead Town on 16 May 2023.

== International career ==
Williams qualifies for Wales through his mother and represented Wales at under-17 and under-19 levels. On 5 March 2014, Williams made his Wales under-21 debut as an 83rd-minute substitute in a 1–0 defeat to England. On 27 May 2014, he was called up to the senior Wales squad for a friendly match against Holland to be played on 4 June 2014 as a replacement for the injured Gareth Bale. He made his international debut as a replacement for Jonathan Williams in the 70th minute of the match.

Williams was included by manager Chris Coleman as a member of Wales' Euro 2016 squad that reached the semi-finals of the tournament, although he did not make an appearance.

== Career statistics ==
=== Club ===
As of match played 13 January 2024

Appearances and goals by club, season and competition
Club	Season	League			National Cup (Note: Includes FA Cup)		League Cup (Note: Includes EFL Cup)		Other		Total	
Club	Season	Division	Apps	Goals	Apps	Goals	Apps	Goals	Apps	Goals	Apps	Goals
Milton Keynes Dons	2011–12	League One	2	0	1	1	0	0	0	0	3	1
Fulham	2012–13	Premier League	0	0	0	0	0	0	—		0	0
Fulham	2013–14	Premier League	0	0	0	0	0	0	—		0	0
Fulham	2014–15	Championship	14	0	0	0	2	0	—		16	0
Fulham	2015–16	Championship	1	0	0	0	0	0	—		1	0
Fulham	2016–17	Championship	0	0	0	0	0	0	0	0	0	0
Fulham	2017–18	Championship	0	0	0	0	0	0	0	0	0	0
Fulham	Total		15	0	0	0	2	0	0	0	17	0
Fulham U21	2017–18	—			—		—		1 (Note: Appearance(s) in EFL Trophy)	1	1	1
Milton Keynes Dons (loan)	2014–15	League One	4	0	0	0	0	0	0	0	4	0
Gillingham (loan)	2015–16	League One	10	0	0	0	0	0	0	0	10	0
Milton Keynes Dons (loan)	2016–17	League One	11	0	0	0	2	0	2	0	15	0
St Johnstone (loan)	2017–18	Scottish Premiership	11	0	0	0	0	0	0	0	11	0
Forest Green Rovers	2018–19	League Two	38	7	2	0	1	0	5 (Note: Three appearances and one goal in EFL Trophy, two appearances in League Two play-offs)	1	46	8
Forest Green Rovers	2019–20	League Two	4	1	0	0	0	0	0	0	4	1
Forest Green Rovers	Total		42	8	2	0	1	0	5	1	50	9
Grimsby Town	2020–21	League Two	19	2	1	0	1	0	2	0	23	2
Barrow	2021–22	League Two	18	1	0	0	1	0	3	0	22	1
Boreham Wood	2022–23	National League	8	2	1	0	—		0	0	9	2
Hemel Hempstead Town (loan)	2022–23	National League South	16	2	—		—		—		16	2
Hemel Hempstead Town	2023–24	National League South	25	8	4	0	—		1 (Note: Appearance in FA Trophy)	0	30	8
Career total			181	23	9	1	7	0	14	2	211	26

=== International ===
As of match played 24 March 2016

Appearances and goals by national team and year
National team	Year	Apps	Goals
Wales	2014	5	0
Wales	2015	1	0
Wales	2016	1	0
Total		7	0
