= Dayle Grubb =

English footballer (born 1991)

Personal information
- Full name: Dayle Grubb
- Date of birth: 24 July 1991 (age 35)
- Place of birth: Weston-super-Mare, England
- Height: 1.83 m (6 ft 0 in)
- Position: Central midfielder

Team information
- Current team: Yate Town

Youth career
- Weston-super-Mare

Senior career*
Years	Team	Apps	(Gls)
2009–2018	Weston-super-Mare	298	(86)
2018–2020	Forest Green Rovers	56	(8)
2020	→ Eastleigh (loan)	3	(0)
2020–2024	Weston-super-Mare	122	(47)
2024–2025	Gloucester City	37	(6)
2025–	Yate Town	0	(0)
- * Club domestic league appearances and goals as of 11:31, 7 June 2025 (UTC)

Dayle Grubb (born 24 July 1991) is an English professional footballer who plays as a central midfielder for Southern League Premier Division South club Yate Town.

== Career ==
Grubb came through the academy at Weston-super-Mare, and worked as a sports teacher during a nine-year stay with the "Seagulls". On 5 December 2017, he signed an 18-month contract with EFL League Two side Forest Green Rovers after scoring 29 goals during the calendar year of 2017; the transfer was confirmed for an undisclosed fee on 1 January. He moved on loan to Eastleigh in February 2020. He left Forest Green Rovers at the end of the 2019–20 season following the expiry of his contract. He returned to Weston-super-Mare in August 2020. In May 2024, he joined Gloucester City. In June 2025, he joined Yate Town.

== Career statistics ==
As of end of 2024–25 season

Appearances and goals by club, season and competition
Club	Season	League			FA Cup		League Cup		Other		Total	
Club	Season	Division	Apps	Goals	Apps	Goals	Apps	Goals	Apps	Goals	Apps	Goals
Weston-super-Mare	2009–10	Conference South	19	0	1	0	—		2 (Note: Appearance(s) in the FA Trophy)	0	22	0
Weston-super-Mare	2010–11	Conference South	36	5	0	0	—		0	0	36	5
Weston-super-Mare	2011–12	Conference South	36	6	3	0	—		5 (Note: One appearance in FA Trophy, four appearances and two goals in Somerset Premier Cup)	2	44	8
Weston-super-Mare	2012–13	Conference South	35	8	3	0	—		3 (Note: One appearance in FA Trophy, two appearances in Somerset Premier Cup)	0	41	8
Weston-super-Mare	2013–14	Conference South	39	9	1	0	—		3 (Note: Two appearances in FA Trophy, one appearance in Somerset Premier Cup)	0	43	9
Weston-super-Mare	2014–15	Conference South	37	11	2	0	—		1	0	40	11
Weston-super-Mare	2015–16	National League South	34	12	1	0	—		2	1	37	13
Weston-super-Mare	2016–17	National League South	39	19	1	0	—		3 (Note: One appearance in FA Trophy, two appearances and one goal in Somerset Premier Cup)	1	43	20
Weston-super-Mare	2017–18	National League South	23	16	1	0	—		2	1	26	17
Weston-super-Mare	Total		298	86	13	0	—		21	5	332	91
Forest Green Rovers	2017–18	League Two	21	5	0	0	0	0	1 (Note: Appearance(s) in the EFL Trophy)	0	22	5
Forest Green Rovers	2018–19	League Two	28	3	1	0	2	0	5 (Note: Three appearances and two goals in EFL Trophy, two appearances in League Two play-offs)	2	36	5
Forest Green Rovers	2019–20	League Two	7	0	2	0	2	0	2	1	13	1
Forest Green Rovers	Total		56	8	3	0	4	0	8	3	71	11
Eastleigh (loan)	2019–20	National League	3	0	—		—		—		3	0
Weston-super-Mare	2020–21	Southern League; Premier Division South	6	1	5	3	—		1	1	12	5
Weston-super-Mare	2021–22	Southern League; Premier Division South	42	19	4	1	—		3 (Note: One appearance in FA Trophy, one appearance Southern League Cup, one appearance in Southern League Premier Division South play-offs)	0	49	20
Weston-super-Mare	2022–23	Southern League; Premier Division South	39	20	4	0	—		2	0	45	20
Weston-super-Mare	2023–24	National League South	35	7	2	0	—		3 (Note: Two appearances and three goals in FA Trophy, one appearance in Somerset Premier Cup)	3	40	10
Weston-super-Mare	Total		122	47	15	4	—		9	4	146	55
Gloucester City	2024–25	Southern League; Premier Division South	37	6	3	1	—		4 (Note: Two appearances and one goal in FA Trophy, two appearances in Southern League Premier Division South play-offs)	1	44	8
Career total			516	147	34	5	4	0	42	13	596	165
