= 2018–19 Forest Green Rovers F.C. season =

Forest Green Rovers
2018–19 season
- Chairman: Dale Vince
- Manager: Mark Cooper
- Stadium: The New Lawn
- EFL League Two: 5th
- FA Cup: First round
- EFL Cup: Second round (Vs. Wycombe Wanderers)
- EFL Trophy: Group stage
- Top goalscorer: League: Christian Doidge (14); All: Christian Doidge (14)
Home colours	Away colours	Third colours

The 2018–19 season was Forest Green Rovers's 130th year in existence and their second consecutive season in League Two. Along with competing in League Two, the club participated in the FA Cup, EFL Cup and the EFL Trophy.

The season covers the period from 1 July 2018 to 30 June 2019.

== Transfers ==
=== Transfers in ===
Date from	Position	Nationality	Name	From	Fee	Ref.
1 July 2018	CF	(England)	Tahvon Campbell	West Bromwich Albion	Free transfer	
1 July 2018	LB	(England)	Joseph Mills	(Australia) Perth Glory	Free transfer	
1 July 2018	GK	(England)	James Montgomery	Gateshead	Free transfer	
1 July 2018	RW	(England)	Isaac Pearce	Fulham	Free transfer	
1 July 2018	RB	(Wales)	Liam Shephard	Peterborough United	Undisclosed	
1 July 2018	GK	(Wales)	Lewis Thomas	Swansea City	Free transfer	
1 July 2018	AM	(Wales)	George Williams	Fulham	Free transfer	
1 July 2018	RM	(Northern Ireland)	Carl Winchester	Cheltenham Town	Free transfer	
4 July 2018	DM	(Wales)	Lloyd James	Exeter City	Undisclosed	
31 July 2018	CB	(England)	Paul Digby	Mansfield Town	Undisclosed	
1 January 2019	LB	(England)	Nathan McGinley	Middlesbrough	Undisclosed	
2 January 2019	LW	(England)	Junior Mondal	Whitby Town	Undisclosed	
3 January 2019	CF	(England)	Shawn McCoulsky	Bristol City	Undisclosed	
24 January 2019	RB	(England)	Udoka Godwin-Malife	Oxford City	Undisclosed	

=== Transfers out ===
Date from	Position	Nationality	Name	To	Fee	Ref.
1 July 2018	CM	(England)	Tom Anderson	Free agent	Released	
1 July 2018	GK	(England)	Cameron Belford	Chorley	Released	
1 July 2018	RB	(England)	Dale Bennett	Sutton United	Mutual consent	
1 July 2018	CF	(Lebanon)	Omar Bugiel	Bromley	Released	
1 July 2018	DM	(England)	Callum Evans	Macclesfield Town	Released	
1 July 2018	RW	(England)	Keanu Marsh-Brown	Newport County	Released	
1 July 2018	CF	(England)	Olly Mehew	Free agent	Released	
1 July 2018	CB	(Cameroon)	Manny Monthé	Tranmere Rovers	Undisclosed	
1 July 2018	CB	(England)	Jon Moran	Chester	Released	
1 July 2018	LM	(England)	Jordan Morris	Cirencester Town	Released	
1 July 2018	DM	(England)	Isaiah Osbourne	Walsall	Rejected contract	
1 July 2018	GK	(England)	Harry Pickering	Free agent	Released	
1 July 2018	CB	(England)	Mark Roberts	Free agent	Released	
1 July 2018	GK	(England)	Sam Russell	Grimsby Town	Released	
1 July 2018	LB	(England)	Alex Whittle	Free agent	Released	
1 July 2018	LB	(England)	Dan Wishart	Sutton United	Free transfer	
13 July 2018	CF	(England)	Luke James	Hartlepool United	Free transfer	

=== Loans in ===
Start date	Position	Nationality	Name	From	End date	Ref.
1 July 2018	GK	(Spain)	Robert Sánchez	Brighton & Hove Albion	31 May 2019	
2 July 2018	LW	(Scotland)	Theo Archibald	Brentford	7 January 2019	
29 August 2018	LB	(England)	Nathan McGinley	Middlesbrough	1 January 2019	
31 August 2018	CF	(England)	Ben Morris	Ipswich Town	31 May 2019	
31 August 2018	CM	(England)	Matt Worthington	Bournemouth	January 2019	
14 January 2019	GK	(England)	Lewis Ward	Reading	31 May 2019	
31 January 2019	DM	(England)	Ben Liddle	Middlesbrough	31 May 2019	

=== Loans out ===
Start date	Position	Nationality	Name	To	End date	Ref.
1 July 2018	CM	(England)	Charlie Cooper	Newport County	13 December 2018	
10 August 2018	GK	(Wales)	Lewis Thomas	Yate Town	14 October 2018	
23 August 2018	CB	(England)	Haydn Hollis	Chesterfield	31 May 2019	
31 August 2018	CF	(Wales)	Christian Doidge	Bolton Wanderers	1 January 2019	
6 September 2018	CM	(England)	Jordan Simpson	Havant & Waterlooville	October 2018	
20 September 2018	LM	(France)	Fabien Robert	Gloucester City	November 2018	
21 December 2018	RW	(England)	Isaac Pearce	Gloucester City	January 2019	
11 January 2019	LM	(France)	Fabien Robert	Gloucester City	31 May 2019	
17 January 2019	LB	(England)	Scott Laird	Walsall	31 May 2019	
22 January 2019	GK	(Wales)	Lewis Thomas	Yate Town	31 May 2019	
31 January 2019	CF	(England)	Tahvon Campbell	Gillingham	31 May 2019	
11 March 2019	CM	(England)	Charlie Cooper	Boreham Wood	31 May 2019	
22 March 2019	CM	(England)	Jordan Simpson	Hampton & Richmond Borough	31 May 2019	

== Competitions ==
=== Pre-season friendlies ===
FGR will play Brimscombe & Thrupp, Torquay United, Weston-super-Mare, Leeds United, Swindon Supermarine, Bristol Rovers, Hereford, Shortwood United and Wrexham in pre-season.

6 July 2018 Friendly	Brimscombe & Thrupp	0–2	Forest Green Rovers	Brimscombe and Thrupp
19:30 BST		Report	Reid 7', 23'	Stadium: The Meadow

10 July 2018 Friendly	Torquay United	1–4	Forest Green Rovers	Torquay
19:30 BST	Nabi 30'		Winchester 5'; Archibald 48'; Trialist 59' (o.g.); Brown 64'	Stadium: Plainmoor

13 July 2018 Friendly	Weston-super-Mare	6–6	Forest Green Rovers	Weston-super-Mare
19:30 BST	Lucas 12', 43'; Cane 14'; Swallow 62'; McGrory 65'; Trialist 90'	Report	Archibald 3', 52'; Doidge 8' (pen.), 29', 32' (pen.); Grubb 24'	Stadium: Woodspring Stadium

17 July 2018 Friendly	Forest Green Rovers	1–2	Leeds United	Nailsworth
19:00 BST	Grubb 45'	Report	Roofe 16'; Ayling 25'	Stadium: The New Lawn

18 July 2018 Friendly	Swindon Supermarine	2–2	Forest Green Rovers	South Marston
19:30 BST	McDonagh 8'; Parsons 65'	Report	Ogunleye 26'; Laird 82'	Stadium: Webbswood Stadium

21 July 2018 Friendly	Forest Green Rovers	1–0	Bristol Rovers	Nailsworth
15:00 BST	Doidge 7' (pen.)	Report		Stadium: The New Lawn

25 July 2018 Friendly	Hereford	1–3	Forest Green Rovers	Hereford
19:45 BST	White 51'	Report	Rawson 21'; Reid 71', 78'	Stadium: Edgar Street

27 July 2018 Friendly	Shortwood United	v	Forest Green Rovers	Nailsworth
19:30 BST				Stadium: Meadowbank Ground

28 July 2018 Friendly	Wrexham	v	Forest Green Rovers	Wrexham
15:00 BST				Stadium: Racecourse Ground

=== League Two ===
==== League table ====
Pos	Team	Pld	W	D	L	GF	GA	GD	Pts	Promotion, qualification or relegation
3	Milton Keynes Dons (P)	46	23	10	13	71	49	+22	79	Promotion to EFL League One
4	Mansfield Town	46	20	16	10	69	41	+28	76	Qualification for League Two play-offs (Note: Four teams play for one spot and promotion to EFL League One.)
5	Forest Green Rovers	46	20	14	12	68	47	+21	74	Qualification for League Two play-offs
6	Tranmere Rovers (O, P)	46	20	13	13	63	50	+13	73	Qualification for League Two play-offs
7	Newport County	46	20	11	15	59	59	0	71	Qualification for League Two play-offs

Source: EFL Official Website
Rules for classification: 1) Points; 2) Goal difference; 3) Number of goals scored; 4) Head-to-head results
(O) Play-off winners; (P) Promoted

==== Results summary ====
Overall								Home						Away					
Pld	W	D	L	GF	GA	GD	Pts	W	D	L	GF	GA	GD	W	D	L	GF	GA	GD
46	20	14	12	68	47	+21	74	8	9	6	28	20	+8	12	5	6	40	27	+13

Last updated: 4 May 2019.
Source: BBC

==== Results by matchday ====
Matchday	1	2	3	4	5	6	7	8	9	10	11	12	13	14	15	16	17	18	19	20	21	22	23	24	25	26	27	28	29	30	31	32	33	34	35	36	37	38	39	40	41	42	43	44	45	46
Ground	A	H	A	H	H	A	H	A	H	A	A	H	A	H	H	A	A	H	A	H	A	H	A	A	H	A	H	H	A	H	H	A	H	A	H	A	A	H	A	H	A	H	A	H	A	H
Result	W	D	D	D	D	W	D	D	W	D	W	D	L	D	W	W	L	L	W	L	W	W	W	D	W	D	L	W	W	D	L	L	W	L	L	L	W	D	W	L	W	W	W	W	L	D
Position	2	4	7	9	12	7	9	12	7	7	5	6	8	9	6	6	8	10	10	10	8	7	7	6	5	7	7	6	5	4	6	7	5	6	7	9	6	6	6	6	6	6	6	5	5	5

Updated to match(es) played on 4 May 2019. Source: Statto.com
A = Away; H = Home; W = Win; D = Draw; L = Loss

==== Matches ====
On 21 June 2018, the League Two fixtures for the forthcoming season were announced.

4 August 2018 1	Grimsby Town	1–4	Forest Green Rovers	Cleethorpes
15:00 BST	Rose 31' (pen.)	Report	Winchester 51'; Collins 67' (o.g.); Doidge 70', 83'	Stadium: Blundell Park; Attendance: 5,879; Referee: Martin Coy

11 August 2018 2	Forest Green Rovers	1–1	Oldham Athletic	Nailsworth
15:00 BST	Reid 22'	Report	Gardner 78' (pen.)	Stadium: The New Lawn; Attendance: 2,759; Referee: Darren Drysdale

18 August 2018 3	Bury	1–1	Forest Green Rovers	Bury
15:00 BST	Aimson 90'	Report	Doidge 29'; Gunning (red card) 76'	Stadium: Gigg Lane; Attendance: 2,853; Referee: John Busby

21 August 2018 4	Forest Green Rovers	0–0	Stevenage	Nailsworth
19:45 BST		Report		Stadium: The New Lawn; Attendance: 1,834; Referee: Brett Huxtable

25 August 2018 5	Forest Green Rovers	1–1	Swindon Town	Nailsworth
15:00 BST	Doidge 5'	Report	Doughty 11' (pen.)	Stadium: The New Lawn; Attendance: 3,458; Referee: Andy Davies

1 September 2018 6	Notts County	1–3	Forest Green Rovers	Nottingham
15:00 BST	Jones (red card) 52'; Stead 70'	Report	Shephard 29'; Reid 59'; Grubb 84'	Stadium: Meadow Lane; Attendance: 6,049; Referee: Peter Wright

8 September 2018 7	Forest Green Rovers	1–1	Port Vale	Nailsworth
15:00 BST	Winchester 15'; Rawson (red card) 76'	Report	Pope 73' (pen.)	Stadium: The New Lawn; Attendance: 2,263; Referee: Alan Young

15 September 2018 8	Milton Keynes Dons	1–1	Forest Green Rovers	Denbigh
15:00 BST	Aneke 31'	Report	Reid 80' (pen.)	Stadium: Stadium mk Attendance: 6,638; Referee: Ben Toner

22 September 2018 9	Forest Green Rovers	1–0	Crawley Town	Nailsworth
15:00 BST	Reid 70'	Report	McNerney (red card) 90+3'	Stadium: The New Lawn; Attendance: 2,089; Referee: Tom Nield

29 September 2018 10	Macclesfield Town	1–1	Forest Green Rovers	Macclesfield
15:00 BST	Wilson 55'	Report	Grubb 48'	Stadium: Moss Rose; Attendance: 1,503; Referee: Graham Salisbury

2 October 2018 11	Cambridge United	1–3	Forest Green Rovers	Cambridge
19:45 BST	Brown 21'; Carroll (red card) 76'	Report	Digby 34'; Grubb 55'; Worthington 88'	Stadium: Abbey Stadium; Attendance: 3,059; Referee: Charles Breakspear

6 October 2018 12	Forest Green Rovers	1–1	Newport County	Nailsworth
15:00 BST (UTC+1)	Winchester (yellow card) 4'; Bennett 18' (o.g.); Reid (yellow card) 65'	Report	Amond 38'	Stadium: The New Lawn; Attendance: 3,081; Referee: Tim Robinson

13 October 2018 13	Northampton Town	2–1	Forest Green Rovers	Northampton
14:00 BST	Pierre 63'; Williams 90+7'	Report	Reid 43'	Stadium: Sixfields Stadium; Attendance: 5,073 (234); Referee: Ollie Yates

20 October 2018 14	Forest Green Rovers	1–1	Cheltenham Town	Nailsworth
15:00 BST	Mills 75'	Report	Barnett 26'	Stadium: The New Lawn; Attendance: 3,582; Referee: Kevin Johnson

23 October 2018 15	Forest Green Rovers	3–1	Tranmere Rovers	Nailsworth
19:45 BST	Brown 11'; Shephard 39'; Campbell 90+8'	Report	Mullin 85'	Stadium: The New Lawn; Attendance: 2,181; Referee: Antony Coggins

27 October 2018 16	Exeter City	1–2	Forest Green Rovers	Exeter
15:00 BST	Tillson (yellow card) 26'; Martin 90+4'	Report	Campbell (yellow card) 31'; James (yellow card) 46'; Brown 50'; Shephard 72'; Archibald (yellow card) 90'	Stadium: St James Park; Attendance: 4,983; Referee: Dean Whitestone

3 November 2018 17	Lincoln City	2–1	Forest Green Rovers	Lincoln
15:00 GMT	Akinde 8'; Anderson (yellow card) 47'; Gordon 72'; Andrade (yellow card) 77'	Report	Brown 12', (yellow card) 39'; Gunning (yellow card) 67'	Stadium: Sincil Bank; Attendance: 8,542; Referee: Anthony Backhouse

17 November 2018 18	Forest Green Rovers	0–1	Morecambe	Nailsworth
15:00 GMT		Report	Wildig 86'	Stadium: The New Lawn; Attendance: 3,085; Referee: Ben Toner

24 November 2018 19	Carlisle United	1–2	Forest Green Rovers	Carlisle
15:00 GMT	Devitt 77' (pen.)	Report	Morris 12'; Winchester 71'	Stadium: Brunton Park; Attendance: 4,166; Referee: Carl Boyeson

27 November 2018 20	Forest Green Rovers	0–1	Colchester United	Nailsworth
19:45 GMT		Report	Szmodics 25'	Stadium: The New Lawn; Attendance: 1,600; Referee: Kevin Johnson

8 December 2018 21	Yeovil Town	1–2	Forest Green Rovers	Yeovil
15:00 GMT	Browne 56'	Report	Digby (red card) 76'; Reid 90+2'; Williams 90+4'	Stadium: Huish Park; Attendance: 2,529; Referee: Michael Salisbury

15 December 2018 A	Forest Green Rovers	A–A	Mansfield Town	Nailsworth
15:00 GMT		Report		Stadium: The New Lawn; Referee: James Linington
Note: Fixture was abandoned at half-time due to a waterlogged pitch.

22 December 2018 22	Forest Green Rovers	1–0	Crewe Alexandra	Nailsworth
15:00 GMT	Mills 45'; Montgomery (yellow card) 55'; Rawson (yellow card) 87'; Campbell (yellow card) 89'	Report	Jones (yellow card) 90+2'	Stadium: The New Lawn; Attendance: 2,388; Referee: Matt Donohue

26 December 2018 23	Newport County	1–4	Forest Green Rovers	Newport
15:00 GMT	Bennett (yellow card) 33'; Pipe (yellow card) 40'; Amond 45+2' (pen.); Butler (red card) 51'	Report	Williams 3', 52', 57'; Campbell 43'	Stadium: Rodney Parade; Attendance: 4,203; Referee: John Busby

29 December 2018 24	Cheltenham Town	2–2	Forest Green Rovers	Cheltenham
15:00 GMT	Varney 78'; Thomas 80'; Maddox (yellow card) 90'	Report	McGinley (yellow card) 44'; Campbell 61'; Williams 67'	Stadium: Whaddon Road; Attendance: 5,125; Referee: Robert Lewis

1 January 2019 25	Forest Green Rovers	2–1	Northampton Town	Nailsworth
15:00 GMT	Williams 1'; Gunning (yellow card) 28'; Shephard (yellow card) 45+2'; Archibald 90+4'	Report	Cornell (yellow card) 45+2'; Foley 50'; Williams (yellow card) 73'	Stadium: The New Lawn; Attendance: 2,909; Referee: Kevin Johnson

12 January 2019 26	Oldham Athletic	0–0	Forest Green Rovers	Oldham
15:00 GMT	Edmundson (yellow card) 32'; Lang (yellow card) 34'; Branger (yellow card) 65'	Report	Mills (yellow card) 73'	Stadium: Boundary Park; Attendance: 4,194; Referee: Dean Whitestone

19 January 2019 27	Forest Green Rovers	1–2	Bury	Nailsworth
15:00 GMT	Brown 28'; James (yellow card) 45'; Winchester (yellow card) 45+2'	Report	O'Shea 69'; Maynard 83'	Stadium: The New Lawn; Attendance: 2,940; Referee: Lee Swabey

22 January 2019 28	Forest Green Rovers	3–0	Grimsby Town	Nailsworth
19:45 GMT	Doidge 29', 45+1'; Brown 50'	Report	Öhman (yellow card) 49'; Rose (yellow card) 64'	Stadium: The New Lawn; Attendance: 1,810; Referee: Antony Coggins

26 January 2019 29	Stevenage	0–2	Forest Green Rovers	Stevenage
15:00 GMT	Nugent (yellow card) 29'	Report	Shephard 13'; Montgomery (yellow card) 35'; Doidge 55'	Stadium: Broadhall Way; Attendance: 2,494; Referee: Darren Drysdale

29 January 2019 30	Forest Green Rovers	1–1	Mansfield Town	Nailsworth
19:45 GMT	Reid 70'	Report	Grant 14'; Sweeney (yellow card) 40'	Stadium: The New Lawn; Attendance: 2,428; Referee: Christopher Sarginson

2 February 2019 P	Swindon Town	P–P	Forest Green Rovers	Swindon
15:00 GMT		Report		Stadium: County Ground
Note: Fixture was postponed due to heavy snowfall in the area.

9 February 2019 31	Forest Green Rovers	1–2	Notts County	Nailsworth
15:00 GMT	Doidge (yellow card) 39'; Mills 63'	Report	O'Brien 57' (yellow card) 76'; Schofield (yellow card) 62'; Boldewijn 77'; Barclay (yellow card) 79'; Hemmings (yellow card) 90'; Milsom (yellow card) 90+1'	Stadium: The New Lawn; Attendance: 2,871; Referee: Neil Hair

12 February 2019 32	Swindon Town	2–0	Forest Green Rovers	Swindon
19:45 GMT	Woolery 36'; Robinson 44'; Koiki (yellow card) 69'; Carroll (yellow card) 83'	Report	Brown (yellow card) 8'; Gunning (yellow card) 25'; Liddle (yellow card) 56'	Stadium: County Ground; Attendance: 6,261; Referee: David Coote

16 February 2019 33	Forest Green Rovers	3–0	Yeovil Town	Nailsworth
15:00 GMT	Collins (yellow card) 16' (goal) 58'; Mondal 22'; Doidge 31'; Digby (yellow card) 61'	Report	Gafaiti (yellow card) 51'; Dickinson (yellow card) 76'; Alcock (yellow card) 83'	Stadium: The New Lawn; Attendance: 2,449; Referee: Ben Toner

23 February 2019 34	Mansfield Town	1–0	Forest Green Rovers	Mansfield
15:00 GMT	Preston (yellow card) 29'; Benning (yellow card) 32'; Walker 69' (red card) 90+7'; Tomlinson (yellow card) 90+3'	Report	Digby (yellow card) 32'; Winchester (yellow card) 52'; Gunning (yellow card) 64'; Doidge (yellow card) 90+6'	Stadium: Field Mill; Attendance: 5,256; Referee: Matt Donohue

2 March 2019 35	Forest Green Rovers	1–2	Lincoln City	Nailsworth
15:00 GMT	Brown 7'; Collins (yellow card) 77'	Report	Akinde 13', 79' (pen.)	Stadium: The New Lawn; Attendance: 3,165; Referee: Andy Davies

9 March 2019 36	Morecambe	3–0	Forest Green Rovers	Morecambe
15:00 GMT	Oates 6'; Collins 35'; Kenyon 71'	Report		Stadium: Globe Arena; Attendance: 1,528; Referee: Carl Boyeson

12 March 2019 37	Colchester United	0–3	Forest Green Rovers	Colchester
19:45 GMT	Nouble (yellow card) 36' (yellow-red card) 85'	Report	Shephard 21'; Brown 33'; Ward (yellow card) 40'; Doidge 81'	Stadium: Colchester Community Stadium; Attendance: 2,871; Referee: Alan Young

16 March 2019 38	Forest Green Rovers	1–1	Carlisle United	Nailsworth
15:00 GMT	Brown 31'	Report	Thomas 49'; Parkes (yellow card) 84'	Stadium: The New Lawn; Attendance: 2,381; Referee: Graham Salisbury

23 March 2019 39	Port Vale	0–2	Forest Green Rovers	Burslem
15:00 GMT	Clark (yellow card) 86'	Report	Brown 69', 90+4'	Stadium: Vale Park; Attendance: 4,429; Referee: Paul Marsden

30 March 2019 40	Forest Green Rovers	1–2	Milton Keynes Dons	Nailsworth
15:00 GMT	Rawson (yellow card) 45+1'; Williams 63'	Report	Agard 38'; Martin (yellow card) 60' (goal) 87'; McGrandles (yellow card) 77'	Stadium: The New Lawn; Attendance: 3,220; Referee: Christopher Sarginson

6 April 2019 41	Crawley Town	1–2	Forest Green Rovers	Crawley
15:00 BST	Bulman 24'; Morais (yellow card) 65'; McNerney (yellow card) 85'	Report	Doidge (yellow card) 23' (goal) 34', 88'	Stadium: Broadfield Stadium; Attendance: 2,088; Referee: Darren Drysdale

13 April 2019 42	Forest Green Rovers	2–0	Macclesfield Town	Nailsworth
15:00 BST	Doidge 56'; Mills 88'	Report	Whitaker (yellow card) 64'; Kelleher (yellow card) 71'	Stadium: The New Lawn; Attendance: 2,386; Referee: Craig Hicks

19 April 2019 43	Tranmere Rovers	0–1	Forest Green Rovers	Birkenhead
15:00 BST	Norwood (yellow card) 80'	Report	Mondal 47'; McGinley (yellow card) 80'	Stadium: Prenton Park; Attendance: 9,468; Referee: Dean Whitestone

22 April 2019 44	Forest Green Rovers	2–1	Cambridge United	Nailsworth
15:00 BST	Gunning 24'; Doidge 76'	Report	Lewis 66'; Knowles (yellow card) 87'	Stadium: The New Lawn; Attendance: 2,699; Referee: Thomas Bramall

27 April 2019 45	Crewe Alexandra	4–3	Forest Green Rovers	Crewe
15:00 BST	Porter 19'; Mills 63' (o.g.); Hunt (yellow card) 81'; Kirk 87', 89' (yellow card) 90'	Report	Brown 36' (yellow card) 61'; Mondal 47'; Gunning (yellow card) 52'; Doidge 52'; Mills (yellow card) 89'; Reid (yellow card) 90+5'	Stadium: Gresty Road; Attendance: 3,906; Referee: Graham Salisbury

4 May 2019 46	Forest Green Rovers	0–0	Exeter City	Nailsworth
12:30 BST	Gunning (yellow card) 39'	Report	Martin (yellow card) 39'; Collins (yellow card) 56'; Woodman (yellow card) 61'; Sweeney (yellow card) 67'	Stadium: The New Lawn; Attendance: 4,537; Referee: Ben Toner

==== Play-offs ====
10 May 2019 Semi-final first leg	Tranmere Rovers	1–0	Forest Green Rovers	Birkenhead
19:45 BST	Banks 26'	Report	Gunning (red card) 15'	Stadium: Prenton Park; Attendance: 9,579; Referee: John Busby

13 May 2019 Semi-final second leg	Forest Green Rovers	1–1 (1–2 agg.)	Tranmere Rovers	Nailsworth
19:45 BST	Mills 12'; Winchester (yellow card) 45+2' (yellow-red card) 67'	Report	Banks (yellow card) 16'; Norwood 27'	Stadium: The New Lawn; Attendance: 4,492; Referee: Eddie Ilderton

=== FA Cup ===
The first round draw was made live on BBC by Dennis Wise and Dion Dublin on 22 October.

10 November 2018 First round	Oxford United	0–0	Forest Green Rovers	Oxford
15:00 GMT		Report		Stadium: Kassam Stadium; Attendance: 3,933; Referee: Nicholas Kinseley

20 November 2018 First round replay	Forest Green Rovers	0–3	Oxford United	Nailsworth
19:45 GMT		Report	Henry 36'; Mackie 47'; Browne 78'	Stadium: The New Lawn; Attendance: 1,614; Referee: Trevor Kettle

=== EFL Cup ===
On 15 June 2018, the draw for the first round was made in Vietnam. The second round draw was made from the Stadium of Light on 16 August.

14 August 2018 First round	Swindon Town	0–1	Forest Green Rovers	Swindon
19:45 BST		Report	Campbell 60'	Stadium: County Ground; Referee: David Webb

28 August 2018 Second round	Wycombe Wanderers	2–2 (4–3 p)	Forest Green Rovers	High Wycombe
19:45 BST	Kashket 55'; Stewart 74'	Report	Grubb 57'; Winchester 86'	Stadium: Adams Park; Attendance: 1,934; Referee: Antony Coggins
	Penalties
	Jacobson (penalty scored); Freeman (penalty scored); McCarthy (penalty scored); Stewart (penalty scored); Saunders (penalty missed)		Doidge (penalty missed); Gunning (penalty scored); Grubb (penalty scored); Brown (penalty scored); Digby (penalty missed)

=== EFL Trophy ===
On 13 July 2018, the initial group stage draw bar the U21 invited clubs was announced.

Pos	Lge	Team	Pld	W	PW	PL	L	GF	GA	GD	Pts	Qualification
1	L2	Cheltenham Town	3	2	0	0	1	8	6	+2	6	Round 2
2	ACA	Arsenal U21	3	2	0	0	1	8	7	+1	6	Round 2
3	L2	Forest Green Rovers	3	1	0	1	1	6	4	+2	4	
4	L1	Coventry City	3	0	1	0	2	1	6	−5	2	

Source: EFL.com

4 September 2018 Group stages	Forest Green Rovers	4–0	Cheltenham Town	Nailsworth
19:30 BST	Grubb 14'; Campbell 48'; Williams 85'; Pearce 90+2'	Report		Stadium: The New Lawn; Attendance: 1,074; Referee: Lee Swabey

9 October 2018 Group stages	Coventry City	1–1 (4–2 p)	Forest Green Rovers	Coventry
19:45 BST	Hiwula 3'	Report	Pearce 68'	Stadium: Ricoh Arena; Attendance: 1,341
	Penalties
	Hiwula (penalty missed); Bakayoko (penalty scored); Camwell (penalty scored); Kelly (penalty scored); Hyam (penalty scored)		Worthington (penalty missed); Williams (penalty missed); Grubb (penalty scored); Archibald (penalty scored)

7 November 2018 Group stages	Forest Green Rovers	1–3	Arsenal U21	Nailsworth
19:00 GMT	Grubb 62'	Report	Willock 39' (pen.), 42'; John-Jules 85'	Stadium: The New Lawn; Attendance: 1,602; Referee: Christopher Sarginson
