= Shawn McCoulsky =

English footballer (born 1997)

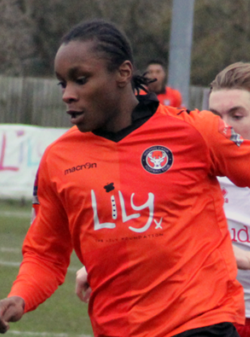
- McCoulsky in action for Walton Casuals in 2015

Personal information
- Full name: Shawn Fitzgerald Joseph McCoulsky
- Date of birth: 6 January 1997 (age 29)
- Place of birth: Lewisham, England
- Height: 6 ft 2 in (1.88 m)
- Position: Forward

Team information
- Current team: Harrogate Town
- Number: 9

Youth career
- –2014: Dulwich Hamlet

Senior career*
Years	Team	Apps	(Gls)
2014–2015	Dulwich Hamlet	13	(3)
2015	→ Walton Casuals (loan)	6	(1)
2015–2019	Bristol City	1	(0)
2016	→ Weston-super-Mare (loan)	12	(7)
2016	→ Torquay United (loan)	2	(0)
2017	→ Bath City (loan)	14	(8)
2017–2018	→ Newport County (loan)	27	(10)
2018–2019	→ Southend United (loan)	22	(4)
2019–2021	Forest Green Rovers	21	(0)
2019	→ Bromley (loan)	4	(1)
2019–2020	→ FC Halifax Town (loan)	5	(1)
2021–2022	Colchester United	5	(1)
2022–2025	Maidenhead United	120	(27)
2025–	Harrogate Town	23	(3)
- * Club domestic league appearances and goals as of 25 April 2026

Shawn Fitzgerald Joseph McCoulsky (born 6 January 1997) is an English professional footballer who plays as a forward for EFL League Two side Harrogate Town.

McCoulsky began his career with non-league side Dulwich Hamlet, and featured for Walton Casuals on loan in January 2015. After a move to Bristol City in November 2015, he spent time in the Under-23s before loan spells with Weston-super-Mare, Torquay United, Bath City, Newport County and Southend United. He made his professional debut in the EFL Cup in October 2016. He joined Forest Green Rovers in January 2019 and had two further loan spells at Bromley and FC Halifax Town. He joined Colchester United in 2021 following his release from Forest Green. On 25 January 2022, McCoulsky joined National League side Maidenhead United. In June 2025 he moved to Harrogate Town.

== Career ==
=== Dulwich Hamlet ===
McCoulsky began his career with the Aspire Academy, the youth section of Isthmian Premier Division club Dulwich Hamlet responsible for the development of George Elokobi and Simeon Jackson. He was called up to the club's first team ahead of the 2014–15 season.

On 13 September 2014, McCoulsky came off the bench to make his debut in a 3–0 defeat to Worthing. His second appearance for the club saw him claim an assist and the Man of the Match award, before scoring his first goal in a 2–0 victory over AFC Hornchurch the following game.

==== Walton Casuals (loan) ====
On 7 January 2015, he joined Isthmian Division One South outfit Walton Casuals on a one-month loan. Making six appearances for the Stags, he scored in his final game to complete a 3–1 victory over Whitstable Town.

=== Bristol City ===
At the end of the season, McCoulsky was invited to train with recently relegated Millwall, and also attracted interest from Premier League duo West Ham United and Southampton.

In October 2015, he went on trial with Bristol City and scored for the Under-21s. On 2 November, McCoulsky signed a professional contract with the Championship club and spent the season playing for the Under-23s.

On 25 October 2016, McCoulsky made his professional debut for Bristol City, coming off the bench to replace Gustav Engvall in a 2–1 EFL Cup defeat to Hull City.

==== Weston-super-Mare (loan) ====
On 4 August 2016, McCoulsky joined Weston-super-Mare on a two-month loan. Making his debut in a 3–1 win over Whitehawk, he scored the final goal and was named Man of the Match. He went on to score seven times in 12 appearances for the National League South side before returning to Bristol City in late October.

==== Torquay United (loan) ====
On 17 November 2016, he joined National League side Torquay United on a two-month loan. After just two substitute appearances in two months, McCoulsky was recalled by his parent club in January.

==== Bath City (loan) ====
On 3 February 2017, McCoulsky joined Bath City on loan for the remainder of the season. He scored his first goal for the club on 18 February in a 4–1 victory at St Albans City, and went on to score eight times for the National League South club.

McCoulsky was recalled in April ahead of a potential involvement in Bristol City's final league games of the season, but did not feature for the first team.

==== Newport County (loan) ====
On 28 July 2017, McCoulsky joined League Two side Newport County on a six-month loan. He made his debut for Newport on the opening day of the 2017–18 season, scoring an injury-time equaliser during a 3–3 draw with Stevenage. On 4 November 2017 McCoulsky scored the winning goal for Newport in the 2–1 FA Cup second round win against League One club Walsall. On 7 January 2018, he scored the winning goal in a 2–1 win over Championship club Leeds United in the third round of the FA Cup with an 89th minute header.

==== Southend United (loan) ====
On 10 August 2018, McCoulsky joined League One side Southend United on a season-long loan deal. McCoulsky scored on his debut for Southend in a 4–2 defeat to Championship side Brentford in the first round of the EFL Cup.

=== Forest Green Rovers ===
On 3 January 2019, McCoulsky signed for League Two outfit Forest Green Rovers on a two-and-a-half-year deal, following his loan recall back to Bristol City.

==== Bromley (loan) ====
On 19 August 2019, McCoulsky joined National League side Bromley on a month's loan.

==== FC Halifax Town (loan) ====
On 5 December 2019, McCoulsky joined National League side FC Halifax Town on a month's loan.

=== Colchester United ===
Following his release from Forest Green, McCoulsky signed a short-term deal with Rovers' League Two rivals Colchester United on 30 October 2021. He made his debut from the bench in Colchester's 4–0 FA Cup first round win against AFC Sudbury on 5 November, scoring the U's fourth goal in the third minute of stoppage time. On 3 January 2022, it was confirmed that McCoulsky had left the club following the end of his short-term contract.

=== Maidenhead United ===
On 25 January 2022, McCoulsky joined National League side Maidenhead United on an initial short-term deal until the end of the 2021–22 season. On 13 April 2024, McCoulsky scored a stoppage time winner against Gateshead to secure the Magpies another season in the National League. On 19 February 2025, he boosted Maidenhead's survival hopes with the only goal in a win at promotion-chasing Oldham. McCoulsky left the Magpies at the end of the 2024–25 season after scoring 32 goals for the Berkshire club.

=== Harrogate Town ===
On 5 June 2025, he joined EFL League Two side Harrogate Town on a two-year contract.

== Career statistics ==
As of 19 August 2025

Appearances and goals by club, season and competition
Club	Season	League			FA Cup		League Cup		Other		Total	
Club	Season	Division	Apps	Goals	Apps	Goals	Apps	Goals	Apps	Goals	Apps	Goals
Dulwich Hamlet	2014–15	Isthmian Premier Division	13	3	1	0	—		4 (Note: Two appearances and one goal in FA Trophy, one appearance in Isthmian League Cup, one appearance in London Senior Cup)	1	18	4
Walton Casuals (loan)	2014–15	Isthmian Division One South	6	1	—		—		—		6	1
Bristol City	2015–16	Championship	0	0	0	0	0	0	—		0	0
Bristol City	2016–17	Championship	0	0	0	0	1	0	—		1	0
Bristol City	2017–18	Championship	0	0	0	0	0	0	—		0	0
Bristol City	2018–19	Championship	0	0	0	0	0	0	—		0	0
Bristol City	Total		0	0	0	0	1	0	—		1	0
Weston-super-Mare (loan)	2016–17	National League South	12	7	—		—		—		12	7
Torquay United (loan)	2016–17	National League	2	0	—		—		1 (Note: Appearance in FA Trophy)	0	3	0
Bath City (loan)	2016–17	National League South	14	8	—		—		—		14	8
Newport County (loan)	2017–18	League Two	27	6	5	2	2	2	1 (Note: Appearances in EFL Trophy)	1	35	11
Southend United (loan)	2018–19	League One	15	0	2	0	1	2	4	2	22	4
Forest Green Rovers	2018–19	League Two	13	0	0	0	0	0	1 (Note: One Appearance in the League Two play-offs)	0	14	0
Forest Green Rovers	2019–20	League Two	6	0	0	0	1	0	1	0	8	0
Forest Green Rovers	2020–21	League Two	2	0	0	0	1	0	1	0	4	0
Forest Green Rovers	Total		21	0	0	0	2	0	3	0	26	0
Bromley (loan)	2019–20	National League	4	1	0	0	–		0	0	4	1
FC Halifax Town (loan)	2019–20	National League	5	1	0	0	–		1	0	6	1
Colchester United	2021–22	League Two	4	0	1	1	–		1	0	6	1
Maidenhead United	2021–22	National League	19	2	0	0	–		0	0	19	2
Maidenhead United	2022–23	National League	35	5	0	0	–		4 (Note: Three appearances and one goal in FA Trophy, one appearance in Berks & Bucks Senior Cup)	1	39	6
Maidenhead United	2023–24	National League	22	4	0	0	–		1 (Note: Appearances in Berks & Bucks Senior Cup)	3	23	7
Maidenhead United	2024–25	National League	44	15	3	1	–		2 (Note: Oneappearance in FA Trophy, one appearance and one goal in National League Cup)	1	49	17
Maidenhead United	Total		120	26	3	1	0	0	7	5	130	32
Harrogate Town	2025–26	League Two	19	1	0	0	1	0	0	0	5	1
Career total			247	54	12	4	7	2	22	9	288	71
