= Joseph Mills (footballer) =

Footballer (born 1989)

Personal information
- Full name: Joseph Nathan Mills
- Date of birth: 30 October 1989 (age 37)
- Place of birth: Swindon, England
- Height: 5 ft 9 in (1.75 m)
- Positions: Left back; left midfielder

Youth career
- Aston Villa
- 2006–2008: Southampton

Senior career*
Years	Team	Apps	(Gls)
2008–2011	Southampton	26	(0)
2009	→ Scunthorpe United (loan)	14	(0)
2010–2011	→ Doncaster Rovers (loan)	18	(2)
2011–2013	Reading	15	(0)
2012–2013	→ Burnley (loan)	10	(0)
2013–2014	Burnley	0	(0)
2013	→ Oldham Athletic (loan)	11	(0)
2014	→ Shrewsbury Town (loan)	13	(0)
2014–2016	Oldham Athletic	45	(1)
2016–2018	Perth Glory	44	(1)
2018–2020	Forest Green Rovers	68	(11)
2020–2022	Northampton Town	44	(0)
Total		308	(15)

International career
2004–2006	England U17	4	(0)
2006	England U18	2	(0)
- * Club domestic league appearances and goals

Joseph Nathan Mills (born 30 October 1989) is an English former professional footballer, who mainly played as a left back but also played as a left-sided midfielder.

== Career ==
=== Southampton ===
Born in Swindon, England, Mills started his football career at Aston Villa's academy before opting to move to Southampton in August 2006. At Southampton, alongside his brother Matthew, he progressed through the academy and reserve sides before being promoted to the first team ahead of the 2008–09 season.

He made his Southampton first team debut as substitute in a League Cup match against Birmingham City on 26 August 2008. He made his league debut at home against Barnsley on 20 September 2008.

After making a handful of appearances for Southampton, on 23 February 2009, he joined Scunthorpe United on an emergency loan for one month. Mills made his Scunthorpe United debut on 24 February 2009, where he made his first start, in a 2–0 loss against Southend United. On 24 March, the loan was extended to the end of the 2008–09 season. Although Mills played regularly as Scunthorpe finished in 6th Place, he tore a hamstring in the final match of the league season and missed the play-offs in which Scunthorpe secured promotion to the Championship.

After returning from a loan spell at Scunthorpe United, Mills signed a new three-year contract in August 2009 after some good pre-season performances, featuring sporadically during the 2009–10 season. However, Mills did play in Southampton's victorious Football League Trophy final against Carlisle United.

In the 2010–11 season, Mills lost his first team place under the management of Nigel Adkins and joined Doncaster Rovers on a one-month emergency loan deal on 19 October 2010, making his debut the same day in a 3–2 defeat by Derby County. This loan deal was then extended to 19 January 2011. Mills scored his first professional goal for Doncaster in a 3–0 victory over former loan club Scunthorpe United on 1 January 2011. Weeks later, on 15 January 2011, Mills was injured in Doncaster's 3–0 defeat to Reading and this may have been his last action for Doncaster. On 31 January 2011, the loan deal was extended until the end of the season. Mills then scored his second goal for the club on 1 March 2011, in a 3–1 win over Derby County. Mills later finished the season, making eighteen appearances and scoring two times.

In July 2011, he joined Preston North End on trial. Around the same time, Mills was a subject of a move to Doncaster Rovers on a permanent basis. His future at Southampton became increasingly in doubt after being left out of the squad for the pre-season tour in Switzerland.

=== Reading ===
On 22 August 2011, he joined Reading for an undisclosed fee, signing a one-year contract with the option of another year. Upon joining the club, Mills revealed his brother, Matthew, played a role that led him to join Reading, a club he left for Leicester City before Joseph arrived.

He made his first start for the Royals in a 2–1 defeat by Charlton Athletic, in the League Cup first round on 23 August 2011, coming off the bench for Ian Harte in the 62nd minute. Four days later, Mills made his league debut for Reading, in a 1–0 loss against Hull City. On 6 November 2011, Mills was announced as Man of the Match after Reading defeated Birmingham City 1–0 thanks to a Noel Hunt winner.

Mills signed a contract extension on 8 February 2012 keeping him at Reading until the end of the 2014 season. However, Mills suffered injuries that kept him out for most of the season. In his first season at Reading, Mills made fifteen appearances for the club.

=== Burnley ===
On 17 July 2012, Mills joined Burnley on a season long loan after falling down the pecking order at Reading.

He made his Burnley debut in the League Cup first round win over Port Vale and then made his first league appearance the following weekend in the 2–0 win against Bolton Wanderers. He went on to make 10 league appearances during the 2012–13 season, before joining Burnley permanently in the summer of 2013, signing a two-year contract.

=== Loan spells ===
On 16 August 2013, he joined League One side Oldham Athletic on a one-month loan deal. Mills made his Oldham Athletic debut the next day, in a 2–1 loss against Peterborough United. Mills soon extended his loan spell for the second and third time. Despite suffering from an injury, Mills went on to make eleven appearances for the club and returned to his parent club on 22 November 2013.

On 31 January 2014, Mills joined Shrewsbury Town on loan for the remainder of the 2013–14 season. Mills made his Shrewsbury Town debut the next day, coming on as a substitute for Paul Parry in the 82nd minute, in a 1–1 draw against Brentford. On 29 March 2014, Mills received a straight red card after a foul on James Chambers, in a 1–0 loss against Walsall. After an unsuccessful appeal over his suspension, Mills returned to the first team and made the total of thirteen appearances for the club.

=== Oldham Athletic ===
On 4 June 2014, Mills signed for Oldham Athletic where he had spent a loan spell the previous season. He signed a two-year contract with the option of a third and was the Latics first summer signing. Upon joining the club, Manager Lee Johnson said of the signing "It's a great signing. He's young, hungry and got a lot of potential. We'll give him an identity and a bit of love and I feel he can be a really good player for us." Upon signing for the club, Mills was given number three shirt ahead of a new season.

Mills' first game after signing for the club on a permanent basis came in the opening game of the season on 9 August 2014, where he played 90 minutes, in a 2–2 draw against Colchester United. On 16 September 2014, Mills then provided assist for James Dayton to score the first goal of the game, in a 2–2 draw against Swindon Town. Mills' performance was praised by Oldham Athletic supporters and was rewarded with October's Player of the Month and December's Player of the Month by supporters. However, Mills was soon sent-off in the 75th minute after making a tackle, in a 2–2 draw against Doncaster Rovers on 10 January 2015. Soon after, Mills was later sidelined injuries twice towards the end of the season. Despite this, Mills went on to make thirty appearances for the club.

In his second season at Oldham Athletic saw Mills regained his fitness and re-established himself in the first team. Mills scored his first Oldham Athletic goal on 5 September 2015, in a 2–1 loss against Bradford City. After suffering from ankle injury, Mills made his first team return on 31 October 2015, in a 1–0 loss against Burton Albion. Mills was expected to leave the club in January, but stayed at the club at the end of the season. Mills appeared in the handful of first team until he spent the rest of the season on the substitute bench, having his first team place and made fifteen appearances for the club.

At the end of the 2015–16 season, Mills was released by the club.

=== Perth Glory ===
On 18 May 2016, it was announced that Mills had signed for A-League side Perth Glory. Upon joining the club, he said moving to Australia was an opportunity he couldn't turn down. Following two years with Perth Glory, making 44 appearances with one goal, Mills left at the end of the 2017–18 season.

=== Forest Green Rovers ===
On 8 June 2018, Mills returned to English football when he signed for Forest Green Rovers on a two-year contract.

=== Northampton Town ===
Mills joined Northampton Town in August 2020. He scored his first goal for the club in an EFL Trophy tie against Milton Keynes Dons on 8 September 2020.

On 28 August 2021, in a 0–0 draw at Crawley, he was carried off the pitch with an ankle injury that was expected to prevent him playing for several months. On 26 January 2022, manager Jon Brady stated that Mills' return had been delayed following a setback. He retired at the end of the 2021–22 season.

== International career ==
Mills previously represented England U17 and England U18.

== Personal life ==
Mills is the younger brother of former Bolton Wanderers defender Matthew Mills and the two were teammates whilst playing for Forest Green Rovers. He was given the nickname 'Fish'. Mills is interested in cookery.

In early 2016, Mills became a father when his partner gave birth to a girl.

== Career statistics ==
Appearances and goals by club, season and competition
Club	Season	League			Cup		League Cup		Other		Total	
Club	Season	Division	Apps	Goals	Apps	Goals	Apps	Goals	Apps	Goals	Apps	Goals
Southampton	2008–09	Championship	8	0	0	0	2	0	—		10	0
Southampton	2009–10	League One	16	0	3	0	0	0	3 (Note: Appearances in Football League Trophy)	0	22	0
Southampton	2010–11	League One	2	0	—		1	0	0	0	3	0
Southampton	Total		26	0	3	0	3	0	3	0	35	0
Scunthorpe United (loan)	2008–09	League One	14	0	—		—		—		14	0
Doncaster Rovers (loan)	2010–11	Championship	18	2	1	0	—		—		19	2
Reading	2011–12 (Note: Soccerbase incorrectly credits Jack Mills with two appearances against Hull City and Charlton Athletic on 23 and 27 August 2011 respectively, that should instead be attributed to Joseph Mills as confirmed by the official match reports on the Reading website.)	Championship	15	0	0	0	1	0	—		16	0
Burnley (loan)	2012–13	Championship	10	0	0	0	2	0	—		12	0
Oldham Athletic (loan)	2013–14	League One	11	0	—		—		3	0	14	0
Shrewsbury Town (loan)	2013–14	League One	13	0	—		—		—		13	0
Oldham Athletic	2014–15	League One	30	0	2	0	1	0	3	0	36	0
Oldham Athletic	2015–16	League One	15	1	3	0	1	0	0	0	19	1
Oldham Athletic	Total		45	1	5	0	2	0	3	0	55	1
Perth Glory	2016–17	A-League	22	1	1	0	—		—		23	1
Perth Glory	2017–18	A-League	22	0	0	0	—		—		22	0
Perth Glory	Total		44	1	1	0	0	0	0	0	45	1
Forest Green Rovers	2018–19	League Two	44	4	1	0	1	0	2 (Note: Appearance(s) in League Two play-offs)	1	48	5
Forest Green Rovers	2019–20	League Two	24	7	2	1	2	0	0	0	28	8
Forest Green Rovers	Total		68	11	3	1	3	0	2	1	76	13
Northampton Town	2020–21	League One	27	0	0	0	1	0	3	2	31	2
Northampton Town	2021–22	League Two	17	0	0	0	1	0	2 (Note: Appearances in League Two play-offs)	0	20	0
Northampton Town	Total		44	0	0	0	2	0	5	2	51	2
Career total			308	15	13	1	13	0	16	3	349	19

== Honours ==
Southampton

- Football League Trophy: 2009–10

Reading

- Football League Championship: 2011–12
