= Isaac Pearce =

English footballer

Personal information
- Full name: Isaac Richard Kai Pearce
- Date of birth: 27 October 1998 (age 28)
- Place of birth: Bristol, England
- Height: 1.67 m (5 ft 6 in)
- Position: Striker

Team information
- Current team: Weston-super-Mare

Youth career
- Bristol Rovers
- 2015–2017: Fulham

Senior career*
| Years | Team | Apps | (Gls) |
| 2017–2018 | Fulham | 0 | (0) |
| 2017 | → Bath City (loan) | 2 | (0) |
| 2018 | → Larkhall Athletic (loan) | 1 | (2) |
| 2018–2019 | Forest Green Rovers | 4 | (0) |
| 2018–2019 | → Gloucester City (loan) | 4 | (0) |
| 2019– | Weston-super-Mare | 0 | (0) |
- * Club domestic league appearances and goals as of 16:02, 13 July 2019 (UTC)

Isaac Richard Kai Pearce (born 27 October 1998) is an English professional footballer who plays for Weston-super-Mare, as a striker.

== Career ==
Pearce was born in Bristol. After spending time with Bristol Rovers, Fulham, Bath City and Larkhall Athletic, Pearce signed for Forest Green Rovers in June 2018. He made his professional debut on 28 August 2018, in the EFL Cup, and he scored his first professional goal in a 4-0 EFL Trophy win over Cheltenham Town on 4 September 2018. In December 2018 he moved on loan to Gloucester City for one month. He returned to Forrest on 11 January 2019. He was released by Forest Green Rovers at the end of the 2018–19 season.

On 25 June 2019, Pearce signed for Southern Football League club Weston-super-Mare.
