= James Montgomery (footballer, born 1994) =

English footballer (born 1994)

Personal information
- Full name: James Hayden Montgomery
- Date of birth: 20 April 1994 (age 32)
- Place of birth: Sunderland, England
- Height: 6 ft 2 in (1.88 m)
- Position: Goalkeeper

Youth career
- Middlesbrough

Senior career*
| Years | Team | Apps | (Gls) |
| 2013–2014 | Guiseley | 0 | (0) |
| 2015–2017 | AFC Telford United | 66 | (0) |
| 2017–2018 | Gateshead | 38 | (0) |
| 2018–2019 | Forest Green Rovers | 18 | (0) |
| 2019–2020 | AFC Fylde | 13 | (0) |
| 2020–2021 | Gateshead | 7 | (0) |
| 2021 | → Southend United (loan) | 4 | (0) |
| 2021 | Chesterfield | 6 | (0) |
| 2022–2023 | Gateshead | 14 | (0) |
| 2023–2024 | Spennymoor Town | 26 | (0) |
| 2024 | → Gateshead (loan) | 7 | (0) |
| 2024 | Gateshead | 1 | (0) |
| Total | | 201 | (0) |

International career
| 2017–2018 | England C | 2 | (0) |
- * Club domestic league appearances and goals

James Hayden Montgomery (born 20 April 1994) is an English retired professional footballer who played as a goalkeeper.

== Early and personal life ==
Born in Sunderland, his grandfather was a cousin of footballer Jimmy Montgomery.

== Career ==
Montgomery began his career playing youth football for Middlesbrough. He then played in non-league with Guiseley, before attending the Nike Football Academy and signing with AFC Telford United in 2015. While with Telford he also began training with Sunderland (in July 2016), and with the V9 Academy (in November 2016). He moved to Gateshead in January 2017. Montgomery signed a two-year contract with Forest Green Rovers in May 2018. He made his professional debut on 14 August 2018, in the EFL Cup. During a match against Mansfield Town in January 2019, Montgomery collided with opposition player Gethin Jones, resulting in a cut lip and lost teeth. Montgomery was substituted by Lewis Ward.

In July 2019, Montgomery joined AFC Fylde on a two-year deal. He was released by the club in August 2020.

He returned to Gateshead in October 2020.

On 2 March 2021, Montgomery joined League Two side Southend United on an emergency seven-day loan following an injury to fellow goalkeeper Alex Bass. On 9 March 2021, the loan was extended for a further seven days.

On 15 April 2021, Montgomery joined National League side Chesterfield on a short-term deal. Montgomery's contract was not extended at the end of the season.

On 17 March 2022, Montgomery returned to former club Gateshead on a short-term contract. This would be his third spell at the National League North club. He played for Gateshead in the 2023 FA Trophy final defeat to FC Halifax Town at Wembley Stadium.

On 12 June 2023, Montgomery signed for National League North club Spennymoor Town having departed Gateshead in search of more regular first-team football as well as allowing him to devote more of his time to his new coaching role at Newcastle United.

He signed with Gateshead for a fourth time in his career on 20 February 2024, joining on an initial one-month loan deal following injury and sickness amongst Gateshead's two other goalkeepers. In March 2024, following his return to his parent club, Montgomery left The Moors by mutual consent. On 30 March, he re-signed for Gateshead, his fifth spell, on a deal until the end of the 2023–24 season. He started for Gateshead in the 2024 FA Trophy final victory against Solihull Moors. In the penalty shootout, Montgomery saved one penalty as Gateshead won 5–4.

On 13 July 2024, Montgomery announced his retirement from competitive football.

== Career statistics ==
Appearances and goals by club, season and competition
| Club | Season | League | | | FA Cup | | League Cup | | Other | | Total | |
| Club | Season | Division | Apps | Goals | Apps | Goals | Apps | Goals | Apps | Goals | Apps | Goals |
|---|---|---|---|---|---|---|---|---|---|---|---|---|
| AFC Telford United | 2014–15 | Conference Premier | 7 | 0 | 0 | 0 | — | | 0 | 0 | 7 | 0 |
| AFC Telford United | 2015–16 | National League North | 33 | 0 | 0 | 0 | — | | 1 (Note: Appearance(s) in FA Trophy) | 0 | 34 | 0 |
| AFC Telford United | 2016–17 | National League North | 26 | 0 | 0 | 0 | — | | 1 | 0 | 27 | 0 |
| AFC Telford United | Total | | 66 | 0 | 0 | 0 | 0 | 0 | 2 | 0 | 68 | 0 |
| Gateshead | 2016–17 | National League | 12 | 0 | 0 | 0 | — | | 0 | 0 | 12 | 0 |
| Gateshead | 2017–18 | National League | 26 | 0 | 1 | 0 | — | | 7 | 0 | 34 | 0 |
| Gateshead | Total | | 38 | 0 | 1 | 0 | 0 | 0 | 7 | 0 | 46 | 0 |
| Forest Green Rovers | 2018–19 | League Two | 18 | 0 | 2 | 0 | 2 | 0 | 3 (Note: Appearance(s) in EFL Trophy) | 0 | 25 | 0 |
| AFC Fylde | 2019–20 | National League | 13 | 0 | 1 | 0 | — | | 0 | 0 | 14 | 0 |
| Gateshead | 2020–21 | National League North | 7 | 0 | 0 | 0 | — | | 0 | 0 | 7 | 0 |
| Southend United (loan) | 2020–21 | League Two | 4 | 0 | 0 | 0 | 0 | 0 | 0 | 0 | 4 | 0 |
| Chesterfield | 2020–21 | National League | 7 | 0 | 0 | 0 | — | | 0 | 0 | 7 | 0 |
| Gateshead | 2021–22 | National League North | 0 | 0 | 0 | 0 | — | | 0 | 0 | 0 | 0 |
| Gateshead | 2022–23 | National League | 14 | 0 | 1 | 0 | — | | 6 | 0 | 21 | 0 |
| Gateshead | Total | | 14 | 0 | 1 | 0 | 0 | 0 | 6 | 0 | 21 | 0 |
| Spennymoor Town | 2023–24 | National League North | 26 | 0 | 2 | 0 | — | | 0 | 0 | 28 | 0 |
| Gateshead (loan) | 2023–24 | National League | 8 | 0 | 0 | 0 | — | | 3 | 0 | 11 | 0 |
| Career total | | | 201 | 0 | 7 | 0 | 2 | 0 | 21 | 0 | 231 | 0 |

== Honours ==
Gateshead

- FA Trophy: 2023–24; runner-up: 2022–23
