= Jordan Simpson (footballer, born 1998) =

English footballer (born 1998)

Personal information
- Full name: Jordan Tyler Simpson
- Date of birth: 28 November 1998 (age 27)
- Place of birth: Swindon, England
- Position: Midfielder

Team information
- Current team: Ashton United

Youth career
- 2004–2017: Swindon Town

Senior career*
Years	Team	Apps	(Gls)
2017	Swindon Town	0	(0)
2017–2019	Forest Green Rovers	1	(0)
2017	→ Hungerford Town (loan)	9	(0)
2018	→ Havant & Waterlooville (loan)	2	(0)
2019	→ Hampton & Richmond Borough (loan)	4	(0)
2019–2020	Bath City	6	(0)
2020–2021	FC United of Manchester	13	(1)
2021	Macclesfield	6	(0)
2021–	Ashton United	17	(1)
- * Club domestic league appearances and goals as of 22:24, 3 May 2022 (UTC)

Jordan Tyler Simpson (born 28 November 1998) is an English professional footballer who plays for Ashton United as a midfielder.

== Club career ==
Son of former Jamaican international, Fitzroy Simpson, Simpson joined local side Swindon Town at the age of six in 2004 and signed his first professional contract in March 2017 along with Scott Twine and Tommy Ouldridge. Five days after signing, Simpson featured as an unused substitute during Swindon's 4–2 home defeat against Sheffield United.

Following the appointment of David Flitcroft, Simpson was free to leave Swindon and in July 2017 he joined newly promoted Forest Green Rovers on a two-year deal. On 1 September 2017, Simpson joined National League South side Hungerford Town on a short-term loan. A day later, he made his debut in their 2–0 home victory over Concord Rangers, replacing Louie Soares in the 69th minute.

Following a loan spell at Hungerford, Simpson made his Forest Green debut in their 2–0 home defeat against Luton Town, playing the full 90 minutes.

On 6 September 2018, Simpson joined National League side, Havant & Waterlooville on a one-month loan and made his debut during a 3–2 defeat to Harrogate Town two days later.

On 22 March 2019, Simpson joined National League South side, Hampton & Richmond Borough on loan for the remainder of the campaign and went onto feature four times before returning to Forest Green in May. He was released by Forest Green Rovers at the end of the 2018–19 season.

On 19 June 2019, Simpson signed for Bath City.

On 23 October 2020 F.C. United of Manchester announced that Simpson had signed for the club. Simpspn made his debut on 24 October in the 4th qualifying round of the FA Cup against Guiseley A.F.C. where F.C. United won 2–1 to qualify for the first round proper of the competition.

In October 2021 he joined Macclesfield after his release from FC United.

On 16 December 2021, Simpson signed for Northern Premier League Premier Division side Ashton United.

== Career statistics ==
As of 22 April 2019

Appearances and goals by club, season and competition
Club	Season	League			FA Cup		EFL Cup		Other		Total	
Club	Season	Division	Apps	Goals	Apps	Goals	Apps	Goals	Apps	Goals	Apps	Goals
Swindon Town	2016–17	League One	0	0	0	0	0	0	0	0	0	0
Forest Green Rovers	2017–18	League Two	1	0	0	0	0	0	1 (Note: Appearance(s) in EFL Trophy)	0	2	0
Forest Green Rovers	2018–19	League Two	0	0	0	0	0	0	0	0	0	0
Forest Green Rovers	Total		1	0	0	0	0	0	1	0	2	0
Hungerford Town (loan)	2017–18	National League South	9	0	3	0	—		0	0	12	0
Havant & Waterlooville (loan)	2018–19	National League	2	0	0	0	—		0	0	2	0
Hampton & Richmond Borough (loan)	2018–19	National League South	4	0	0	0	—		0	0	4	0
Career total			16	0	3	0	0	0	1	0	20	0
