= List of Forest Green Rovers F.C. seasons =

Forest Green Rovers Football Club is an English football club based in Nailsworth, Gloucestershire. The club is affiliated to the Gloucestershire County FA.

== Early history ==
Forest Green Rovers was founded in October 1889 by the local Nonconformist church minister. In 1894, Forest Green Rovers became founding members of the "Mid Gloucestershire League", the first association football league in the county outside Bristol. After MGL folding in 1902, Forest Green become members of the newly formed Stroud League and also members of the Dursley and District League which they won in 1903, the club's first silverware. The Rovers first team competed in two leagues almost every season from 1900 until 1922 and again from 1928 until 1937. (This was quite common with leagues generally not having as many teams as those today).

After a break for the Great War, Rovers enjoyed a period of great success winning two football leagues and three cups in both 1921 and 1922. They then joined the newly formed Gloucestershire Northern Senior League with Cheltenham Town among others in 1922.

Rovers joined the newly formed County League in 1968 and played under manager Peter Goring, (the ex-Arsenal number 6), for the next 11 years moving up again to the Hellenic League in 1975 under Peter's stewardship.

== Key ==
Key to league record

- Level = Level of the league in the current league system
- Pld = Games played
- W = Games won
- D = Games drawn
- L = Games lost
- GF = Goals for
- GA = Goals against
- GD = Goals difference
- Pts = Points
- Position = Position in the final league table
- Top scorer and number of goals scored shown in bold when he was also top scorer for the division. Number of goals includes goals scored in play-offs.

Key to cup records

- Res = Final reached round
- Rec = Final club record in the form of wins-draws-losses
- PR = Preliminary round
- QR1 (2, etc.) = Qualifying Cup rounds
- G = Group stage
- R1 (2, etc.) = Proper Cup rounds
- QF = Quarter-finalists
- SF = Semi-finalists
- F = Finalists
- A (QF, SF, F) = Area quarter-, semi-, finalists
- W = Winners

== Seasons ==
List of Forest Green Rovers seasons starting since their moving to Hellenic League in 1975.

| Year | League | Lvl | Pld | W | D | L | GF | GA | GD | Pts | Position | Leading league scorer(s) | | FA Cup | | EFL Cup | | EFL Trophy | | FA Trophy | | Average home attendance (Note: Average home attendance = for league games only) |
| Year | League | Lvl | Pld | W | D | L | GF | GA | GD | Pts | Position | Name(s) | Goals | Res | Rec | Res | Rec | Res | Rec | Res | Rec | Average home attendance |
|---|---|---|---|---|---|---|---|---|---|---|---|---|---|---|---|---|---|---|---|---|---|---|
| 1975–76 | **Hellenic Football League**; **Premier Division** | 8 | 30 | 14 | 10 | 6 | 82 | 53 | +29 | 52* | **4th of 16** | | | | | | | | | | | |
| 1976–77 | **Hellenic Football League**; **Premier Division** | 8 | 30 | 8 | 9 | 13 | 44 | 50 | −6 | 33* | **11th of 16** | | | | | | | | | | | |
| 1977–78 | **Hellenic Football League**; **Premier Division** | 8 | 30 | 6 | 12 | 12 | 49 | 59 | −10 | 24* | **12th of 16** | | | QR2 | 1–0–1 | | | | | | | |
| 1978–79 | **Hellenic Football League**; **Premier Division** | 8 | 26 | 15 | 4 | 7 | 52 | 35 | +17 | 34* | **3rd of 14** | | | QR1 | 1–0–1 | | | | | | | |
| 1979–80 | **Hellenic Football League**; **Premier Division** | 8 | 30 | 11 | 10 | 9 | 56 | 45 | +11 | 32* | **6th of 16** | | | QR2 | 1–0–1 | | | | | | | |
| 1980–81 | **Hellenic Football League**; **Premier Division** | 8 | 30 | 14 | 6 | 10 | 57 | 53 | +4 | 34* | **7th of 16** | | | QR1 | 1–2–1 | | | | | | | |
| 1981–82 | **Hellenic Football League**; **Premier Division** | 8 | 30 | 23 | 1 | 6 | 71 | 20 | +51 | 47* | **1st of 16**; Promoted | | | QR1 | 0–0–1 | | | | | | | |
| 1982–83 | **Southern Football League**; **Midland Division** | 7 | 32 | 21 | 3 | 8 | 68 | 32 | +36 | 66 | **3rd of 17** | | | QR1 | 0–0–1 | | | | | | | |
| 1983–84 | **Southern Football League**; **Midland Division** | 7 | 38 | 15 | 12 | 11 | 67 | 51 | +16 | 57 | **11th of 20** | | | QR2 | 1–1–1 | | | | | PR | 0–1–1 | |
| 1984–85 | **Southern Football League**; **Midland Division** | 7 | 34 | 9 | 10 | 15 | 49 | 65 | −16 | 37 | **14th of 18** | | | QR1 | 1–0–1 | | | | | QR3 | 2–1–1 | |
| 1985–86 | **Southern Football League**; **Midland Division** | 7 | 40 | 14 | 9 | 17 | 52 | 56 | −4 | 51 | **14th of 21** | | | QR1 | 1–0–1 | | | | | QR1 | 0–0–1 | |
| 1986–87 | **Southern Football League**; **Midland Division** | 7 | 38 | 16 | 9 | 13 | 65 | 53 | +12 | 57 | **9th of 20** | | | QR3 | 2–0–1 | | | | | QR1 | 0–0–1 | |
| 1987–88 | **Southern Football League**; **Midland Division** | 7 | 42 | 14 | 16 | 12 | 67 | 54 | +13 | 58 | **9th of 22** | | | QR3 | 2–0–1 | | | | | QR3 | 2–0–1 | |
| 1988–89 | **Southern Football League**; **Midland Division** | 7 | 42 | 12 | 16 | 14 | 64 | 67 | −3 | 52 | **12th of 22** | | | QR3 | 2–0–1 | | | | | QR1 | 0–0–1 | |
| 1989–90 | **Southern Football League**; **Midland Division** | 7 | 42 | 16 | 13 | 13 | 75 | 62 | +13 | 61 | **10th of 22** | | | QR2 | 1–1–1 | | | | | QR3 | 2–0–1 | |
| 1990–91 | **Southern Football League**; **Midland Division** | 7 | 42 | 11 | 14 | 17 | 51 | 64 | −13 | 47 | **18th of 22** | | | QR2 | 2–1–1 | | | | | R3 | 5–1–1 | |
| 1991–92 | **Southern Football League**; **Midland Division** | 7 | 42 | 14 | 4 | 24 | 66 | 88 | −22 | 46 | **19th of 22** | | | QR1 | 0–0–1 | | | | | QR3 | 0–0–1 | |
| 1992–93 | **Southern Football League**; **Midland Division** | 7 | 42 | 12 | 6 | 24 | 61 | 97 | −36 | 42 | **19th of 22** | | | QR1 | 1–0–1 | | | | | | | |
| 1993–94 | **Southern Football League**; **Midland Division** | 7 | 42 | 12 | 12 | 18 | 61 | 84 | −23 | 48 | **15th of 22** | | | QR1 | 0–1–1 | | | | | | | |
| 1994–95 | **Southern Football League**; **Midland Division** | 7 | 42 | 11 | 13 | 18 | 56 | 76 | −20 | 46 | **18th of 22** | | | PR | 0–1–1 | | | | | QR2 | 1–1–1 | |
| 1994–95 | **Southern Football League**; **Midland Division** | 7 | Club transferred. | | | | | | | | | | | PR | 0–1–1 | | | | | QR2 | 1–1–1 | |
| 1995–96 | **Southern Football League**; **Southern Division** | 7 | 42 | 22 | 8 | 12 | 85 | 55 | +30 | 74 | **8th of 22** | | | QR3 | 3–2–1 | | | | | QR1 | 0–0–1 | |
| 1996–97 | **Southern Football League**; **Southern Division** | 7 | 42 | 27 | 10 | 5 | 87 | 40 | +47 | 91 | **1st of 22**; Promoted | | | QR1 | 0–0–1 | | | | | QR2 | 1–0–1 | |
| 1997–98 | **Southern Football League**; **Premier Division** | 6 | 42 | 27 | 8 | 7 | 93 | 55 | +38 | 89 | **1st of 22**; Promoted | | | QR2 | 1–0–1 | | | | | QR2 | 0–0–1 | |
| 1998–99 | **Conference**; **National** | 5 | 42 | 15 | 13 | 14 | 55 | 50 | +5 | 58 | **12th of 22** | Marc McGregor | 12 | QR3 | 0–0–1 | | | | | RU | 6–1–1 | 854 |
| 1999–2000 | **Conference**; **National** | 5 | 42 | 13 | 8 | 21 | 54 | 63 | −9 | 47 | **19th of 22** | Marc McGregor | 12 | R2 | 2–0–1 | | | | | R4 | 2–0–1 | 975 |
| 2000–01 | **Conference**; **National** | 5 | 42 | 11 | 15 | 16 | 43 | 54 | −11 | 48 | **16th of 22** | Alex Meechan | 13 | R1 | 1–0–1 | | | | | RU | 5–2–1 | 862 |
| 2001–02 | **Conference**; **National** | 5 | 42 | 12 | 15 | 15 | 54 | 76 | −22 | 51 | **18th of 22** | Mark Cooper | 17 | R1 | 1–2–0 | | | | | R5 | 2–1–1 | 841 |
| 2002–03 | **Conference**; **National** | 5 | 42 | 17 | 8 | 17 | 61 | 62 | −1 | 59 | **9th of 22** | Neil Grayson | 15 | R1 | 1–1–1 | | | | | QF | 3–0–1 | 858 |
| 2003–04 | **Conference**; **National** | 5 | 42 | 12 | 12 | 18 | 58 | 80 | −22 | 48 | **18th of 22** | Scott Rogers; Neil Grayson | 9 | QR4 | 0–0–1 | | | | | R4 | 1–1–1 | 902 |
| 2004–05 | **Conference**; **National** | 5 | 42 | 6 | 15 | 21 | 41 | 81 | −40 | 33 | **20th of 22** | Charlie Griffin | 17 | R1 | 1–1–1 | | | | | R3 | 0–0–1 | 743 |
| 2004–05 | **Conference**; **National** | 5 | Reprieved from relegation due to Northwich Victoria demotion. | | | | | | | | | | | R1 | 1–1–1 | | | | | R3 | 0–0–1 | 743 |
| 2005–06 | **Conference**; **National** | 5 | 42 | 8 | 14 | 20 | 49 | 62 | −13 | 38 | **19th of 22** | Paul Wanless | 10 | QR4 | 0–0–1 | | | | | R3 | 2–0–1 | 977 |
| 2006–07 | **Conference**; **National** | 5 | 46 | 13 | 18 | 15 | 59 | 64 | −5 | 57 | **14th of 24** | Simon Clist; Danny Carey-Bertram | 7 | QR4 | 0–0–1 | | | | | R1 | 0–0–1 | 1,185 |
| 2007–08 | **Conference**; **National** | 5 | 46 | 19 | 14 | 13 | 76 | 59 | +17 | 71 | **8th of 24** | Stuart Fleetwood | 27 | R2 | 2–2–1 | | | | | R2 | 1–0–1 | 1,178 |
| 2008–09 | **Conference**; **National** | 5 | 46 | 12 | 16 | 18 | 70 | 76 | −6 | 52 | **18th of 24** | Andy Mangan | 26 | R3 | 3–1–1 | | | | | QF | 3–0–1 | 955 |
| 2009–10 | **Conference**; **National** | 5 | 44 | 12 | 9 | 23 | 50 | 76 | −26 | 45 | **21st of 23** | Jonathan Smith | 8 | R3 | 3–1–1 | | | | | R1 | 0–0–1 | 1,012 |
| 2009–10 | **Conference**; **National** | 5 | Reprieved from relegation due to Salisbury City demotion. | | | | | | | | | | | R3 | 3–1–1 | | | | | R1 | 0–0–1 | 1,012 |
| 2010–11 | **Conference**; **National** | 5 | 46 | 10 | 16 | 20 | 53 | 72 | −19 | 46 | **20th of 24** | Reece Styche | 15 | R1 | 1–0–1 | | | | | R1 | 0–0–1 | 949 |
| 2011–12 | **Conference**; **National** | 5 | 46 | 19 | 13 | 14 | 66 | 45 | +21 | 70 | **10th of 24** | Yan Klukowski | 18 | QR4 | 0–0–1 | | | | | R1 | 0–1–1 | 1,034 |
| 2012–13 | **Conference**; **National** | 5 | 46 | 18 | 11 | 17 | 63 | 49 | +14 | 65 | **10th of 24** | James Norwood | 15 | R1 | 1–1–1 | | | | | R2 | 1–0–1 | 1,202 |
| 2013–14 | **Conference**; **National** | 5 | 46 | 19 | 10 | 17 | 80 | 66 | +14 | 67 | **10th of 24** | James Norwood | 18 | QR41 | 0–0–1 | | | | | R2 | 1–3–0 | 1,194 |
| 2014–15 | **Conference**; **National** | 5 | 46 | 22 | 16 | 8 | 80 | 54 | +26 | 79 | **5th of 24** | Jon Parkin | 25 | QR1 | 1–1–1 | | | | | R2 | 1–3–0 | 1,502 |
| 2014–15 | **Conference**; **National** | 5 | Lost in the play-off semifinal. | | | | | | | | | | | QR1 | 1–1–1 | | | | | R2 | 1–3–0 | 1,502 |
Fifth and sixth tier divisions renamed.
| 2015–16 | **National**; **League** | 5 | 46 | 26 | 11 | 9 | 69 | 42 | +27 | 89 | **2nd of 24** | Jon Parkin | 13 | R2 | 2–0–1 | | | | | R1 | 0–0–1 | 1,758 |
| 2015–16 | **National**; **League** | 5 | Lost in the play-off final. | | | | | | | | | | | R2 | 2–0–1 | | | | | R1 | 0–0–1 | 1,758 |
| 2016–17 | **National**; **League** | 5 | 46 | 25 | 11 | 10 | 88 | 56 | +32 | 86 | **3rd of 24** | Christian Doidge | 25 | QR4 | 0–0–1 | | | | | R3 | 2–1–1 | 1,753 |
| 2016–17 | **National**; **League** | 5 | Promoted after winning the play-offs. | | | | | | | | | | | QR4 | 0–0–1 | | | | | R3 | 2–1–1 | 1,753 |
| 2017–18 | **EFL**; **League Two** | 4 | 46 | 13 | 8 | 25 | 54 | 77 | -23 | 47 | **21st of 24** | Christian Doidge | 20 | R2 | 1–1–1 | R1 | 0–0–1 | R3 | 3–0–2 | | | 2,771 |
| 2018–19 | **EFL**; **League Two** | 4 | 46 | 20 | 14 | 12 | 68 | 47 | +21 | 74 | **5th of 24** | Christian Doidge | 14 | R1 | 0–1–1 | R2 | 1–1–0 | G | 1–1–1 | | | 2,775 |
| 2018–19 | **EFL**; **League Two** | 4 | Lost in the play-off semi-final. | | | | | | | | | | | R1 | 0–1–1 | R2 | 1–1–0 | G | 1–1–1 | | | 2,775 |
| 2019–20 | **EFL**; **League Two** | 4 | 36 | 13 | 10 | 13 | 43 | 40 | +3 | 49 | **10th of 24** | Joseph Mills | 7 | R2 | 1–1–1 | R2 | 0–2–0 | G | 1–1–1 | | | |
| 2020–21 | **EFL**; **League Two** | 4 | 46 | 20 | 13 | 13 | 59 | 51 | +8 | 73 | **6th of 24** | Jamille Matt | 17 | R1 | 0–0–1 | R1 | 0–0–1 | R2 | 1–1–2 | | | |
| 2020–21 | **EFL**; **League Two** | 4 | Lost in the play-off semi-final. | | | | | | | | | | | R1 | 0–0–1 | R1 | 0–0–1 | R2 | 1–1–2 | | | |
| 2021–22 | **EFL**; **League Two** | 4 | 46 | 23 | 15 | 8 | 75 | 44 | +31 | 84 | **1st of 24** | Mathew Stevens | 23 | R1 | 0–0–1 | R2 | 0–1–1 | R2 | 1-2-1 | | | 2,687 |
| 2021–22 | **EFL**; **League Two** | 4 | Promoted as EFL League Two Champions | | | | | | | | | | | R1 | 0–0–1 | R2 | 0–1–1 | R2 | 1-2-1 | | | 2,687 |
| 2022–23 | **EFL League One** | 3 | 46 | 6 | 9 | 31 | 31 | 89 | -58 | 27 | 24th of 24 | Connor Wickham | 6 | R3 | 2–2–1 | R2 | 1–1–1 | R2 | 1–1–1 | | | 3,179 |
| 2022–23 | **EFL League One** | 3 | Relegated to EFL League Two | | | | | | | | | | | R3 | 2–2–1 | R2 | 1–1–1 | R2 | 1–1–1 | | | 3,179 |
| 2023–24 | **EFL League Two** | 4 | 46 | 11 | 9 | 26 | 44 | 78 | -34 | 42 | 24th of 24 | Matthew Stevens | 9 | R2 | 2–2–1 | R1 | 1–1–1 | R2 | 1–1–1 | | | 2,473 |
| 2023–24 | **EFL League Two** | 4 | Relegated to National League | | | | | | | | | | | R2 | 2–2–1 | R1 | 1–1–1 | R2 | 1–1–1 | | | 2,473 |
| 2024–25 | **National League** | 5 | 46 | 22 | 17 | 7 | 69 | 42 | 27 | 83 | 3rd of 24 | Christian Doidge | 12 | R1 | 1–0–1 | | | | | R5 | 1–1–1 | 1,835 |
| 2024–25 | **National League** | 5 | Lost in the play-off quarter-final. | | | | | | | | | | | R1 | 1–0–1 | | | | | R5 | 1–1–1 | 1,835 |
| 2025–26 | **National League** | 5 | TBD | | | | | | | | | | | | | | | | | | | |
| 2026–27 | TBD | | | | | | | | | | | | | | | | | | | | | |

^{*} – two points for win.

== Overall stats ==
| Years | Competition | Level | S | Pld | W | D | L | GF | GA | GD | Pts |
|---|---|---|---|---|---|---|---|---|---|---|---|
| 1975–76 - 1981–82 | Hellenic Football League; Premier Division | 8 | 7 | 206 | 91 | 52 | 63 | 411 | 315 | +96 | 256* |
| 1982–83 - 1996–97 | Southern Football League; Midland/Southern Division | 7 | 15 | 602 | 226 | 155 | 221 | 974 | 944 | +30 | 833 |
| 1997–98 | Southern Football League; Premier Division | 6 | 1 | 42 | 27 | 8 | 7 | 93 | 55 | +38 | 89 |
| 1998–99 - 2016–17, 2024-25 | Conference National/National League | 5 | 19 | 840 | 289 | 245 | 306 | 1169 | 1187 | −18 | 1112 |
| 2017–18 - 2021–22, 2023-24 | EFL League Two | 4 | 5 | 220 | 89 | 60 | 71 | 299 | 259 | +40 | 327 |
| 2022–23 | EFL League One | 3 | 1 | - | - | - | - | - | - | - | - |
| 1977–78 - 2017–18 | FA Cup | – | 41 | 101 | 41 | 20 | 40 | | | | – |
| 1983–84 - 2016–17 | FA Trophy | – | 32 | 90 | 43 | 17 | 30 | | | | – |

^{*} – two points for win.

== First squad players ==
Eleven players who have the greatest number of league appearances in first team squad.

| Year | Goalkeepers | Defenders | Midfielders | Strikers |
|---|---|---|---|---|
| 1998/99 | Justin Shuttlewood | Mike Kilgour; Jason Drysdale; Ian Hedges; Chris Honor | Rob Cook; Don Forbes; Nathan Wigg; Danny Bailey | Marc McGregor; Alex Sykes |
| 1999/2000 | Steve Perrin | Billy Clark; Jason Drysdale; Ian Hedges; Wayne Hatswell | Chris Burns; Don Forbes; Tony Daley; Danny Bailey | Marc McGregor; Alex Sykes |
| 2000/01 | Steve Perrin | Billy Clark; Jason Drysdale; Dave Norton; Wayne Hatswell | Chris Burns; Robin Cousins; Tony Daley; Stuart Slater | Adrian Foster; Alex Meechan |
| 2001/02 | Steve Perrin | Simon Travis; Kevin Langan; Stephen Jenkins; Jamie Impey | Mark Shaw; Robin Cousins; Martin Foster; Mark Cooper | Carl Heggs; Alex Meechan |
| 2002/03 | Steve Perrin | Matthew Russell; Kevin Langan; Stephen Jenkins | Gary Owers; Alex Sykes; Martin Foster; John Richardson | Neil Grayson; Kayode Odejayi; Alex Meechan |
| 2003/04 | Steve Perrin | Denny Ingram; Lee Phillips; Gareth Stoker | Scott Rogers; Damon Searle; Martin Foster; John Richardson | Neil Grayson; Steve Cowe; Alex Meechan |
| 2004/05 | Dean Williams / Steve Perrin | Des Lyttle; Adam Garner; Matt Gadsby; Stuart Roberts | Scott Rogers; Damon Searle; Chris Davies; John Richardson | Charlie Griffin; Mark Beesley |
| 2005/06 | Ryan Clarke | Abdul Sall; Sekani Simpson; Matt Gadsby; Luke Graham | Paul Wanless; Damon Searle; John Richardson | Alex Meechan; Julian Alsop; Guy Madjo |
| 2006/07 | Ryan Robinson | Darren Jones; Kevin Nicholson; John Hardiker | Michael Brough; Les Afful; Alex Lawless; Simon Clist | Alex Meechan; Mark Beesley; Saul Williams |
| 2007/08 | Ryan Robinson | Darren Jones; Paul Stonehouse; Anthony Tonkin; John Hardiker | Michael Brough; Jamie Pitman; Alex Lawless; Simon Clist | Stuart Fleetwood; Chris Giles |
| 2008/09 | Terry Burton | Darren Jones; Paul Stonehouse; Jerry Gill; Mark Preece | Jonathan Smith; Lee Fowler; Alex Lawless; Simon Clist | Conal Platt; Andy Mangan |
| 2009/10 | Terry Burton | Jared Hodgkiss; Paul Stonehouse; Ollie Thorne; Mark Preece | Jonathan Smith; Daniel Powell; Isaiah Rankin | Conal Platt; David Brown; Tomi Ameobi |
| 2010/11 | James Bittner | Jared Hodgkiss; Luke Jones; Gavin Caines; Craig Armstrong | Yan Klukowski; Kieron Forbes; Wayne Turk; Curtis McDonald | Ross Dyer; Reece Styche |
| 2011/12 | James Bittner / Sam Russell | Jared Hodgkiss; Eddie Oshodi; Jamie Turley; Chris Stokes | Yan Klukowski; Kieron Forbes; James Rowe; Luke Graham | James Norwood; Matty Taylor |
| 2012/13 | Sam Russell | Jared Hodgkiss; Eddie Oshodi; Jamie Turley; Chris Stokes | Yan Klukowski; Kieron Forbes; Al Bangura; Aarran Racine | James Norwood; Matthew Taylor |
| 2013/14 | Sam Russell | Jared Hodgkiss; Eddie Oshodi; Dale Bennett; Paul Green | Yan Klukowski; Marcus Kelly; Al Bangura; Anthony Barry | James Norwood; Danny Wright |
| 2014/15 | Sam Russell | Rob Sinclair; Danny Coles; Clovis Kamdjo; Dale Bennett | Elliott Frear; Marcus Kelly; David Pipe | Jon Parkin; James Norwood; Kurtis Guthrie |
| 2015/16 | Steve Arnold | Dale Bennett; Aarran Racine; Darren Carter; James Jennings | Elliott Frear; Keanu Marsh-Brown; Rob Sinclair; Sam Wedgbury | Jon Parkin; Kurtis Guthrie |
| 2016/17 | Sam Russell | Dale Bennett; Ethan Pinnock; Dan Wishart; Charlie Clough | Liam Noble; Drissa Traoré; Darren Carter; Charlie Cooper | Christian Doidge; Keanu Marsh-Brown |
| 2017/18 | Bradley Collins | Dale Bennett; Scott Laird; Lee Collins; Manny Monthé | Drissa Traoré; Keanu Marsh-Brown; Liam Noble; Reece Brown | Christian Doidge; Omar Bugiel |
| 2018/19 | James Montgomery/ Robert Sánchez | Joseph Mills; Farrend Rawson; Gavin Gunning; Nathan McGinley | Carl Winchester; Reece Brown; Liam Shephard; Lloyd James | Christian Doidge; George Williams |
| 2019/20 | Lewis Thomas | Farrend Rawson; Liam Kitching; Joseph Mills; Matt Mills | Carl Winchester; Ebou Adams; Liam Shephard; Dom Bernard | Jack Aitchison; Matty Stevens |
| 2020/21 | Luke McGee | Kane Wilson; Jordan Moore-Taylor; Chris Stokes; Udoka Godwin-Malife | Dan Sweeney; Ebou Adams; Nicky Cadden; Odin Bailey | Aaron Collins; Jamille Matt |
| 2021/22 | Luke McGee | Kane Wilson; Jordan Moore-Taylor; Baily Cargill; Dom Bernard | Ben Stevenson; Nicky Cadden; Ebou Adams; Regan Hendry | Jamille Matt; Matty Stevens |
| 2022/23 | Luke McGee/ Ross Doohan | Oliver Casey; Dom Bernard; Jamie Robson; Brandon Cooper | Corey O'Keeffe; Ben Stevenson; Kyle McAllister; Dylan McGeouch | Myles Peart-Harris; Josh March |
| 2023/24 | Luke Daniels/ Vicente Reyes | Jamie Robson; Ryan Inniss; Jordan Moore-Taylor; Dom Bernard | Charlie McCann; Harvey Bunker; Fankaty Dabo; Emmanuel Osadebe | Kyle McAllister; Matty Stevens |
