= 2014–15 Newport County A.F.C. season =

Welsh association football club season

Newport County
2014–15 season
- Chairman: Les Scadding
- Manager: Justin Edinburgh (until 7 February 2015); Jimmy Dack (from 7 February 2015)
- Stadium: Rodney Parade
- League Two: 9th
- FA Cup: First round
- League Cup: First round
- League Trophy: First round
- Top goalscorer: League: Aaron O'Connor (11); All: Aaron O'Connor (12)
- Highest home attendance: 5,020 vs Plymouth Argyle (26 December 2014)
- Lowest home attendance: 1,882 vs Swindon Town (23 September 2014) Football League Trophy round 1
- Average home league attendance: 3,213
Home colours	Away colours	Third colours

The 2014–15 season was Newport County's second consecutive season in Football League Two, 62nd season in the Football League and 94th season of league football overall. They finished the season in 9th place, narrowly missing out on the play-offs.

== Season Review ==
=== League ===
The season started with three straight league defeats, including a 3–2 defeat at Morecambe where County were leading 2–0 at half time. However, with Newport lying just outside the relegation places they entered a run of form that saw them lose just two more games in the first half of the season. Highlights included home wins over Northampton Town, AFC Wimbledon, York City, Southend United, Stevenage and Plymouth Argyle; and away wins at Portsmouth, Dagenham & Redbridge, Bury, Carlisle United and Cheltenham Town. At the halfway point in the season County were in the play-off positions in 5th place, just three points from an automatic promotion spot.

In the new year, the good results kept coming: Home wins over Carlisle and Portsmouth put County in third place. However, there was speculation that County's success had led to interest in manager Justin Edinburgh from other clubs. There had been approaches in the previous season: On 2 December 2013, County rejected an approach from Edinburgh's former club Portsmouth to be interviewed as a successor to Guy Whittingham as Portsmouth manager. In January 2014 Edinburgh stated he had rebuffed an unofficial approach directly to himself to be considered as manager of Northampton Town Following the win over Portsmouth, County had now lost three games in a row, as the speculation about Edinburgh's future grew. On 3 February Gillingham made an official approach, and on 7 February he was announced as the new Gills' boss. His departure was confirmed just two hours before kick-off at AFC Wimbledon and, under caretaker manager Jimmy Dack, County slipped to a fourth successive defeat. County halted a run of four straight defeats with a 1–1 draw against Tranmere Rovers in Dack's first home game in charge. Despite the poor run of form Newport were still within the play-off positions, in 6th place. However, with only five more wins in the remaining 16 games, County slipped out of the play-off places, eventually finishing 9th.

=== Results summary ===
Overall								Home						Away					
Pld	W	D	L	GF	GA	GD	Pts	W	D	L	GF	GA	GD	W	D	L	GF	GA	GD
46	18	11	17	50	52	−2	65	9	7	7	29	23	+6	9	4	10	21	29	−8

Last updated: 2 May 2015.

=== Results by round ===
Round	1	2	3	4	5	6	7	8	9	10	11	12	13	14	15	16	17	18	19	20	21	22	23	24	25	26	27	28	29	30	31	32	33	34	35	36	37	38	39	40	41	42	43	44	45	46
Ground	H	A	A	H	A	H	H	A	A	H	A	H	A	H	H	A	H	A	A	H	A	H	A	H	H	A	A	H	A	H	A	H	A	H	A	H	H	A	A	H	A	H	A	H	A	H
Result	L	L	L	D	W	D	W	D	D	W	L	W	W	W	D	D	D	W	W	W	L	W	W	W	W	L	L	L	L	D	W	L	W	L	L	D	W	D	W	D	L	L	L	L	W	L
Position	23	21	22	22	19	19	17	17	16	15	18	13	9	8	7	8	9	8	7	6	7	7	5	4	3	5	6	6	6	6	6	8	7	7	9	9	8	7	6	6	7	8	9	9	9	9

Updated to match(es) played on 2 May 2015. Source: bbc.co.uk
A = Away; H = Home; W = Win; D = Draw; L = Loss

== League table ==
Pos	Team	Pld	W	D	L	GF	GA	GD	Pts	Promotion, qualification or relegation
1	Burton Albion (C, P)	46	28	10	8	69	39	+30	94	Promotion to Football League One
2	Shrewsbury Town (P)	46	27	8	11	67	31	+36	89	Promotion to Football League One
3	Bury (P)	46	26	7	13	60	40	+20	85	Promotion to Football League One
4	Wycombe Wanderers	46	23	15	8	67	45	+22	84	Qualification for League Two play-offs (Note: Four teams play for one spot and promotion to Football League One.)
5	Southend United (O, P)	46	24	12	10	54	38	+16	84	Qualification for League Two play-offs
6	Stevenage	46	20	12	14	62	54	+8	72	Qualification for League Two play-offs
7	Plymouth Argyle	46	20	11	15	55	37	+18	71	Qualification for League Two play-offs
8	Luton Town	46	19	11	16	54	44	+10	68	
9	Newport County	46	18	11	17	51	54	−3	65	
10	Exeter City	46	17	13	16	61	65	−4	64	
11	Morecambe	46	17	12	17	53	52	+1	63	
12	Northampton Town	46	18	7	21	67	62	+5	61	
13	Oxford United	46	15	16	15	50	49	+1	61	
14	Dagenham & Redbridge	46	17	8	21	58	59	−1	59	
15	AFC Wimbledon	46	14	16	16	54	60	−6	58	
16	Portsmouth	46	14	15	17	52	54	−2	57	
17	Accrington Stanley	46	15	11	20	58	77	−19	56	
18	York City	46	11	19	16	46	51	−5	52	
19	Cambridge United	46	13	12	21	61	66	−5	51	
20	Carlisle United	46	14	8	24	56	74	−18	50	
21	Mansfield Town	46	13	9	24	38	62	−24	48	
22	Hartlepool United	46	12	9	25	39	70	−31	45	
23	Cheltenham Town (R)	46	9	14	23	40	67	−27	41	Relegation to the National League
24	Tranmere Rovers (R)	46	9	12	25	45	67	−22	39	Relegation to the National League

Updated to match(es) played on 23 May 2015. Source: BBC Sport
Rules for classification: 1) Points; 2) Goal difference; 3) Number of goals scored
(C) Champions; (O) Play-off winners; (P) Promoted; (R) Relegated

== Squad statistics ==
=== Squad information ===
Caps and goals as at 10 May 2015 as per Soccerbase.

No.	Name	Position	Nationality	Place of birth	Date of birth (age)	Club caps all competitions	Club goals all competitions	Previous club	Date signed	Fee	Contract end
Goalkeepers
1	Lenny Pidgeley	GK	(England)	Twickenham	7 February 1984 (age 42)	74	0	Exeter City	1 August 2012	Free	2015
22	Simon Thomas	GK	(Canada)	Victoria, British Columbia	12 April 1990 (age 36)	0	0	Vancouver Whitecaps	8 August 2014	Free	2014
25	Jamie Stephens	GK	(England)	Wotton-under-Edge	24 August 1993 (age 33)	13	0	Liverpool	10 July 2013	Free	2015
30	Joe Day	GK	(England)	Brighton	13 August 1990 (age 36)	38	0	Peterborough United	29 December 2014	Undisclosed	2017
Defenders
2	Ryan Jackson	RB	(England)	Streatham	31 July 1990 (age 36)	73	0	Macclesfield Town	24 July 2013	Compensation	2015
3	Kevin Feely	CB	(Republic of Ireland)	Kildare	30 August 1992 (age 34)	34	1	Charlton Athletic	30 May 2014	Free	2016
5	Darren Jones	CB	(Wales)	Newport	26 August 1983 (age 43)	45	4	AFC Wimbledon	20 May 2014	Free	2016
6	Ismail Yakubu	CB	(England)	(Nigeria) Kano	8 April 1985 (age 41)	131	16	AFC Wimbledon	1 July 2011	Free	2015
13	Andy Sandell	LB	(England)	Calne	8 September 1983 (age 43)	121	14	Chippenham Town	1 January 2012	Free	2015
15	Scott Tancock	CB	(Wales)	Swansea	29 December 1993 (age 32)	4	0	Swansea City	26 September 2014	Loan	2014
16	Andrew Hughes	LB	(Wales)	Cardiff	5 June 1992 (age 34)	123	4	Youth system	1 July 2009	Trainee	2015
21	Curtis Obeng	RB	(England)	Stretford	14 February 1989 (age 37)	6	0	Swansea City	24 October 2014	Loan	2014
26	Regan Poole	CB	(Wales)	Cardiff	18 June 1998 (age 28)	12	0	Youth system	15 September 2014	Trainee	2015
27	David Tutonda	CB	(Democratic Republic of the Congo)		11 October 1995 (age 31)	12	2	Cardiff City	13 February 2015	Loan	2015
31	Kieran Parselle	DF	(England)	(England) Portishead		0	0	Youth system	21 March 2015	Trainee	2015
	Byron Anthony	CB	(Wales)	Newport	20 September 1984 (age 42)	32	3	Hereford United	16 Nov 2012	Free	2014
Midfielders
4	Max Porter	CM	(England)	Hornchurch	29 June 1987 (age 39)	88	4	AFC Wimbledon	1 July 2012	Free	2015
7	Adam Chapman	CM	(Northern Ireland)	(England) Doncaster	29 November 1989 (age 36)	89	6	Oxford United	1 July 2013	Undisclosed	2015
8	Lee Minshull	CM	(England)	Chatham	11 November 1985 (age 41)	135	14	AFC Wimbledon	1 July 2012	Free	2015
12	Robbie Willmott	MF	(England)	Harlow	16 May 1990 (age 36)	92	13	Cambridge United	10 January 2013	Free	2015
17	Michael Flynn	CM	(Wales)	Newport	12 October 1980 (age 46)	94	5	Bradford City	26 July 2012	Free	2015
18	Yan Klukowski	CM	(England)	Chippenham	1 January 1987 (age 39)	41	6	Forest Green Rovers	20 May 2014	Free	2016
19	Kyle Patten	MF	(Wales)		21 July 1994 (age 32)	1	0	Youth system	23 August 2014	Trainee	2015
22	Tom Owen-Evans	MF	(Wales)		18 March 1997 (age 29)	1	0	Youth system	15 September 2014	Trainee	2015
33	Mark Byrne	CM	(Republic of Ireland)	Dublin	9 November 1988 (age 38)	44	4	Barnet	14 July 2014	Free	2015
Forwards
9	Rene Howe	CF	(England)	Bedford	22 October 1986 (age 40)	30	3	Burton Albion	9 January 2014	Free	2015
10	Aaron O'Connor	FW	(England)	Nottingham	9 August 1983 (age 43)	87	31	Luton Town	24 July 2012	Free	2015
11	Chris Zebroski	FW	(England)	Swindon	26 October 1986 (age 40)	77	20	Eastleigh	1 July 2013	Free	2015
14	Shaun Jeffers	FW	(England)	Bedford	14 April 1992 (age 34)	35	3	Peterborough United	28 January 2014	Free	2015
20	James Loveridge	FW	(Wales)	Llanelli	16 May 1994 (age 32)	8	0	Swansea City	3 October 2014	Loan	2014
20	Miles Storey	FW	(England)	West Bromwich	4 January 1994 (age 32)	18	2	Swindon Town	30 January 2015	Loan	2015
23	Christian Jolley	FW	(England)	Fleet	12 May 1988 (age 38)	72	17	AFC Wimbledon	11 January 2013	Undisclosed	2015
24	Joe Parker	FW	(England)		11 March 1995 (age 31)	4	0	Gloucester City	19 November 2013	Free	2015
28	Danny Crow	CF	(England)	Great Yarmouth	26 January 1986 (age 40)	65	8	Luton Town	1 July 2012	Free	2015
39	Aaron Collins	FW	(Wales)	Newport	27 May 1997 (age 29)	3	0	Youth system	15 September 2014	Trainee	2015
45	Joe Pigott	FW	(England)	Maidstone	24 November 1993 (age 32)	11	3	Charlton Athletic	11 September 2014	Loan	2014

=== Transfers ===
==== In ====
Date	Pos.	Name	From	Fee	Ref.
20 May 2014	DF	(Wales) Darren Jones	(England) AFC Wimbledon	Free	
20 May 2014	MF	(England) Yan Klukowski	(England) Forest Green Rovers	Free	
30 May 2014	DF	(Republic of Ireland) Kevin Feely	(England) Charlton Athletic	Free	
14 July 2014	MF	(Republic of Ireland) Mark Byrne	(England) Barnet	Free	
8 August 2014	GK	(Canada) Simon Thomas	(Canada) Vancouver Whitecaps	Free	
29 December 2014	GK	(England) Joe Day	(England) Peterborough United	Undisclosed record	

==== Out ====
Date	Pos.	Name	To	Fee	Ref.
1 September 2014	GK	(Canada) Simon Thomas	Released		
15 January 2015	FW	(England) Danny Crow	Released		
21 January 2015	FW	(England) Christian Jolley	Released		
25 March 2015	FW	(England) Rene Howe	Released		
17 April 2015	FW	(England) Chris Zebroski	Released		
12 May 2015	MF	(Wales) Mike Flynn	Released		
12 May 2015	FW	(England) Shaun Jeffers	Released		
12 May 2015	FW	(England) Aaron O'Connor	Released		
12 May 2015	MF	(England) Lee Minshull	Released		
12 May 2015	MF	(Wales) Kyle Patten	Released		
12 May 2015	GK	(England) Lenny Pidgeley	Released		
12 May 2015	GK	(England) Jamie Stephens	Released		
12 May 2015	MF	(England) Max Porter	Released		
12 May 2015	FW	(England) Joe Parker	Released		
12 May 2015	DF	(England) Andy Sandell	Released		
12 May 2015	FW	(England) Robbie Willmott	Released		
12 May 2015	DF	(England) Ismail Yakubu	Released		
15 May 2015	MF	(Northern Ireland) Adam Chapman	Mansfield Town	free	
15 May 2015	DF	(Wales) Darren Jones	Forest Green	free	
26 May 2015	DF	(England) Ryan Jackson	Gillingham	free	

==== Loans in ====
Date	Pos.	Name	From	Expiry
28 August 2014	GK	(England) Joe Day	(England) Peterborough United	28 November 2014
11 September 2014	FW	(England) Joe Pigott	(England) Charlton Athletic	22 November 2014
26 September 2014	DF	(Wales) Scott Tancock	(Wales) Swansea City	21 November 2014
2 October 2014	FW	(Wales) James Loveridge	(Wales) Swansea City	31 November 2014
23 October 2014	DF	(England) Curtis Obeng	(Wales) Swansea City	18 December 2014
30 January 2015	FW	(England) Miles Storey	(England) Swindon Town	End of season
13 February 2015	DF	(Democratic Republic of the Congo) David Tutonda	(Wales) Cardiff City	End of season

==== Loans out ====
Date	Pos.	Name	To	Expiry
12 September 2014	MF	(Wales) Kyle Patten	(England) Bath City	12 October 2014
18 September 2014	FW	(England) Joe Parker	(England) Gloucester City	18 November 2014
19 September 2014	FW	(England) Shaun Jeffers	(England) Brackley Town	19 November 2014
25 September 2014	FW	(England) Christian Jolley	(England) Forest Green Rovers	25 November 2014
17 October 2014	GK	(England) Jamie Stephens	(England) Gloucester City	17 November 2014
10 December 2014	FW	(England) Joe Parker	(England) Gloucester City	10 January 2015
8 January 2015	MF	(Wales) Kyle Patten	(Wales) Merthyr Town	12 April 2015
8 January 2015	FW	(Wales) Aaron Collins	(Wales) Merthyr Town	8 March 2015
2 February 2015	GK	(England) Lenny Pidgeley	(England) Mansfield Town	End of Season

== Managerial statistics ==
Only competitive games from the 2014–15 season are included.

Name	Nat.	From	To	Record								Honours
Name	Nat.	From	To	PLD	W	D	L	GF	GA	GD	W%	Honours
Justin Edinburgh	(England)	—	7 February 2015	31	13	7	11	40	40	+0	41.9	
Jimmy Dack	(England)	7 February 2015	—	18	5	4	9	15	21	−6	27.8	

== Match details ==
=== Pre-season friendlies ===
Date	Opponents	Venue	Result	Scorers	Attendance	Reports
Tuesday 8 July 2014	Evesham United	Spiers and Hartwell Jubilee Stadium	4–2	Byrne 32', Howe 40', Klukowski 61', Zebroski 81'		Report
Saturday 12 July 2014	Cirencester Town	Corinium Stadium	5–0	O'Connor 37', Howe 50', 58', Parker 69', Flynn 82'		Report
Tuesday 15 July 2014	Weston-super-Mare	Woodspring Stadium	2–0	O'Connor 46', Jolley 81'		Report
Saturday 19 July 2014	Gloucester City	Causeway Ground	2–0	Howe 73', 86'		Report
Tuesday 22 July 2014	Basingstoke Town	The Camrose	1–1	O'Connor 30'		Report
Saturday 26 July 2014	(Germany) Carl Zeiss Jena	Newport Stadium	1–0	Jones 63'	2,630	Report
Tuesday 29 July 2014	Coventry City	Newport Stadium	1–0	Yakubu 20'	828	Report
Saturday 2 August 2014	West Ham United U-21	Little Heath Sports Ground	3–0	Klukowski 28', Zebroski 64', Howe 67'		Report

=== League Two ===
9 August 2014 1	Newport County	0–2	Wycombe Wanderers	Newport
15:00 BST (UTC+1)		Report; Report; Report; Report; Report; Report; Report	Murphy 40'; Cowan-Hall 44'	Stadium: Rodney Parade; Attendance: 3,634; Referee: Peter Bankes

16 August 2014 2	Morecambe	3–2	Newport County	Morecambe
15:00 BST (UTC+1)	Ellison 58', 63'; Mullin 84'	Report; Report; Report; Report; Report; Report	Chapman 27'; O'Connor 29'	Stadium: Globe Arena; Attendance: 1,506; Referee: Seb Stockbridge

19 August 2014 3	Mansfield Town	1–0	Newport County	Mansfield
19:45 BST (UTC+1)	Clements 2'	Report; Report; Report; Report; Report; Report		Stadium: Field Mill; Attendance: 2,448; Referee: Darren Bond

23 August 2014 4	Newport County	1–1	Burton Albion	Newport
15:00 BST (UTC+1)	Zebroski 37'	Report; Report; Report; Report; Report; Report; Report	Mousinho 51'	Stadium: Rodney Parade; Attendance: 2,872; Referee: Kevin Johnson

30 August 2014 5	Portsmouth	0–1	Newport County	Portsmouth
15:00 BST (UTC+1)		Report; Report; Report; Report; Report; Report	Sandell 84'	Stadium: Fratton Park; Attendance: 16,191; Referee: Lee Collins

8 September 2014 6	Newport County	1–1	Cambridge United	Newport
19:45 BST (UTC+1)	Willmott 90'	Report; Report; Report; Report; Report; Report; Report	Chadwick 48'	Stadium: Rodney Parade; Attendance: 2,594; Referee: Steve Martin

13 September 2014 7	Newport County	3–2	Northampton Town	Newport
15:00 BST (UTC+1)	Zebroski 18'; Jones 33'; Minshull 53'	Report; Report; Report; Report; Report; Report	D'Ath 76'; Richards 85'	Stadium: Rodney Parade; Attendance: 2,875; Referee: Chris Sarginson

16 September 2014 8	Tranmere Rovers	0–0	Newport County	Tranmere
19:45 BST (UTC+1)		Report; Report; Report; Report; Report; Report		Stadium: Prenton Park; Attendance: 3,948; Referee: Paul Tierney

20 September 2014 9	Shrewsbury Town	0–0	Newport County	Shrewsbury
15:00 BST (UTC+1)		Report; Report; Report; Report; Report; Report		Stadium: New Meadow; Attendance: 4,904; Referee: Darren Handley

27 September 2014 10	Newport County	4–1	AFC Wimbledon	Newport
15:00 BST (UTC+1)	Yakubu 18'; Pigott 46', 65'; O'Connor 91'	Report; Report; Report; Report; Report; Report	Akinfenwa 78'	Stadium: Rodney Parade; Attendance: 2,804; Referee: Darren Deadman

4 October 2014 11	Oxford United	1–0	Newport County	Oxford
15:00 BST (UTC+1)	Collins 40'	Report; Report; Report; Report; Report; Report		Stadium: Kassam Stadium; Attendance: 5,072; Referee: Darren Sheldrake

11 October 2014 12	Newport County	3–1	York City	Newport
15:00 BST (UTC+1)	Hughes 51'; Zebroski 65'; Jones 72'	Report; Report; Report; Report; Report; Report	De Girolamo 7'	Stadium: Rodney Parade; Attendance: 2,822; Referee: Carl Berry

18 October 2014 13	Dagenham & Redbridge	0–1	Newport County	Dagenham
15:00 BST (UTC+1)		Report; Report; Report; Report; Report; Report	Zebroski 90'	Stadium: Victoria Road; Attendance: 1,654; Referee: Tim Robinson

21 October 2014 14	Newport County	1–0	Southend United	Newport
19:45 BST (UTC+1)	Byrne 74'	Report; Report; Report; Report; Report; Report		Stadium: Rodney Parade; Attendance: 2,558; Referee: Keith Hill

25 October 2014 15	Newport County	1–1	Accrington Stanley	Newport
15:00 BST (UTC+1)	Pigott 72'	Report; Report; Report; Report; Report; Report; Report	Maguire 62'	Stadium: Rodney Parade; Attendance: 3,254; Referee: Mark Haywood

1 November 2014 16	Hartlepool United	2–2	Newport County	Hartlepool
15:00 UTC	Walker 80'; Duckworth 87'	Report; Report; Report; Report; Report; Report	Zebroski 38'; O'Connor 57'	Stadium: Victoria Park; Attendance: 3,172; Referee: Mark Brown

16 November 2014 17	Newport County	2–2	Exeter City	Newport
15:00 UTC	Klukowski 49'; Porter 51'	Report; Report; Report; Report; Report; Report	Nichols 22' (pen.); Cummins 40'	Stadium: Rodney Parade; Attendance: 4,070; Referee: Scott Mathieson

22 November 2014 18	Bury	1–3	Newport County	Bury
15:00 UTC	Rose 61'	Report; Report; Report; Report; Report; Report	O'Connor 3', 43', 93'	Stadium: Gigg Lane; Attendance: 3,166; Referee: Carl Boyeson

29 November 2014 19	Carlisle United	2–3	Newport County	Carlisle
15:00 UTC	Potts 52'; Amoo 90+8'	Report; Report; Report; Report; Report; Report	Klukowski 9'; Yakubu 47'; Jeffers 90+2'	Stadium: Brunton Park; Attendance: 3,642; Referee: Peter Bankes

13 December 2014 20	Newport County	2–0	Stevenage	Newport
15:00 UTC	O'Connor 26'; Jones 45'	Report; Report; Report; Report; Report; Report		Stadium: Rodney Parade; Attendance: 2,976; Referee: Brendan Malone

20 December 2014 21	Luton Town	3–0	Newport County	Luton
15:00 UTC	Wilkinson 4'; Rooney 51'; Howells 90+3'	Report; Report; Report; Report; Report; Report		Stadium: Kenilworth Road; Attendance: 8,383; Referee: Darren Drysdale replaced by Dave Bushell

26 December 2014 22	Newport County	2–0	Plymouth Argyle	Newport
15:00 UTC	Zebroski 8'; Byrne 82'	Report; Report; Report; Report; Report; Report		Stadium: Rodney Parade; Attendance: 5,020; Referee: Stephen Martin

28 December 2014 23	Cheltenham Town	0–1	Newport County	Cheltenham
15:00 UTC		Report; Report; Report; Report; Report; Report	Zebroski 11'	Stadium: Whaddon Road; Attendance: 3,417; Referee: Iain Williamson

3 January 2015 24	Newport County	2–1	Carlisle United	Newport
15:00 UTC	Chapman 45' (pen.); Minshull 70'	Report; Report; Report; Report; Report; Report	Meppen-Walter 11'	Stadium: Rodney Parade; Attendance: 3,273; Referee: Darren Sheldrake

10 January 2015 25	Newport County	1–0	Portsmouth	Newport
15:00 UTC	Byrne 68'	Report; Report; Report; Report; Report; Report		Stadium: Rodney Parade; Attendance: 4,575; Referee: Michael Bull

17 January 2015 26	Cambridge United	4–0	Newport County	Cambridge
15:00 UTC	McGeehan 12', 64'; Kaikai 43'; Hughes 79'	Report; Report; Report; Report; Report; Report; Report		Stadium: Abbey Stadium; Attendance: 6,076; Referee: Stuart Attwell

24 January 2015 27	Northampton Town	3–0	Newport County	Northampton
15:00 UTC	Cresswell 13'; O'Toole 29'; D'Ath 82'	Report; Report; Report; Report; Report; Report		Stadium: Sixfields Stadium; Attendance: 4,226; Referee: Darren Deadman

31 January 2015 28	Newport County	0–1	Shrewsbury Town	Newport
15:00 UTC		Report; Report; Report; Report; Report; Report	Akpa Akpro 77'	Stadium: Rodney Parade; Attendance: 3,706; Referee: James Linington

7 February 2015 29	AFC Wimbledon	2–0	Newport County	Kingston upon Thames
15:00 UTC	Akinfenwa 11', 72'	Report; Report; Report; Report; Report; Report		Stadium: Kingsmeadow; Attendance: 3,817; Referee: Dean Whitestone

10 February 2015 30	Newport County	1–1	Tranmere Rovers	Newport
19:45 UTC	Byrne 83'	Report; Report; Report; Report; Report; Report	Donnelly 45'	Stadium: Rodney Parade; Attendance: 2,327; Referee: Robert Lewis

14 February 2015 31	Wycombe Wanderers	1–2	Newport County	High Wycombe
15:00 UTC	Onyedinma 55'	Report; Report; Report; Report; Report; Report; Report	Klukowski 20', 79'	Stadium: Adams Park; Attendance: 3,196; Referee: Michael Bull

21 February 2015 32	Newport County	0–1	Morecambe	Newport
15:00 UTC		Report; Report; Report; Report; Report; Report; Report	Redshaw 8'	Stadium: Rodney Parade; Attendance: 2,883; Referee: Andy D'Urso

28 February 2015 33	Burton Albion	0–1	Newport County	Burton upon Trent
15:00 UTC		Report; Report; Report; Report; Report; Report; Report	Storey 59'	Stadium: Pirelli Stadium; Attendance: 2,974; Referee: Andrew Madley

3 March 2015 34	Newport County	0–1	Mansfield Town	Newport
19:45 UTC		Report; Report; Report; Report; Report; Report; Report	Lambe 87'	Stadium: Rodney Parade; Attendance: 2,481; Referee: Andy Davies

7 March 2015 35	Stevenage	2–1	Newport County	Stevenage
15:00 UTC	Lee 31'; Dembélé 67'	Report; Report; Report; Report; Report; Report; Report	Chapman 88'	Stadium: Broadhall Way; Attendance: 2,941; Referee: Graham Salisbury

13 March 2015 36	Newport County	1–1	Cheltenham Town	Newport
19:45 UTC	Storey 38'	Report; Report; Report; Report; Report; Report	Burns 13'	Stadium: Rodney Parade; Attendance: 2,951; Referee: Wayne Barratt

17 March 2015 37	Newport County	1–0	Luton Town	Newport
19:45 UTC	O'Connor 21'	Report; Report; Report; Report; Report; Report		Stadium: Rodney Parade; Attendance: 2,536; Referee: Brendan Malone

21 March 2015 38	Plymouth Argyle	0–0	Newport County	Plymouth
15:00 UTC		Report; Report; Report; Report; Report; Report; Report		Stadium: Home Park; Attendance: 6,847; Referee: Charles Breakspear

27 March 2015 39	Accrington Stanley	0–2	Newport County	Accrington
19:45 UTC		Report; Report; Report; Report; Report; Report	O'Connor 66'; Jeffers 90+5'	Stadium: Crown Ground; Attendance: 1,111; Referee: Kevin Wright

3 April 2015 40	Newport County	2–2	Hartlepool United	Newport
15:00 BST (UTC+1)	Jones 44'; O'Connor 48'	Report; Report; Report; Report; Report; Report	Minshull 15' (o.g.); Hugill 37'	Stadium: Rodney Parade; Attendance: 3,531; Referee: Kevin Johnson

6 April 2015 41	Exeter City	2–0	Newport County	Exeter
13:00 BST (UTC+1)	Wheeler 77'; Harley 90+1' (pen.)	Report; Report; Report; Report; Report; Report		Stadium: St James Park; Attendance: 4,478; Referee: Gavin Ward

11 April 2015 42	Newport County	0–2	Bury	Newport
15:00 BST (UTC+1)		Report; Report; Report; Report; Report	Lowe 21'; Nardiello 88'	Stadium: Rodney Parade; Attendance: 3,123; Referee: Oliver Langford

14 April 2015 43	Southend United	2–0	Newport County	Southend-on-Sea
19:45 BST (UTC+1)	Bolger 45'; McLaughlin 51'	Report; Report; Report; Report; Report		Stadium: Roots Hall; Attendance: 5,480; Referee: Robert Lewis

18 April 2015 44	Newport County	2–3	Dagenham & Redbridge	Newport
15:00 BST (UTC+1)	Tutonda 90'; O'Connor 90'	Report; Report; Report; Report; Report; Report; Report	Hemmings 78'; Doidge 81'; Jakubiak 88'	Stadium: Rodney Parade; Attendance: 2,737; Referee: Andy Woolmer

25 April 2015 45	York City	0–2	Newport County	York
15:00 BST (UTC+1)		Report; Report; Report; Report; Report; Report	Tutonda 49'; Minshull 75'	Stadium: Bootham Crescent; Attendance: 3,459; Referee: Darren Deadman

2 May 2015 46	Newport County	0–1	Oxford United	Newport
15:00 BST (UTC+1)		Report; Report; Report; Report; Report; Report	Roofe 30'	Stadium: Rodney Parade; Attendance: 4,295; Referee: Mark Heywood

=== Football League Cup ===
12 August 2014 Round 1	Reading	3–1	Newport County	Reading
20:00 BST (UTC+1)	Pogrebnyak 20'; Blackman 87'; Tanner 90'	Report; Report; Report; Report; Report; Report	Jeffers 90'	Stadium: Madejski Stadium; Attendance: 6,459; Referee: James Linington

=== Football League Trophy ===
23 September 2014 Round 1	Newport County	1–2	Swindon Town	Newport
19:45 BST (UTC+1)	Klukowski 88'	Report; Report; Report; Report; Report	Obika 44'; Williams 62'	Stadium: Rodney Parade; Attendance: 1,822; Referee: Patrick Miller

=== FA Cup ===
8 November 2014 Round 1	Luton Town	4–2	Newport County	Luton
15:00 UTC	Guttridge 40'; Benson 58'; Miller 77'; Howells 86'	Report; Report; Report; Report; Report; Report	Klukowski 51'; O'Connor 64'	Stadium: Kenilworth Road; Attendance: 3,656; Referee: Chris Sarginson
