= Steven Drench =

English footballer

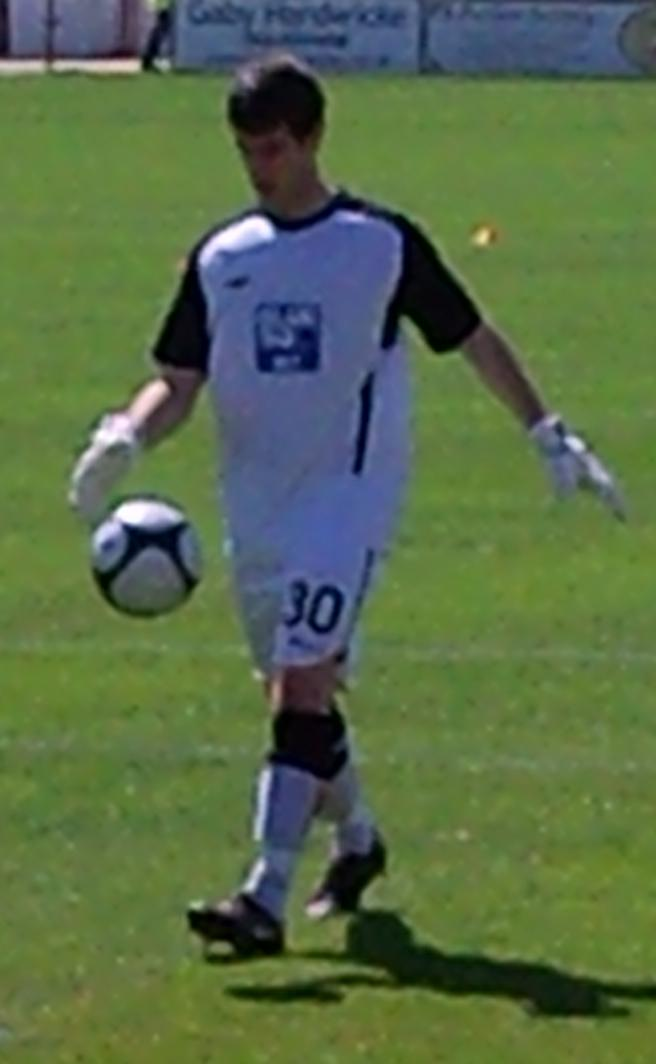

Personal information
- Full name: Steven Mark Drench
- Date of birth: 11 September 1985 (age 41)
- Place of birth: Manchester, England
- Height: 6 ft 1 in (1.85 m)
- Position: Goalkeeper

Youth career
- –2005: Blackburn Rovers

Senior career*
Years	Team	Apps	(Gls)
2005–2006	Blackburn Rovers	0	(0)
2005–2006	→ Morecambe (loan)	24	(0)
2006–2008	Morecambe	45	(0)
2008	→ Southport (loan)	19	(0)
2008–2009	Southport	0	(0)
2008–2009	→ Cambridge United (loan)	0	(0)
2009–2010	Leigh Genesis	45	(0)
2010–2016	Guiseley	231	(0)
2016–2017	FC Halifax Town	21	(0)
2017–2019	Bradford Park Avenue	37	(0)
2019–2020	Altrincham	3	(0)
2020–2021	Farsley Celtic	16	(0)
2021–2022	Altrincham	3	(0)
2022–2026	Chorley	4	(0)

International career
	England U17	?	(?)
- * Club domestic league appearances and goals as of 1 October 2021 (UTC)

Steven Mark Drench (born 11 September 1985) is an English footballer who plays as a goalkeeper.

== Club career ==
Drench began his career with the Blackburn Rovers youth system. Following an injury to Ryan Robinson, he joined Conference National team Morecambe on loan as goalkeeping cover in November 2005. The loan was extended for a second month in December and to the end of the 2005–06 season in February.

Following his release by Blackburn, Drench signed for Morecambe permanently in the summer of 2006. After beginning the 2006–07 season competing with Robinson for the starting goalkeeper's spot, Drench was confirmed as the club's first choice goalkeeper when Robinson left to join Forest Green Rovers. However, he dislocated his elbow in a challenge with York City's Clayton Donaldson in the play-off semi-final second leg, which forced him to miss the successful play-off Final against Exeter City. He finished the season with 47 appearances and won Morecambe's Player of the Year award. Following this injury, he struggled to regain his first team place following the signing of Joe Lewis on loan and Drench joined Conference North team Southport on a month's loan in January 2008. His stayed at Southport until the end of the season and he made 26 appearances for the club.

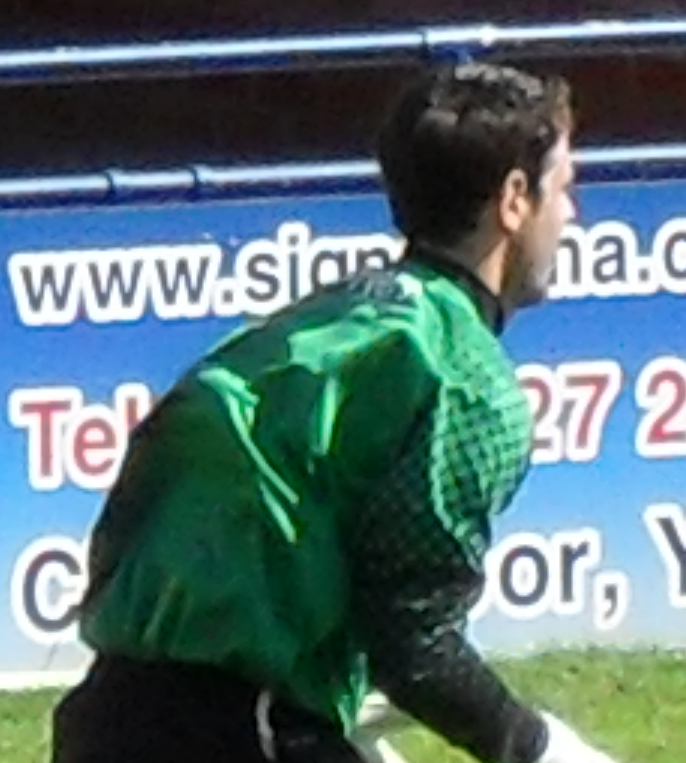
Drench while on trial with York City in 2010

After being released by Morecambe in June 2008, he signed for Southport permanently in July. However, he was allowed to leave the club on a free transfer and had a one-week trial with Conference team Stevenage Borough due to Drench's desire to remain full-time after the club reverted to part-time status following the departure of manager Gary Brabin to Cambridge United. Drench was reunited with Brabin after signing for Cambridge on a six-month loan on 21 August to provide cover for Danny Potter. He subsequently left the club following the expiration of the loan in January 2009.

Southport released Drench on 26 March 2009 and he signed for Leigh Genesis, finishing the 2008–09 season with five appearances for the team. He made 47 appearances in the 2009–10 season.

He had a trial with Conference team Barrow in July 2010 and he played in a pre-season friendly against Oldham Athletic. He later joined York City on trial and after featuring in pre-season friendlies against Hull City and Barnsley he was not offered a contract by the club.

He joined Conference North team Guiseley on trial in August, and played a large part in Guiseley's debut season in the Conference North. Drench was in goal as Guiseley earned promotion to the Conference National.

In 2017, Drench joined Bradford Park Avenue.

In 2019, Drench joined Altrincham and made his debut on 9 February against FC United.

In 2020, Drench joined Farsley Celtic.

Following the conclusion of his contract, in 2021, he temporarily retired from football before re-joining Altrincham as a player / coach.

== International career ==
Drench played for the England Schoolboys and England national under-17 team while with Blackburn.
