= Scott Tancock =

Welsh footballer (born 1993)

Personal information
- Full name: Scott Russell Tancock
- Date of birth: 29 December 1993 (age 32)
- Place of birth: Swansea, Wales
- Height: 6 ft 1 in (1.85 m)
- Position: Centre back

Team information
- Current team: Morriston Town

Youth career
- ?–2012: Swansea City

Senior career*
Years	Team	Apps	(Gls)
2012–2015	Swansea City	0	(0)
2014	→ Newport County (loan)	4	(0)
2014	→ Wrexham (loan)	2	(0)
2015–2018	Merthyr Town		
2018–2019	Llanelli Town	24	(0)
2019–2021	Haverfordwest County		
2021–2023	Carmarthen Town	48	(1)
2024–2025	Llanelli Town	18	(1)
2025–	Morriston Town	34	(2)

International career
2013–2014	Wales U21	6	(0)
- * Club domestic league appearances and goals as of 10:57, 16 November 2026 (UTC)

Scott Russell Tancock (born 29 December 1993) is a Welsh footballer who plays as a central defender for Morriston Town, having previously played for Swansea City.

== Club career ==
Born in Swansea, Wales, Tancock is a product of the Swansea City academy, where he began his career at and eventually become the club's U21 captain. In the summer of 2012, Tancock signed his first professional contract at the club.

In September 2014, he joined Football League Two side Newport County on a one-month loan deal. Tancock made his football league debut for Newport against Wimbledon on 27 September 2014. After the match, Wales based newspaper Wales Online praised Tancock's performance. On 23 October 2014, Tancock extended his loan for a further month. After two months at Newport County, Tancock's loan spell came to an end and returned to his parent club.

On his return from Newport County, Tancock immediately joined Vanarama National League team Wrexham on a one-month loan deal. Tancock made his Wrexham debut the next day, playing 90 minutes, in a 3–2 defeat to Altrincham. Tancock made one more appearance for Wrexham before returning to his parent club once again.

On 28 May 2015, Swansea City confirmed that Tancock had been released by the club. After a trial at Torquay United, Tancock joined Welsh side Merthyr Town.

In 2018, he signed for newly promoted Welsh Premier League side Llanelli Town. A year later, he joined Haverfordwest County.

In August 2021 he departed from Haverfordwest by mutual consent and joined Carmarthen Town.

In August 2024 he returned to Llanelli Town.

== International career ==
Because Tancock was born in Wales, he was among seven uncapped players to be called by Wales under-21. Tancock made his Wales U21 debut on 6 February 2013, in a 3–0 win over Iceland U21. Tancock went on to represent Wales under-21 on six occasions.

== Career statistics ==
As of 2 May 2015

Appearances and goals by club, season and competition
Club	Season	League			FA Cup		League Cup		Other		Total	
Club	Season	Division	Apps	Goals	Apps	Goals	Apps	Goals	Apps	Goals	Apps	Goals
Swansea City	2012–13	Premier League	0	0	0	0	0	0	—		0	0
Swansea City	2013–14	Premier League	0	0	0	0	0	0	0	0	0	0
Swansea City	2014–15	Premier League	0	0	0	0	0	0	—		0	0
Swansea City	Total		0	0	0	0	0	0	0	0	0	0
Newport County	2014–15	League Two	4	0	0	0	0	0	—		4	0
Wrexham	2014–15	Vanarama National League	2	0	0	0	0	0	—		2	0
Career total			6	0	0	0	0	0	0	0	6	0
