= Joe Parker (footballer) =

English Semi Pro footballer

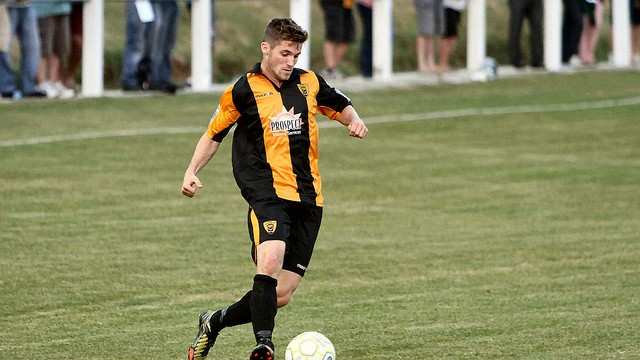
- Parker playing for Gloucester City in October 2013

Personal information
- Date of birth: 11 March 1995 (age 31)
- Place of birth: Gloucester, England
- Height: 1.80 m (5 ft 11 in)
- Position: Forward

Team information
- Current team: Yate Town

Senior career*
Years	Team	Apps	(Gls)
2012–2013	Gloucester City	20	(8)
2013	Shortwood United	7	(2)
2013–2015	Newport County	4	(0)
2014	→ Gloucester City (loan)	18	(3)
2014	→ Gloucester City (loan)	4	(2)
2015	→ Gloucester City (loan)	6	(3)
2015–2020	Gloucester City	147	(56)
2015	→ Cinderford Town (loan)		
2020–2022	Leamington	37	(2)
2022–	Chippenham Town	26	(8)
- * Club domestic league appearances and goals as of 16:09, 7 December 2017 (UTC)

Joe Parker (born 11 March 1995) is an English footballer who plays as a winger or striker for Yate Town.

== Career ==
A product of Hartpury College, Parker joined Conference North club Gloucester City. He attracted the attention of Newport County following a 19-minute hat-trick for Gloucester in an FA Cup third qualifying match against Yate Town. Parker joined Newport in November 2013 and was loaned back to Gloucester City for the remainder of the 2012–13 season. Parker had a further two loan spells with Gloucester City in September and December 2014.

Parker made his Football League debut for Newport County in the League Two fixture versus Cambridge United on 17 January 2015 as a second-half substitute for Andy Sandell. Newport lost the match 4–0. He was released by Newport in May 2015 at the end of his contract.

He signed for Chippenham Town in the summer of 2022, ending the campaign as the Bluebirds top goal scorer with 8 goals in 26 games from the wing. He then re-joined home City club Gloucester City in the summer of 2023.

On 4 July 2024 Tiverton Town announced that Parker had resigned permanently ahead of the new season. Parker enjoyed a loan spell the previous season from parent club Gloucester City. The former Newport County forward scored 11 times in 15 games at the end of a 2023–24 campaign that saw the Yellows retain their Pitching In Southern League Premier Division South status.

== Career statistics ==
As of match played 2 December 2017

Appearances and goals by club, season and competition
Club	Season	League			FA Cup		League Cup		Other		Total	
Club	Season	Division	Apps	Goals	Apps	Goals	Apps	Goals	Apps	Goals	Apps	Goals
Gloucester City	2012–13	Conference North	13	0	0	0	—		0	0	13	0
Gloucester City	2013–14	Conference North	7	0	2	0	—		1 (Note: Appearance in the FA Trophy)	0	28	3
Gloucester City	Gloucester total		20	0	2	0	0	0	1	0	23	0
Gloucester City (loan)	2013–14	Conference North	18	3	0	0	—		0	0	18	3
Shortwood United	2013–14	SFL - Div 1 South & West	7	2	0	0	—		0	0	7	2
Newport County	2014–15	League Two	4	0	0	0	—		0	0	4	0
Gloucester City (loan)	2014–15	Conference North	4	0	1	0	—		0	0	5	0
Gloucester City (loan)	2014–15	Conference North	6	3	0	0	—		0	0	6	3
Gloucester City	2015–16	National League North	21	5	0	0	—		0	0	21	5
Gloucester City	2016–17	National League North	40	7	0	0	—		0	0	40	7
Gloucester City	2017–18	National League South	19	7	0	0	—		0	0	19	7
Gloucester City	Gloucester total		80	19	0	0	0	0	0	0	80	19
Career total			135	27	3	0	0	0	1	0	139	27
