= Yan Klukowski =

English footballer (born 1987)

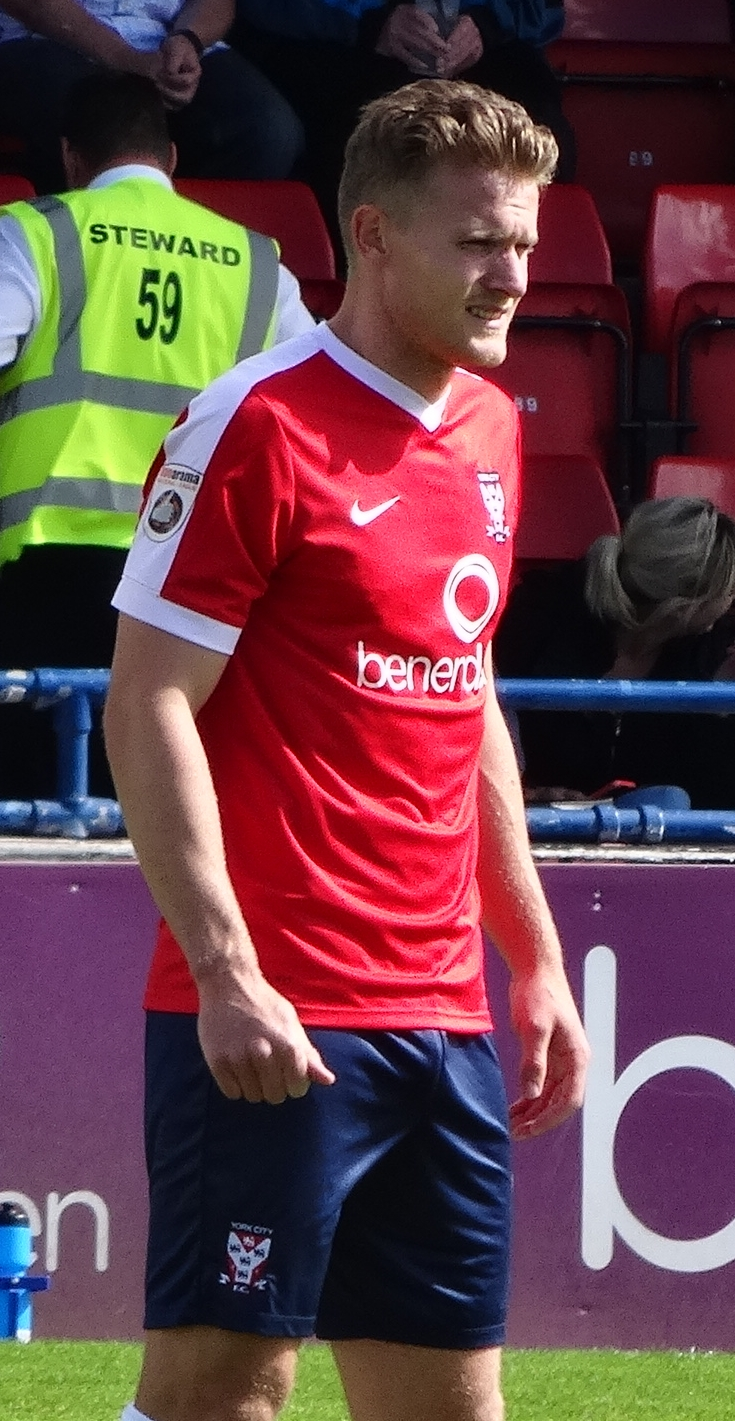
- Klukowski with York City in 2016

Personal information
- Full name: Yan Klukowski
- Date of birth: 1 January 1987 (age 39)
- Place of birth: Chippenham, England
- Height: 6 ft 1 in (1.85 m)
- Position: Midfielder

Team information
- Current team: Forest Green Rovers (head of academy)

Youth career
- Chippenham Town
- –2003: Bath City

College career
Years	Team	Apps	(Gls)
2005–2008	Central Connecticut	71	(24)

Senior career*
Years	Team	Apps	(Gls)
2003–2005	Bath City	14	(0)
2005	Chippenham Town	7	(0)
2006–2007	Chippenham Town	5	(0)
2007	Ottawa Fury	16	(1)
2008	Cape Cod Crusaders	14	(5)
2009	Western Mass Pioneers	12	(1)
2009	Chippenham Town	2	(0)
2010	Larkhall Athletic	8	(6)
2010–2014	Forest Green Rovers	159	(48)
2014–2016	Newport County	66	(5)
2016–2017	York City	25	(3)
2017–2018	Torquay United	7	(0)
2017	→ Kidderminster Harriers (loan)	4	(0)
2018–2019	Chippenham Town	4	(0)
2019–2020	Hungerford Town	10	(1)
2020–2023	Hereford	28	(0)

Managerial career
- 2020–2022: Hereford (player-coach)
- 2022–2023: Hereford (player-assistant)
- 2023: Hereford (interim manager)
- 2023: Gloucester City (assistant)
- 2024–2026: Forest Green Rovers (head of academy)
- 2026–: Forest Green Rovers (first team coach)
- * Club domestic league appearances and goals as of 13.24, 23 May 2023 (UTC)

Yan Klukowski (born 1 January 1987) is an English former professional footballer. He is currently Head of Academy at Forest Green Rovers.

== Club career ==
=== Youth and college ===
Born and raised in Chippenham, Wiltshire, Klukowski was educated at Sheldon School. His football education began at local club Chippenham Town before moving to Bath City. At 18 years of age, he broke into the first team at Bath. Klukowski turned down a new contract with Bath in July 2005 to sign a four-year scholarship with Central Connecticut State University (CCSU) in New Britain, Connecticut, United States. He had a brief stint with Chippenham Town at the start of the 2005–06 season before starting his scholarship.

At CCSU, Klukowski was the Northeast Conference Rookie of the Year, playing for the All Conference first team. He was named to the All-NEC first team and received second team NSCAA All-North Atlantic Region honors as a sophomore in 2006. From December 2006 to January 2007, Klukowski played with Chippenham Town, while on holiday from the United States. In 2007, he led the NEC in assists and was named to the All-NEC second team and the NSCAA All-North Atlantic Region first team.

During his college years, Klukowski also played with Ottawa Fury and the Cape Cod Crusaders in the USL Premier Development League.

=== Professional ===
Klukowski turned professional in 2009 and joined the Western Mass Pioneers of the USL Second Division, where he played 12 times, scoring once in a 2–1 win over Wilmington Hammerheads. He was the joint seventh highest assist provider in the 2009 USL Second Division, with five.

Following the conclusion of the season, Klukowski returned to England in an attempt to find a professional club to play for during 2009–10 and beyond. His first trial was provided by Carlisle United who were originally impressed and extended his trial period before deciding against offering him a contract. Klukowski then went on trial with Swindon Town, but was not offered a contract. In August 2009, Klukowski rejoined Chippenham Town. He later joined Larkhall Athletic until the end of 2009–10, scoring six goals from eight league appearances. In June 2010, he returned to Bath City on trial in an attempt to earn a contract following their promotion into the Conference Premier.

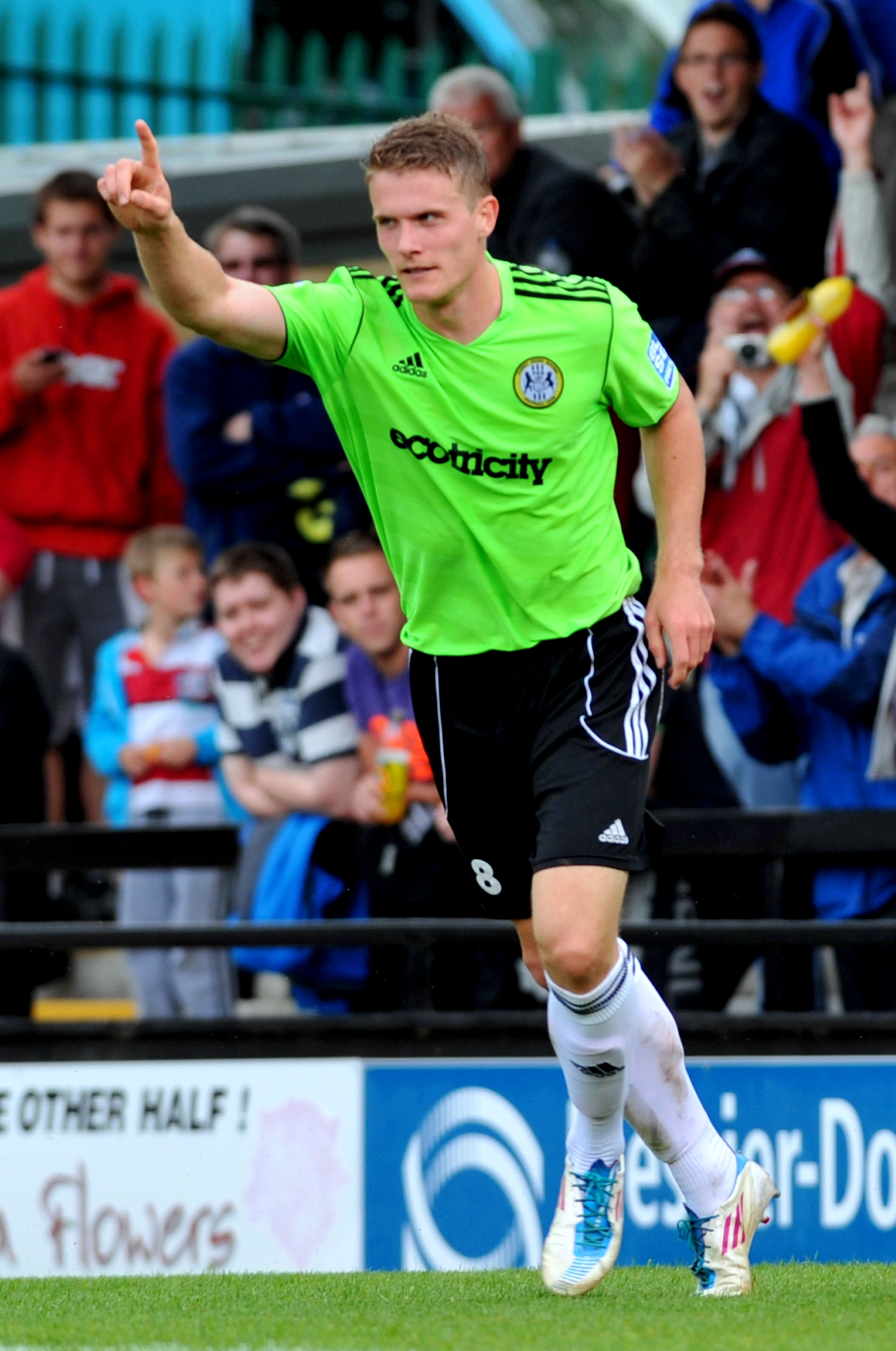
Klukowski celebrates scoring for Forest Green Rovers in 2012

In July 2010, he went on trial with Forest Green Rovers, before joining the Conference Premier club on 13 August. He scored his first goal for the club in August 2010 in only his second appearance against Wrexham. On 21 January 2011, he was awarded a new contract until the end of 2011–12 by Forest Green, after a number of impressive appearances. After suffering an injury in the latter months of 2010–11, Klukowski was required to have surgery and returned to first-team action at the start of 2011–12. He scored his first goal of the season in a 6–1 away win over Alfreton Town on 20 August 2011, after converting James Rowe's cross. On 31 March 2012, in a home match against Barrow, Klukowski scored his first hat-trick for Forest Green. Klukowski ended 2011–12 as Forest Green's top scorer with 18 goals from 45 appearances.

On 12 June 2012, Klukowski signed a contract extension at Forest Green, keeping him at the club until 2014. On 15 April 2014, two goals in a 2–1 away win over Macclesfield Town saw him overtake Alex Meechan as Forest Green's all-time leading Conference Premier goal scorer, a record that has since been beaten, with a total of 48 league goals for the club. On 28 April 2014, it was revealed that he had turned down the offer of a new contract with Forest Green in the hope he could earn a deal with a Football League club.

On 20 May 2014, Klukowski joined League Two club Newport County on a two-year contract. He made his debut for Newport on the opening day of 2014–15 against Wycombe Wanderers on 9 August 2014 as a second-half substitute. His first goal for Newport came in a 2–1 home defeat against Swindon Town on 23 September 2014 in the first round of the Football League Trophy, with a tap-in from Aaron O'Connor's pass. He was released by Newport on 10 May 2016 at the end of his contract.

On 28 June 2016, Klukowski joined newly relegated National League club York City on a two-year contract. On 21 May 2017, he started as York beat Macclesfield Town 3–2 at Wembley Stadium in the 2017 FA Trophy Final.

On 29 June 2017, Klukowski signed for National League club Torquay United on a contract of undisclosed length, having been allowed to leave York despite having a year left on his contract. He joined National League North club Kidderminster Harriers on 17 November 2017 on a one-month loan.

He was released by Torquay at the end of the 2017–18 season.

On 22 May 2018, Klukowski signed for National League South side Chippenham Town,

Klukowski left the Bluebirds on 17 September 2019. On 27 September, he then joined Hungerford Town.

== International career ==
Klukowski scored with a 35-yard shot on his debut for England schools, in a 3–0 away win over Scotland on 25 February 2005. He represented Great Britain at World University Games in Bangkok, Thailand in 2006. He was also selected to represent the Great Britain university football team at the 2007 Summer Universiade.

== Coaching career ==
On 15 July 2020, Klukowski signed for Hereford as a player-coach under manager Josh Gowling, with whom he played together with at Torquay United. On September 30, 2022, he was promoted to player-assistant coach following the departure of Steve Burr.

On 5 February 2023, following the departure of manager Josh Gowling, Klukowski was appointed interim manager. In May 2023, it was confirmed that Paul Caddis would take over the coaching position from May 1, 2023. At the same time, Klukowski left the club.

In May 2023, he joined Gloucester City in the role of assistant manager. He left by mutual agreement on 17 September 2023, along with manager Tim Flowers.

In May 2024, Klukowski was hired as Head of Academy at his former club, Forest Green Rovers.

== Personal life ==
Klukowski is of Polish descent, through his grandfather.

== Career statistics ==
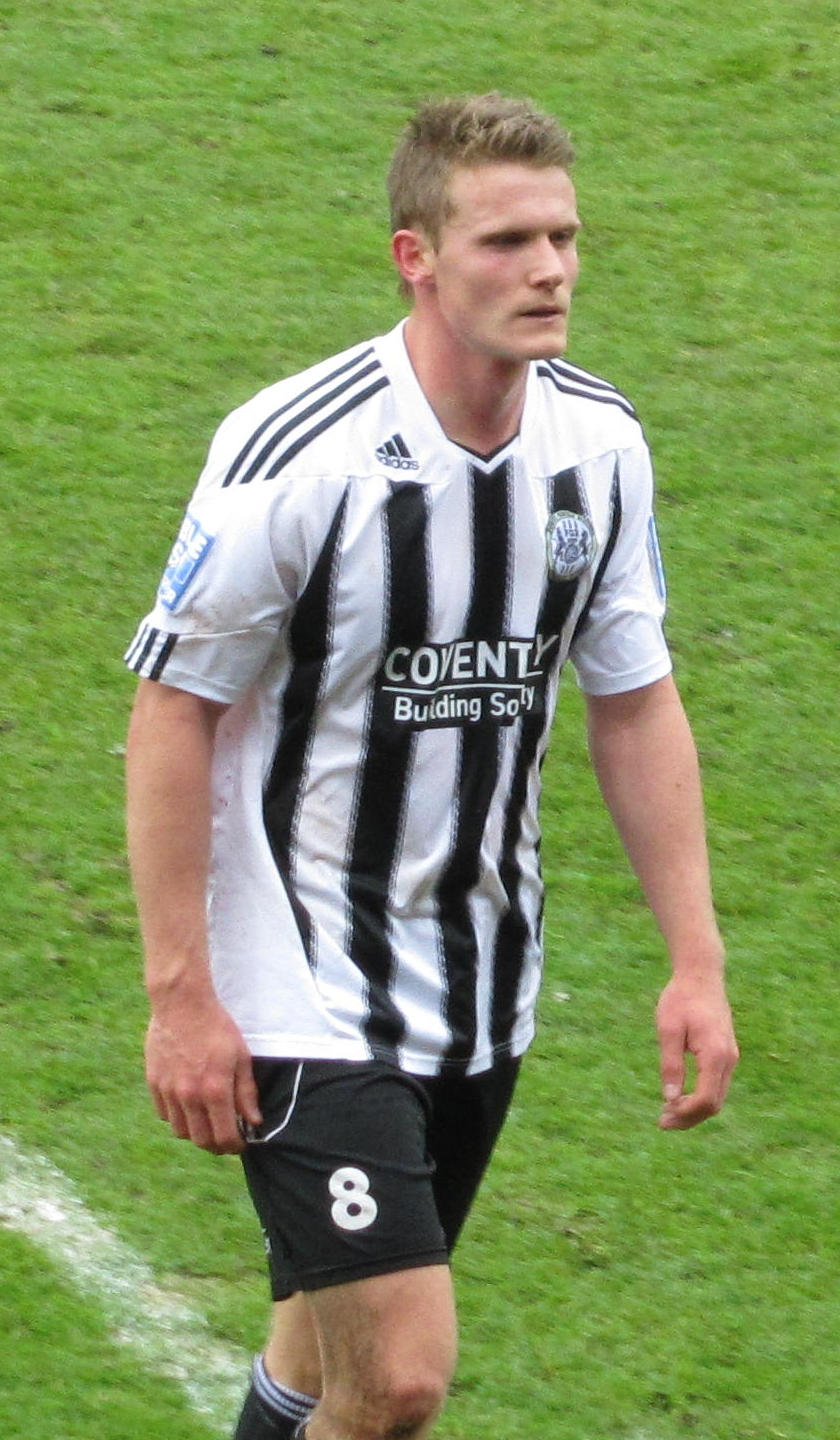
Klukowski playing for Forest Green Rovers in 2012

As of match played 29 April 2023

Appearances and goals by club, season and competition
Club	Season	League			National Cup (Note: Appearances in U.S. Open Cup and FA Cup)		League Cup		Other		Total	
Club	Season	Division	Apps	Goals	Apps	Goals	Apps	Goals	Apps	Goals	Apps	Goals
Bath City	2003–04	Southern League Premier Division	5	0			—				5	0
Bath City	2004–05	Southern League Premier Division	9	0			—				9	0
Bath City	Total		14	0			—				14	0
Chippenham Town	2005–06	Southern League Premier Division	7	0	—		—		—		7	0
Chippenham Town	2006–07	Southern League Premier Division	5	0	—		—		—		5	0
Chippenham Town	Total		12	0	—		—		—		12	0
Ottawa Fury	2007	USL Premier Development League	16	1	—		—		—		16	1
Cape Cod Crusaders	2008	USL Premier Development League	14	5	—		—		—		14	5
Western Mass Pioneers	2009	USL Second Division	12	1	2	0	—		—		14	1
Chippenham Town	2009–10	Southern League Premier Division	2	0	—		—		—		2	0
Larkhall Athletic	2009–10	Western League Premier Division	8	6	—		—		—		8	6
Forest Green Rovers	2010–11	Conference Premier	37	7	2	0	—		1 (Note: Appearance(s) in FA Trophy)	1	40	8
Forest Green Rovers	2011–12	Conference Premier	46	18	1	0	—		2	0	49	18
Forest Green Rovers	2012–13	Conference Premier	40	11	3	2	—		2	0	45	13
Forest Green Rovers	2013–14	Conference Premier	36	12	1	0	—		3	1	40	13
Forest Green Rovers	Total		159	48	7	2	—		8	2	174	52
Newport County	2014–15	League Two	38	4	1	1	1	0	1 (Note: Appearance in Football League Trophy)	1	41	6
Newport County	2015–16	League Two	28	1	2	1	1	0	1	0	32	2
Newport County	Total		66	5	3	2	2	0	2	1	73	8
York City	2016–17	National League	25	3	2	0	—		5	0	32	3
Torquay United	2017–18	National League	8	0	0	0	—		0	0	8	0
Kidderminster Harriers (loan)	2017–18	National League North	4	0	—		—		0	0	4	0
Chippenham Town	2018–19	National League South	8	0	1	0	—		0	0	9	0
Chippenham Town	2019–20	National League South	2	0	0	0	—		0	0	2	0
Chippenham Town	Total		10	0	1	0	—		0	0	11	0
Hungerford Town	2019–20	National League South	12	1	0	0	—		0	0	12	1
Hereford	2020–21	National League North	10	0	1	0	—		6	0	17	0
Hereford	2021–22	National League North	15	0	0	0	—		0	0	15	0
Hereford	2022–23	National League North	3	0	2	1	—		0	0	5	1
Hereford	Total		28	0	3	1	—		6	0	37	1
Career total			390	70	18	5	2	0	21	3	431	77

== Managerial statistics ==
As of 29 April 2023

Managerial record by team and tenure
Team	Nat	From	To	Record					Ref
Team	Nat	From	To	G	W	D	L	Win %	Ref
Hereford (interim manager)	(England)	5 February 2023	1 May 2023	17	5	5	7	29.41	
Total				17	5	5	7	29.41	—

== Honours ==
York City

- FA Trophy: 2016–17
