= Lenny Pidgeley =

English footballer

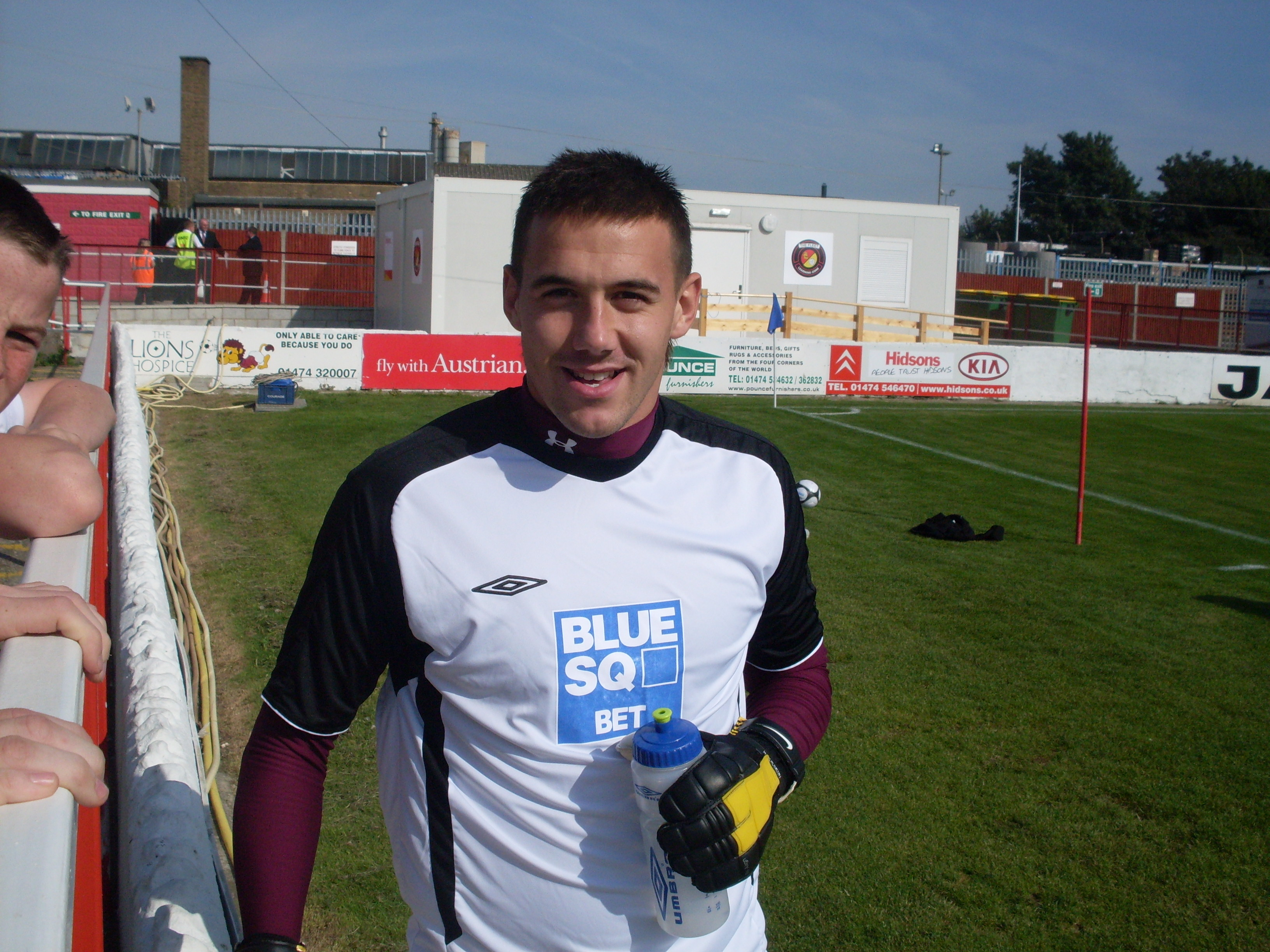
- Pidgeley with Woking in 2008

Personal information
- Full name: Leonard James Pidgeley
- Date of birth: 7 February 1984 (age 42)
- Place of birth: Twickenham, England
- Height: 6 ft 4 in (1.93 m)
- Position: Goalkeeper

Youth career
- ?–2003: Chelsea

Senior career*
Years	Team	Apps	(Gls)
2003–2006	Chelsea	2	(0)
2003–2004	→ Watford (loan)	27	(0)
2005	→ Millwall (loan)	0	(0)
2006–2009	Millwall	55	(0)
2008	→ Woking (loan)	16	(0)
2009–2010	Carlisle United	17	(0)
2010	Woking	9	(0)
2010–2011	Bradford City	21	(0)
2011–2012	Exeter City	10	(0)
2012–2015	Newport County	65	(0)
2015	→ Mansfield Town (loan)	15	(0)
2016	Leatherhead	1	(0)
2016	Forest Green Rovers	0	(0)
2016–2017	Hastings United	35	(0)
2017	Margate		
2018	Farnborough	6	(0)
Total		269	(0)

International career
2000–2001	England U16	13	(0)
2002	England U18	1	(0)
2003	England U19	1	(0)
2004	England U20	1	(0)
- * Club domestic league appearances and goals

Leonard James Pidgeley (born 7 February 1984) is an English former footballer who played as a goalkeeper.

== Career ==
Pidgeley was born in Twickenham, London. He initially signed up with Chelsea at the opening of the 2002–03 season, and was loaned out to Watford between September 2003 and May 2004, a deal initially intended to last for two months, but which was extended to the end of the season. His made his Watford début on 4 October 2003, coming on as a substitute in Watford's 1–0 win at Crewe Alexandra after the dismissal of Alec Chamberlain.

Due to Carlo Cudicini being suspended, Pidgeley was on the bench as Chelsea won the 2005 Football League Cup final. He then made his debut for Chelsea coming on as a substitute for Cudicini in the final home game of the 2004–05 Premiership season against Charlton Athletic. This meant Pidgeley was on the pitch as Chelsea were presented with the Premier League trophy as English champions. Except for a League Cup game while on loan at Millwall, Pidgeley spent the whole of the 2005–06 season at Chelsea. He spent the season as third choice goalkeeper behind Petr Čech and Cudicini. He was given the number 40 shirt by Chelsea, in reference to his time at Watford when they beat Watford 4–0 in an FA Cup match, with Pidgeley in goal. He made his first starting appearance for the club in the last match of the season against Newcastle United at St James' Park, after Cudicini had suffered an injury in the pre-match warm up.

Pidgeley has previously been selected for the England under-21 squad.

Pidgeley sought first-team football, and signed a three-year contract with Millwall in League One on 10 June 2006. He became their first choice goalkeeper in the 2006–07 season, before injury and the arrival of new manager Kenny Jackett during the following season.

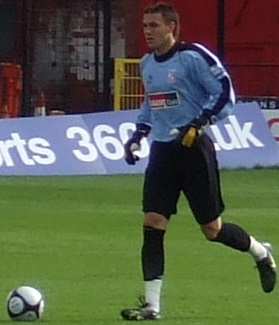
Pidgeley playing for Woking in 2008

In August 2008, he signed a one-month loan with Woking. On his last home league game for Woking before returning to Millwall he saved a penalty from Steve Morison against Woking's rivals Stevenage Borough. Pidgeley had been tipped to go into talks with League One side Carlisle United during 2009–10 pre-season. He signed a one-year deal with the Cumbrians on 8 July after the departure of Ben Williams to Colchester United.

He spent the first two months of the 2010–11 season with Conference South side Woking, before leaving in September 2010 after making nine appearances for the club. On 26 October 2010, he was given a trial with League Two club Bradford City appearing for Bradford's reserves against Sheffield United. He made his debut on 30 October in a 5–0 win against Oxford United.

In June 2011, Pidgeley signed on a free transfer for League One side Exeter City on a one-year contract. In May 2012, Pidgeley was released by Exeter after the club was relegated from Football League One.

In August 2012, Pidgeley signed a short-term contract with Newport County as cover for the injured Alan Julian. At County, Lenny was also given the number 40 shirt and he was ever-present in the team as County topped the league after 11 matches. Due to his fine form and ongoing injury to Alan Julian his contract was extended in September 2012 until the end of the 2012–13 season. Newport finished 3rd in the league, reaching the Conference playoffs. Newport County won the play-off final against Wrexham at Wembley Stadium 2–0 to return to the Football League after a 25-year absence with promotion to League Two. For the first time in Conference history, the winning team had not conceded a single goal in the play-offs.

On 2 February 2015 Pidgeley joined Mansfield Town on loan until the end of the 2014–15 season. He was released by Newport in May 2015 at the end of his contract.

In January 2016, Pidgeley dropped into non-league to sign for Isthmian League side Leatherhead. Three months later however, in March 2016, he signed for National League side Forest Green Rovers. Following the sacking of Adrian Pennock, he went on to take on a temporary goalkeeper coach role at Forest Green under the caretaker management of Scott Bartlett, as the club reached the 2015–16 National League play-off final at Wembley Stadium only to lose 3–1 against Grimsby Town.

On 27 July 2016, Pidgeley joined Isthmian League Division One South side Hastings United, joining former Chelsea teammate Steven Watt. On 13 August 2016, Pidgeley made his Hastings United debut in a 4–1 victory over South Park.

On 17 May 2017, Pidgeley joined Isthmian League Premier Division side Margate.

On 17 May 2018, Pidgeley joined Southern Football League side Farnborough. On 12 September, Farnborough announced Pidgeley's decision to retire due to mental health problems, which led to media backlash after the club's poor handling of the subject.

== Honours ==
Chelsea

- Football League Cup: 2004–05

Carlisle United

- Football League Trophy runner-up: 2009–10

Newport County

- Conference Premier play-offs: 2013
