= Kieron Forbes =

English footballer

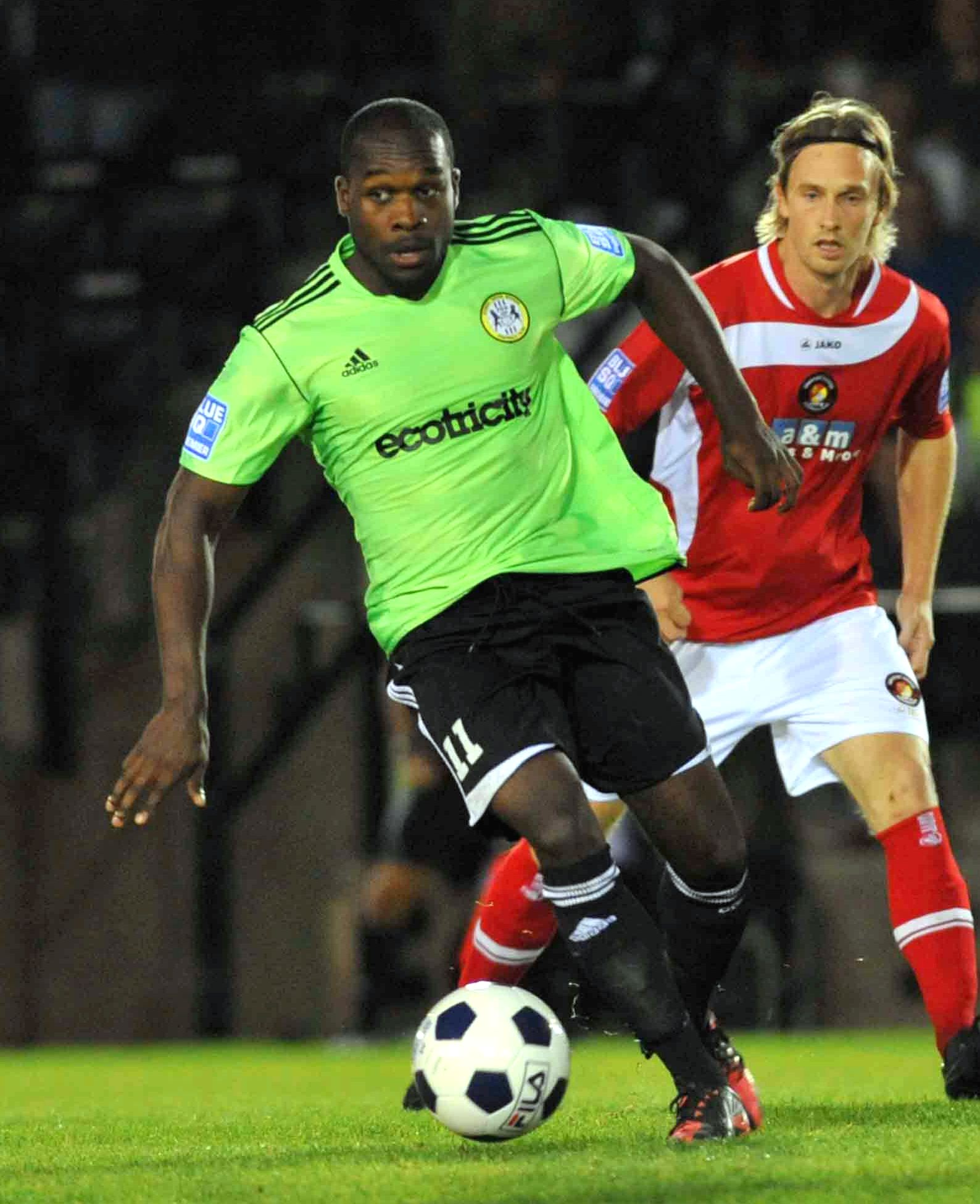
- Forbes (left) playing for Forest Green Rovers in 2012/13

Personal information
- Full name: Kieron Emerson Forbes
- Date of birth: 17 August 1990 (age 36)
- Place of birth: Wembley, England
- Position: Midfielder

Team information
- Current team: Hitchin Town

Youth career
- ?–2007: Watford

Senior career*
Years	Team	Apps	(Gls)
2007–2008	Watford	0	(0)
2008–2010	Wealdstone	81	(3)
2010–2015	Forest Green Rovers	107	(5)
2014	→ Whitehawk (loan)	14	(1)
2014–2015	→ Aldershot Town (loan)	29	(0)
2015	→ Sutton United (loan)	7	(0)
2015–2017	Maidenhead United	39	(2)
2017–2018	Farnborough	10	(0)
2018–2019	Biggleswade Town		
2019–	Hendon	16	(0)

International career
2012–	England C	4	(0)
- * Club domestic league appearances and goals as of 22:00, 25 November 2019 (UTC)

Kieron Emerson Forbes (born 17 August 1990) is an English professional footballer who plays as a midfielder for Hitchin Town. He has represented his country with the England C team.

== Club career ==
Born in Wembley, London, Forbes made his debut for Watford against Gillingham in the League Cup on 14 August 2007. He came on for Jordan Parkes in the 66th minute, and played in midfield.

At the end of his scholarship the decision was made not to offer Forbes a professional contract, and he was released.

Upon his release from Watford, Forbes joined Isthmian Premier League club Wealdstone.

In December 2010 Forbes signed for Conference National side Forest Green Rovers after he spent time training with the club. As part of the deal to bring Forbes to The New Lawn there was a nominal transfer fee involved as well as a sell on clause in the players contract.

Forbes made his Forest Green debut coming off the bench in a 4–2 away win over Bath City on 28 December 2010. He then scored his first goal for Forest Green on 26 March 2011 in a 1–1 away draw against Cambridge United. Forbes agreed a new contract with Forest Green to stay with the club for the 2011–12 season. Following further impressive performances for Forest Green, in December 2011 Forbes agreed a contract extension keeping him at The New Lawn until the end of the 2012–13 season. A few months later, in June 2012, Forbes signed another contract extension to keep him at Forest Green until the end of the 2014–15 season.

In May 2013, he was awarded the England C Player of the Year award at the Non-League Paper's National Game Awards ceremony held at Fulham's Craven Cottage. He made his hundredth league appearance for Forest Green on 24 September 2013 against Tamworth.

In February 2014, Forbes joined Whitehawk on loan until the end of the 2013–14 season. He returned to Forest Green at the end of the season. After featuring in two pre-season games at the start of the 2014–15 season, it was announced that he had joined Forest Green's league rivals Aldershot Town on a six-month loan deal. He made his Aldershot Town debut on 9 August 2014, playing the full 90 minutes in a 3–1 home win over Altrincham. He was a part of the Aldershot squad that caused an FA Cup upset, beating Portsmouth in a first round replay on 18 November 2014.

On 2 February 2015, he returned to Forest Green when his loan at Aldershot had come to an end. A month later, in March 2015, he moved on loan to Sutton United in a one-month deal. He made his Sutton United debut on 3 March 2015 in a 2–1 loss against Bromley. He ended the 2014-15 season with Sutton, and on completion of his loan spell, it was confirmed that he had been released by Forest Green after five years with the club on 4 May 2015.

Following his departure from Forest Green, Forbes signed for Maidenhead United in August 2015.

In July 2017, Forbes signed for Farnborough.

Forbes became manager Lee Allinson's first signing for Biggleswade Town on 8 May 2018.

Forbes rejoined manager Lee Allinson on 23 November 2019, when he swapped Biggleswade Town for Hendon. Forbes is now playing at Hitchin Town FC where he continues to show his talent in the middle of the park producing performances, showing how he managed to become an England International and his talents on the world stage.

== International career ==
In February 2012, Forbes received a call up to the England C team squad and made his England debut in a 1–1 draw with Italy. He then earned his second cap on 5 June 2012 in a 4–0 away defeat against the Russia under 21s national team at the Khimky Arena in Moscow. In August 2012, Forbes received a third call up to the England C squad for an International Challenge Trophy tie against Belgium. Forbes went on to earn his third cap with victory over Belgium. Forbes earned his fourth cap for the England C side on 5 February 2013 in a 1–0 defeat against Turkey in the semi-final of the International Challenge Trophy.

== Personal life ==
His brother is former Norwich City and Swansea City midfielder Adrian Forbes.
