= Ryan Robinson (English footballer) =

English footballer (born 1982)

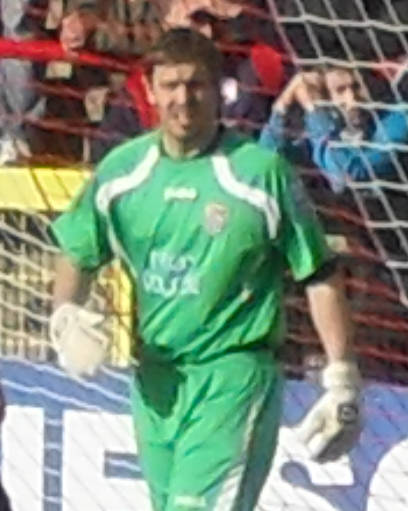
- Robinson playing for Bath City in 2010

Personal information
- Full name: Ryan Robinson
- Date of birth: 13 October 1982 (age 44)
- Place of birth: Kendal, England
- Height: 6 ft 2 in (1.88 m)
- Position: Goalkeeper

Senior career*
Years	Team	Apps	(Gls)
2001–2003	Blackburn Rovers	0	(0)
2003–2004	Southend United	2	(0)
2004–2007	Morecambe	38	(0)
2006–2007	→ Southport (loan)	16	(0)
2007–2009	Forest Green Rovers	69	(0)
2009–2011	Bath City	32	(0)
2011–2012	AFC Telford United	0	(0)
2011	Evesham United (dual registration)	1	(0)
2012–????	Northwich Victoria		
- Kendal Town
- * Club domestic league appearances and goals

Ryan Robinson (born 13 October 1982) is an English former footballer who played as a goalkeeper.

== Career ==
Born in Kendal, Cumbria, Robinson began his career with Blackburn Rovers, before being released in 2001, aged 20. He joined Southend United, where he got his first taste of first-team action, playing in two Football League games. He was released by Southend after one year, and has since played for a number of Conference clubs – Morecambe, Southport and, since 2006, Forest Green.

Robinson moved near to his family home when he joined Morecambe. He quickly made the goalkeeper jersey his own through a series of excellent displays. However, after being injured Morecambe brought in loan keeper Steven Drench from nearby Blackburn Rovers. Drench similarly excelled and took Robinson's first-team spot.

Following an injury to Drench, Robinson again took his place as first team goalkeeper. However a poor game saw him spend the remainder of the season on the bench. At the end of the 2005–06 season Drench signed for Morecambe and Robinson, unhappy at playing second fiddle, was allowed to leave and was quickly snapped up by former Morecambe manager Jim Harvey who had just taken over at Forest Green Rovers.

After two seasons at The New Lawn Robinson dropped into semi professional football when he signed for Bath City in May 2009 after Forest Green failed to offer him a new contract.

Robinson struggled for fitness for the early part of the 2009–10 season with Bath however after shaking off a back problem he began to feature regularly for Bath including a 2–1 FA Cup second round defeat to his former side, Forest Green in November 2009.

In May 2010, Robinson kept a clean sheet in the Conference South play-off final to help earn Bath City promotion to the Conference National with a 1–0 victory over Woking. Following a season back in the top flight of non-league football, Robinsonw was released at the end of the 2010–11 season.

Robinson featured as a triallist in a game for Cheltenham Town against Cirencester Town on 9 July 2011 however was not in contention to win a contract as Cheltenham boss Mark Yates already had a signing lined up ahead of Robinson. He also featured again as a triallist with Worcester City in July 2011 in a game against Pershore Town.

In August 2011, Robinson made his debut for Evo Stik Southern Premier Division club Evesham United in a game against Oxford City. Robinson also joined Conference side, AFC Telford United in September 2011 as a backup goalkeeper on non-contract terms. He was released by the club in May 2012.

The following month he joined Northwich Victoria.

== Honours ==
Bath City

- Conference South Play-off Winner: 1

2009–10
