= Martin Foster (footballer) =

English footballer (born 1977)

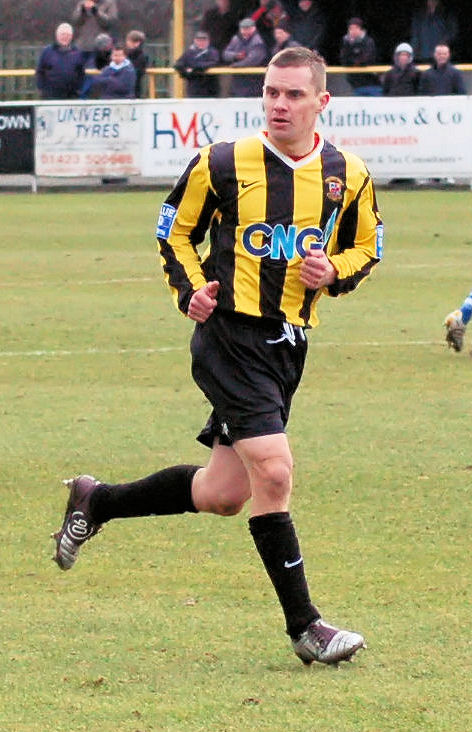
- Foster with Harrogate Town in 2010

Personal information
- Full name: Martin Foster
- Date of birth: 29 October 1977 (age 49)
- Place of birth: Rotherham, England
- Position: Midfielder

Team information
- Current team: Guiseley (first team coach)

Senior career*
Years	Team	Apps	(Gls)
1994–1998	Leeds United		
1997	→ Blackpool (loan)	1	(0)
1998–1999	Greenock Morton	19	(0)
1999	→ Doncaster Rovers (loan)		
1999–2001	Doncaster Rovers	28	(1)
2000	→ Ilkeston Town (loan)		
2001–2004	Forest Green Rovers	134	(5)
2004–2007	Halifax Town	94	(7)
2007	Oxford United	13	(0)
2007–2008	Rushden & Diamonds	20	(0)
2008–2009	Tamworth	60	(0)
2009–2009	Eastwood Town	20	(0)
2009	Harrogate Town	49	(0)
2015–2016	Hull United		

Managerial career
- 2014–2015: Matlock Town (joint)
- 2016–2017: Gainsborough Trinity (assistant)
- 2017–2018: Sheffield (assistant)
- 2019: Tadcaster Albion (assistant)
- 2019: Gainsborough Trinity (assistant)
- 2021-: Guiseley A.F.C (first team coach)
- * Club domestic league appearances and goals

Martin Foster (born 29 October 1977) is an English former footballer who played as a midfielder. He is now a first team coach at Guiseley AFC in the Northern Premier League.

== Career ==
Born in Rotherham, South Yorkshire, Foster started his career with Leeds United but did not make any senior appearances for the club. He moved to Scottish football to sign for Greenock Morton having had experience in a loan spell with Blackpool during his time at Elland Road.

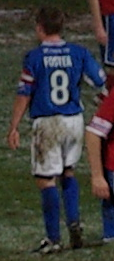
Foster playing for Halifax Town in 2007

After a short period in Scotland, Foster returned to English football with Doncaster Rovers where his opportunities were limited, though he had a spell with Ilkeston Town on loan. In 2001, he signed for Forest Green Rovers in the Conference National. He made well over 100 appearances for the club and had a spell as captain. He also appeared for Forest Green in the 2001 FA Trophy final at Villa Park but was on the losing side in a 1–0 defeat to Canvey Island. He was highly regarded amongst the supporters at The Lawn and many were sad to see him leave when he departed for Halifax Town in 2004. He made just under 100 league appearances for Halifax at The Shay before a move in 2007 to Oxford United.

Foster only had a short spell at the Kassam Stadium with Oxford in the Conference National before moving to fellow Conference club Rushden & Diamonds. After a short period with Rushden at Nene Park he departed to drop down into the Conference North to play for Tamworth. In January 2008 he signed an 18-month contract with the Staffordshire-based club.

In June 2009, Foster became the fourth player to sign for Conference North new boys Eastwood Town. A lack of games for the Coronation Park side, however, saw Foster make the move to Conference North rivals Harrogate Town on 10 December 2009. Foster made his debut for Town in a 3–1 win over Hinckley United on 19 January 2010.
