= Kyle Patten =

Welsh footballer

Personal information
- Date of birth: 21 July 1994 (age 32)
- Place of birth: Wales
- Position: Defender

Senior career*
Years	Team	Apps	(Gls)
2014–2015	Newport County	1	(0)
2014	→ Bath City (loan)	0	(0)
2015	→ Merthyr Town (loan)	0	(0)
2016–2020	Merthyr Town	90	(1)
2020–2021	Barry Town United	16	(0)
2021-2024	Haverfordwest County	43	(3)
- * Club domestic league appearances and goals as of 4 March 2024

Kyle Patten is a Welsh professional football midfielder who is a free agent, having last played for Cymru Premier side Haverfordwest County.

== Career ==
Patten is a product of the Newport County Academy. In September 2014 Patten signed his first professional contract with Newport County under manager Justin Edinburgh. In the same month Patten joined Bath City on a one-month loan.

He was released by Newport in May 2015.
