= Alex Meechan =

English footballer (born 1980)

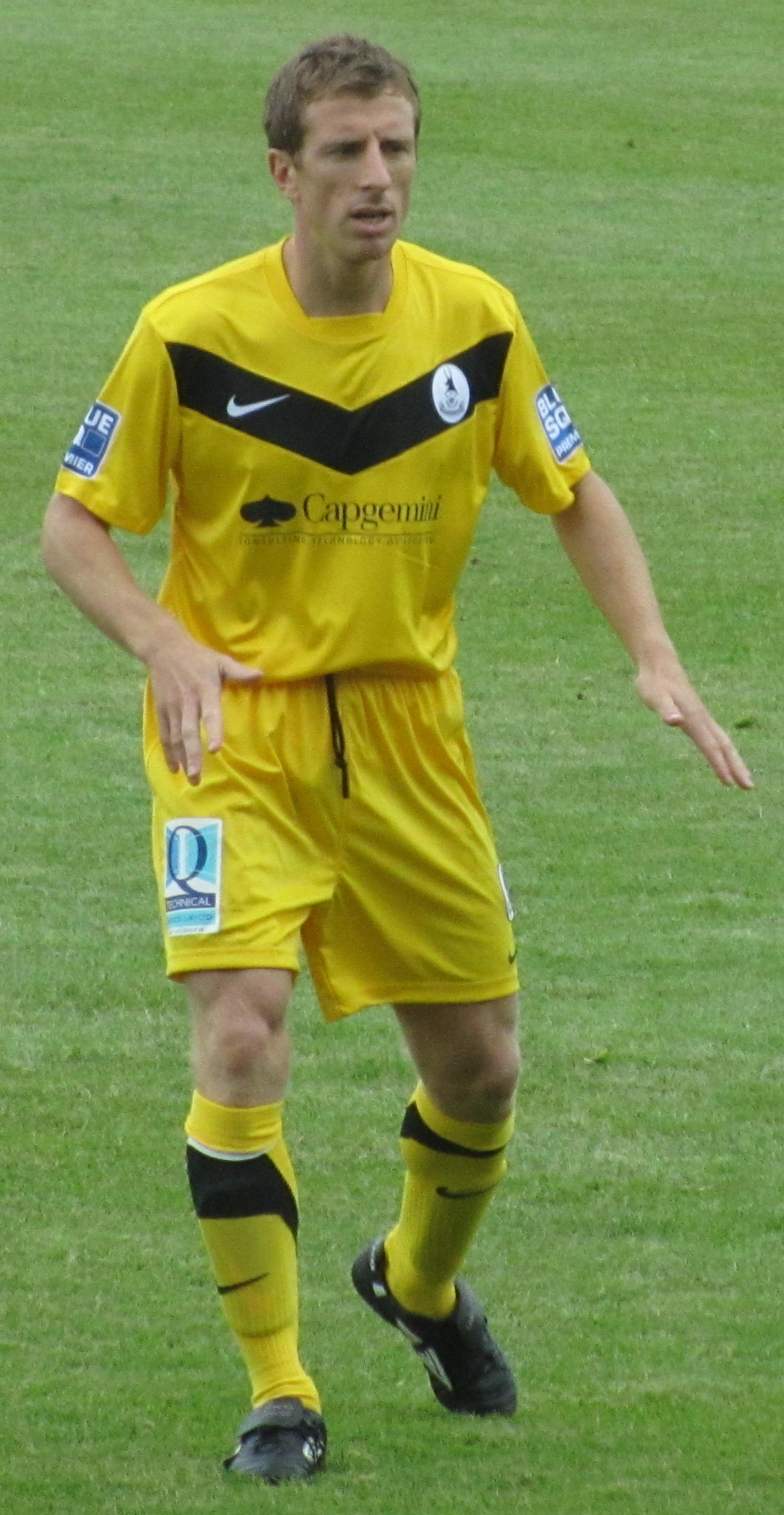
- Meechan playing for AFC Telford United in 2011

Personal information
- Date of birth: 29 January 1980 (age 46)
- Place of birth: Plymouth, England
- Positions: Midfielder; striker

Team information
- Current team: Bradford Park Avenue (Academy Head Coach)

Youth career
- Norwich City

Senior career*
| Years | Team | Apps | (Gls) |
| 1997–1998 | Swindon Town | 1 | (0) |
| 1998–2001 | Bristol City | 13 | (4) |
| 2000 | → Yeovil Town (loan) | 1 | (0) |
| 2001–2003 | Forest Green Rovers | 99 | (33) |
| 2003 | Dagenham & Redbridge | 16 | (2) |
| 2003–2004 | Forest Green Rovers | 22 | (6) |
| 2004 | Leigh RMI | 15 | (1) |
| 2004–2005 | Halifax Town | 8 | (1) |
| 2005–2007 | Forest Green Rovers | 70 | (7) |
| 2007 | Chester City | 8 | (0) |
| 2007 | York City | 7 | (1) |
| 2007–2008 | Stalybridge Celtic | 21 | (10) |
| 2008–2009 | Altrincham | 28 | (3) |
| 2009–2010 | Droylsden | 22 | (2) |
| 2010–2012 | AFC Telford United | 31 | (4) |
| 2011 | → Harrogate Town (loan) | 12 | (1) |
| 2012 | Harrogate Town | 23 | (3) |
| 2012 | Worcester City | ? | (?) |
| 2012–2013 | Witton Albion | 4 | (0) |
| 2013 | Colwyn Bay | ? | (?) |
| 2013 | AFC Telford United | 7 | (0) |
| 2013–2015 | Barrow | 4 | (0) |
| Total | | 412 | (78) |

Managerial career
- 2013: AFC Telford United (player/assistant manager)
- 2013: Barrow (player/assistant manager)
- 2013: Barrow (caretaker manager)
- 2016: Bradford Park Avenue (Academy Head Coach)
- 2019: Stafford Rangers (Joint Manager)
- 2021: AFC Telford United (Assistant Manager)
- * Club domestic league appearances and goals as of 18:21, 31 August 2015 (UTC)

Alexander Thomas Meechan (born 29 January 1980) is an English former footballer who played as a striker and midfielder.

== Career ==
Meechan was born in Plymouth, England and attended St Boniface's Catholic College. He was an Associate Schoolboy at Norwich City in the 1994–95 season. He moved to Swindon Town in 1997. He was signed by Bristol City in 1998. During this spell he spent time on loan with Yeovil Town, who were in the Football Conference at the time.

Meechan was signed by Forest Green Rovers in 2001. he played for the club in the 2001 FA Trophy final at Villa Park. He was signed by Dagenham & Redbridge on a two-year deal in 2003. Dagenham had come within a whisker of promotion to The Football League in the previous two seasons but this spell was not to provide the dream ticket for Meechan, as the Daggers languished in mid-table in the 2003–04 season. Meechan re-joined Forest Green on a three-month loan in November 2003, after which he was released by the club. Meechan was re-signed by Forest Green Rovers following his release by Dagenham. He was signed by Leigh RMI in 2004.

Meechan was signed by Halifax Town in November 2004. After his release by Halifax, Meechan returned for his third spell with Forest Green Rovers in 2005. He was released by Forest Green and joined Chester City on 30 January 2007 until the end of the season. This provided Meechan with a surprise return to Football League circles, although he was to rarely be in the starting line-up. He was moved from striker to the wing, a position he struggled in. He was released in May 2007 after failing to establish himself in the Chester side.

Meechan was signed by Conference Premier club York City on 10 July 2007 on a short-term contract. He was left out for eight games after his performance against Forest Green Rovers but returned to the side against Halifax Town, where he scored a winning goal from the substitute bench. He was released by the club when his short-term contract came to an end in November 2007. He signed for Conference North side Stalybridge Celtic in November 2007. He returned to the Conference Premier after joining Altrincham in July 2008. On 27 March 2009, Meechan had his contract cancelled by mutual consent and immediately rejoined former club Stalybridge Celtic later that day. On 9 July, Meechan joined Tameside rivals Droylsden. At the end of the season Meechan moved to fellow Conference North side AFC Telford United. After earning promotion to the Conference Premier through the play-offs, Meechan agreed a new one-year deal with the club for the 2011–12 season. In the 2011–12 season he went on a 1-month loan spell at Harrogate Town where he scored on his debut. He then joined Harrogate permanently. Meechan was offered a new contract with the Conference North club for the 2012–13 season in May 2012.

In October 2012, Meechan left Harrogate Town to join Conference North rivals Worcester City. In December 2012 he was however released by Worcester because of budget constraints. He then joined Witton Albion in December 2012.

On 17 January 2013 he joined Conference North side Colwyn Bay.

On 11 March 2013 he left Colwyn Bay to become assistant manager at one of his former teams AFC Telford United. It was also announced the next day that Meechan will also become a player due to injuries. He made his second debut for the club on 19 March 2013 in a 2–1 defeat against Macclesfield Town.

On 10 May 2013 it was announced in AFC Telford United's local paper that Meechan was leaving them to join Barrow in the Conference North after not being offered a new contract at Telford. He took on a coaching role.

On 13 June 2016 he was appointed manager of Bradford Park Avenue. after initially arriving at the club as assistant manager however when his head manager failed to arrive at the club Meechan found himself as the manager. The team however failed to win a match under his short tenure and he was relieved of his duties.

A role was found at the club as academy manager which Meechan filled until February 2019.
