= 2020–21 Forest Green Rovers F.C. season =

Forest Green Rovers
2020–21 season
- Chairman: Dale Vince
- Head Coach: Mark Cooper (until 11 April); Jimmy Ball (interim as of 11 April)
- Stadium: The New Lawn
- League Two: 6th (lost playoffs semi-final)
- FA Cup: First round
- EFL Cup: First round
- EFL Trophy: Second round
- Top goalscorer: League: Jamille Matt (17); All: Jamille Matt (17)
Home colours	Away colours	Third colours

The 2020–21 season was Forest Green Rovers' 132nd season in their history and the fourth consecutive season in EFL League Two. Along with League Two, the club also participated in this season's editions of the FA Cup, EFL Cup and EFL Trophy.

The season covers the period from 1 July 2020 to 30 June 2021.

== Transfers ==
=== Transfers in ===
Date	Position	Nationality	Name	From	Fee	Ref.
1 July 2020	CB	(England)	Dan Sweeney	(England) Barnet	Free transfer	
3 July 2020	LM	(Scotland)	Nicky Cadden	(Scotland) Greenock Morton	Free transfer	
7 July 2020	LB	(England)	Jack Evans	(England) Blackburn Rovers	Free transfer	
8 July 2020	RB	(England)	Kane Wilson	(England) West Bromwich Albion	Free transfer	
15 July 2020	GK	(England)	Luke McGee	(England) Portsmouth	Free transfer	
16 July 2020	FW	(England)	Jake Young	(England) Sheffield United	Free transfer	
20 July 2020	CF	(Jamaica)	Jamille Matt	(Wales) Newport County	Free transfer	
21 July 2020	CB	(England)	Jordan Moore-Taylor	(England) Milton Keynes Dons	Free transfer	
10 August 2020	CM	(England)	Elliott Whitehouse	(England) Grimsby Town	Free transfer	
26 August 2020	RM	(England)	Scott Wagstaff	(England) AFC Wimbledon	Free transfer	
7 January 2021	CB	(England)	Baily Cargill	(England) Milton Keynes Dons	Undisclosed	

=== Loans in ===
Date from	Position	Nationality	Name	To	Date until	Ref.
23 September 2020	RB	(England)	Jayden Richardson	(England) Nottingham Forest	End of season	
16 October 2020	AM	(England)	Odin Bailey	(England) Birmingham City	End of season	
11 January 2021	LW	(England)	Isaac Hutchinson	(England) Derby County	End of season	
19 January 2021	CF	(England)	Josh Davison	(England) Charlton Athletic	End of season	

=== Loans out ===
Date from	Position	Nationality	Name	To	Date until	Ref.
15 August 2020	GK	(England)	Adam Smith	(England) Yeovil Town	End of season	
8 October 2020	CF	(United States)	Vaughn Covil	(England) Salisbury	November 2020	
12 October 2020	LW	(England)	Taylor Allen	(England) Hednesford Town		
27 November 2020	LW	(England)	Taylor Allen	(England) Leamington	December 2020	
1 December 2020	LB	(England)	Jack Evans	(England) Hungerford Town	January 2021	
5 January 2021	CF	(England)	Josh March	(England) Harrogate Town	End of season	
5 January 2021	CF	(England)	Matty Stevens	(England) Stevenage	End of season	
8 February 2021	LB	(England)	Jack Evans	(England) Gloucester City	March 2021	

=== Transfers out ===
Date	Position	Nationality	Name	To	Fee	Ref.
1 July 2020	RM	(Republic of Ireland)	Kevin Dawson	(England) Gloucester City	Released	
1 July 2020	LM	(England)	Elliott Frear	(Scotland) Heart of Midlothian	Released	
1 July 2020	LW	(England)	Dayle Grubb	(England) Weston-super-Mare	Released	
1 July 2020	CB	(England)	Nathan McGinley	(Scotland) Motherwell	Free transfer	
1 July 2020	CB	(England)	Matt Mills	Retired		
1 July 2020	LW	(England)	Junior Mondal	(England) AFC Fylde	Released	
1 July 2020	CB	(England)	Farrend Rawson	(England) Mansfield Town	Released	
1 July 2020	RB	(Wales)	Liam Shephard	(Wales) Newport County	Released	
1 July 2020	AM	(Wales)	George Williams	(England) Grimsby Town	Released	
2 July 2020	MF	(England)	Oliver Artwell	(England) Hungerford Town	Free transfer	
31 July 2020	RB	(England)	Alfie Saunders	(England) Aldershot Town	Free transfer	
8 August 2020	LB	(England)	Joseph Mills	(England) Northampton Town	Free transfer	
3 September 2020	RB	(England)	Daniel Bradshaw	(England) Winchester City	Free transfer	
5 January 2021	CB	(England)	Liam Kitching	(England) Barnsley	Undisclosed	
10 January 2021	CM	(Northern Ireland)	Carl Winchester	(England) Sunderland	Undisclosed	

== Pre-season ==
15 August 2020 Friendly	Yate Town	0–2	Forest Green Rovers	Yate
15:00 BST		Report	Winchester 79'; March 88'	Stadium: Lodge Road; Attendance: 0

18 August 2020 Friendly	Melksham Town	0–6	Forest Green Rovers	Melksham
19:00 BST		Report	Collins x2 March x2 Stevens; Whitehouse	Stadium: Oakfield Stadium; Attendance: 0

22 August 2020 Friendly	Forest Green Rovers	4–3	Bristol Rovers	Nailsworth
13:00 BST	Cadden 20'; Wilson 35'; Adams 51'; Winchester 67'	Report		Stadium: The New Lawn; Attendance: 0

29 August 2020 Friendly	Plymouth Argyle	2–1	Forest Green Rovers	Plymouth
13:00 BST	Hardie 41'; Jephcott 87'	Report	Sweeney 50'	Stadium: Home Park; Attendance: 0

1 September 2020 Friendly	Swansea City	2–1	Forest Green Rovers	Swansea
13:30 BST	Lowe 9'; Dhanda 28'	Report	Wilson 36'	Stadium: Liberty Stadium; Attendance: 0 Referee: Dean John

== Competitions ==
=== EFL League Two ===
==== League table ====
Pos	Team	Pld	W	D	L	GF	GA	GD	Pts	Promotion, qualification or relegation
2	Cambridge United (P)	46	24	8	14	73	49	+24	80	Promotion to the EFL League One
3	Bolton Wanderers (P)	46	23	10	13	59	50	+9	79	Promotion to the EFL League One
4	Morecambe (O, P)	46	23	9	14	69	58	+11	78	Qualification for League Two play-offs
5	Newport County	46	20	13	13	57	42	+15	73	Qualification for League Two play-offs
6	Forest Green Rovers	46	20	13	13	59	51	+8	73	Qualification for League Two play-offs
7	Tranmere Rovers	46	20	13	13	55	50	+5	73	Qualification for League Two play-offs
8	Salford City	46	19	14	13	54	34	+20	71	
9	Exeter City	46	18	16	12	71	50	+21	70	
10	Carlisle United	46	18	12	16	60	51	+9	66	

Updated to match(es) played on 31 May 2021. Source: EFL Official Website
Rules for classification: 1) Points; 2) Goal difference; 3) Number of goals scored; 4) Head-to-head results; 5) Wins; 6) Away goals; 7) Penalty points (sec 9.5); 8) 12-point sending off offences
(O) Play-off winners; (P) Promoted

==== Results summary ====
Overall								Home						Away					
Pld	W	D	L	GF	GA	GD	Pts	W	D	L	GF	GA	GD	W	D	L	GF	GA	GD
46	20	13	13	59	51	+8	73	10	7	6	31	27	+4	10	6	7	28	24	+4

Last updated: 8 May 2021.
Source: BBC

==== Results by matchday ====
Matchday	1	2	3	4	5	6	7	8	9	10	11	12	13	14	15	16	17	18	19	20	21	22	23	24	25	26	27	28	29	30	31	32	33	34	35	36	37	38	39	40	41	42	43	44	45	46
Ground	A	H	A	H	A	H	A	A	H	A	H	H	A	A	H	A	H	A	H	A	H	H	A	A	H	A	H	A	H	H	A	A	H	H	A	A	H	A	H	A	H	H	A	H	H	A
Result	W	D	D	D	W	W	L	W	W	L	W	L	D	W	D	W	W	D	W	D	L	D	L	W	D	W	W	W	L	W	L	W	D	W	L	D	L	L	L	L	W	D	D	L	W	W
Position	5	8	10	10	6	4	8	4	3	6	3	5	5	4	4	3	4	4	2	2	2	4	4	2	3	2	2	2	2	2	3	3	3	3	3	3	5	5	5	6	6	6	6	8	7	6

Updated to match(es) played on 8 May 2021. Source: 11v11 for league tables and fixtures
A = Away; H = Home; W = Win; D = Draw; L = Loss

==== Matches ====
Win Draw Loss Postponed

The 2020–21 season fixtures were released on 21 August.

12 September 2020 1	Bolton Wanderers	0–1	Forest Green Rovers	Horwich
15:00 BST	Comley (yellow card) 40'; Greenidge (yellow card) 49'; Baptiste (yellow card) 54'	Report	Kitching (yellow card) 35'; Winchester 50'	Stadium: University of Bolton Stadium; Attendance: 0 Referee: Seb Stockbridge

19 September 2020 2	Forest Green Rovers	2–2	Bradford City	Nailsworth
15:00 BST	Winchester 60' (penalty missed) 63'; Kitching (yellow card) 82'; Collins 90+6' (yellow card) 90+6'	Report	Novak 49'; O'Connor (red card) 62'; Watt 66' (yellow card) 73'; O'Connor (red card) 70'	Stadium: The New Lawn; Attendance: 1,000; Referee: Will Finnie

26 September 2020 3	Salford City	0–0	Forest Green Rovers	Salford
15:00 BST	Turnbull (yellow card) 18'; Hunter (yellow card) 84'	Report	Cadden (yellow card) 59'	Stadium: Moor Lane; Attendance: 0 Referee: Thomas Bramall

3 October 2020 4	Forest Green Rovers	1–1	Walsall	Nailsworth
15:00 BST	Matt 61'; Kitching (yellow card) 75'	Report	Lavery 14'; Holden (yellow card) 36'; Jules (yellow card) 77'	Stadium: The New Lawn; Attendance: 0 Referee: Antony Coggins

10 October 2020 5	Scunthorpe United	1–4	Forest Green Rovers	Scunthorpe
15:00 BST	Jarvis 9'; Spence (yellow card) 61'; Bedeau (yellow card) 79'	Report	Matt 24', 32', 83'; Winchester (yellow card) 90+1'; Stevens 90+5'	Stadium: Glanford Park; Attendance: 0 Referee: Ross Joyce

17 October 2020 6	Forest Green Rovers	1–0	Stevenage	Nailsworth
15:00 BST	Young 23'; Kitching (yellow card) 45'	Report	Prosser (yellow card) 49'; Read (yellow card) 82'	Stadium: The New Lawn; Attendance: 0 Referee: James Bell

20 October 2020 7	Colchester United	1–0	Forest Green Rovers	Colchester
19:00 BST	Chilvers 2' (yellow card) 42'; Eastman (yellow card) 67'; Bramall (yellow card) 77'; Pell (yellow card) 80'	Report	Stokes (yellow card) 52'; Winchester (yellow card) 90'	Stadium: Colchester Community Stadium; Attendance: 0 Referee: Carl Brook

24 October 2020 8	Morecambe	1–2	Forest Green Rovers	Morecambe
15:00 BST	Leitch-Smith 19'; Lavelle (yellow card) 21'; Hendrie (yellow card) 64'; Wildig (yellow card) 74'; Knight-Percival (yellow card) 87'	Report	Godwin-Malife (yellow card) 74'; Young 79'; Matt 83' (yellow card) 87'	Stadium: Globe Arena; Attendance: 0 Referee: Michael Salisbury

27 October 2020 9	Forest Green Rovers	1–0	Grimsby Town	Nailsworth
19:00 GMT	Young 24'; Winchester (yellow card) 48'; Godwin-Malife (yellow card) 90+4'	Report	Taylor (yellow card) 90+2'; Green (yellow card) 90+3'	Stadium: The New Lawn; Attendance: 0 Referee: James Adcock

31 October 2020 10	Cheltenham Town	2–1	Forest Green Rovers	Cheltenham
15:00 GMT	Boyle 11' (yellow card) 14'; May (yellow card) 26'; Williams 57'; Sercombe (yellow card) 58'; Clements (yellow card) 73'	Report	Collins 73' (pen.); Adams (yellow card) 76'	Stadium: Whaddon Road; Attendance: 0 Referee: Graham Salisbury

3 November 2020 11	Forest Green Rovers	2–1	Leyton Orient	Nailsworth
19:00 GMT	Bailey 30'; Adams (yellow card) 79'; Stevens 82'; Wilson (yellow card) 90+1'	Report	Turley (yellow card) 29'; Wright 41'	Stadium: The New Lawn; Attendance: 0 Referee: Andy Woolmer

14 November 2020 12	Forest Green Rovers	1–2	Mansfield Town	Nailsworth
15:00 GMT	Cadden (yellow card) 38'; Winchester (yellow card) 45+2'; Bailey 85'	Report	Lapslie 6'; Benning (yellow card) 22'; Charsley 35'	Stadium: The New Lawn; Attendance: 0 Referee: Brett Huxtable

21 November 2020 13	Barrow	2–2	Forest Green Rovers	Barrow-in-Furness
15:00 GMT	Taylor (yellow card) 71'; James 73'; Angus 83' (pen.)	Report	Whitehouse 52'; Moore-Taylor (yellow card) 62'; Kitching (yellow card) 86'; Cadden 90+6'	Stadium: Holker Street; Attendance: 0 Referee: Christopher Sarginson

24 November 2020 14	Southend United	0–1	Forest Green Rovers	Southend-on-Sea
19:00 GMT	Dieng (yellow card) 62'; McCormack (yellow card) 88'	Report	Young 63'	Stadium: Roots Hall; Attendance: 0 Referee: Keith Stroud

1 December 2020 15	Forest Green Rovers	1–1	Newport County	Nailsworth
19:00 GMT	Matt 76' (yellow card) 86'; Kitching (yellow card) 90+5'	Report	Labadie (yellow card) 9'; Abrahams 45+2' (pen.); Shephard (yellow card) 90+5'	Stadium: The New Lawn; Attendance: 0 Referee: Ben Toner

5 December 2020 16	Harrogate Town	0–1	Forest Green Rovers	Harrogate
15:00 GMT		Report	Matt 57'; Winchester (yellow card) 87'	Stadium: Wetherby Road; Attendance: 410; Referee: Marc Edwards

12 December 2020 17	Forest Green Rovers	2–0	Cambridge United	Nailsworth
15:00 GMT	Matt (yellow card) 45+1' (goal) 65' (pen.); Collins 58'	Report		Stadium: The New Lawn; Attendance: 799; Referee: James Oldham

15 December 2020 18	Port Vale	1–1	Forest Green Rovers	Burslem
19:00 GMT	Smith (yellow card) 22'; Stokes 34' (o.g.)	Report	Collins 41' (yellow card) 90+3'; Adams (yellow card) 75'	Stadium: Vale Park; Attendance: 0 Referee: Charles Breakspear

19 December 2020 19	Forest Green Rovers	1–0	Carlisle United	Nailsworth
15:00 GMT	Richardson (yellow card) 50'; Matt 76'	Report	Alessandra (yellow card) 19'; Riley (yellow card) 44'; Farman (yellow card) 50'; Charters (yellow card) 90+1'	Stadium: The New Lawn; Attendance: 920; Referee: Alan Young

26 December 2020 20	Exeter City	1–1	Forest Green Rovers	Exeter
13:00 GMT	Collins 37'	Report	Collins 16'; Godwin-Malife (yellow card) 71'	Stadium: St James Park; Attendance: 1,767; Referee: Brett Huxtable

29 December 2020 21	Forest Green Rovers	1–2	Crawley Town	Nailsworth
19:00 GMT	Young 50'	Report	Nichols 16', 79'; Craig (yellow card) 61'; Davies (yellow card) 90+3'	Stadium: The New Lawn; Attendance: 0 Referee: James Linington

16 January 2021 22	Forest Green Rovers	1–1	Port Vale	Nailsworth
15:00 GMT	Cadden 20'	Report	Rodney 76'	Stadium: The New Lawn; Attendance: 0 Referee: Kevin Johnson

19 January 2021 23	Tranmere Rovers	3–2	Forest Green Rovers	Birkenhead
19:00 GMT	Lewis 12'; Vaughan 47'; Feeney 76'; Davies (yellow card) 87'; Ferrier (yellow card) 90+2'	Report	Whitehouse 65', (yellow card) 72'; Wagstaff (yellow card) 90+2', (goal) 90+3'	Stadium: Prenton Park; Attendance: 0 Referee: Darren Drysdale

23 January 2021 24	Leyton Orient	0–1	Forest Green Rovers	Leyton
15:00 GMT	McAnuff (yellow card) 32'; Happe (yellow card) 54' (yellow-red card) 64'; Brophy (yellow card) 69'	Report	Cadden 23'; Adams (yellow card) 29'; Cargill (yellow card) 45+2'; Davison (yellow card) 90+1'	Stadium: Brisbane Road; Attendance: 0 Referee: John Busby

30 January 2021 25	Forest Green Rovers	0–0	Cheltenham Town	Nailsworth
15:00 GMT	Adams (yellow card) 44' (yellow-red card) 69'	Report	Clements (yellow card) 32'; Boyle (yellow card) 49'	Stadium: The New Lawn; Attendance: 0 Referee: Ollie Yates

2 February 2021 26	Carlisle United	1–2	Forest Green Rovers	Carlisle
18:00 GMT	Touré 72'; Bennett (yellow card) 73'; Riley (yellow card) 76'	Report	Collins 60' (pen.); Bailey 75', (yellow card) 76'; Sweeney (yellow card) 82'; Cargill (yellow card) 90+3' Mark Cooper (yellow card)	Stadium: Brunton Park; Attendance: 0 Referee: Declan Bourne

16 February 2021 27	Forest Green Rovers	4–3	Oldham Athletic	Nailsworth
19:00 GMT	Cargill 12', 35'; Sweeney (yellow card) 57'; Matt 60'; Bailey (yellow card) 64'; Davison 67'	Report	Lawlor (yellow card) 34'; Badan (yellow card) 38'; Grant 40'; Hilßner (yellow card) 45+1'; McAleny 54', 63'	Stadium: The New Lawn; Attendance: 0 Referee: Robert Lewis

21 February 2021 28	Newport County	0–2	Forest Green Rovers	Newport
13:00 GMT	Hartigan (yellow card) 34'; Townsend (yellow card) 62'	Report	Bernard (yellow card) 34'; Davison 43'; Adams (yellow card) 51'; Matt 63' (pen.); Godwin-Malife (yellow card) 67'	Stadium: Rodney Parade; Attendance: 0 Referee: Neil Hair

24 February 2021 29	Forest Green Rovers	1–3	Southend United	Nailsworth
18:00 GMT	Moore-Taylor (yellow card) 35'; Wagstaff (yellow card) 82'; Matt 86'	Report	Hobson 20', (yellow card) 51'; Dieng 55'; Bwomono (yellow card) 67'; Ferguson 70'	Stadium: The New Lawn; Attendance: 0 Referee: Lee Swabey

27 February 2021 30	Forest Green Rovers	3–0	Colchester United	Nailsworth
17:30 GMT	Matt 25', 31'; Adams (red card) 45+2'; Sarpong-Wiredu 67' (o.g.)	Report	Oteh (yellow card) 90+4'	Stadium: The New Lawn; Attendance: 0 Referee: Carl Brook

2 March 2021 31	Stevenage	3–0	Forest Green Rovers	Stevenage
19:00 GMT	Newton 30', 37', (yellow card) 49'; List 64'; Martin (yellow card) 73'	Report	Collins (yellow card) 28'; Cargill (yellow card) 57'; Bailey (yellow card) 90'	Stadium: Broadhall Way; Attendance: 0 Referee: Kevin Johnson

6 March 2021 32	Grimsby Town	1–2	Forest Green Rovers	Cleethorpes
15:00 GMT	Matete (yellow card) 30'; Hanson 38'	Report	Matt 19' (pen.); Adams 66' Mark Cooper (yellow card)	Stadium: Blundell Park; Attendance: 0 Referee: Peter Wright

9 March 2021 33	Forest Green Rovers	2–2	Morecambe	Nailsworth
19:00 GMT	Collins 10'; Stokes (yellow card) 23'; Bernard (yellow card) 38'; Matt 79'	Report	Stockton 22'; O'Sullivan (yellow card) 38'; Gibson (yellow card) 45+4'; Mendes Gomes 90+4'	Stadium: The New Lawn; Attendance: 0 Referee: Trevor Kettle

13 March 2021 34	Forest Green Rovers	2–1	Harrogate Town	Nailsworth
15:00 GMT	Stokes 22'; Wilson 50'; Bernard (yellow card) 53'; Whitehouse (yellow card) 85' (yellow-red card) 90+5'; Thomas (yellow card) 90+1'	Report	Williams 90+1'; Martin (yellow card) 90+5'	Stadium: The New Lawn; Attendance: 0 Referee: Christopher Pollard

20 March 2021 35	Cambridge United	1–0	Forest Green Rovers	Cambridge
15:00 GMT	Mullin (penalty missed) 17'; Ironside (yellow card) 32'; Hoolahan 38'	Report	Wilson (yellow card) 23'; Matt (yellow card) 76'	Stadium: Abbey Stadium; Attendance: 0 Referee: Marc Edwards

23 March 2021 36	Mansfield Town	0–0	Forest Green Rovers	Mansfield
18:00 GMT	Law (yellow card) 65'; McLaughlin (yellow card) 81'; Reid (yellow card) 82'	Report	Wilson (yellow card) 62'	Stadium: Field Mill; Attendance: 0 Referee: David Webb

27 March 2021 37	Forest Green Rovers	0–1	Bolton Wanderers	Nailsworth
12:00 GMT	Collins (yellow card) 76'	Report	Doyle 39'	Stadium: The New Lawn; Attendance: 0 Referee: David Rock

2 April 2021 38	Bradford City	4–1	Forest Green Rovers	Bradford
15:00 BST	Watt 11', (yellow card) 77'; O'Connor (yellow card) 31'; Cook 47', 76'; Canavan (yellow card) 86'; Rowe 90+4'	Report	Young 90'	Stadium: Valley Parade; Attendance: 0 Referee: Antony Backhouse

5 April 2021 39	Forest Green Rovers	0–2	Salford City	Nailsworth
15:00 BST	Adams (yellow card) 55'	Report	Henderson 38', 77'; Threlkeld (yellow card) 46'; Thomas-Asante (yellow card) 64'	Stadium: The New Lawn; Attendance: 0 Referee: Sam Purkiss

10 April 2021 40	Walsall	2–1	Forest Green Rovers	Walsall
15:00 BST	Holden 6'; Clarke 65', (yellow card) 86'; Gordon (yellow card) 78'; Sadler (yellow card) 90+6'	Report	Cargill (yellow card) 60'; Bailey (yellow card) 70'; Moore-Taylor 72'	Stadium: Bescot Stadium; Attendance: 0 Referee: Ross Joyce

17 April 2021 41	Forest Green Rovers	3–2	Scunthorpe United	Nailsworth
12:30 BST	Moore-Taylor 21'; Wilson (yellow card) 47'; Bernard (yellow card) 61'; Adams 72'; Cadden (penalty missed) 79'; Stokes 80'	Report	Clarke (yellow card) 17'; McGahey 45+1'; Eisa 52'; Karacan (yellow card) 69'; Gilliead (yellow card) 83'	Stadium: The New Lawn; Attendance: 0 Referee: Graham Salisbury

20 April 2021 42	Forest Green Rovers	0–0	Exeter City	Nailsworth
19:00 BST	Moore-Taylor (yellow card) 86'	Report		Stadium: The New Lawn; Attendance: 0 Referee: Bobby Madley

24 April 2021 43	Crawley Town	0–0	Forest Green Rovers	Crawley
15:00 BST	McNerney (yellow card) 49'; Wright (yellow card) 65'	Report	Stokes (yellow card) 56'	Stadium: Broadfield Stadium; Attendance: 0 Referee: Josh Smith

27 April 2021 44	Forest Green Rovers	0–2	Barrow	Nailsworth
19:00 BST	Cargill (yellow card) 45+1'; Adams (yellow card) 48'; Stokes (yellow card) 51'; Bernard (yellow card) 76'	Report	Quigley 18' (pen.); Thomas 25'; Beadling (yellow card) 72'	Stadium: The New Lawn; Attendance: 0 Referee: Paul Howard

1 May 2021 45	Forest Green Rovers	2–1	Tranmere Rovers	Nailsworth
15:00 BST	Adams (yellow card) 22' (yellow-red card) 57'; Collins (yellow card) 45+2', (goal) 81' (pen.); Davison 50'	Report	Morris 90+6'	Stadium: The New Lawn; Attendance: 0 Referee: Tom Nield

8 May 2021 46	Oldham Athletic	0–3	Forest Green Rovers	Oldham
15:00 BST	Clarke (yellow card) 36'; Sutton (yellow card) 84'	Report	Collins 63' (pen.), 80'; Bailey 65'	Stadium: Boundary Park; Attendance: 0 Referee: Seb Stockbridge

==== Play-offs ====
18 May 2021 Semi-final first leg	Newport County	2–0	Forest Green Rovers	Newport
20:15 BST	Dolan 31'; Sheehan (yellow card) 45+1'; Collins 56'	Report	Bernard (yellow card) 19'	Stadium: Rodney Parade; Attendance: 900; Referee: Charles Breakspear

23 May 2021 Semi-final second leg	Forest Green Rovers	4–3 (a.e.t.) (4–5 agg.)	Newport County	Nailsworth
18:30 BST	Adams 7'; Collins 8', (yellow card) 41'; Cadden 53'; Matt 87'	Report	Ellison 70'; Labadie 76'; Maynard 119'	Stadium: The New Lawn; Referee: Martin Coy

=== FA Cup ===
The first round draw was made on 26 October 2020.

7 November 2020 First round	Lincoln City	6–2	Forest Green Rovers	Lincoln
15:00 BST	Edun (yellow card) 10'; Grant 17', 24' (pen.) (yellow card) 68'; Johnson 64'; Archibald (yellow card) 74'; Scully 78', 88'; Jones 90+2'	Report	Kitching (yellow card) 23'; Whitehouse 82'; Young 90+4'	Stadium: Sincil Bank; Attendance: 0 Referee: Sam Barrott

=== EFL Cup ===
Win Draw Loss

The first round draw was made on 18 August, live on Sky Sports, by Paul Merson.

5 September 2020 First round	Forest Green Rovers	1–2	Leyton Orient	Nailsworth
15:00 BST	Happe 23' (o.g.); Adams (yellow card) 88'	Report	Johnson 49'; Wilkinson 52'; McAnuff (yellow card) 80'; Angol (yellow card) 90+2'	Stadium: The New Lawn; Attendance: 0 Referee: Craig Hicks

=== EFL Trophy ===
Win Draw Loss

The regional group stage draw was confirmed on 18 August. The second round draw was made by Matt Murray on 20 November, at St Andrew's.

Pos	Div	Team	Pld	W	PW	PL	L	GF	GA	GD	Pts	Qualification
1	L2	Exeter City	3	3	0	0	0	11	5	+6	9	Advance to Round 2
2	L2	Forest Green Rovers	3	1	0	0	2	5	4	+1	3	Advance to Round 2
3	L1	Swindon Town	3	1	0	0	2	6	7	−1	3	
4	ACA	West Bromwich Albion U21	3	1	0	0	2	3	9	−6	3	

Source: EFL.com

8 September 2020 Group stage	Exeter City	3–2	Forest Green Rovers	Exeter
17:00 BST	Ajose 45+1'; Jay 57' (penalty missed) 61'; Key 67'	Report	Stevens 5', 51'; Wagstaff (yellow card) 41'; Evans (yellow card) 71'; Allen (yellow card) 89'	Stadium: St James Park; Attendance: 0 Referee: Sam Allison

6 October 2020 Group stage	Forest Green Rovers	3–0	West Bromwich Albion U21	Nailsworth
19:00 BST	Stokes 17'; Stevens 19'; Young 29'	Report	Thorndike (yellow card) 37'	Stadium: The New Lawn; Attendance: 0 Referee: John Busby

10 November 2020 Group stage	Forest Green Rovers	0–1	Swindon Town	Nailsworth
19:00 GMT	Covil (yellow card) 49'	Report	Curran (yellow card) 38'; Broadbent 90+3'	Stadium: The New Lawn; Attendance: 0 Referee: Lee Swabey

8 December 2020 Second round	Oxford United	1–1 (4–1 p)	Forest Green Rovers	Oxford
19:45 GMT	Shodipo 64'	Report	Bailey 45+1'	Stadium: Kassam Stadium; Attendance: 1,036; Referee: Craig Hicks
	Penalties
	O'Donkor (penalty scored); Clare (penalty scored); Shodipo (penalty scored); Mousinho (penalty scored)		Collins (penalty missed); Bailey (penalty scored); Godwin-Malife (penalty missed)

== Statistics ==
=== Appearances and goals ===
Last updated 23 May 2021.

No.	Pos	Nat	Player	Total		EFL League Two		EFL Cup		EFL Trophy		FA Cup	
No.	Pos	Nat	Player	Apps	Goals	Apps	Goals	Apps	Goals	Apps	Goals	Apps	Goals
Goalkeepers
1	GK	(England) ENG	Luke McGee	37	0	35	0	1	0	1	0	0	0
24	GK	(Wales) WAL	Lewis Thomas	17	0	13	0	0	0	3	0	1	0
Defenders
2	DF	(England) ENG	Kane Wilson	31	1	27	1	1	0	2	0	1	0
3	DF	(Republic of Ireland) IRL	Dom Bernard	30	0	27	0	0	0	3	0	0	0
5	DF	(England) ENG	Chris Stokes	38	3	35	2	1	0	2	1	0	0
6	DF	(England) ENG	Liam Kitching (transferred out)	18	0	16	0	0	0	1	0	1	0
6	DF	(England) ENG	Baily Cargill	24	2	24	2	0	0	0	0	0	0
15	DF	(England) ENG	Jordan Moore-Taylor	35	2	32	2	1	0	1	0	1	0
16	DF	(England) ENG	Jack Evans	5	0	2	0	0	0	3	0	0	0
22	DF	(England) ENG	Udoka Godwin-Malife	49	0	45	0	1	0	2	0	1	0
25	DF	(England) ENG	Jayden Richardson	36	0	34	0	0	0	2	0	0	0
47	DF	(England) ENG	Luke Hallett	1	0	1	0	0	0	0	0	0	0
Midfielders
4	MF	(England) ENG	Dan Sweeney	28	0	23	0	1	0	3	0	1	0
7	MF	(Northern Ireland) NIR	Carl Winchester (transferred out)	21	2	18	2	1	0	1	0	1	0
7	MF	(England) ENG	Isaac Hutchinson	10	0	10	0	0	0	0	0	0	0
8	MF	(The Gambia) GAM	Ebou Adams	40	3	38	3	1	0	1	0	0	0
11	MF	(Scotland) SCO	Nicky Cadden	39	4	35	4	1	0	2	0	1	0
17	MF	(England) ENG	Odin Bailey	38	3	36	3	0	0	1	0	1	0
20	MF	(England) ENG	Elliott Whitehouse	30	3	27	2	0	0	2	0	1	1
21	MF	(England) ENG	Scott Wagstaff	37	1	35	1	0	0	2	0	0	0
26	MF	(United States) USA	Vaughn Covil	3	0	3	0	0	0	0	0	0	0
27	MF	(England) ENG	Harvey Bunker	2	0	0	0	0	0	2	0	0	0
Forwards
9	FW	(England) ENG	Matty Stevens (out on loan)	16	5	10	2	1	0	4	3	1	0
10	FW	(Wales) WAL	Aaron Collins	50	11	46	11	1	0	2	0	1	0
12	FW	(England) ENG	Taylor Allen	8	0	5	0	0	0	3	0	0	0
14	FW	(Jamaica) JAM	Jamille Matt	40	17	38	17	1	0	1	0	0	0
18	FW	(England) ENG	Jake Young	33	8	30	6	0	0	2	1	1	1
19	FW	(England) ENG	Shawn McCoulsky	4	0	2	0	1	0	1	0	0	0
23	FW	(England) ENG	Josh Davison	22	3	22	3	0	0	0	0	0	0
28	FW	(England) ENG	Josh March	7	0	4	0	0	0	2	0	1	0

=== Top scorers ===
Includes all competitive matches. The list is sorted by squad number when total goals are equal.

Last updated 23 May 2021.

Rank	Position	Nationality	No.	Player	EFL League Two	EFL Cup	EFL Trophy	FA Cup	Total
1	FW	(Jamaica)	14	Jamille Matt	17	0	0	0	17
2	FW	(Wales)	10	Aaron Collins	11	0	0	0	11
3	FW	(England)	18	Jake Young	6	0	1	1	8
4	FW	(England)	9	Matty Stevens	2	0	3	0	5
4	MF	(England)	17	Odin Bailey	4	0	1	0	5
5	MF	(England)	11	Nicky Cadden	4	0	0	0	4
6	DF	(England)	5	Chris Stokes	2	0	1	0	3
6	MF	(The Gambia)	8	Ebou Adams	3	0	0	0	3
6	MF	(England)	20	Elliott Whitehouse	2	0	0	1	3
6	FW	(England)	23	Josh Davison	3	0	0	0	3
7	DF	(England)	6	Baily Cargill	2	0	0	0	2
7	MF	(Northern Ireland)	7	Carl Winchester	2	0	0	0	2
7	DF	(England)	15	Jordan Moore-Taylor	2	0	0	0	2
8	DF	(England)	2	Kane Wilson	1	0	0	0	1
8	MF	(England)	21	Scott Wagstaff	1	0	0	0	1
	Own goals				1	1	0	0	0
	TOTALS				63	1	6	2	72

=== Cleansheets ===
Includes all competitive matches. The list is sorted by squad number when total cleansheets are equal.

Last updated 23 May 2021.

Rank	Position	Nationality	No.	Player	EFL League Two	EFL Cup	EFL Trophy	FA Cup	Total
1
1	GK	(England)	1	Luke McGee	11	0	0	0	11
2
2	GK	(Wales)	24	Lewis Thomas	5	0	1	0	6
TOTALS					16	0	1	0	17

=== Disciplinary record ===
Includes all competitive matches.

Last updated 23 May 2021.

Position	Nationality	Number	Name	League Two		EFL Cup		EFL Trophy		FA Cup		Total	
Position	Nationality	Number	Name	Booked	Sent off (straight red)	Booked	Sent off (straight red)	Booked	Sent off (straight red)	Booked	Sent off (straight red)	Booked	Sent off (straight red)
MF	(The Gambia)	8	Ebou Adams	11	3	1	0	0	0	0	0	12	3
MF	(England)	20	Elliott Whitehouse	3	1	0	0	0	0	0	0	3	1
DF	(England)	6	Liam Kitching	6	0	0	0	0	0	1	0	7	0
FW	(Wales)	10	Aaron Collins	6	0	0	0	0	0	0	0	6	0
DF	(England)	6	Baily Cargill	5	0	0	0	0	0	0	0	5	0
MF	(Northern Ireland)	7	Carl Winchester	5	0	0	0	0	0	0	0	5	0
DF	(England)	2	Kane Wilson	4	0	0	0	0	0	0	0	4	0
DF	(England)	5	Chris Stokes	4	0	0	0	0	0	0	0	4	0
FW	(Jamaica)	14	Jamille Matt	4	0	0	0	0	0	0	0	4	0
MF	(England)	17	Odin Bailey	4	0	0	0	0	0	0	0	4	0
DF	(England)	22	Udoka Godwin-Malife	4	0	0	0	0	0	0	0	4	0
DF	(England)	15	Jordan Moore-Taylor	3	0	0	0	0	0	0	0	3	0
MF	(England)	21	Scott Wagstaff	2	0	0	0	1	0	0	0	3	0
MF	(England)	4	Dan Sweeney	2	0	0	0	0	0	0	0	2	0
MF	(Scotland)	11	Nicky Cadden	2	0	0	0	0	0	0	0	2	0
DF	(Republic of Ireland)	3	Dom Bernard	1	0	0	0	0	0	0	0	1	0
FW	(England)	12	Taylor Allen	0	0	0	0	1	0	0	0	1	0
DF	(England)	16	Jack Evans	0	0	0	0	1	0	0	0	1	0
FW	(England)	23	Josh Davison	1	0	0	0	0	0	0	0	1	0
GK	(Wales)	24	Lewis Thomas	1	0	0	0	0	0	0	0	1	0
DF	(England)	25	Jayden Richardson	1	0	0	0	0	0	0	0	1	0
MF	(United States)	26	Vaughn Covil	0	0	0	0	1	0	0	0	1	0
			TOTALS	69	4	1	0	4	0	1	0	75	4
