= 2017–18 Lincoln City F.C. season =

Lincoln City
2017–18 season
- Chairman: Bob Dorrian
- Manager: Danny Cowley
- Stadium: Sincil Bank, Lincoln
- League Two: 7th
- Play-offs: Semi-final (eliminated by Exeter City)
- FA Cup: First round (eliminated by AFC Wimbledon)
- EFL Cup: First round (eliminated by Rotherham United)
- EFL Trophy: Winners
- Top goalscorer: League: Matt Green (14); All: Matt Green (18)
- Highest home attendance: 10,004 (vs Yeovil Town; EFL League Two)
- Average home league attendance: 8,782

The 2017–18 season was Lincoln City's 134th season in their history and their first season back in League Two following promotion from the 2016–17 National League. Along with League Two, the club also participated in the FA Cup, EFL Cup and EFL Trophy.

The season covers the period from 1 July 2017 to 30 June 2018.

== Transfers ==
=== Transfers in ===
| Date from | Position | Nationality | Name | From | Fee | Ref. |
|---|---|---|---|---|---|---|
| 1 July 2017 | CF | ENG | Matt Green | Mansfield Town | Free | |
| 1 July 2017 | CM | ENG | Billy Knott | Gillingham | Free | |
| 1 July 2017 | CF | ENG | Ollie Palmer | Leyton Orient | Free | |
| 1 July 2017 | GK | ENG | Josh Vickers | Swansea City | Free | |
| 20 July 2017 | RM | ENG | Harry Anderson | Peterborough United | Undisclosed | |
| 20 July 2017 | CB | ENG | Michael Bostwick | Peterborough United | Undisclosed | |
| 3 August 2017 | RB | WAL | Neal Eardley | Northampton Town | Free | |
| 24 October 2017 | LW | ENG | Cameron Stewart | Free agent | —N/a | |
| 11 January 2018 | CM | ENG | Lee Frecklington | Rotherham United | Undisclosed | |
| 12 January 2018 | CB | WAL | James Wilson | Sheffield United | Free | |
| 31 January 2018 | WM | ENG | Tom Pett | Stevenage F.C. | Undisclosed | |

=== Transfers out ===
| Date from | Position | Nationality | Name | To | Fee | Ref. |
|---|---|---|---|---|---|---|
| 1 July 2017 | CF | ENG | Jenk Acar | Free agent | Released | |
| 1 July 2017 | CM | ENG | Keegan Everington | Grantham Town | Released | (Note: Kegan Everington joined Grantham Town following his release.) |
| 1 July 2017 | RM | ENG | Terry Hawkridge | Notts County | Free | |
| 1 July 2017 | RM | ENG | Elliot Hodge | Notts County | Released | (Note: Elliot Hodge joined Notts County following his release.) |
| 1 July 2017 | CM | ENG | Taylor Miles | Hemel Hempstead Town | Released | (Note: Taylor Miles joined Hemel Hempstead Town following his release.) |
| 1 July 2017 | LW | ENG | Alex Simmons | Gainsborough Trinity | Released | (Note: Alex Simmons joined Gainsborough Trinity following his release.) |
| 1 July 2017 | MF | ENG | Andrew Wright | Free agent | Released | |
| 1 July 2017 | MF | IRL | Alan Power | Kilmarnock | Free | |
| 1 July 2017 | MF | ENG | Jack Muldoon | AFC Fylde | Free | |
| 1 July 2017 | FW | ENG | Adam Marriott | Royston Town | Released | |
| 18 August 2017 | CB | ENG | Sean Raggett | Norwich City | Undisclosed | |
| 31 January 2018 | CB | ENG | Callum Howe | Port Vale | Undisclosed | |

=== Loans in ===
| Start date | Position | Nationality | Name | From | End date | Ref. |
|---|---|---|---|---|---|---|
| 1 July 2017 | LW | ENG | Josh Ginnelly | Burnley | 12 January 2018 | |
| 10 July 2017 | RW | ENG | Jordan Maguire-Drew | Brighton & Hove Albion | 2 January 2018 | |
| 1 August 2017 | CB | ENG | Robert Dickie | Reading | 1 January 2018 | |
| 18 August 2017 | CB | ENG | Sean Raggett | Norwich City | 2 January 2018 | |
| 2 January 2018 | WM | ENG | Danny Rowe | Ipswich Town | 30 June 2018 | |
| 12 January 2018 | WM | ENG | Jordan Williams | Rochdale | 30 June 2018 | |
| 31 January 2018 | CB | ENG | Scott Wharton | Blackburn Rovers | 30 June 2018 | |
| 31 January 2018 | GK | ENG | Ryan Allsop | AFC Bournemouth | 30 June 2018 | |

=== Loans out ===
| Start date | Position | Nationality | Name | From | End date | Ref. |
|---|---|---|---|---|---|---|
| 3 July 2017 | GK | ENG | Richard Walton | Gainsborough Trinity | 6 October 2017 | (Note: On 6 October 2017, Richard Walton was recalled from his loan at Gainsborough Trinity to link-up with Cleethorpes Town on an initial one-month loan.) |
| 15 August 2017 | CB | ENG | Callum Howe | Eastleigh | 15 January 2018 | |
| 6 October 2017 | GK | ENG | Richard Walton | Cleethorpes Town | 1 January 2018 | (Note: On 8 November, Richard Walton's loan at Cleethorpes Town was extended for a further two months.) |

== Competitions ==
=== Friendlies ===
As of 28 June 2017, Lincoln City have announced five pre-season friendlies against Walsall, Oxford United, Gainsborough Trinity. Lincoln United and Peterborough United.

The originally planned friendly against Oxford United was later cancelled.

| 8 July 2017 | Lincoln United | 0–4 | Lincoln City | Lincoln |
| 15:00 BST | | Report | Green x2' Rowe; Arnold | Stadium: Ashby Avenue |

| 12 July 2017 | Benfica B | 3–1 | Lincoln City | Santo António, Portugal |
| 18:00 WEST | Joao Felix x3' | Report | Maguire-Drew | Stadium: Sports Complex Vila Real |

| 15 July 2017 Lincolnshire Senior Cup | Gainsborough Trinity | 4–1 | Lincoln City | Gainsborough |
| 15:00 BST | Simmons 3', 77'; Worsfold 33' (pen.); Wells 89' | Report | Watkins 72' | Stadium: The Northolme |

| 22 July 2017 | Lincoln City | 2–3 | Peterborough United | Lincoln |
| 13:00 BST | Green 23'; Ginnelly 71' | Report | Edwards 3'; Marriott 14', 84' | Stadium: Sincil Bank |

| 25 July 2017 | Lincoln City | 4–3 | Nottingham Forest U23s | Lincoln |
| 19:00 BST | Whitehouse 32'; Green 80'; Bostwick 86'; Arnold 90' | Report | Walker 9', 48'; Licá 12' | Stadium: Sincil Bank; Attendance: 1,297 |

| 29 July 2017 | Lincoln City | 2–1 | Walsall | Lincoln |
| 15:00 BST | Arnold 72'; Raggett 79' | Report | Jackson 49' | Stadium: Sincil Bank; Attendance: 2,376 |

=== League Two ===
==== League table ====
| Pos | Team | Pld | W | D | L | GF | GA | GD | Pts | Promotion, qualification or relegation |
|---|---|---|---|---|---|---|---|---|---|---|
| 5 | Notts County | 46 | 21 | 14 | 11 | 71 | 48 | +23 | 77 | Qualification for League Two play-offs (Note: Four teams play for one spot and promotion to EFL League One.) |
| 6 | Coventry City (O, P) | 46 | 22 | 9 | 15 | 64 | 47 | +17 | 75 | Qualification for League Two play-offs |
| 7 | Lincoln City | 46 | 20 | 15 | 11 | 64 | 48 | +16 | 75 | Qualification for League Two play-offs |
| 8 | Mansfield Town | 46 | 18 | 18 | 10 | 67 | 52 | +15 | 72 | |
| 9 | Swindon Town | 46 | 20 | 8 | 18 | 67 | 65 | +2 | 68 | |

Source: BBC Sport
Rules for classification: 1) Points; 2) Goal difference; 3) Number of goals scored
(O) Play-off winners; (P) Promoted

==== Results summary ====
| Overall | | | | | | | | Home | | | | | | Away | | | | | |
| Pld | W | D | L | GF | GA | GD | Pts | W | D | L | GF | GA | GD | W | D | L | GF | GA | GD |
|---|---|---|---|---|---|---|---|---|---|---|---|---|---|---|---|---|---|---|---|
| 46 | 20 | 15 | 11 | 64 | 48 | +16 | 75 | 12 | 8 | 3 | 38 | 23 | +15 | 8 | 7 | 8 | 26 | 25 | +1 |

Last updated: 5 May 2018.

==== Results by matchday ====
| Matchday | 1 | 2 | 3 | 4 | 5 | 6 | 7 | 8 | 9 | 10 | 11 | 12 | 13 | 14 | 15 | 16 | 17 | 18 | 19 | 20 | 21 | 22 | 23 | 24 | 25 | 26 | 27 | 28 | 29 | 30 | 31 | 32 | 33 | 34 | 35 | 36 | 37 | 38 | 39 | 40 | 41 | 42 | 43 | 44 | 45 |
|---|---|---|---|---|---|---|---|---|---|---|---|---|---|---|---|---|---|---|---|---|---|---|---|---|---|---|---|---|---|---|---|---|---|---|---|---|---|---|---|---|---|---|---|---|---|
| Ground | A | H | A | H | H | A | A | H | A | H | A | H | H | A | A | H | A | H | A | H | A | H | A | H | H | A | H | A | H | H | A | H | A | H | A | A | H | A | H | A | A | H | H | A | H |
| Result | D | D | L | W | D | W | W | L | L | W | D | W | D | W | L | D | W | L | L | W | W | W | D | W | W | L | D | D | W | D | D | W | L | L | D | W | W | D | W | W | L | D | W | W | D |
| Position | 14 | 19 | 22 | 13 | 14 | 11 | 5 | 10 | 12 | 12 | 11 | 10 | 10 | 9 | 10 | 9 | 8 | 10 | 11 | 7 | 6 | 6 | 6 | 3 | 3 | 6 | 6 | 8 | 8 | 9 | 10 | 7 | 7 | 8 | 9 | 7 | 7 | 8 | 7 | 6 | 8 | 6 | 6 | 6 | 7 |

Updated to match(es) played on 5 May 2018. Source: Statto.com
A = Away; H = Home; W = Win; D = Draw; L = Loss

==== Matches ====
On 21 June 2017, the league fixtures were announced.

| 5 August 2017 1 | Wycombe Wanderers | 2–2 | Lincoln City | High Wycombe |
| 15:00 BST | O'Nien 37'; Jacobson 40' | Report | Green 31'; Ginnelly 48' | Stadium: Adams Park; Attendance: 5,538; Referee: Graham Horwood |

| 12 August 2017 2 | Lincoln City | 1–1 | Morecambe | Lincoln |
| 15:00 BST | Green 70' | Report | Wildig 53' | Stadium: Sincil Bank; Attendance: 8,060; Referee: Gavin Ward |

| 19 August 2017 3 | Exeter City | 1–0 | Lincoln City | Exeter |
| 15:00 BST | Reid 42' | Report | | Stadium: St James' Park; Attendance: 3,980; Referee: Craig Hicks |

| 26 August 2017 4 | Lincoln City | 4–1 | Carlisle United | Lincoln |
| 15:00 BST | Woodyard 31', 62'; Rhead 67' (pen.); Knott 87' | Report | Lambe 75' | Stadium: Sincil Bank; Attendance: 8,345; Referee: Eddie Ilderton |

| 2 September 2017 5 | Lincoln City | 0–0 | Luton Town | Lincoln |
| 15:00 BST | | Report | | Stadium: Sincil Bank; Attendance: 9,332; Referee: Tom Nield |

| 9 September 2017 6 | Stevenage | 1–2 | Lincoln City | Stevenage |
| 15:00 BST | Godden 26' | Report | Raggett 58'; Palmer 75' (pen.) | Stadium: Broadhall Way; Attendance: 3,427; Referee: Anthony Backhouse |

| 12 September 2017 7 | Forest Green Rovers | 0–1 | Lincoln City | Nailsworth |
| 19:45 BST | | Report | Anderson 65' | Stadium: The New Lawn; Attendance: 1,887; Referee: Lee Swabey |

| 16 September 2017 8 | Lincoln City | 0–1 | Mansfield Town | Lincoln |
| 13:00 BST | | Report | Rose 61' | Stadium: Sincil Bank; Attendance: 9,563; Referee: Robert Jones |

| 23 September 2017 9 | Notts County | 4–1 | Lincoln City | Nottingham |
| 15:00 BST | Stead 39'; Tootle 55'; Grant 71'; Hawkridge 88' | Report | Anderson 47' | Stadium: Meadow Lane; Attendance: 11,672; Referee: Seb Stockbridge |

| 26 September 2017 10 | Lincoln City | 2–1 | Barnet | Lincoln |
| 19:45 BST | Palmer 7'; Anderson 42' | Report | Coulthirst 62' | Stadium: Sincil Bank; Attendance: 7,320; Referee: Trevor Kettle |

| 30 September 2017 11 | Grimsby Town | 0–0 | Lincoln City | Cleethorpes |
| 13:00 BST | | Report | | Stadium: Blundell Park; Attendance: 7,669; Referee: Carl Boyeson |

| 7 October 2017 12 | Lincoln City | 2–1 | Chesterfield | Lincoln |
| 15:00 BST | Bostwick 17'; Kellett 25' (o.g.) | Report | Dennis 82' (pen.) | Stadium: Sincil Bank; Attendance: 9,485; Referee: John Brooks |

| 14 October 2017 13 | Lincoln City | 0–0 | Cambridge United | Lincoln |
| 15:00 BST | | Report | | Stadium: Sincil Bank; Attendance: 8,803; Referee: Kevin Johnson |

| 17 October 2017 14 | Swindon Town | 0–1 | Lincoln City | Swindon |
| 19:45 BST | | Report | Raggett 83' | Stadium: County Ground; Attendance: 5,864; Referee: Scott Oldham |

| 21 October 2017 15 | Cheltenham Town | 1–0 | Lincoln City | Cheltenham |
| 15:00 BST | Wright 30' | Report | | Stadium: Whaddon Road; Attendance: 3,312; Referee: Chris Sarginson |

| 28 October 2017 16 | Lincoln City | 0–0 | Crawley Town | Lincoln |
| 15:00 BST | | Report | | Stadium: Sincil Bank; Attendance: 8,038; Referee: Darren Handley |

| 11 November 2017 17 | Crewe Alexandra | 1–4 | Lincoln City | Crewe |
| 15:00 GMT | Raynes 8' | Report | Anderson 50', 67'; Raynes 70' (o.g.); Whitehouse 90+4' | Stadium: Gresty Road; Attendance: 4,723; Referee: Craig Hicks |

| 18 November 2017 18 | Lincoln City | 1–2 | Coventry City | Lincoln |
| 15:00 GMT | Rhead 28' | Report | Jones 61'; Nazon 70' | Stadium: Sincil Bank; Attendance: 9,581; Referee: Ross Joyce |

| 21 November 2017 19 | Colchester United | 1–0 | Lincoln City | Colchester |
| 19:45 GMT | Szmodics 3' | Report | | Stadium: Colchester Community Stadium; Attendance: 3,102; Referee: Graham Horwood |

| 25 November 2017 20 | Lincoln City | 3–1 | Port Vale | Lincoln |
| 15:00 BST | Green 10'; Bostwick 53'; Waterfall 69' | Report | Pugh 45+1' | Stadium: Sincil Bank; Attendance: 7,562; Referee: Andy Haines |

| 9 December 2017 21 | Yeovil Town | 0–2 | Lincoln City | Yeovil |
| 15:00 GMT | | Report | Green 50'; Rhead 69' | Stadium: Huish Park; Attendance: 2,472; Referee: Lee Collins |

| 16 December 2017 22 | Lincoln City | 2–0 | Accrington Stanley | Lincoln |
| 15:00 GMT | Green 45' (pen.); Rhead 56' | Report | | Stadium: Sincil Bank; Attendance: 7,696; Referee: Seb Stockbridge |

| 23 December 2017 23 | Newport County | 0–0 | Lincoln City | Newport |
| 15:00 GMT | | Report | | Stadium: Rodney Parade; Attendance: 3,514; Referee: Brett Huxtable |

| 26 December 2017 24 | Lincoln City | 3–0 | Stevenage | Lincoln |
| 15:00 GMT | Anderson 34'; Green 63'; Ginnelly 80' | Report | | Stadium: Sincil Bank; Attendance: 9,268; Referee: Carl Boyeson |

| 30 December 2017 25 | Lincoln City | 2–1 | Forest Green Rovers | Lincoln |
| 15:00 GMT | Rhead 8', 57' | Report | Doidge 24' | Stadium: Sincil Bank; Attendance: 8,964; Referee: Martin Coy |

| 1 January 2018 26 | Luton Town | 4–2 | Lincoln City | Luton |
| 15:00 | Collins 32'; Justin 43'; Hylton 72'; Cornick 82' | Report | Bostwick 6'; Green 34' | Stadium: Kenilworth Road; Attendance: 9,659; Referee: Nick Kinseley |

| 13 January 2018 27 | Lincoln City | 2–2 | Notts County | Lincoln |
| 15:00 | Frecklington 37'; Green 67' | Report | Stead 35'; Grant 76' | Stadium: Sincil Bank; Attendance: 9,603; Referee: Ross Joyce |

| 20 January 2018 28 | Barnet | 1–1 | Lincoln City | London |
| 15:00 | Akinde 12' | Report | Wilson 47' | Stadium: The Hive Stadium; Attendance: 3,161; Referee: Tom Nield |

| 30 January 2018 29 | Lincoln City | 3–1 | Newport County | Lincoln |
| 19:45 GMT | Rhead 13'; Green 51'; Palmer 73' | Report | Amond 32' | Stadium: Sincil Bank; Attendance: 7,567; Referee: Scott Oldham |

| 3 February 2018 30 | Lincoln City | 2–2 | Swindon Town | Lincoln |
| | Frecklington 23' (pen.); Bostwick 90+3' | Report | Richards 35'; Banks 38' | Stadium: Sincil Bank; Attendance: 8,909; Referee: Anthony Coggins |

| 10 February 2018 31 | Cambridge United | 0–0 | Lincoln City | Cambridge |
| 15:00 GMT | | Report | | Stadium: Abbey Stadium; Attendance: 5,775; Referee: Darren England |

| 13 February 2018 32 | Lincoln City | 1–0 | Cheltenham Town | Lincoln |
| 19:45 GMT | Eardley 45+2' | Report | | Stadium: Sincil Bank; Attendance: 7,891; Referee: Seb Stockridge |

| 17 February 2018 33 | Crawley Town | 3–1 | Lincoln City | Crawley |
| 15:00 GMT | Smith 15'; Payne 68' (pen.); Connolly 72' | Report | Green 52' | Stadium: Broadfield Stadium; Attendance: 2,809; Referee: Trevor Kettle |

| 24 February 2018 34 | Lincoln City | 1–4 | Crewe Alexandra | Lincoln |
| 15:00 GMT | Bostwick 35' | Report | Pickering 45'; Bowery 48', 68'; Green 54' | Stadium: Sincil Bank; Attendance: 8,272; Referee: Carl Boyeson |

| 6 March 2018 35 | Mansfield Town | 1–1 | Lincoln City | Mansfield |
| 19:45 GMT | Byrom 49' | Report | Palmer 90' | Stadium: Field Mill; Attendance: 6,091; Referee: Graham Salisbury |

| 10 March 2018 36 | Chesterfield | 1–3 | Lincoln City | Chesterfield |
| 15:00 GMT | Whitmore 34' | Report | Bostwick 45'; Wharton 59'; Palmer 85' | Stadium: Proact Stadium; Attendance: 6,395; Referee: David Webb |

| 17 March 2018 37 | Lincoln City | 3–1 | Grimsby Town | Lincoln |
| 13:00 GMT | Frecklington 31'; Green 34'; Wharton 39' | Report | Davies 45+2' (pen.) | Stadium: Sincil Bank; Attendance: 9,774; Referee: David Coote |

| 24 March 2018 38 | Morecambe | 0–0 | Lincoln City | Morecambe |
| 15:00 GMT | | Report | | Stadium: Globe Arena; Attendance: 1,883; Referee: Eddie Ilderton |

| 30 March 2018 39 | Lincoln City | 3–2 | Exeter City | Lincoln |
| 15:00 GMT | Rowe 60'; Green 62'; Palmer 86' | Report | Stockley 10'; Taylor 78' | Stadium: Sincil Bank; Attendance: 9,785; Referee: Tom Nield |

| 2 April 2018 40 | Carlisle United | 0–1 | Lincoln City | Carlisle |
| | | Report | Green 43' | Stadium: Brunton Park; Attendance: 5,068; Referee: Robert Lewis |

| 14 April 2018 41 | Port Vale | 1–0 | Lincoln City | Burslem |
| 15:00 BST | Kay 63' | Report | | Stadium: Vale Park; Attendance: 5,580; Referee: John Busby |

| 17 April 2018 42 | Lincoln City | 0–0 | Wycombe Wanderers | Lincoln |
| 19:45 BST | | Report | Tyson (yellow card) 20'; El-Abd (yellow card) 47'; McGinley (yellow card) 76'; Bean (yellow card) 76' | Stadium: Sincil Bank; Attendance: 8,948; Referee: John Brooks |

| 21 April 2018 43 | Lincoln City | 2–1 | Colchester United | Lincoln |
| 15:00 BST | Whitehouse 55' (pen.); Waterfall 90+4'; Bostwick (red card) 83' | Report | Senior 60' | Stadium: Sincil Bank; Attendance: 9,211; Referee: Darren Handley |

| 24 April 2018 44 | Coventry City | 2–4 | Lincoln City | Coventry |
| 19:45 BST | Bayliss 16'; Shipley 39' | Report | Rhead 1'; Palmer 38', 44'; Frecklington 67' | Stadium: Ricoh Arena; Attendance: 13,115; Referee: Mike Jones |

| 28 April 2018 45 | Accrington Stanley | 1–0 | Lincoln City | Accrington |
| 15:00 BST | Clark 35' | Report | | Stadium: Crown Ground; Attendance: 4,753; Referee: Michael Salisbury |

| 5 May 2018 46 | Lincoln City | 1–1 | Yeovil Town | Lincoln |
| 15:00 BST | Pett 77' | Report | Green 10' | Stadium: Sincil Bank; Attendance: 10,004; Referee: Eddie Ilderton |

==== League Two play-offs ====
| 11 May 2018 Semi final (1st leg) | Lincoln City | 0–0 | Exeter City | Lincoln |
| 15:00 BST | Palmer (yellow card) 90' | Report | | Stadium: Sincil Bank; Attendance: 9,509; Referee: Ben Toner |

| 17 May 2018 Semi final (2nd leg) | Exeter City | 3–1 (3–1 agg.) | Lincoln City | Exeter |
| 19:45 BST | Stockley 27', (yellow card) 89'; Boateng 47'; Harley 69'; Moxey (yellow card) 90' | Report | Eardley (yellow card) 18'; Green 78'; Bostwick (yellow card) 83' | Stadium: St James' Park; Attendance: 5,645; Referee: Darren England |

=== FA Cup ===
| 4 November 2017 First round | AFC Wimbledon | 1–0 | Lincoln City | Norbiton |
| 15:00 GMT | Taylor 7' | Report | | Stadium: Kingsmeadow; Attendance: 3,394; Referee: Andy Woolmer |

=== EFL Cup ===
On 16 June 2017, Lincoln City were drawn away to Rotherham United in the first round.

| 8 August 2017 First round | Rotherham United | 2–1 | Lincoln City | Rotherham |
| 19:45 BST | Proctor 39'; Forde 78' | Report | Knott 64' | Stadium: AESSEAL New York Stadium; Attendance: 5,489; Referee: Seb Stockbridge |

=== EFL Trophy ===
On 12 July 2017, Lincoln City were drawn in Northern Group G alongside Everton U23s, Mansfield Town and Notts County. As group winners, Lincoln City were handed a home tie against Accrington Stanley in the second round.· An away tie against Rochdale was announced for the third round.

| Pos | Lge | Team | Pld | W | PW | PL | L | GF | GA | GD | Pts | Qualification |
|---|---|---|---|---|---|---|---|---|---|---|---|---|
| 1 | L2 | Lincoln City (Q) | 3 | 3 | 0 | 0 | 0 | 7 | 3 | +4 | 9 | Round 2 |
| 2 | L2 | Mansfield Town (Q) | 3 | 2 | 0 | 0 | 1 | 4 | 4 | 0 | 6 | Round 2 |
| 3 | L2 | Notts County (E) | 3 | 1 | 0 | 0 | 2 | 4 | 5 | −1 | 3 | |
| 4 | ACA | Everton U21 (E) | 3 | 0 | 0 | 0 | 3 | 2 | 5 | −3 | 0 | |

Updated to match(es) played on 7 November 2017. Source: EFL.com
(E) Eliminated; (Q) Qualified to the phase indicated

| 29 August 2017 Group Game 1 | Mansfield Town | 1–3 | Lincoln City | Mansfield |
| 19:45 BST | Potter 6'; MacDonald (yellow card) 38'; Digby (yellow card) 42' | Report | Whitehouse 40'; Palmer 79'; Eardley (yellow card) 85'; Waterfall (yellow card) 90'; Green 90+5' | Stadium: Field Mill; Attendance: 2,495 |

| 24 October 2017 Group Game 2 | Lincoln City | 2–1 | Everton U21s | Lincoln |
| 19:45 BST | Maguire-Drew 3', 23'; Farman (yellow card) 82' | Report | Baxter (yellow card) 51'; Adeniran 81'; Lavery (yellow card) 82' | Stadium: Sincil Bank; Attendance: 3,713; Referee: Graham Salisbury |

| 7 November 2017 Group Game 3 | Lincoln City | 2–1 | Notts County | Lincoln |
| 19:45 GMT | Bird 37' (o.g.); Ginnelly 86' | Report | Forte 27'; Hollis (yellow card) 52'; Smith (yellow card) 87' | Stadium: Sincil Bank; Attendance: 3,026; Referee: Tom Nield |

| 5 December 2017 Second round | Lincoln City | 3–2 | Accrington Stanley | Lincoln |
| 19:45 GMT | Raggett (yellow card) 25' (goal) 61'; Palmer 37'; Green 45+1'; Woodyard (yellow card) 75'; Long (yellow card) 85' | Report | Wilks 7'; Thorniley (yellow card) 32'; Farman 42' (o.g.); McConville (yellow card) 54'; Hughes (yellow card) 62' | Stadium: Sincil Bank; Attendance: 3,026; Referee: Christopher Sarginson |

| 9 January 2018 Third round | Rochdale | 0–1 | Lincoln City | Spotland |
| 19:45 GMT | Cannon (yellow card) 79' | Report | Green (yellow card) 15'; Woodyard (yellow card) 19'; Palmer 88' | Stadium: Spotland Stadium; Attendance: 1,171; Referee: (England) Ben Toner |

| 23 January 2018 Fourth round | Lincoln City | 4–2 | Peterborough United | Lincoln |
| 19:45 GMT | | | | Stadium: Sincil Bank; Attendance: 6,663 |

| 6 February 2018 Semi-finals | Lincoln City | 1–1 (4–2 p) | Chelsea U21 | Lincoln |
| 19:45 GMT | Waterfall 72' | Report | Chalobah (yellow card) 27'; Redan 78' | Stadium: Sincil Bank; Attendance: 9,444; Referee: David Webb |
| | Penalties |
| | Habergham (penalty missed); Whitehouse (penalty scored); Palmer (penalty scored); Green (penalty scored); Frecklington (penalty scored) | | Hazard (penalty scored); Ampadu (penalty missed); Maddox (penalty missed); St Clair (penalty scored) |

| 8 April 2018 Final | Lincoln City | 1–0 | Shrewsbury Town | London |
| 15:00 BST | Whitehouse 16' | Report | | Stadium: Wembley Stadium; Attendance: 41,261; Referee: Gavin Ward |
