= Elliott Whitehouse =

English footballer (born 1993)

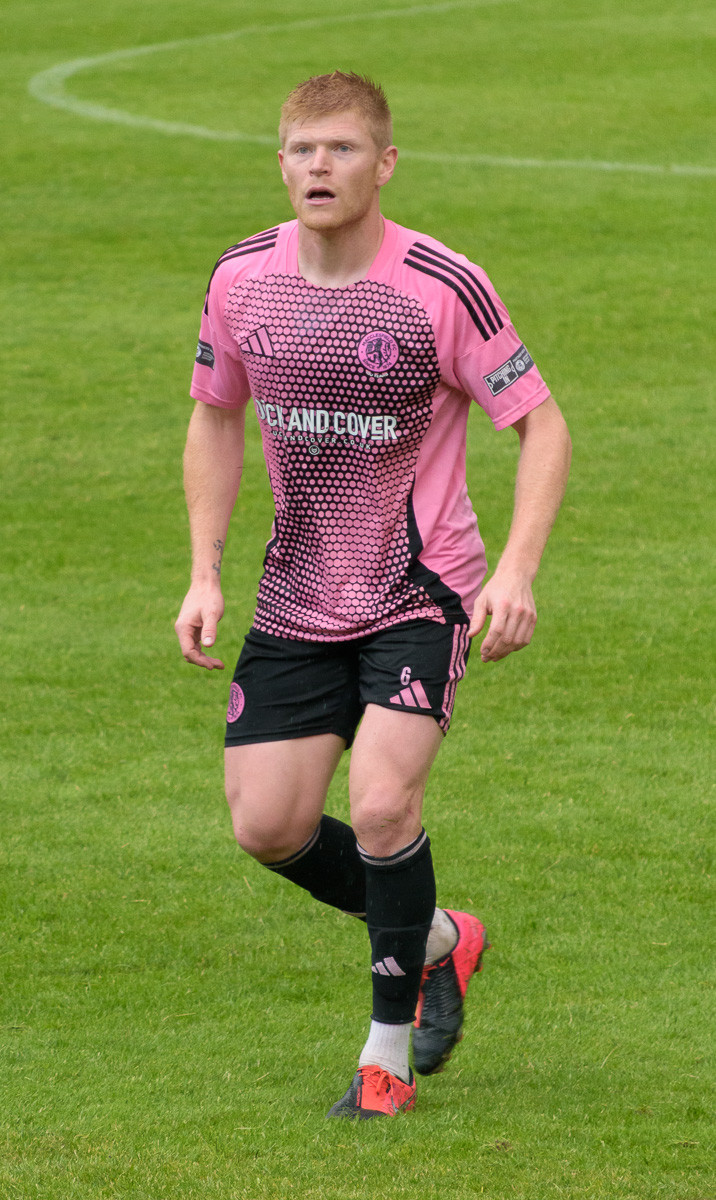
- Whitehouse playing for Macclesfield in 2025

Personal information
- Full name: Elliott Mark Whitehouse
- Date of birth: 27 October 1993 (age 33)
- Place of birth: Worksop, England
- Height: 5 ft 11 in (1.80 m)
- Position: Midfielder

Team information
- Current team: Peterborough Sports (on loan from Macclesfield)

Youth career
- –2013: Sheffield United

Senior career*
Years	Team	Apps	(Gls)
2013–2014	Sheffield United	3	(0)
2013–2014	→ York City (loan)	15	(0)
2014	→ Alfreton Town (loan)	4	(0)
2014–2015	Notts County	7	(1)
2015	→ Nuneaton Town (loan)	5	(0)
2015	FC Halifax Town	4	(0)
2015–2016	Nuneaton Town	39	(19)
2016–2018	Lincoln City	60	(6)
2018–2020	Grimsby Town	33	(3)
2020–2022	Forest Green Rovers	27	(2)
2022–2023	Scunthorpe United	19	(1)
2022–2023	→ Spennymoor Town (loan)	3	(0)
2023	→ Chester (loan)	7	(3)
2023–2024	Chester	40	(9)
2024–	Macclesfield	6	(0)
2025	→ Matlock Town (loan)	11	(1)
2025–	→ Peterborough Sports (loan)	0	(0)

International career
2016	England C	2	(1)
- * Club domestic league appearances and goals as of 17:19, 18 February 2025 (UTC)

Elliott Mark Whitehouse (born 27 October 1993) is an English professional footballer who plays as a midfielder for Peterborough Sports on loan from National League North club Macclesfield.

Whitehouse is a product of Sheffield United's academy and had loan spells with York City and Alfreton Town before being released in 2014. He joined Notts County and after a loan spell with Nuneaton Town was released in 2015. He had a short spell with FC Halifax Town before joining Nuneaton Town permanently. In 2016, Whitehouse joined Lincoln City, helping them to promotion to League Two and scoring the only goal in the 2018 EFL Trophy Final. He moved on to Grimsby Town and Forest Green Rovers, spending two season with each club.

== Early life ==
Whitehouse was born in Worksop, Nottinghamshire.

== Club career ==
=== Sheffield United ===
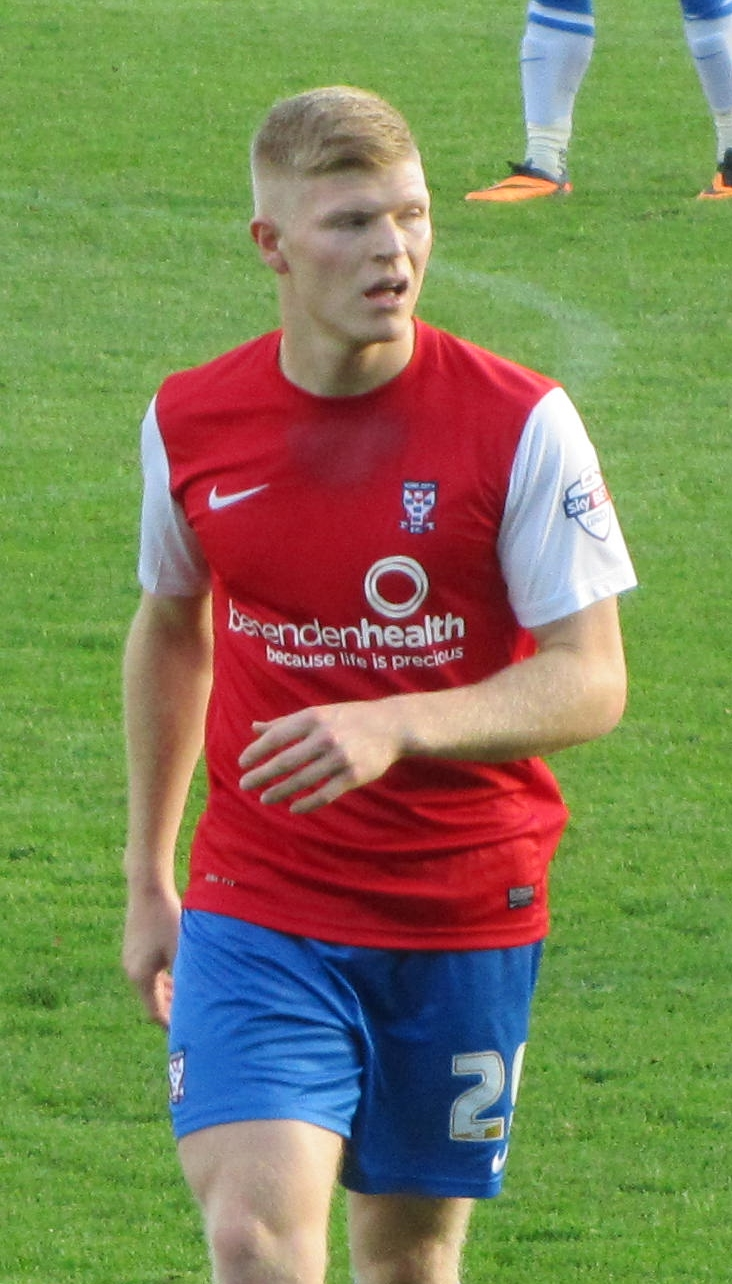
Whitehouse playing for York City in 2013

Whitehouse captained the Sheffield United youth team that reached the final of the FA Youth Cup in the 2010–11 season, only to lose to Manchester United. Top scorer for United's youth and reserve teams in 2011–12, with a total of 17 goals, Whitehouse made his first-team debut on 1 January 2013 in a 2–2 away draw against Doncaster Rovers. Having made five appearances during 2012–13, Whitehouse signed a new contract with United in June 2013.

On 12 September 2013, Whitehouse joined League Two club York City on an initial one-month youth loan. He made his debut two days later in a 2–1 home defeat to Mansfield Town. On 11 October 2013, his loan was extended until 5 January 2014, having made five appearances for York. York opted against extending his loan when it expired, and he finished his spell at the club with 18 appearances. On 22 March 2014, Whitehouse joined Conference Premier club Alfreton Town on loan until the end of 2013–14, his debut coming two days later as a 64th-minute substitute in a 2–0 away defeat to FC Halifax Town. Whitehouse made four appearances for Alfreton before returning to Sheffield United at the end of the season, only to be released when his contract expired.

=== Notts County ===
On 6 August 2014, Whitehouse signed for League One club Notts County on a one-year contract, after impressing on trial by scoring three goals in pre-season. He joined Conference Premier club Nuneaton Town on 31 January 2015 on a one-month loan and debuted the following day in a 1–0 defeat away to Forest Green Rovers. He made five appearances for Nuneaton, and after returning to County scored his first goal for the club on 21 March 2015 in a 4–1 away defeat to Milton Keynes Dons. Having made eight appearances and scored one goal for County in 2014–15, he was released by the club in May 2015.

=== FC Halifax Town and Nuneaton Town ===
Whitehouse signed for National League club FC Halifax Town on 28 May 2015. He made his debut in a 3–1 away defeat to Boreham Wood on 8 August 2015. He had made four appearances for Halifax when he signed for National League North club Nuneaton Town for an undisclosed fee on 4 September 2015.

=== Lincoln City ===
Whitehouse signed for National League club Lincoln City on 20 October 2016 for an undisclosed fee. He finished 2016–17 with 34 appearances and 6 goals as Lincoln were promoted to League Two as National League champions. Whitehouse scored the only goal as Lincoln beat Shrewsbury Town 1–0 at Wembley Stadium on 8 April in the 2018 EFL Trophy Final, with a close-range shot in the 16th minute.

=== Grimsby Town ===
Whitehouse was offered new contract by Lincoln at the end of the 2017–18 season but instead signed for their local rivals and fellow League Two club Grimsby Town on 15 June 2018 on a two-year contract. Whitehouse suffered a ruptured anterior cruciate ligament injury during pre-season training in July 2018, meaning he would miss the full 2018–19 season.

=== Forest Green Rovers ===
On 10 August 2020, Whitehouse signed for Forest Green Rovers on a two-year deal. Following Forest Green's promotion to League One as champions during the 2021–22 season, Whitehouse was among seven players released at the end of the season.

=== Scunthorpe United ===
On 2 June 2022, Whitehouse joined newly-relegated National League side Scunthorpe United on trial and played in a 3-2 pre-season defeat against Middlesbrough. On 7 July he signed a one-year contract.

On 2 December 2022, Whitehouse joined National League North side Spennymoor Town on a one-month loan. On 23 March 2023, he joined Chester on loan until the end of the season. Following Scunthorpe's relegation, Whitehouse was released at the end of the 2022–23 season.

=== Chester ===
Following his successful loan spell, Whitehouse returned to Chester on a permanent one-year deal in June 2023.

=== Macclesfield ===
On 27 May 2024, Whitehouse joined Northern Premier League Premier Division club Macclesfield.

In February 2025, he joined Matlock Town on loan for the remainder of the season.

On 19 August 2025, Whitehouse joined fellow National League North club Peterborough Sports on loan until the end of January 2026.

== International career ==
Whitehouse made his debut for the England national C team on 5 June 2016 in a 4–3 home defeat to Slovakia under-21s in the 2015–17 International Challenge Trophy. He scored his first goal on 16 November 2016, with a seventh-minute header in a 2–1 away win over Estonia under-23s, a result that meant England reached the International Challenge Trophy final as group runners-up.

== Career statistics ==
As of end of 2024–25 season

Appearances and goals by club, season and competition
Club	Season	League			FA Cup		League Cup		Other		Total	
Club	Season	Division	Apps	Goals	Apps	Goals	Apps	Goals	Apps	Goals	Apps	Goals
Sheffield United	2012–13	League One	3	0	1	0	0	0	1 (Note: Appearance(s) in League One play-offs)	0	5	0
Sheffield United	2013–14	League One	0	0	—		0	0	0	0	0	0
Sheffield United	Total		3	0	1	0	0	0	1	0	5	0
York City (loan)	2013–14	League Two	15	0	2	0	0	0	1 (Note: Appearance(s) in Football League Trophy)	0	18	0
Alfreton Town (loan)	2013–14	Conference Premier	4	0	—		—		0	0	4	0
Notts County	2014–15	League One	7	1	0	0	1	0	0	0	8	1
Nuneaton Town (loan)	2014–15	Conference Premier	5	0	0	0	—		0	0	5	0
FC Halifax Town	2015–16	National League	4	0	—		—		0	0	4	0
Nuneaton Town	2015–16	National League North	30	13	2	1	—		3 (Note: Two appearances in FA Trophy, one appearance in Birmingham Senior Cup)	0	35	14
Nuneaton Town	2016–17	National League North	9	6	1	0	—		0	0	10	6
Nuneaton Town	Total		39	19	3	1	—		3	0	45	20
Lincoln City	2016–17	National League	28	4	—		—		6 (Note: Appearance(s) in FA Trophy)	2	34	6
Lincoln City	2017–18	League Two	32	2	1	0	0	0	10 (Note: Eight appearances and two goals in EFL Trophy, two appearances in League Two play-offs)	2	43	4
Lincoln City	Total		60	6	1	0	0	0	16	4	77	10
Grimsby Town	2018–19	League Two	0	0	0	0	0	0	0	0	0	0
Grimsby Town	2019–20	League Two	33	3	2	0	2	0	1	0	38	3
Grimsby Town	Total		33	3	2	0	2	0	1	0	38	3
Forest Green Rovers	2020–21	League Two	27	2	1	0	0	0	2	0	30	2
Forest Green Rovers	2021–22	League Two	0	0	0	0	0	0	0	0	0	0
Forest Green Rovers	Total		27	2	1	0	0	0	2	0	30	2
Scunthorpe United	2022–23	National League	19	1	1	0	—		0	0	20	1
Spennymoor Town (loan)	2022–23	National League North	3	0	—		—		1	0	4	0
Chester (loan)	2022–23	National League North	7	3	—		—		1 (Note: Appearance(s) in National League North play-offs)	0	8	3
Chester	2023–24	National League North	40	9	5	1	—		1	0	46	10
Chester	Total		47	12	5	1	—		2	0	54	13
Macclesfield	2024–25	NPL Premier Division	6	0	0	0	—		0	0	6	0
Matlock Town (loan)	2024–25	NPL Premier Division	11	1	0	0	—		0	0	11	1
Career total			283	45	16	2	3	0	27	4	329	51

== Honours ==
Lincoln City

- National League: 2016–17
- EFL Trophy: 2017–18

Forest Green Rovers

- League Two: 2021–22
