= Vaughn Covil =

American soccer player (born 2003)

Personal information
- Full name: Vaughn Patrick Covil
- Date of birth: July 26, 2003 (age 23)
- Place of birth: San Diego, California, United States
- Height: 1.79 m (5 ft 10 in)
- Positions: Winger; forward

Team information
- Current team: AFC Totton

Youth career
- 2011-2013: Amesbury Town
- 2013–2014: Salisbury
- 2014–2019: Southampton
- 2019: Forest Green Rovers

Senior career*
Years	Team	Apps	(Gls)
2019–2022	Forest Green Rovers	2	(0)
2020	→ Salisbury (loan)	3	(0)
2021	→ Melksham Town (loan)	5	(0)
2022–2024	Hull City	6	(0)
2024–2025	Las Vegas Lights	22	(0)
2026–	AFC Totton	11	(0)

International career
2023	United States U23	5	(0)
- * Club domestic league appearances and goals as of 13:31, 18 August 2026 (UTC)

Vaughn Patrick Covil (born July 26, 2003) is an American professional soccer player who plays as a winger or forward for AFC Totton.

== Club career ==
Covil was born in San Diego, California, to an English father and a Canadian mother. He attended Bishop Wordsworth's School while playing youth soccer for Amesbury Town and Salisbury. In 2014, Covil joined the academy at Southampton, staying with the club for five years. In June 2019, he signed for EFL League Two club Forest Green Rovers. On October 8, 2019, Covil made his debut for Forest Green at 16 years old, in a 0–0 EFL Trophy draw against Coventry City, scoring a penalty in an 8–7 penalty shoot-out win. During the 2020–21 season, he was loaned out to Salisbury. The following season, Covil went out on loan to Melksham Town.

On July 6, 2022, Covil signed a one-year deal with Hull City, with the club holding an option of a further year. He featured in the 60th minute in a pre-season friendly against Fenerbache in Istanbul; started against Brighton and came on in the 65th minute against Malaga during first team pre-season tour in Marbella, Spain. Covil was named on the bench in the inaugural Corendon Cup which Hull City lost 0–4 to Leicester City F.C. The final pre-season friendly saw Covil start and help City win 1–2 against League 1 side Cambridge United. Covil made his debut as an 84th-minute substitute for Allahyar Sayyadmanesh on July 30, 2022, in the home match against Bristol City.

On 19 May 2024, the club announced he would be released in the summer when his contract expired.

Covil signed with Las Vegas Lights on August 9, 2024. He was released by Las Vegas following their 2025 season.

On 3 February 2026, Covil joined National League South side AFC Totton.

== International career ==
Covil holds dual American and British nationality and has been called up for England under-15s and the United States under-16s. He was called up to play for the United States U23s for the 2023 Pan American Games.

== Career statistics ==
As of August 8, 2023

Appearances and goals by club, season and competition
Club	Season	League			National cup		League cup (Note: Includes EFL Cup)		Other		Total	
Club	Season	Division	Apps	Goals	Apps	Goals	Apps	Goals	Apps	Goals	Apps	Goals
Forest Green Rovers	2019–20	League Two	2	0	0	0	0	0	2 (Note: Appearance(s) in EFL Trophy)	0	4	0
Forest Green Rovers	2020–21	League Two	0	0	0	0	0	0	3	0	3	0
Forest Green Rovers	Total		2	0	—		—		5	0	7	0
Hull City	2022–23	Championship	6	0	—		1	0	—		7	0
Hull City	2023–24	Championship	0	0	—		1	0	0	0	1	0
Hull City	Total		6	0	0	0	2	0	0	0	8	0
Career total			8	0	0	0	2	0	5	0	15	0
