= Paul Farman =

English footballer (born 1989)

Personal information
- Full name: Paul David Appleby Farman
- Date of birth: 2 November 1989 (age 37)
- Place of birth: North Shields, England
- Height: 6 ft 5 in (1.96 m)
- Position: Goalkeeper

Team information
- Current team: Swansea City
- Number: 29

Youth career
- 2008: Newcastle United

Senior career*
| Years | Team | Apps | (Gls) |
| 2008−2009 | Blyth Spartans | 14 | (0) |
| 2008 | → Washington (loan) | 5 | (0) |
| 2009−2012 | Gateshead | 64 | (0) |
| 2011−2012 | → Lincoln City (loan) | 8 | (0) |
| 2012−2018 | Lincoln City | 201 | (0) |
| 2014−2015 | → Boston United (loan) | 4 | (0) |
| 2018−2020 | Stevenage | 68 | (0) |
| 2020−2021 | Carlisle United | 42 | (0) |
| 2021−2025 | Barrow | 161 | (0) |
| 2025− | Swansea City | 0 | (0) |
- * Club domestic league appearances and goals as of 14:49, 25 March 2025 (UTC)

Paul David Appleby Farman (born 2 November 1989) is an English professional footballer who plays as a goalkeeper for EFL Championship club Swansea City.

Farman started playing first-team football for Blyth Spartans of the Conference North during the 2008–09 season. Prior to making his debut for Blyth, he was loaned out to Washington in order to gain first-team experience. He joined Conference Premier club Gateshead ahead of the 2009–10 season, and spent three seasons there. During his time at Gateshead, Farman joined fellow Conference Premier club Lincoln City on a loan deal in November 2011, later signing for the club on a permanent basis in May 2012. Farman spent six seasons at Lincoln, helping them achieve promotion to League Two after winning the National League, as well as winning the EFL Trophy during the 2017–18 season. He signed for Stevenage in June 2018 and spent two seasons there. Farman joined Carlisle United in August 2020, followed by rivals Barrow a year later.

== Club career ==
=== Early career ===
Farman began playing as a goalkeeper at the age of seven after he attended a goalkeeping course in the summer holidays. The course resulted in him being asked to play for North Shields Boys Club. He spent time on trial at Newcastle United's youth academy in 2008 after two of Newcastle's goalkeepers were injured. He was not offered professional terms with Newcastle and subsequently joined Conference North club Blyth Spartans during the 2008–09 season. Farman was loaned out to Washington during the opening months of the campaign in order to play games and experience first-team football, where he was earning £35 per week. He returned to Blyth in October 2008 and made his first-team debut in a 1–0 win over Buxton in the FA Cup. He was Blyth's second-choice goalkeeper for most of the season behind Mark Bell, playing 17 times in all competitions during the campaign.

=== Gateshead ===
Ahead of the 2009–10 season, Farman signed for Conference Premier club Gateshead. He made his Gateshead debut a month into the new season, keeping a clean sheet in a 0–0 draw with Rushden & Diamonds on 22 September 2009. He remained a regular starter for the remainder of the season, making 35 appearances. Before the start of the 2010–11 campaign, Farman had to have an operation due to injury and was ruled out of first-team action until November 2010. The form of his replacement, Tim Deasy, meant that Farman was limited to just eight appearances during the season. He was offered a short-term contract extension by manager Ian Bogie in May 2011, who stated Farman would remain at the club if he impressed him in pre-season.

He began the 2011–12 season as Gateshead's first-choice goalkeeper, keeping two clean sheets in the club's opening six fixtures. His contract was subsequently extended for the remainder of the season on 1 September 2011. Despite having played regularly for Gateshead during the opening months of the season, Farman was loaned out to fellow Conference National club Lincoln City on a two-month loan deal on 3 November 2011. Farman made his Lincoln debut in a 2–1 home win over Barrow on 5 November 2011, and made eight appearances during the brief loan spell. He returned to Gateshead in January 2012 and ended the campaign having played 25 times for the club that season.

=== Lincoln City ===
Having spent time on loan at Lincoln City the previous season, Farman signed for the club on a permanent basis on 25 May 2012. He made his second debut on the opening day of the club's 2012–13 season as Lincoln secured a 1–0 win over Kidderminster Harriers at Sincil Bank. Farman was Lincoln's first-choice goalkeeper throughout the season, making 47 appearances in all competitions. He signed a new two-year contract extension with the club on 14 May 2013. Farman made 38 appearances during the 2013–14 season. Having played in every one of Lincoln's matches during the campaign, Farman's season was cut short in February 2014 when he suffered an injury in Lincoln's 4–3 away win over Hyde United; he was substituted in the match after 75 minutes and it proved to be his last appearance of the season.

Farman began the 2014–15 season behind new loan signing, Nick Townsend, who had served as Farman's replacement for the remainder of the previous season. Having not made an appearance during the first month of the campaign, Farman was loaned out to Conference North club Boston United on 11 September 2014. The loan deal was for an initial three-month period. He made his Boston debut in a 3–2 loss away to Stockport County two days after joining the club. Farman made four appearances in the opening month of the spell before he was recalled by Lincoln after Birmingham City had withdrawn permission for Townsend to play in the FA Cup. Farman returned to Lincoln and consequently regained his place as the club's first-choice goalkeeper immediately. Having been ever present since being recalled from the loan spell, Farman signed a new two-year contract with the club on 25 February 2015. He made 32 appearances for Lincoln during the season, and was named as the club's Player of the Yeason at the end-of-season awards. Farman cemented his place as Lincoln's first-choice goalkeeper, making 49 appearances in all competitions during the 2015–16 season.

Farman was a mainstay in the side during the 2016–17 campaign as Lincoln won promotion to League Two after securing the National League title as champions. He kept 22 clean sheets in the club's 46 league matches. He was also part of the side that made the FA Cup quarter-finals that season. He played in all nine of the club's FA Cup fixtures as they defeated Premier League club Burnley at Turf Moor before losing to eventual winners Arsenal. Farman made 58 appearances during the campaign. With his contract due to run out at the end of the season, Lincoln manager Danny Cowley offered Farman a two-year contract extension, which he signed on 11 May 2017. The 2017–18 season began with Farman making his Football League debut in a 2–2 draw with Wycombe Wanderers on the opening day of the campaign. Following Lincoln's 4–1 loss away at Notts County on 23 September 2017, Farman was limited to just eight further appearances during the season. Five of these came in the EFL Trophy, which Lincoln would go on to win, although Farman was an unused substitute in the final. He made 18 appearances during the season. Farman played 242 times during his six years at Lincoln.

=== Stevenage ===
Farman signed for fellow League Two club Stevenage on 12 June 2018. He made his Stevenage debut in the club's opening match of the 2018–19 season, a 2–2 draw with Tranmere Rovers at Broadhall Way. Despite starting the season as Stevenage's first choice goalkeeper, Farman lost his place to loanee Seny Dieng in September 2018, although regained the position from December through to the end of the season. He made 34 appearances during his first campaign with the club.

=== Carlisle United ===
On 17 August 2020, Farman signed for League Two side Carlisle United on a one-year contract.

=== Barrow ===
Having been offered a new contract with Carlisle at the end of the season, Farman instead joined Barrow signing a two-year contract.

On 7 May 2025, Barrow announced the player would be leaving in June when his contract expired. Farman has claimed that it was not his decision to leave the club, and he was disappointed with the news.

=== Swansea City ===
On 8 August 2025, Farman joined Championship club Swansea City on a one-year contract having left Barrow earlier in the summer.

== International career ==
Farman was called up to represent the England C team, who represent England at non-league level, for their fixture against India U23s at Victoria Road in September 2011. He was set to make his debut, but the match was cancelled due to the 2011 England riots. He also made the stand-by list several times. He was called up once again during his time at Lincoln City in October 2012. Farman was due to make his debut by playing the second-half against Albania U23, but the match was postponed due to the rain.

== Career statistics ==
As of match played 6 January 2024

Appearances and goals by club, season and competition
| Club | Season | League | | | FA Cup | | League Cup | | Other | | Total | |
| Club | Season | Division | Apps | Goals | Apps | Goals | Apps | Goals | Apps | Goals | Apps | Goals |
|---|---|---|---|---|---|---|---|---|---|---|---|---|
| Blyth Spartans | 2008–09 | Conference North | 17 | 0 | 0 | 0 | — | | 0 | 0 | 17 | 0 |
| Washington (loan) | 2008–09 | Northern League Division Two | 5 | 0 | 0 | 0 | — | | 0 | 0 | 5 | 0 |
| Gateshead | 2009–10 | Conference Premier | 33 | 0 | 2 | 0 | — | | 0 | 0 | 35 | 0 |
| Gateshead | 2010–11 | Conference Premier | 6 | 0 | 0 | 0 | — | | 2 (Note: Appearance(s) in the FA Trophy) | 0 | 8 | 0 |
| Gateshead | 2011–12 | Conference Premier | 25 | 0 | 0 | 0 | — | | 0 | 0 | 25 | 0 |
| Gateshead | Total | | 64 | 0 | 2 | 0 | 0 | 0 | 2 | 0 | 68 | 0 |
| Lincoln City (loan) | 2011–12 | Conference Premier | 8 | 0 | 0 | 0 | — | | 0 | 0 | 8 | 0 |
| Lincoln City | 2012–13 | Conference Premier | 40 | 0 | 6 | 0 | — | | 1 | 0 | 47 | 0 |
| Lincoln City | 2013–14 | Conference Premier | 31 | 0 | 4 | 0 | — | | 3 | 0 | 38 | 0 |
| Lincoln City | 2014–15 | Conference Premier | 28 | 0 | 3 | 0 | — | | 1 | 0 | 32 | 0 |
| Lincoln City | 2015–16 | National League | 45 | 0 | 3 | 0 | — | | 1 | 0 | 49 | 0 |
| Lincoln City | 2016–17 | National League | 44 | 0 | 9 | 0 | — | | 5 | 0 | 58 | 0 |
| Lincoln City | 2017–18 | League Two | 13 | 0 | 0 | 0 | 0 | 0 | 5 (Note: Appearance(s) in the EFL Trophy) | 0 | 18 | 0 |
| Lincoln City | Total | | 209 | 0 | 25 | 0 | 0 | 0 | 16 | 0 | 250 | 0 |
| Boston United (loan) | 2014–15 | Conference North | 4 | 0 | 0 | 0 | — | | 0 | 0 | 4 | 0 |
| Stevenage | 2018–19 | League Two | 33 | 0 | 0 | 0 | 0 | 0 | 1 | 0 | 34 | 0 |
| Stevenage | 2019–20 | League Two | 35 | 0 | 2 | 0 | 1 | 0 | 3 | 0 | 41 | 0 |
| Stevenage | Total | | 68 | 0 | 2 | 0 | 1 | 0 | 4 | 0 | 75 | 0 |
| Carlisle United | 2020–21 | League Two | 42 | 0 | 1 | 0 | 1 | 0 | 1 | 0 | 45 | 0 |
| Barrow | 2021–22 | League Two | 46 | 0 | 4 | 0 | 2 | 0 | 0 | 0 | 52 | 0 |
| Barrow | 2022–23 | League Two | 43 | 0 | 1 | 0 | 2 | 0 | 1 | 0 | 47 | 0 |
| Barrow | 2023–24 | League Two | 44 | 0 | 2 | 0 | 1 | 0 | 0 | 0 | 47 | 0 |
| Barrow | 2024–25 | League Two | 28 | 0 | 0 | 0 | 3 | 0 | 1 | 0 | 32 | 0 |
| Barrow | Total | | 133 | 0 | 7 | 0 | 5 | 0 | 1 | 0 | 146 | 0 |
| Career total | | | 540 | 0 | 34 | 0 | 7 | 0 | 24 | 0 | 605 | 0 |

== Honours ==
Lincoln City

- National League: 2016–17
- EFL Trophy: 2017–18

Individual

- Lincoln City Player of the Year: 2014–15
