= Matt Green (footballer) =

English footballer

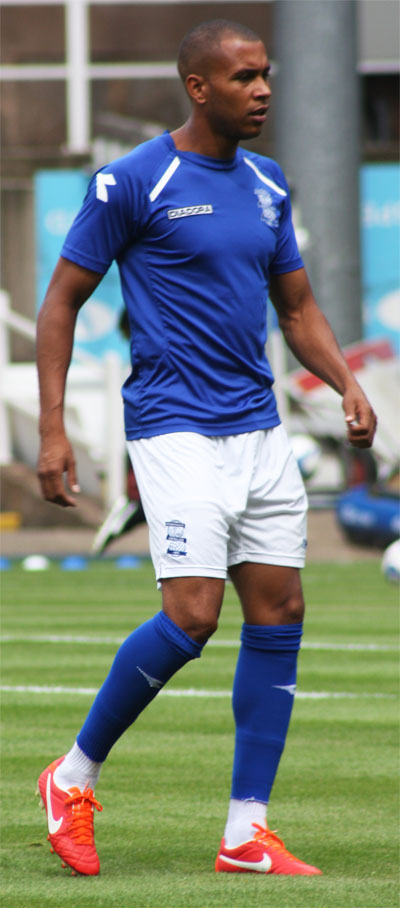
- Green training with Birmingham City in July 2013

Personal information
- Full name: Matthew James Green
- Date of birth: 2 January 1987 (age 39)
- Place of birth: Bath, England
- Height: 6 ft 0 in (1.83 m)
- Position: Striker

Youth career
- Bristol City

Senior career*
Years	Team	Apps	(Gls)
2005–2007	Newport County	56	(8)
2007–2008	Cardiff City	6	(0)
2007	→ Darlington (loan)	4	(0)
2007	→ Oxford United (loan)	2	(1)
2008	→ Oxford United (loan)	18	(9)
2008–2010	Torquay United	29	(4)
2009–2010	→ Oxford United (loan)	38	(8)
2010–2012	Oxford United	17	(0)
2011	→ Cheltenham Town (loan)	19	(0)
2011	→ Mansfield Town (loan)	25	(14)
2012–2013	Mansfield Town	62	(40)
2013–2015	Birmingham City	10	(1)
2015–2017	Mansfield Town	86	(26)
2017–2018	Lincoln City	64	(15)
2018–2019	Salford City	21	(4)
2019–2021	Grimsby Town	57	(5)
2021	Linfield	14	(4)
2022	Gloucester City	19	(2)
2022	Yate Town	3	(0)
2023–2024	Newport City		
2024	Eastbourne Borough	9	(1)
2025	Eastbourne Borough	6	(0)
2025	Hereford Pegasus	0	(0)
Total		565	(142)

International career
2009	England C	1	(0)

Managerial career
- 2024–2025: Eastbourne Borough (assistant)
- * Club domestic league appearances and goals

Matthew James Green (born 2 January 1987) is an English former footballer who played as a striker.

Green started his senior career at Conference South club Newport County in 2005, having been released from Bristol City's youth academy. He made 56 league appearances for Newport County in a two-season spell at the club, before joining Championship side Cardiff City in January 2007. Having made six appearances for Cardiff during the 2006–07 season, he had three loan spells away from the club the following season: one at League Two club Darlington in October 2007, where he made five appearances, and two for Conference Premier side Oxford United, where he made 21 appearances.

Having been released by Cardiff at the end of the 2007–08 season, he switched to Conference side Torquay United in May 2008. He made 29 league appearances for Torquay during the 2008–09 season, but joined Oxford United for a third loan spell the following season. Having made 41 league appearances for Oxford during the 2009–10 season, he signed a permanent deal with the club, where he made a further 17 appearances. He spent the latter half of the 2010–11 season on loan to League Two side Cheltenham Town, where he made 19 league appearances and then joined Conference side Mansfield Town in July 2011, initially on loan, but permanently from January 2012 onwards. He made 87 league appearances for Mansfield, scoring 54 goals, before signing for Championship club Birmingham City, where he spent two seasons, one-and-a-half of which were lost to injury. He returned to Mansfield, where he was nearly ever-present for two seasons, then spent 18 months at Lincoln City, with whom he won the 2017–18 EFL Trophy, before signing for Salford City in December 2018. He joined Grimsby Town in June 2019 where he remained for two seasons, and then joined Linfield.

== Club career ==
=== Early career ===
Born in Bath, Somerset, Green was a member of the Bristol City youth programme but was released by the club as they deemed he was too small to play professional football. An England schoolboy international, Green went on to join the Cirencester Academy under the direction of former Newport County and Welsh international player Steve Lowndes who recommended him to Newport in the 2005 close season. A pacey striker, he made a big impact in his first season, making 30 appearances for the Newport County first team in all competitions. He was a part-time player at Newport and worked full-time at a nearby car auction warehouse before he began to attract interest.

Several teams watched him while he played for Newport, including Bristol City, Reading, Stoke City and Swansea City, but instead Green joined Cardiff City in January 2007 for a fee of £10,000 with possible add-ons depending on appearances. Green had played alongside several former Cardiff players at Newport including Nathan Blake, Jason Bowen and Damon Searle. Green made his debut for his new club against Preston North End on 23 February, coming on for the final few minutes as a substitute for Michael Chopra in Cardiff's 4–1 home win. He made five further appearances, all as a substitute, later that season. At the start of the 2007–08 season Green was included in a two-game pre-season tour of Portugal where he made appearances in both games, scoring in one. He also appeared as a substitute in Cardiff's first-round League Cup win at home to Brighton & Hove Albion.

In October 2007 Green signed a one-month loan deal at League Two club Darlington. He made his debut for Darlington on 9 October against Leeds United in the Football League Trophy. He started the match on the bench, but was brought on earlier than planned due to the injury of teammate Tommy Wright. He hit the post late in the game as Leeds won 1–0. He returned to Cardiff on 8 November after making five appearances in all competitions for Darlington.

He joined Oxford United on an emergency one-month loan on 22 November and scored on his debut two days later against Kidderminster Harriers. He made two further appearances for Oxford during his loan spell, an FA Cup draw at home to Southend United and in the Conference Premier defeat away to Northwich Victoria, before suffering a broken collarbone and returning to Cardiff for treatment.

He rejoined Oxford on 25 January 2008 on loan until the end of the season. He scored twice in the 3–0 home win against Histon on 9 February, and went on to make a total of 18 appearances before returning to Cardiff where he was released on his return.

Despite Oxford's interest in taking Green on a permanent deal, and suggestions from manager Darren Patterson that the player had verbally agreed to sign, on 31 May he signed for Conference rivals Torquay United. Green began the season on the bench for Torquay, making regular substitute appearances, and on 23 September he scored his first goal for the club with a late winner away to Forest Green Rovers. On 3 January 2009, he scored the only goal of the game as Torquay eliminated Championship team Blackpool in the FA Cup third round.

Green rejoined Oxford on loan for the 2009–10 season. He was named in the England C squad to face a Polish under-23 team in November, but had to withdraw with an ankle injury.

He helped Oxford finish third in the Conference, scoring 10 goals. On 16 May 2010, he scored the opening goal at Wembley Stadium as Oxford defeated York City 3–1 in the 2010 Conference Premier play-off final to return to the Football League after a four-year exile. He signed a two-year contract with Oxford on 2 June; the fee was undisclosed. On 31 January 2011, he signed on loan at Cheltenham Town until the end of the season.

=== Mansfield Town ===
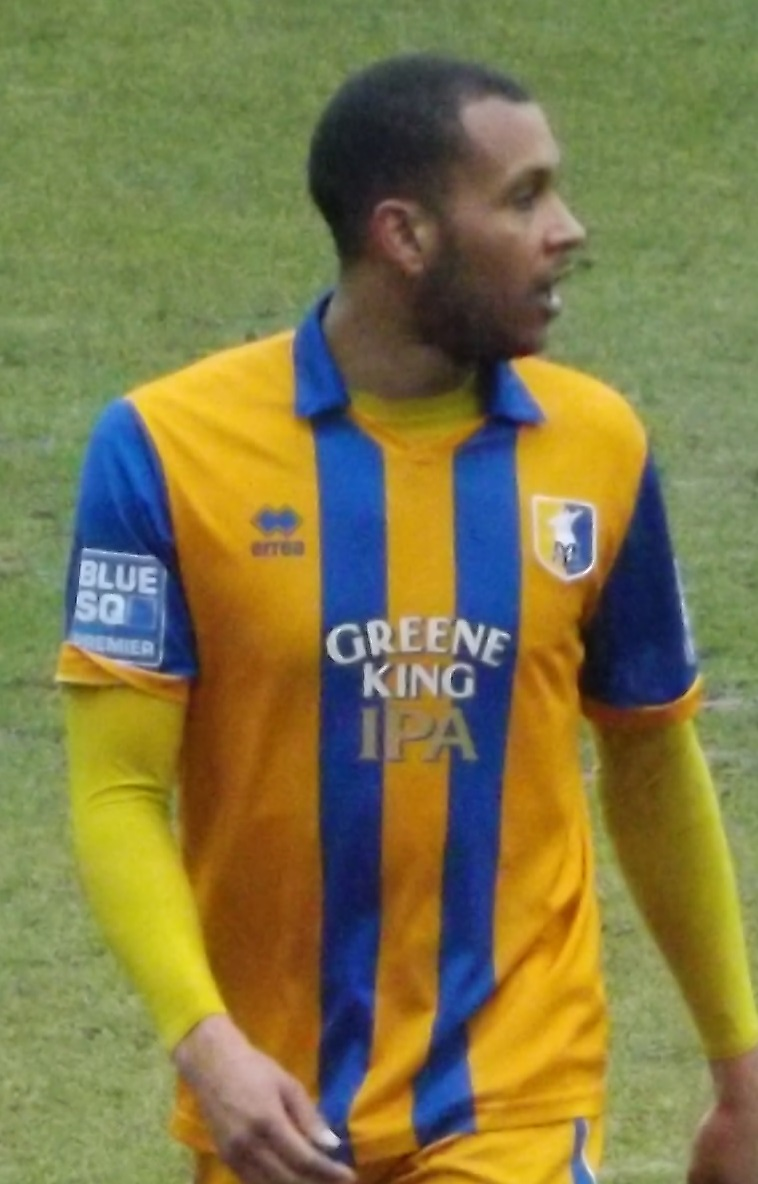
Green playing for Mansfield Town in 2013

On 22 July 2011, it was announced that Green would be joining Mansfield Town on loan until 31 December of the same year, with £2,000 donated towards the transfer by fans' group The 12th Stag. He was an immediate hit, scoring 14 goals in 25 appearances, and signed an 18-month contract with the club on 1 January 2012. He scored on his first day as a permanent Mansfield player in a 2–2 draw away to York City, and went on to score 56 goals in just 92 appearances for the club in the Conference.

=== Birmingham City ===
After a trial with Championship club Birmingham City in May 2013, Green signed a two-year contract with the club on 3 July 2013. He scored his first goal for the club against Shamrock Rovers during a pre-season tour of Ireland, but was then knocked unconscious in a challenge and received eight minutes of treatment before being stretchered off. He made his debut in a 1–0 defeat at home to Watford on 3 August, and his first competitive goal for the club opened the scoring in a 3–2 defeat at Leicester City three weeks later. Green scored the second goal, "a superb right-foot finish at the back post" from Mitch Hancox's cross, as Birmingham beat holders Swansea City 3–1 in the third round of the League Cup. He started the next three games, without scoring, but was omitted from the matchday squad thereafter. In early November, Green damaged cruciate ligaments in training and was expected to miss the rest of the season. His recovery was beset by complications, and he finally regained fitness towards the end of the 2014–15 season, making appearances for the development squad and scoring in the Birmingham Senior Cup final. The club confirmed he would be released when his contract expired.

=== Return to Mansfield Town ===
Following his release by Birmingham, Green returned to Mansfield Town on 22 May 2015. He scored a header against Carlisle United to keep Mansfield's hopes of promotion alive, but this goal proved to be his last for the club, and he was released at the end of the 2016–17 season.

=== Lincoln City ===
On 27 June 2017, Green signed a two-year contract with newly promoted League Two side Lincoln City. He scored his first goal for Lincoln on his debut in a 2–2 draw with Wycombe Wanderers on the opening day of the season. Green finished the season as Lincoln's top scorer, with 17 goals from 56 appearances in all competitions, as his team reached the play-offs, in which they lost to Exeter City on aggregate despite Green's lively performance in the first leg and goal in the second. He contributed three goals to their run to the 2018 EFL Trophy Final, and played almost the whole of the match – he was substituted deep into stoppage time – as Lincoln beat League One club Shrewsbury Town 1–0. After the club made John Akinde – a similar style of player – their record signing in the close season, Green found himself out of the starting eleven. By mid-December he had made 19 league appearances, of which 17 were from the bench.

=== Salford City ===
Lincoln accepted an undisclosed offer from National League club Salford City, and Green signed a two-and-a-half-year contract on 20 December 2018. He scored four goals from 21 appearances as Salford reached the play-Offs, but was sent off in the last match of the season so missed out on the club's promotion to the Football League. He left the club at the end of the season.

=== Grimsby Town ===
On 10 June 2019, Green joined League Two club Grimsby Town on a two-year contract. On 25 September, Green scored Grimsby's only goal in a defeat to Chelsea in the third round of the EFL Cup. A long ball caught out the Chelsea defence and Green scored with a volley in the 19th minute to bring the score back to 2–1, but Grimsby lost the game 7–1.

Green scored eight goals from 66 appearances in all competitions over two seasons, and was released when his contract expired at the end of the 2020–21 season.

=== Linfield ===
Green signed for NIFL Premiership club Linfield in August 2021. He scored five goals from 17 appearances in all competitions before his contract was terminated by mutual consent in late December.

=== Gloucester City ===
On 21 January 2022, Green signed for National League North side Gloucester City.

=== Yate Town ===
On 17 July 2022, Green dropped down a division to join Southern League Premier Division South club Yate Town.

=== Newport City ===
In July 2023, Green returned to Wales to sign for Welsh third-tier club Newport City.

=== Eastbourne Borough ===
On 16 March 2024, Green signed for National League South club Eastbourne Borough until the end of the season.

== International career ==
Green was capped once by the England national C team, in a 1–1 draw with Hungary on 15 September 2009.

== Coaching career ==
Green joined Eastbourne Borough as assistant manager, on 28 November 2024, following the departure of Stuart Watkiss.

== Career statistics ==
As of 4 May 2025

Appearances and goals by club, season and competition
Club	Season	League			National cup (Note: Includes FA Cup, Irish Cup)		League cup (Note: Includes Football League Cup/EFL Cup, Northern Ireland League Cup)		Other		Total	
Club	Season	Division	Apps	Goals	Apps	Goals	Apps	Goals	Apps	Goals	Apps	Goals
Newport County	2005–06	Conference South	36	4	1	0	—		3 (Note: One appearance in FA Trophy, one appearance in FAW Premier Cup, one appearance and one goal in Gwent Senior Cup)	1	40	5
Newport County	2006–07	Conference South	20	4	4	0	—		5 (Note: Four appearances and three goals in FA Trophy, one appearance in FAW Premier Cup)	3	29	7
Newport County	Total		56	8	5	0	—		8	4	69	12
Cardiff City	2006–07	Championship	6	0	—		—		—		6	0
Cardiff City	2007–08	Championship	0	0	0	0	1	0	—		1	0
Cardiff City	Total		6	0	0	0	1	0	—		7	0
Darlington (loan)	2007–08	League Two	4	0	—		—		1 (Note: Appearance in Football League Trophy)	0	5	0
Oxford United (loan)	2007–08	Conference Premier	20	10	1	0	—		—		21	10
Torquay United	2008–09	Conference Premier	29	4	3	1	—		5 (Note: Three appearances in FA Trophy, two appearances in Conference League Cup)	0	37	5
Torquay United	2009–10	League Two	0	0	0	0	0	0	0	0	0	0
Torquay United	Total		29	4	3	1	0	0	5	0	37	5
Oxford United (loan)	2009–10	Conference Premier	38	8	2	0	—		7 (Note: Four appearances and two goals in FA Trophy, three appearances and two goals in Conference Premier play-offs)	4	47	12
Oxford United	2010–11	League Two	17	0	1	0	2	1	1	0	21	1
Oxford United	2011–12	League Two	0	0	0	0	0	0	0	0	0	0
Oxford United	Total		55	8	3	0	2	1	8	4	68	13
Cheltenham Town (loan)	2010–11	League Two	19	0	—		—		—		19	0
Mansfield Town (loan)	2011–12	Conference Premier	25	14	1	0	—		1 (Note: Appearance(s) in FA Trophy)	1	27	15
Mansfield Town	2011–12	Conference Premier	20	15	—		—		1 (Note: Appearances in Conference Premier play-offs)	0	21	15
Mansfield Town	2012–13	Conference Premier	42	25	5	2	—		2	0	49	27
Mansfield Town	Total		87	54	6	2	—		4	1	97	57
Birmingham City	2013–14	Championship	10	1	0	0	2	1	—		12	2
Birmingham City	2014–15	Championship	0	0	0	0	0	0	—		0	0
Birmingham City	Total		10	1	0	0	2	1	—		12	2
Mansfield Town	2015–16	League Two	44	16	2	0	0	0	0	0	46	16
Mansfield Town	2016–17	League Two	42	10	1	0	1	0	5 (Note: Appearance(s) in EFL Trophy)	3	49	13
Mansfield Town	Total		86	26	3	0	1	0	5	3	95	29
Lincoln City	2017–18	League Two	45	13	1	0	1	0	9 (Note: Seven appearances and three goals in EFL Trophy, two appearances and one goal in League Two play-offs)	4	56	17
Lincoln City	2018–19	League Two	19	2	2	0	2	1	3	3	26	6
Lincoln City	Total		64	15	3	0	3	1	12	7	82	23
Salford City	2018–19	National League	21	4	—		—		0	0	21	4
Grimsby Town	2019–20	League Two	29	2	2	0	3	1	1	1	35	4
Grimsby Town	2020–21	League Two	28	3	1	0	1	1	1	0	31	4
Grimsby Town	Total		57	5	3	0	4	2	2	1	66	8
Linfield	2021–22.	NIFL Premiership	14	4	—		3	1	0	0	17	5
Gloucester City	2021–22	National League North	19	2	—		—		—		19	2
Yate Town	2022–23	Southern League Premier South	3	0	—		—		—		3	0
Newport City	2023–24	Ardal Leagues SE										
Eastbourne Borough	2023–24	National League South	9	1	—		—		—		9	1
Eastbourne Borough	2024–25	National League South	6	0	—		—		2 (Note: One appearance in National League South play-offs, one appearance and one goal in Sussex Senior Cup)	1	8	1
Eastbourne Borough	Total		15	1	0	0	0	0	2	1	17	2
Career total			565	156	27	3	16	6	47	22	654	172

== Honours ==
Oxford United

- Conference Premier play-offs: 2010

Mansfield Town

- Conference Premier: 2012–13

Lincoln City

- EFL League Two: 2018–19
- EFL Trophy: 2017–18

Individual

- Conference Premier Team of the Year: 2012–13
- Conference Premier Golden Boot: 2012–13
