= 2018 EFL Trophy final =

2018 EFL Trophy Final
- Match programme cover
- Event: 2017–18 EFL Trophy
Lincoln City	Shrewsbury Town
1	0
- Date: 8 April 2018
- Venue: Wembley Stadium, London
- Referee: Gavin Ward
- Attendance: 41,261

The 2018 EFL Trophy Final was a football match that took place on 8 April 2018 at Wembley Stadium, London. It was the final match of the 2017–18 EFL Trophy, the 34th edition of the EFL Trophy, a competition for the 48 clubs in EFL League One and EFL League Two, and 16 under-21 sides from Premier League and EFL Championship clubs. It was contested by Lincoln City, from League Two, and Shrewsbury Town, from League One. Lincoln City won the game 1–0, with the goal scored by Elliott Whitehouse. It was Lincoln's first cup win in any competition.

== Route to the final ==
Note: In all results below, the score of the finalist is given first (H: home; A: away).

Lincoln City		Round	Shrewsbury Town	
Opponent	Result	Group stage	Opponent	Result
Mansfield Town	3–1 (A)	Match 1	Coventry City	3–2 (A)
Everton U21s	2–1 (H)	Match 2	West Bromwich Albion U21s	3–0 (H)
Notts County	2–1 (H)	Match 3	Walsall	0–1 (H)
Group G (Northern Section) winners: Pos / Team / Pld / Pts; 1 / Lincoln City (Q) / 3 / 9; 2 / Mansfield Town (Q) / 3 / 6; 3 / Notts County (E) / 3 / 3; 4 / Everton U21s (E) / 3 / 0; Source: EFL.com (E) Eliminated; (Q) Qualified to the phase indicated		Final standings	Group E (Northern Section) runners-up: Pos / Team / Pld / Pts; 1 / Walsall (Q) / 3 / 7; 2 / Shrewsbury Town (Q) / 3 / 6; 3 / Coventry City (E) / 3 / 5; 4 / West Bromwich Albion U21s (E) / 3 / 0; Source: EFL.com (E) Eliminated; (Q) Qualified to the phase indicated	
Opponent	Result	Knockout phase	Opponent	Result
Accrington Stanley	3–2 (H)	Round 2	Port Vale	2–1 (A)
Rochdale	1–0 (A)	Round 3	Blackpool	0–0 (H) (4–2 p)
Peterborough United	4–2 (H)	Round 4	Oldham Athletic	2–1 (H)
Chelsea U21s	1–1 (H) (4–2 p)	Semi-finals	Yeovil Town	1–0 (H)

== Match ==
=== Details ===
8 April 2018
15:00 BST

Lincoln City	1–0	Shrewsbury Town
Whitehouse 16'	Report

Wembley Stadium, London
Attendance: 41,261
Referee: Gavin Ward

Lincoln City	Shrewsbury Town

GK	22	(England) Ryan Allsop
RB	23	(Wales) Neal Eardley
CB	16	(England) Michael Bostwick
CB	5	(England) Luke Waterfall
LB	3	(England) Sam Habergham
DM	30	(England) Alex Woodyard
CM	4	(England) Elliott Whitehouse
CM	19	(England) Lee Frecklington	(yellow card) 83'
RW	10	(England) Matt Green		(substituted off) 90+5'
LW	24	(England) Danny Rowe		(substituted off) 64'
CF	9	(England) Matt Rhead	(yellow card) 10'	(substituted off) 63'
Substitutes:
GK	1	(England) Paul Farman
DF	2	(Republic of Ireland) Sean Long		(substituted on) 90+5'
MF	12	(England) Ellis Chapman
MF	26	(England) Harry Anderson		(substituted on) 64'
MF	32	(England) Cameron Stewart
MF	36	(England) Declan O'Hare
FW	8	(England) Ollie Palmer		(substituted on) 63'
Manager:
(England) Danny Cowley

GK	1	(England) Dean Henderson
RB	13	(England) James Bolton
CB	22	(Democratic Republic of the Congo) Aristote Nsiala	(yellow card) 49'
CB	5	(England) Mat Sadler
LB	6	(England) Omar Beckles
DM	16	(England) Bryn Morris		(substituted off) 67'
RM	7	(England) Shaun Whalley		(substituted off) 86'
CM	20	(England) Jon Nolan	(yellow card) 84'
CM	4	(England) Ben Godfrey
LM	10	(England) Nathan Thomas		(substituted off) 75'
CF	9	(England) Carlton Morris
Substitutes:
GK	15	(England) Craig MacGillivray
DF	3	(England) Max Lowe
MF	21	(Sudan) Abo Eisa
MF	23	(England) Alex Rodman		(substituted on) 67'
FW	11	(France) Arthur Gnahoua		(substituted on) 86'
FW	14	(England) Lenell John-Lewis
FW	45	(England) Stefan Payne		(substituted on) 75'
Manager:
(England) Paul Hurst
