= 2018–19 Lincoln City F.C. season =

Lincoln City
2018–19 season
- Chairman: Clive Nates
- Manager: Danny Cowley
- Stadium: Sincil Bank, Lincoln
- League Two: 1st (promoted)
- FA Cup: Third round (Eliminated by Everton)
- EFL Cup: Second round (Eliminated by Blackburn Rovers)
- EFL Trophy: Second round (Eliminated by Accrington Stanley)
- Top goalscorer: League: John Akinde (15); All: John Akinde (17)
- Highest home attendance: 9,832 (vs Colchester United; League 2)
- Lowest home attendance: 2,723 (vs Wolverhampton Wanderers U21; EFL Trophy)
- Average home league attendance: 9,006
Home colours	Away colours

The 2018–19 season is Lincoln City's 135th season in their history and their second season back in League Two after missing out on the League Two playoff final in the 2017/2018 season. Along with League Two, the club also participates in the FA Cup, and has been eliminated from the EFL Cup and EFL Trophy.

The season covers the period from 1 July 2018 to 30 June 2019.

== Transfers & Contracts ==
=== Transfers in ===
Date from	Position	Nationality	Name	From	Fee	Ref.
1 July 2018	SS	POR	Bruno Andrade	Boreham Wood	Free transfer	
1 July 2018	CM	NIR	Michael O’Connor	Notts County	Free transfer	
1 July 2018	GK	ENG	Grant Smith	Boreham Wood	Free transfer	
1 July 2018	LB	ENG	Harry Toffolo	Millwall	Free transfer	
6 July 2018	CF	ENG	John Akinde	Barnet	Undisclosed	
9 August 2018	AM	ESP	Joan Luque	Heybridge Swifts	Undisclosed	
9 August 2018	CB	ENG	Jason Shackell	Derby County	Free transfer	
17 January 2019	CB	IRE	Cian Bolger	Fleetwood Town	Undisclosed	
31 January 2019	GK	SCO	Matt Gilks	Scunthorpe United	Free transfer	

=== Transfers out ===
Date from	Position	Nationality	Name	To	Fee	Ref.
1 July 2018	LW	ENG	Nathan Arnold	Boston United	Mutual Consent	
1 July 2018	GK	ENG	Paul Farman	Stevenage	Undisclosed	
1 July 2018	CM	ENG	Billy Knott	Concord Rangers	Released	
1 July 3018	FB	IRE	Sean Long	Cheltenham Town	Free Transfer	
1 July 2018	CF	ENG	Ollie Palmer	Crawley Town	Undisclosed	
1 July 2018	LW	ENG	Cameron Stewart	Free agent	Mutual Consent	
1 July 2018	CM	ENG	Elliott Whitehouse	Grimsby Town	Free transfer	
1 July 2018	CM	ENG	Alex Woodyard	Peterborough United	Undisclosed	
13 July 2018	GK	ENG	Richard Walton	Matlock Town	Undisclosed	
6 August 2018	CB	ENG	Luke Waterfall	Shrewsbury Town	Undisclosed	
20 December 2018	CF	ENG	Matt Green	Salford City	Undisclosed	
2 January 2019	AM	ESP	Joan Luque	Concord Rangers	Released	
29 June 2019	CB	WAL	James Wilson	Ipswich Town	Mutual consent	

=== Loans in ===
Start date	Position	Nationality	Name	From	End date	Ref.
22 July 2018	CB	ENG	Scott Wharton	Blackburn Rovers	23 January 2019	
24 July 2018	SS	NIR	Shay McCartan	Bradford City	31 May 2019	
2 August 2018	RB	ENG	Adam Crookes	Nottingham Forest	14 January 2019	
21 August 2018	GK	ENG	Sam Slocombe	Bristol Rovers	9 January 2019	
28 August 2018	DF	ENG	Kellan Gordon	Derby County	21 January 2019	
31 August 2018	FW	ENG	Bernard Mensah	Bristol Rovers	21 January 2019	
17 January 2019	DF	ENG	James Brown	Millwall	31 May 2019	
17 January 2019	LW	ENG	Danny Rowe	Ipswich Town	31 May 2019	
23 January 2019	MF	ENG	Jordan Roberts	Ipswich Town	31 May 2019	
24 January 2019	MF	SCO	Mark O'Hara	Peterborough United	31 May 2019	
31 January 2019	FW	ENG	Lee Angol	Shrewsbury Town	31 May 2019	

=== Loans out ===
Start date	Position	Nationality	Name	To	End date	Ref.
21 September 2018	AM	SPA	Joan Luque	Bromley	4 December 2018	
29 October 2018	GK	ENG	Grant Smith	Maidstone United	4 December 2018	
7 February 2019	MF	ENG	Ellis Chapman	Chesterfield	31 May 2019	
10 February 2019	MF	USA	Jordan Adebayo-Smith	Grantham Town	Work Experience Loan	

=== New contracts ===
Date from	Position	Nationality	Name	Length	Expiry	Ref.
24 April 2019	CB	ENG	Jason Shackell	1 years	June 2020	
24 April 2019	GK	ENG	Josh Vickers	1 years	June 2020	
24 April 2019	FW	ENG	Matt Rhead	1 years	June 2020	
19 May 2019	MF	NIR	Michael O’Connor	—	—	
29 June 2019	MF	USA	Jordan Adebayo-Smith	2 years	2021	

== Competitions ==
=== Friendlies ===
As of 7 June 2018, Lincoln City have announced six pre-season friendlies against Blackburn Rovers, Sheffield Wednesday, Lincoln United Boston United, Norwich City and Scunthorpe United

10 July 2018 Friendly	Lincoln City	1–3	Norwich City	Lincoln
19:45 BST	Raggett 86' (o.g.)	Report	McLean 41', 54'; Thompson 58'	Stadium: Sincil Bank; Attendance: 2,645

13 July 2018 Friendly	Lincoln City	0–1	Sheffield Wednesday	Lincoln
19:30 BST		Report	Forestieri 55'	Stadium: Sincil Bank; Attendance: 5,846

22 July 2018 Friendly	Lincoln City	0–1	Blackburn Rovers	Lincoln
15:00 BST		Report	Nuttall 43'	Stadium: Sincil Bank; Attendance: 3,275

24 July 2018 Friendly	Boston United	1–4	Lincoln City	Boston
19:45 BST	Wafula 8'	Report	Andrade 14', 90'; McCartan 62'; Anderson 74'	Stadium: The Jakemans Stadium; Attendance: 1,119; Referee: Darren Drysdale

28 July 2018 Friendly	Scunthorpe United	0–1	Lincoln City	Scunthorpe
15:00 BST			Wharton 79'	Stadium: Glanford Park

=== League Two ===
==== League table ====
Pos	Team	Pld	W	D	L	GF	GA	GD	Pts	Promotion, qualification or relegation
1	Lincoln City (C, P)	46	23	16	7	73	43	+30	85	Promotion to EFL League One
2	Bury (P)	46	22	13	11	82	56	+26	79	Promotion to EFL League One
3	Milton Keynes Dons (P)	46	23	10	13	71	49	+22	79	Promotion to EFL League One
4	Mansfield Town	46	20	16	10	69	41	+28	76	Qualification for League Two play-offs (Note: Four teams play for one spot and promotion to EFL League One.)
5	Forest Green Rovers	46	20	14	12	68	47	+21	74	Qualification for League Two play-offs

Source: EFL Official Website
Rules for classification: 1) Points; 2) Goal difference; 3) Number of goals scored; 4) Head-to-head results
(C) Champions; (P) Promoted

==== Results summary ====
Overall								Home						Away					
Pld	W	D	L	GF	GA	GD	Pts	W	D	L	GF	GA	GD	W	D	L	GF	GA	GD
46	23	16	7	73	43	+30	85	11	10	2	35	23	+12	12	6	5	38	20	+18

Last updated: 4 May 2019.

==== Results by matchday ====
Matchday	1	2	3	4	5	6	7	8	9	10	11	12	13	14	15	16	17	18	19	20	21	22	23	24	25	26	27	28	29	30	31	32	33	34	35	36	37	38	39	40	41	42	43	44	45	46
Ground	A	H	A	H	H	A	H	A	H	A	A	H	A	H	H	A	H	H	A	A	H	H	A	A	H	A	H	A	A	A	H	H	A	H	A	H	H	A	A	H	A	H	A	H	A	H
Result	W	W	D	W	W	W	L	W	W	W	L	W	W	D	D	L	W	D	D	W	W	W	L	W	D	D	W	W	D	D	D	D	W	D	W	W	W	D	W	D	W	D	L	D	L	L
Position	10	2	2	2	1	1	1	1	1	1	1	1	1	1	1	1	1	1	2	2	1	1	1	1	1	1	1	1	1	1	1	1	1	1	1	1	1	1	1	1	1	1	1	1	1	1

A = Away; H = Home; W = Win; D = Draw; L = Loss

==== Matches ====
4 August 2018 1	Northampton Town	0–1	Lincoln City	Northampton
15:00 BST		Report	Green 48'	Stadium: Sixfields Stadium; Attendance: 6,242; Referee: Lee Swabey

11 August 2018 2	Lincoln City	4–1	Swindon Town	Lincoln
15:00 BST	Akinde 10' (pen.); Bostwick 29'; Toffolo 80'; Green 82'	Report	Doughty 44' (pen.)	Stadium: Sincil Bank; Attendance: 8,405; Referee: Jon Machult

18 August 2018 3	Grimsby Town	1–1	Lincoln City	Cleethorpes
13:00 BST	Woolford 33'	Report	Akinde 71' (pen.)	Stadium: Blundell Park; Attendance: 7,201; Referee: Carl Boyeson

21 August 2018 4	Lincoln City	2–1	Bury	Lincoln
19:45 BST	Akinde 75' (pen.); Frecklington 82'	Report	O'Connell 31'	Stadium: Sincil Bank; Attendance: 8,016; Referee: Seb Stockbridge

25 August 2018 5	Lincoln City	3–1	Notts County	Lincoln
15:00 BST	Frecklington 7'; Andrade 33'; Anderson 55'	Report	Kellett 19'	Stadium: Sincil Bank; Attendance: 9,119; Referee: Scott Duncan

1 September 2018 6	Exeter City	0–3	Lincoln City	Exeter
15:00 BST		Report	Frecklington 43'; Akinde 45'; Brown 56' (o.g.)	Stadium: St James Park; Attendance: 4,067; Referee: Kevin Johnson

8 September 2018 7	Lincoln City	0–1	Crawley Town	Lincoln
15:00 BST		Report	Bostwick 45' (o.g.)	Stadium: Sincil Bank; Attendance: 8,321; Referee: Matt Donohue

15 September 2018 8	Macclesfield Town	1–2	Lincoln City	Macclesfield
15:00 BST	Grimes 83'	Report	Pett 21'; Shackell 87'	Stadium: Moss Rose; Attendance: 2,589; Referee: John Busby

22 September 2018 9	Lincoln City	2–1	Milton Keynes Dons	Lincoln
15:00 BST	MaCartan 72'; Shackell 90'	Report	Healey 64'	Stadium: Sincil Bank; Attendance: 9,322; Referee: Stuart Attwell

29 September 2018 10	Cheltenham Town	0–2	Lincoln City	Cheltenham
15:00 BST		Report	Alcock 74' (o.g.); McCartan 80'	Stadium: Whaddon Road; Attendance: 3,202; Referee: Dean Whitestone

2 October 2018 11	Tranmere Rovers	1–0	Lincoln City	Birkenhead
19:45 BST	Norwood 61'	Report		Stadium: Prenton Park; Attendance: 5,467; Referee: Andy Haines

6 October 2018 12	Lincoln City	1–0	Crewe Alexandra	Lincoln
15:00 BST	Pett 58'	Report		Stadium: Sincil Bank; Attendance: 8,718; Referee: Paul Marsden

13 October 2018 13	Port Vale	2–6	Lincoln City	Burslem
15:00 BST	Conlon 51'; Whitfield 90' (pen.)	Report	Anderson 3'; McCartan 38'; Legge 45' (o.g.); Bostwick 48'; Wharton 78'; Wilson 84'	Stadium: Vale Park; Attendance: 5,137; Referee: Brett Huxtable

20 October 2018 14	Lincoln City	1–1	Cambridge United	Lincoln
15:00 BST	Rhead 6'	Report	Brown 11'	Stadium: Sincil Bank; Attendance: 9,108; Referee: Lee Collins

23 October 2018 15	Lincoln City	2–2	Carlisle United	Lincoln
19:45 BST	O'Connor 13'; Andrade 44'	Report	Nadesan 6', 27'	Stadium: Sincil Bank; Attendance: 9,119; Referee: Neil Hair

27 October 2018 16	Colchester United	1–0	Lincoln City	Colchester
15:00 BST	Kent 28'	Report		Stadium: Colchester Community Stadium; Attendance: 4,962; Referee: David Coote

3 November 2018 17	Lincoln City	2–1	Forest Green Rovers	Lincoln
15:00 GMT	Akinde 8'; Gordon 72'	Report	Brown 12'	Stadium: Sincil Bank; Attendance: 8,542; Referee: Anthony Backhouse

24 November 2018 18	Lincoln City	1–1	Mansfield Town	Lincoln
13:00 GMT	Gordon 85'	Report	Mellis 90'	Stadium: Sincil Bank; Attendance: 9,773; Referee: Gavin Ward

27 November 2018 19	Oldham Athletic	1–1	Lincoln City	Oldham
19:45 GMT	Maouche 49'	Report	O'Connor 54'	Stadium: Boundary Park; Attendance: 3,597; Referee: Ben Toner

8 December 2018 20	Stevenage	0–1	Lincoln City	Stevenage
15:00 GMT		Report	Akinde 11' (pen.)	Stadium: Broadhall Way; Attendance: 3,522; Referee: Lee Collins

15 December 2018 21	Lincoln City	3–1	Morecambe	Lincoln
15:00 GMT	Anderson 7'; Akinde 33' (pen.); Shackell 37'	Report	Ellison 80'	Stadium: Sincil Bank; Attendance: 7,975; Referee: Seb Stockbridge

22 December 2018 22	Lincoln City	3–2	Newport County	Lincoln
15:00 GMT	Akinde 3'; Anderson 7'; Pett 67'	Report	Amond 45, 77'	Stadium: Sincil Bank; Attendance: 8,632; Referee: Thomas Bramall

26 December 2018 23	Crewe Alexandra	2–1	Lincoln City	Crewe
15:00 GMT	Porter 47'; Jones 72'	Report	Anderson 90'	Stadium: Gresty Road; Attendance: 4,440; Referee: Craig Sarginson

29 December 2018 24	Cambridge United	1–2	Lincoln City	Cambridge
15:00 GMT	Ibehre 28'	Report	Eardley 70'; Akinde 75'	Stadium: Abbey Stadium; Attendance: 6,858; Referee: Carl Boyeson

1 January 2019 25	Lincoln City	1–1	Port Vale	Lincoln
15:00 GMT	McCartan 58'	Report	Oyeleke 90'	Stadium: Sincil Bank; Attendance: 9,106; Referee: Peter Wright

12 January 2019 26	Swindon Town	2–2	Lincoln City	Swindon
15:00 GMT	Doughty 55' (pen.), 88'	Report	Shackell 39'; McCartan 45'	Stadium: County Ground; Attendance: 6,543; Referee: Ben Toner

19 January 2019 27	Lincoln City	1–0	Grimsby Town	Lincoln
13:00 GMT	Toffolo 12'	Report		Stadium: Sincil Bank; Attendance: 9,650; Referee: Mike Dean

22 January 2019 28	Yeovil Town	0–2	Lincoln City	Yeovil
19:45 GMT		Report	Rowe 27, 45'	Stadium: Huish Park; Attendance: 2,486; Referee: Ollie Yates

26 January 2019 29	Bury	3–3	Lincoln City	Bury
17:30 GMT	O'Shea 15'; Adams 42'; Aimsom 86'	Report	Rowe 9'; Stokes 27' (o.g.); Akinde 63' (pen.)	Stadium: Gigg Lane; Attendance: 5,169; Referee: Dean Whitestone

2 February 2019 30	Notts County	1–1	Lincoln City	Nottingham
15:00 GMT	Stead 2' (pen.)	Report	Andrade 45'	Stadium: Meadow Lane; Attendance: 10,641; Referee: Antony Coggins

9 February 2019 31	Lincoln City	1–1	Northampton Town	Lincoln
15:00 GMT	Andrade 27'	Report	Pierre 45'	Stadium: Sincil Bank; Attendance: 9,352; Referee: Michael Salisbury

16 February 2019 32	Lincoln City	2–2	Stevenage	Lincoln
15:00 GMT	Andrade 48, 71'	Report	Chair 87, 90'	Stadium: Sincil Bank; Attendance: 9,036; Referee: Jeremy Simpson

23 February 2019 33	Morecambe	0–2	Lincoln City	Morecambe
15:00 GMT		Report	Andrade 10, 57'	Stadium: Globe Arena; Attendance: 2,352; Referee: Martin Coy

26 February 2019 34	Lincoln City	1–1	Exeter City	Lincoln
19:45 GMT	Akinde 90'	Report	Jay 22'	Stadium: Sincil Bank; Attendance: 8,589; Referee: John Brooks

2 March 2019 35	Forest Green Rovers	1–2	Lincoln City	Nailsworth
15:00 GMT	Brown 7'	Report	Akinde 13, 79' (pen.)	Stadium: The New Lawn; Attendance: 3,165; Referee: Andy Davies

8 March 2019 36	Lincoln City	1–0	Yeovil Town	Lincoln
19:45 GMT	O'Hara 69'	Report		Stadium: Sincil Bank; Attendance: 9,014; Referee: Scott Oldham

12 March 2019 37	Lincoln City	2–0	Oldham Athletic	Lincoln
19:45 GMT	Toffolo 30'; Rowe 58'	Report		Stadium: Sincil Bank; Attendance: 8,454; Referee: Paul Marsden

18 March 2019 38	Mansfield Town	1–1	Lincoln City	Mansfield
19:45 GMT	Pearce 4'	Report	Akinde 75' (pen.)	Stadium: Field Mill; Attendance: 7,177; Referee: Graham Scott

23 March 2019 39	Crawley Town	0–3	Lincoln City	Crawley
15:00 GMT		Report	Andrade 37'; McCartan 76'; Bolger 85'	Stadium: Broadfield Stadium; Attendance: 3,335; Referee: Craig Hicks

30 March 2019 40	Lincoln City	1–1	Macclesfield Town	Lincoln
15:00 GMT	Eardley 38'	Report	Wilson 28'	Stadium: Sincil Bank; Attendance: 9,567; Referee: Brett Huxtable

6 April 2019 41	Milton Keynes Dons	0–2	Lincoln City	Milton Keynes
15:00 BST		Report	Akinde 34' (pen.); Andrade 90'	Stadium: Stadium MK; Attendance: 15,851; Referee: Kevin Johnson

13 April 2019 42	Lincoln City	1–1	Cheltenham Town	Lincoln
15:00 BST	McCartan 18'	Report	Lloyd 73'	Stadium: Sincil Bank; Attendance: 9,820; Referee: Nick Kinseley

19 April 2019 43	Carlisle United	1–0	Lincoln City	Carlisle
15:00 BST	Jones 76'	Report		Stadium: Brunton Park; Attendance: 6,819; Referee: Lee Mason

22 April 2019 44	Lincoln City	0–0	Tranmere Rovers	Lincoln
15:00 BST	Akinde (yellow card) 77'	Report	Norwood (yellow card) 88'	Stadium: Sincil Bank; Attendance: 9,658; Referee: Anthony Backhouse

27 April 2019 45	Newport County	1–0	Lincoln City	Newport
15:00 BST	Bennett 7'; Poole (yellow card) 42'	Report	Rhead (yellow card) 45'; Rowe (yellow card) 55'; Toffolo (yellow card) 55'; Bostwick (yellow card) 71'	Stadium: Rodney Parade; Attendance: 4,605; Referee: Kevin Johnson

4 May 2019 46	Lincoln City	0–3	Colchester United	Lincoln
12:30 BST	Bolger (yellow card) 32'; Akinde (yellow card) 68'	Report	Jackson (yellow card) 1'; Dickenson 22'; Saunders (yellow card) 24'; Szmodics 27', 44' (yellow card) 89'; Ross (yellow card) 90+5'	Stadium: Sincil Bank; Attendance: 9,832; Referee: Trevor Kettle

=== FA Cup ===
The first round draw was made live on BBC by Dennis Wise and Dion Dublin on 22 October. The draw for the second round was made live on BBC and BT by Mark Schwarzer and Glenn Murray on 12 November. The third round draw was made live on BBC by Ruud Gullit and Paul Ince from Stamford Bridge on 3 December 2018.

10 November 2018 First round	Lincoln City	3–2	Northampton Town	Lincoln
15:00 GMT	Anderson 16'; Pett 52'; Andrade 90+2'	Report	Bridge 55' van Veen 81'	Stadium: Sincil Bank; Attendance: 6,012; Referee: Graham Salisbury

1 December 2018 Second round	Lincoln City	2–0	Carlisle United	Lincoln
15:00 GMT	Rhead 1'; Akinde 86'	Report		Stadium: Sincil Bank; Attendance: 6,438; Referee: Dean Whitestone

5 January 2019 Third round	Everton	2–1	Lincoln City	Walton
15:00 GMT	Lookman 12'; Bernard 14'	Report	Bostwick 28'	Stadium: Goodison Park; Attendance: 37,900; Referee: John Brooks

=== EFL Cup ===
On 15 June 2018, the draw for the first round was made in Vietnam. The second round draw was made from the Stadium of Light on 16 August.

13 August 2018 First round	Port Vale	0–4	Lincoln City	Burslem
19:45 BST		Report	Shackell 5'; Green 48' (pen.); O'Connor 80'; Akinde 82'	Stadium: Vale Park; Attendance: 2,440; Referee: Robert Lewis

28 August 2018 Second round	Blackburn Rovers	4–1	Lincoln City	Blackburn
19:45 BST	Nuttall 4'; Graham 49'; Downing 61'; Palmer 77'	Report	Luque 28'	Stadium: Ewood Park; Attendance: 5,211; Referee: Geoff Eltringham

=== EFL Trophy ===
On 13 July 2018, the initial group stage draw bar the U21 invited clubs was announced. The draw for the second round was made live on Talksport by Leon Britton and Steve Claridge on 16 November.

Pos	Lge	Team	Pld	W	PW	PL	L	GF	GA	GD	Pts	Qualification
1	L2	Mansfield Town	3	3	0	0	0	7	4	+3	9	Round 2
2	L2	Lincoln City	3	0	1	1	1	4	5	−1	3	Round 2
3	L1	Scunthorpe United	3	0	1	1	1	3	4	−1	3	
4	ACA	Wolverhampton Wanderers U21	3	0	1	1	1	3	4	−1	3	

Source: EFL.com

4 September 2018 Group Game 1	Lincoln City	1–2	Mansfield Town	Lincoln
19:45 BST	Rhead 6'	Report	Butcher 8'; Walker 72'	Stadium: Sincil Bank; Attendance: 4,205; Referee: Ross Joyce

9 October 2018 Group Game 2	Scunthorpe United	1–1 (1–3 p)	Lincoln City	Scunthorpe
19:45 BST	Colclough 56'		Anderson 84'	Stadium: Glanford Park; Attendance: 1,878; Referee: Martin Coy
	Penalties
	Novak (penalty missed); Goode (penalty scored); Lund (penalty missed); Humphrys (penalty missed)		Pett (penalty scored); Rhead (penalty scored); Frecklington (penalty scored); Andrade (penalty missed)

6 November 2018 Group Game 3	Lincoln City	2–2 (4–5 p)	Wolverhampton Wanderers U21	Lincoln
19:45 GMT	Green 23', 42'	Report	Ashley-Seal 42'; Giles 45+3'	Stadium: Sincil Bank; Attendance: 2,723; Referee: Trevor Kettle
	Penalties
	Akinde (penalty scored); Rhead (penalty scored); Toffolo (penalty scored); Mensah (penalty missed); Andrade (penalty scored); Pett (penalty missed)		Watt (penalty scored); Pote (penalty scored); Giles (penalty missed); Ashley-Seal (penalty scored); Ennis (penalty scored); Iorfa (penalty scored)

4 December 2018 Second round	Accrington Stanley	2–2 (4–2 p)	Lincoln City	Accrington
19:45 GMT	Brown 8'; Clark 71'	Report	Green 7'; McCombe 61'	Stadium: Crown Ground; Attendance: 746
	Penalties
	Hall (penalty scored); Zanzala (penalty scored); McConville (penalty scored); Barlaser (penalty missed); Clark (penalty scored)		Gordon (penalty missed); Chapman (penalty scored); Green (penalty missed); Rhead (penalty scored)

== Squad statistics ==
=== Appearances ===
As of 4 May 2019

No.	Pos	Nat	Player	Total		League 2		FA Cup		League Cup		EFL Trophy	
No.	Pos	Nat	Player	Apps	Goals	Apps	Goals	Apps	Goals	Apps	Goals	Apps	Goals
1	GK	(England) ENG	Josh Vickers	21	0	18	0	3	0	0	0	0	0
4	MF	(Northern Ireland) NIR	Michael O’Connor	44	3	31+7	2	2+1	0	1+1	1	0+1	0
5	DF	(England) ENG	Jason Shackell	40	5	33+1	4	3	0	2	1	1	0
6	MF	(Scotland) SCO	Mark O'Hara	17	1	14+3	1	0	0	0	0	0	0
7	MF	(England) ENG	Tom Pett	51	4	33+11	3	3	1	1+1	0	2	0
8	MF	(Ireland) EIR	Lee Frecklington	29	4	23+3	4	2	0	0	0	0+1	0
9	FW	(England) ENG	Matt Rhead	43	3	12+22	1	1+2	1	2	0	4	1
10	FW	(England) ENG	Lee Angol	2	0	0+2	0	0	0	0	0	0	0
11	FW	(Portugal) POR	Bruno Andrade	50	11	39+3	10	3	1	0+2	0	0+3	0
12	MF	(England) ENG	Ellis Chapman	12	0	2+3	0	0+1	0	2	0	4	0
14	DF	(England) ENG	Harry Toffolo	52	3	46	3	3	0	1	0	1+1	0
15	DF	(Wales) WAL	James Wilson	15	1	4+7	1	1	0	2	0	1	0
16	MF	(England) ENG	Michael Bostwick	49	3	45	2	3	1	0	0	1	0
17	FW	(Northern Ireland) NIR	Shay McCartan	43	7	23+15	7	1+2	0	1	0	1	0
18	GK	(England) ENG	Matt Gilks	12	0	12	0	0	0	0	0	0	0
19	MF	(England) ENG	Danny Rowe	17	4	12+5	4	0	0	0	0	0	0
21	GK	(England) ENG	Grant Smith	17	0	16	0	0	0	1	0	0	0
23	DF	(Wales) WAL	Neal Eardley	47	2	43	2	2	0	1	0	1	0
24	DF	(Ireland) EIR	Cian Bolger	17	1	12+5	1	0	0	0	0	0	0
25	MF	(England) ENG	Jordan Roberts	5	0	0+5	0	0	0	0	0	0	0
26	MF	(England) ENG	Harry Anderson	51	7	39+4	5	3	1	2	0	3	1
27	DF	(England) ENG	Jamie McCombe	2	1	0	0	0	0	0	0	0+2	1
28	MF	(England) ENG	Tom Shaw	1	0	0	0	0	0	0	0	0+1	0
29	FW	(England) ENG	John Akinde	52	17	41+4	15	2+1	1	0+2	1	0+2	0
30	MF	(United States) USA	Jordan Adebayo-Smith	1	0	0	0	0	0	0	0	1	0
Players no longer at the club
2	DF	(England) ENG	Kellan Gordon	10	2	0+6	2	0	0	0	0	4	0
5	DF	(England) ENG	Luke Waterfall	1	0	1	0	0	0	0	0	0	0
6	DF	(England) ENG	Scott Wharton	15	1	4+6	1	0+1	0	1	0	3	0
10	FW	(England) ENG	Matt Green	25	6	2+16	2	1+1	0	2	1	3	3
18	FW	(England) ENG	Bernard Mensah	8	0	0+4	0	0	0	0	0	4	0
19	MF	(Spain) ESP	Joan Luque	4	1	0+1	0	0	0	1	1	2	0
20	DF	(England) ENG	Adam Crookes	5	0	0	0	0	0	1	0	4	0
24	GK	(England) ENG	Sam Slocombe	5	0	0	0	0	0	1	0	4	0
