= 2018–19 EFL Trophy =

Checkatrade Trophy

Tournament details
- Country: England; Wales
- Teams: 64

Final positions
- Champions: Portsmouth (1st title)
- Runners-up: Sunderland

Tournament statistics
- Matches played: 127
- Goals scored: 313 (2.46 per match)
- Attendance: 308,713 (2,431 per match)
- Top goal scorer: (England) Dom Telford Bury (7 goals)

The 2018–19 EFL Trophy, known as the Checkatrade Trophy for sponsorship reasons, was the 38th season in the history of the competition, a knock-out tournament for English football clubs in League One and League Two of the English football system, and also including 16 Premier League and Championship "Academy teams" with Category One status. 127 matches were played in total.

Lincoln City were the defending champions, but were eliminated in the second round by Accrington Stanley. Portsmouth won the competition for the first time, defeating Sunderland in front of an EFL Trophy record attendance in the final. The total attendance for the tournament was 308,713

== Participating clubs ==
- 48 clubs from League One and League Two.
- 16 invited Category One Academy teams.

Of the sixteen invited Category One academies, fourteen competed in the 2017–18 competition; only Arsenal and Wolverhampton Wanderers did not participate. Arsenal rejected an invitation to compete in each of the previous two tournaments, while Wolves were not invited to compete in 2017–18 competition after fielding a side in the 2016–17 edition.

Reading and Sunderland's academy sides missed out after participation in the previous two years; Sunderland's first team competed for the first time since the 1987–88 competition, however, following their relegation to League One. Barnsley and Burton Albion both returned to the competition after relegation; they last competed in the 2015–16 season, when Barnsley won the trophy.

Macclesfield Town competed for the first time since the 2011–12 edition, following their promotion from the National League. Fellow promoted side Tranmere Rovers returned after a four year hiatus.

Liverpool and Manchester United both rejected an invitation to compete for the third successive season.

	League One	League Two	Academies
Clubs	Accrington Stanley; AFC Wimbledon; Barnsley; Blackpool; Bradford City; Bristol Rovers; Burton Albion; Charlton Athletic; Coventry City; Doncaster Rovers; Fleetwood Town; Gillingham; Luton Town; Oxford United; Peterborough United; Plymouth Argyle; Portsmouth; Rochdale; Scunthorpe United; Shrewsbury Town; Southend United; Sunderland; Walsall; Wycombe Wanderers	Bury; Cambridge United; Carlisle United; Cheltenham Town; Colchester United; Crawley Town; Crewe Alexandra; Exeter City; Forest Green Rovers; Grimsby Town; Lincoln City; Macclesfield Town; Mansfield Town; Milton Keynes Dons; Morecambe; Newport County; Northampton Town; Notts County; Oldham Athletic; Port Vale; Stevenage; Swindon Town; Tranmere Rovers; Yeovil Town	Arsenal; Brighton & Hove Albion; Chelsea; Everton; Fulham; Leicester City; Manchester City; Middlesbrough; Newcastle United; Southampton; Stoke City; Swansea City; Tottenham Hotspur; West Bromwich Albion; West Ham United; Wolverhampton Wanderers
Total	24	24	16

== Eligibility criteria for players ==
For EFL Clubs

- Minimum of four qualifying outfield players in their starting XI. A qualifying outfield player will be one who meets any of the following requirements:
  - Any player who started the previous or following first-team fixture
  - Any player who is in the top 10 players at the club, who have made the most starting appearances in league and domestic cup competitions that season
  - Any player with 40 or more first-team appearances in their career
  - Any player on loan from a Premier League club or any EFL Category One Academy club.
- A club can play any eligible goalkeeper in the competition

For invited teams

- Minimum of six players in the starting line-up who played at under-21 level, as at 30 June 2018.
- Teams may only include two players on the team sheet, aged over 21, who have made forty or more senior appearances, as at 30 June 2018.
  - A senior appearance will be defined as having played in a professional first-team fixture. A non-playing substitute does not count.

== Competition format ==
Group stage

- Sixteen groups of 4 teams would be organised on a regionalised basis.
- All groups would include one invited club.
- All clubs would play each other once, either home or away (Academies play all group matches away from home).
- Clubs would be awarded three points for a win and one point for a draw.
- In the event of a drawn game (after 90 minutes), a penalty shootout would be held with the winning team earning an additional point.
- The top two teams would progress to the Knockout Stage.

Knockout stage

- Round 2 and 3 of the competition would be drawn on a regionalised basis.
- In Round 2, the group winners should be seeded and the group runners-up shall be unseeded in the draw.
- In Round 2, teams who played in the same group as each other in the group stage would be kept apart from each other.

== Group stage and Knockout rounds ==
=== Northern Section ===
==== Group A ====
Pos	Lge	Team	Pld	W	PW	PL	L	GF	GA	GD	Pts	Qualification
1	L1	Sunderland	3	2	1	0	0	4	1	+3	8	Round 2
2	ACA	Stoke City U21	3	1	1	1	0	3	2	+1	6	Round 2
3	L2	Carlisle United	3	1	0	1	1	5	6	−1	4	
4	L2	Morecambe	3	0	0	0	3	3	6	−3	0	

Source: EFL.com

4 September 2018	Carlisle United	3–2	Morecambe	Carlisle
19:45 BST	Glendon 13'; Gillesphey 38'; Yates 76'	Report	Oliver 6'; Piggott 24'	Stadium: Brunton Park; Attendance: 1,213; Referee: Andy Haines

4 September 2018	Sunderland	0–0 (4–2 p)	Stoke City U21	Sunderland
19:45 BST		Report		Stadium: Stadium of Light; Attendance: 7,644; Referee: Martin Coy
	Penalties
	Sinclair (penalty scored); McGeouch (penalty scored); O'Nien (penalty scored); Hume (penalty scored)		Campbell (penalty missed); Souttar (penalty missed); Sørensen (penalty scored); Szerető (penalty scored)

9 October 2018	Morecambe	1–2	Stoke City U21	Morecambe
19:45 BST	Oswell 26'	Report	Shenton 9'; Campbell 57'	Stadium: Globe Arena; Attendance: 512; Referee: Anthony Backhouse

9 October 2018	Sunderland	3–1	Carlisle United	Sunderland
19:45 BST	Kimpioka 3'; Robson 34'; Honeyman 63'	Report	Nadesan 22'	Stadium: Stadium of Light; Attendance: 8,112; Referee: Ben Toner

13 November 2018	Carlisle United	1–1 (4–5 p)	Stoke City U21	Carlisle
19:45 BST	Sowerby 23'	Report	Campbell 34'	Stadium: Brunton Park; Attendance: 882; Referee: Martin Coy
	Penalties
	Grainger (penalty scored); Yates (penalty scored); Jones (penalty missed); Nadesan (penalty scored); McCarron (penalty scored); Miller (penalty missed)		Dunwoody (penalty missed); Campbell (penalty scored); Thandi (penalty scored); Clucas (penalty scored); Jarvis (penalty scored); Shenton (penalty scored)

13 November 2018	Morecambe	0–1	Sunderland	Morecambe
19:45 BST		Report	Maja 90+1'	Stadium: Globe Arena; Attendance: 2,377; Referee: Paul Marsden

==== Group B ====
Pos	Lge	Team	Pld	W	PW	PL	L	GF	GA	GD	Pts	Qualification
1	L1	Rochdale	3	2	0	1	0	6	3	+3	7	Round 2
2	L2	Bury	3	2	0	0	1	6	4	+2	6	Round 2
3	ACA	Leicester City U21	3	0	2	0	1	5	6	−1	4	
4	L1	Fleetwood Town	3	0	0	1	2	3	7	−4	1	

Source: EFL.com

4 September 2018	Rochdale	2–1	Bury	Rochdale
19:45	Clough 16'; Matty Gillam 19'	Report	Lavery 70' (pen.)	Stadium: Spotland Stadium; Attendance: 1,582; Referee: Carl Boyeson

11 September 2018	Fleetwood Town	2–2 (6–7 p)	Leicester City U21	Fleetwood
19:45	Long 33'; McAleny 49'	Report	Loft 81', 90+6'	Stadium: Highbury Stadium; Attendance: 504; Referee: Peter Wright
	Penalties
	McAleny (penalty scored); G. Jones (penalty scored); Garner (penalty scored); Biggins (penalty scored); Clarke (penalty missed); Spurr (penalty scored); Sheron (penalty scored); Dempsey (penalty missed)		(penalty scored) Diabaté; (penalty scored) Choudhury; (penalty scored) Wright; (penalty scored) Dewsbury-Hall; (penalty missed) Knight; (penalty scored) Johnson; (penalty scored) Martis; (penalty scored) Loft

9 October 2018	Fleetwood Town	0–2	Rochdale	Fleetwood
19:45		Report	Williams 16'; Cannon 16'	Stadium: Highbury Stadium; Attendance: 669; Referee: Ross Joyce

16 October 2018	Bury	2–1	Leicester City U21	Bury, Greater Manchester
19:45	Telford 4', 67'	Report	Shade 21'	Stadium: Gigg Lane; Attendance: 454; Referee: Ollie Yates

7 November 2018	Rochdale	2–2 (3–4 p)	Leicester City U21	Rochdale
19:45	Andrew 6'; McNulty 17'	Report	Pașcanu 28'; Loft 66'	Stadium: Spotland Stadium; Attendance: 615; Referee: Thomas Bramall
	Penalties
	Clough (penalty missed); Perkins (penalty scored); Wilbraham (penalty scored); Hoti (penalty missed); Hopper (penalty scored); Williams (penalty missed)		(penalty missed) Johnson; (penalty scored) Dewsbury-Hall; (penalty scored) Pașcanu; (penalty scored) Thomas; (penalty missed) Loft; (penalty scored) Kaba Sherif

13 November 2018	Bury	3–1	Fleetwood Town	Bury, Greater Manchester
19:45	Telford 21' (pen.); Dagnall 32'; Adams 37'	Report	Dempsey 11'	Stadium: Gigg Lane; Attendance: 554; Referee: Anthony Backhouse

==== Group C ====
Pos	Lge	Team	Pld	W	PW	PL	L	GF	GA	GD	Pts	Qualification
1	L1	Accrington Stanley	3	2	0	0	1	8	5	+3	6	Round 2
2	L2	Macclesfield Town	3	1	1	0	1	6	8	−2	5	Round 2
3	L1	Blackpool	3	1	0	1	1	7	7	0	4	
4	ACA	West Bromwich Albion U21	3	1	0	0	2	4	5	−1	3	

Source: EFL.com

4 September 2018	Macclesfield Town	3–3 (5–3 p)	Blackpool	Macclesfield
19:45	Blissett 14'; Rose 35', 78' (pen.)	Report	31' Guy; 90' O'Sullivan; 90+4' O'Connor	Stadium: Moss Rose; Attendance: 639; Referee: Chris Sarginson
	Penalties
	Whitaker (penalty scored); Smith (penalty scored); Fitzpatrick (penalty scored); Wilson (penalty scored); Rose (penalty scored)		(penalty scored) Pritchard; (penalty scored) Taylor; (penalty scored) Heneghan; (penalty missed) Bola

9 October 2018	Accrington Stanley	4–1	Macclesfield Town	Accrington
19:45	Finley 35'; Zanzala 63'; Fitzpatrick 82' (o.g.); Barlaser 90+5'	Report	Vincenti 58'	Stadium: Crown Ground; Attendance: 900; Referee: Thomas Bramall

9 October 2018	Blackpool	1–2	West Bromwich Albion U21	Blackpool
19:45	Davies 45'	Report	Azaz 3'; Bradley 76'	Stadium: Bloomfield Road; Attendance: 717; Referee: Paul Marsden

6 November 2018	Accrington Stanley	2–1	West Bromwich Albion U21	Accrington
19:45	Clark 49'; Sykes 90+2'	Report	Leko 62'	Stadium: Crown Ground; Attendance: 772; Referee: Peter Wright

13 November 2018	Blackpool	3–2	Accrington Stanley	Blackpool
19:45	Dodoo 30', 41'; Gnanduillet 67'	Report	Hall 17', 90+1' (pen.)	Stadium: Bloomfield Road; Attendance: 781; Referee: Oliver Yates

13 November 2018	Macclesfield Town	2–1	West Bromwich Albion U21	Macclesfield
19:45	Stephens 19'; Arthur 24'	Report	Tulloch 14'	Stadium: Moss Rose; Attendance: 411; Referee: Scott Oldham

==== Group D ====
Pos	Lge	Team	Pld	W	PW	PL	L	GF	GA	GD	Pts	Qualification
1	L1	Shrewsbury Town	3	2	1	0	0	9	2	+7	8	Round 2
2	ACA	Manchester City U21	3	2	0	1	0	6	2	+4	7	Round 2
3	L2	Crewe Alexandra	3	1	0	0	2	6	9	−3	3	
4	L2	Tranmere Rovers	3	0	0	0	3	3	11	−8	0	

Source: EFL.com

28 August 2018	Shrewsbury Town	1–1 (3–1 p)	Manchester City U21	Shrewsbury
19:00	Angol 51'	Report	Touaizi 90+2'	Stadium: New Meadow; Attendance: 1,838; Referee: Paul Marsden
	Penalties
	Okenabirhie (penalty missed); John-Lewis (penalty scored); Loft (penalty missed); Norburn (penalty scored); Colkett (penalty scored)		(penalty missed) Touaizi; (penalty missed) Bernabé; (penalty scored) Matondo; (penalty missed) Dele-Bashiru

4 September 2018	Tranmere Rovers	3–4	Crewe Alexandra	Birkenhead
19:45	Harris 45+4'; Stockton 45+10'; Mullin 46'	Report	Porter 20', 85'; Nicholls 73'; Jones 86'	Stadium: Prenton Park; Attendance: 2,174; Referee: Graham Salisbury

25 September 2018	Crewe Alexandra	1–4	Manchester City U21	Crewe
19:30	Nicholls 51'	Report	Dele-Bashiru 2'; Gonzalez 22'; Richards 78' (pen.); Ogunby 90'	Stadium: Gresty Road; Attendance: 810

9 October 2018	Shrewsbury Town	6–0	Tranmere Rovers	Shrewsbury
19:00	John-Lewis 11'; Docherty 18'; Beckles 23'; Okenabirhie 56', 74', 90+1'	Report		Stadium: New Meadow; Attendance: 1,379

30 October 2018	Tranmere Rovers	0–1	Manchester City U21	Birkenhead
19:00		Report	Matondo 49'	Stadium: Prenton Park; Attendance: 747

13 November 2018	Crewe Alexandra	1–2	Shrewsbury Town	Crewe
19:30	Bowery 79'	Report	Eisa 20'; Gilliead 63'	Stadium: Gresty Road; Attendance: 823

==== Group E ====
Pos	Lge	Team	Pld	W	PW	PL	L	GF	GA	GD	Pts	Qualification
1	L2	Port Vale	3	3	0	0	0	5	1	+4	9	Round 2
2	L1	Walsall	3	2	0	0	1	6	4	+2	6	Round 2
3	ACA	Middlesbrough U21	3	1	0	0	2	2	5	−3	3	
4	L1	Burton Albion	3	0	0	0	3	1	4	−3	0	

Source: EFL.com

4 September 2018	Burton Albion	1–2	Walsall	Burton upon Trent
19:45	Myers-Harness 89'	Report	Morris 9'; Gordon 28'	Stadium: Pirelli Stadium; Attendance: 724; Referee: Rob Lewis

9 October 2018	Walsall	3–1	Middlesbrough U21	Walsall
19:00	Fitzwater 26'; Kouhyar 31'; Cook 89'	Report	Ward 67'	Stadium: Bescot Stadium; Attendance: 702

9 October 2018	Port Vale	1–0	Burton Albion	Stoke-on-Trent
19:45	Miller 65'			Stadium: Vale Park; Attendance: 601

16 October 2018	Port Vale	2–0	Middlesbrough U21	Stoke-on-Trent
19:45	Miller 6'; Rawlinson 66'	Report		Stadium: Vale Park; Attendance: 554

7 November 2018	Burton Albion	0–1	Middlesbrough U21	Burton upon Trent
19:00		Report	Hackney 87'	Stadium: Pirelli Stadium; Attendance: 202

13 November 2018	Walsall	1–2	Port Vale	Walsall
19:00	Johnson 45+1'	Report	Quigley 4'; Pugh 65'	Stadium: Bescot Stadium; Attendance: 878

==== Group F ====
Pos	Lge	Team	Pld	W	PW	PL	L	GF	GA	GD	Pts	Qualification
1	L1	Barnsley	3	2	1	0	0	5	3	+2	8	Round 2
2	L2	Oldham Athletic	3	2	0	0	1	8	5	+3	6	Round 2
3	ACA	Everton U21	3	0	0	2	1	4	5	−1	2	
4	L1	Bradford City	3	0	1	0	2	3	7	−4	2	

Source: EFL.com

4 September 2018	Oldham Athletic	1–2	Barnsley	Oldham
19:30	Surridge 31'	Report	Adeboyejo 44'; Moncur 82'	Stadium: Boundary Park; Attendance: 1,786; Referee: Seb Stockbridge

25 September 2018	Bradford City	1–1 (6–5 p)	Everton U21	Bradford
19:30	Miller 90+2'		Sambou 79'	Stadium: Valley Parade; Attendance: 902; Referee: Paul Marsden
	Penalties
	Ball (penalty scored); Gibson (penalty scored); O'Brien (penalty scored); Payne (penalty scored); Miller (penalty scored); Goldthorp (penalty scored)		(penalty scored) Lavery; (penalty scored) Charsley; (penalty scored) Adeniran; (penalty scored) Foulds; (penalty scored) Sambou; (penalty missed) Mampala

9 October 2018	Bradford City	1–4	Oldham Athletic	Bradford
19:30	Brünker 49'		Lang 10'; Maouche 26'; Surridge 57', 77'	Stadium: Valley Parade; Attendance: 1,015; Referee: Seb Stockbridge

30 October 2018	Oldham Athletic	3–2	Everton U21	Oldham
19:30	Clarke 53'; Miller 57'; Benteke 80'	Report	Markelo 6'; Lavery 24'	Stadium: Boundary Park; Attendance: 1,004; Referee: Darren Drysdale

6 November 2018	Barnsley	1–1 (4–2 p)	Everton U21	Barnsley
19:30	Hedges 40'	Report	Sambou 53'	Stadium: Oakwell; Attendance: 2,300; Referee: Matthew Donohue
	Penalties
	Moncur (penalty scored); Brown (penalty scored); Bähre (penalty scored); Thiam (penalty scored)		(penalty scored) Adeniran; (penalty missed) Mathis; (penalty scored) Kiersey; (penalty missed) Lavery

13 November 2018	Barnsley	2–1	Bradford City	Barnsley
19:30	Moncur 28', 64'; Jackson (red card) 77'	Report	Ball 8'	Stadium: Oakwell; Attendance: 2,925

==== Group G ====
Pos	Lge	Team	Pld	W	PW	PL	L	GF	GA	GD	Pts	Qualification
1	ACA	Newcastle United U21	3	3	0	0	0	8	3	+5	9	Round 2
2	L2	Notts County	3	1	0	0	2	5	6	−1	3	Round 2
3	L1	Doncaster Rovers	3	1	0	0	2	5	7	−2	3	
4	L2	Grimsby Town	3	1	0	0	2	4	6	−2	3	

Source: EFL.com

4 September 2018	Doncaster Rovers	1–3	Newcastle United U21	Keepmoat Stadium
19:00	Marquis 45+7'	Report	Allan 14'; Roberts 65'; Sørensen 86'	Attendance: 1,544; Referee: Matt Donohue

4 September 2018	Grimsby Town	2–1	Notts County	Blundell Park
19:45	M. Rose 69' (pen.); Hessenthaler 88'	Report	Alessandra 12'	Attendance: 746; Referee: Tom Nield

9 October 2018	Doncaster Rovers	2–0	Grimsby Town	Keepmoat Stadium
19:30	May 23', 57' (pen.)			Attendance: 1,420; Referee: Michael Salisbury

9 October 2018	Notts County	0–2	Newcastle United U21	Meadow Lane
19:45			Roberts 10' (pen.); Sørensen 56'	Attendance: 1,139

13 November 2018	Grimsby Town	2–3	Newcastle United U21	Blundell Park
19:45	Hooper 9'; Cook 54'		Roberts 19'; Sørensen 26'; Longstaff 78'	Attendance: 547

14 November 2018	Notts County	4–2	Doncaster Rovers	Meadow Lane
19:45	Dennis 15', 40', 64' (pen.); Boldewijn 26'		May 50', 70'	Attendance: 915

==== Group H ====
Pos	Lge	Team	Pld	W	PW	PL	L	GF	GA	GD	Pts	Qualification
1	L2	Mansfield Town	3	3	0	0	0	7	4	+3	9	Round 2
2	L2	Lincoln City	3	0	1	1	1	4	5	−1	3	Round 2
3	L1	Scunthorpe United	3	0	1	1	1	3	4	−1	3	
4	ACA	Wolverhampton Wanderers U21	3	0	1	1	1	3	4	−1	3	

Source: EFL.com

4 September 2018	Lincoln City	1–2	Mansfield Town	Sincil Bank
19:45	Rhead 6'		Butcher 8'; Walker 72'	Attendance: 4,205

4 September 2018	Scunthorpe United	0–0 (4–2 p)	Wolverhampton Wanderers U21	Glanford Park
19:45				Attendance: 874
	Penalties
	Goode (penalty missed); Lund (penalty scored); Colclough (penalty scored); Horsfield (penalty scored); Burgess (penalty scored)		(penalty missed) Pote; (penalty missed) Diallo; (penalty scored) Ennis; (penalty scored) Kilman

9 October 2018	Mansfield Town	2–1	Wolverhampton Wanderers U21	Field Mill
19:45	Mellis 4'; Benning 47'		Pedro Gonçalves 75'	Attendance: 1,112

9 October 2018	Scunthorpe United	1–1 (1–3 p)	Lincoln City	Glanford Park
19:45	Colclough 56'		Anderson 84'; Wilson (red card) 90+2'	Attendance: 1,878
	Penalties
	Novak (penalty missed); Goode (penalty scored); Lund (penalty missed); Humphrys (penalty missed)		Pett (penalty scored); Rhead (penalty scored); Frecklington (penalty scored); Andrade (penalty missed)

6 November 2018	Lincoln City	2–2 (4–5 p)	Wolverhampton Wanderers U21	Sincil Bank
19:45	Green 23', 42'	Report	Ashley-Seal 42'; Giles 45+3'	Attendance: 2,723
	Penalties
	Akinde (penalty scored); Rhead (penalty scored); Toffolo (penalty scored); Mensah (penalty missed); Andrade (penalty scored); Pett (penalty missed)		(penalty scored) Watt; (penalty scored) Pote; (penalty missed) Giles; (penalty scored) Ashley-Seal; (penalty scored) Ennis; (penalty scored) Iorfa

13 November 2018	Mansfield Town	3–2	Scunthorpe United	Field Mill
19:45	Blake 21'; Butcher 55'; Elsnik 90'		El-Mhanni 75'; Dales 90'	Attendance: 928

=== Southern Section ===
==== Group A ====
Pos	Lge	Team	Pld	W	PW	PL	L	GF	GA	GD	Pts	Qualification
1	L1	Portsmouth	3	3	0	0	0	8	2	+6	9	Round 2
2	ACA	Tottenham Hotspur U21	3	1	0	1	1	7	4	+3	4	Round 2
3	L1	Gillingham	3	1	0	0	2	2	9	−7	3	
4	L2	Crawley Town	3	0	1	0	2	2	4	−2	2	

Source: EFL.com

4 September 2018	Crawley Town	1–1 (5–3 p)	Tottenham Hotspur U21	Crawley
19:45	N'Gala 59'	Report	Harrison 49'	Stadium: Broadfield Stadium; Attendance: 1,403; Referee: Tim Robinson
	Penalties
	Young (penalty scored); Poleon (penalty scored); Randall (penalty scored); Palmer (penalty scored); Sesay (penalty scored)		(penalty scored) Binks; (penalty scored) Roles; (penalty scored) Bowden; (penalty missed) Maghoma

4 September 2018	Portsmouth	4–0	Gillingham	Portsmouth
19:45	Clarke 41'; Close 43'; Pitman 55' (pen.); Wheeler 90+1'	Report		Stadium: Fratton Park; Attendance: 2,011; Referee: Alan Young

9 October 2018	Crawley Town	0–1	Portsmouth	Crawley
19:45		Report	Donohue 37'	Stadium: Broadfield Stadium; Attendance: 1,268; Referee: Gavin Ward

9 October 2018	Gillingham	0–4	Tottenham Hotspur U21	Charlton, London
19:45		Report	Roles 44'; Maghoma 57'; Brown 83'; Duncan 90+3' (pen.)	Stadium: The Valley; Attendance: 308; Referee: Anthony Coggins

13 November 2018	Gillingham	2–1	Crawley Town	Gillingham
19:45	List 59'; Stevenson 88'	Report	Poleon 18'	Stadium: Priestfield Stadium; Attendance: 473; Referee: Darren Drysdale

13 November 2018	Portsmouth	3–2	Tottenham Hotspur U21	Portsmouth
19:45	Green 50'; Evans 69'; Hawkins 81'	Report	Patterson 20'; White 90'	Stadium: Fratton Park; Attendance: 3,138; Referee: James Linington

==== Group B ====
Pos	Lge	Team	Pld	W	PW	PL	L	GF	GA	GD	Pts	Qualification
1	L2	Cambridge United	3	2	0	0	1	8	4	+4	6	Round 2
2	L1	Southend United	3	2	0	0	1	6	3	+3	6	Round 2
3	L2	Colchester United	3	1	0	0	2	3	5	−2	3	
4	ACA	Southampton U21	3	1	0	0	2	2	7	−5	3	

Source: EFL.com

4 September 2018	Colchester United	0–2	Southampton U21	Colchester Community Stadium
19:45			Barnes 26'; Obafemi 90+4'	Attendance: 532; Referee: Charles Breakspear

4 September 2018	Southend United	3–1	Cambridge United	Roots Hall
19:45	McCoulsky 55', 64'; Hutchinson 87'		Lambe 53'	Attendance: 1,421; Referee: Gavin Ward

9 October 2018	Cambridge United	4–0	Southampton U21	Abbey Stadium
19:00	Azeez 16' (pen.), 37', 88'; Brown 50'			Attendance: 469; Referee: Trevor Kettle

9 October 2018	Colchester United	2–0	Southend United	Colchester Community Stadium
19:45	Kent 39'; Collins 49'			Attendance: 1,516; Referee: Roger East

13 November 2018	Cambridge United	3–1	Colchester United	Abbey Stadium
19:00	Azeez 32', 81'; Osadebe 90+3'		Pell 90+2'	Attendance: 598; Referee: Anthony Coggins

14 November 2018	Southend United	3–0	Southampton U21	Roots Hall
19:45	Bunn 12'; Kyprianou 17'; Bwomono 24'			Attendance: 983; Referee: John Busby

==== Group C ====
Pos	Lge	Team	Pld	W	PW	PL	L	GF	GA	GD	Pts	Qualification
1	ACA	Chelsea U21	3	2	0	0	1	9	3	+6	6	Round 2
2	L2	Newport County	3	2	0	0	1	5	1	+4	6	Round 2
3	L2	Swindon Town	3	2	0	0	1	4	4	0	6	
4	L1	Plymouth Argyle	3	0	0	0	3	0	10	−10	0	

Source: EFL.com

7 August 2018	Swindon Town	0–4	Chelsea U21	Swindon
19:45			Brown 16', 58'; Musonda 30' (pen.); Ugbo 89'	Stadium: County Ground; Attendance: 1,569; Referee: Brett Huxtable

11 September 2018	Swindon Town	1–0	Newport County	Swindon
19:45	Doughty 77' (pen.)			Stadium: County Ground; Attendance: 1,301; Referee: Anthony Coggins

25 September 2018	Newport County	3–0	Chelsea U21	Newport
19:45	Matt 36', 46'; Semenyo 90+1'			Stadium: Rodney Parade; Attendance: 1,525; Referee: Kevin Johnson

9 October 2018	Plymouth Argyle	0–3	Swindon Town	Plymouth
19:30			Richards 16'; Anderson 38'; Woolery 82'	Stadium: Home Park; Attendance: 1,906; Referee: Brett Huxtable

30 October 2018	Plymouth Argyle	0–5	Chelsea U21	Plymouth
19:30			Brown 20'; Songo'o 37' (o.g.); Taylor-Crossdale 74'; Anjorin 86'; Redan 89'	Stadium: Home Park; Attendance: 1,504; Referee: Anthony Coggins

13 November 2018	Newport County	2–0	Plymouth Argyle	Newport
19:45	Semenyo 35'; Harris 45'			Stadium: Rodney Parade; Attendance: 962; Referee: Brett Huxtable

==== Group D ====
Pos	Lge	Team	Pld	W	PW	PL	L	GF	GA	GD	Pts	Qualification
1	L2	Exeter City	3	2	1	0	0	4	0	+4	8	Round 2
2	L1	Bristol Rovers	3	2	0	0	1	4	2	+2	6	Round 2
3	L2	Yeovil Town	3	1	0	1	1	4	2	+2	4	
4	ACA	West Ham United U21	3	0	0	0	3	0	8	−8	0	

Source: EFL.com

4 September 2018	Yeovil Town	0–0 (3–4 p)	Exeter City	Yeovil
19:45 BST		Report		Stadium: Huish Park; Attendance: 1,518; Referee: Trevor Kettle
	Penalties
	Jaiyesimi (penalty scored); Olomola (penalty scored); Dickinson (penalty scored); Pattison (penalty missed); Patrick (penalty missed)		(penalty scored) Jay; (penalty scored) Collins; (penalty missed) Ogbene; (penalty scored) Abrahams; (penalty scored) Sparkes

18 September 2018	Bristol Rovers	2–0	West Ham United U21	Bristol
19:45 BST	Jakubiak 57'; Lockyer 82'			Stadium: Memorial Stadium; Attendance: 1,021

25 September 2018	Exeter City	2–0	West Ham United U21	Exeter
19:45 BST	Forte 20', 30'			Stadium: St James Park; Attendance: 1,114; Referee: Brett Huxtable

9 October 2018	Bristol Rovers	2–0	Yeovil Town	Bristol
19:45 BST	Jakubiak 50'; Rodman 85'			Stadium: Memorial Stadium; Attendance: 1,179

6 November 2018	Yeovil Town	4–0	West Ham United U21	Yeovil
19:45 GMT	Johnson 11' (o.g.); Akinola 48' (o.g.); James 65'; Mahmoutovic 83'	Report		Stadium: Huish Park; Attendance: 720; Referee: Brett Huxtable

13 November 2018	Exeter City	2–0	Bristol Rovers	Exeter
19:45 GMT	Forte 50'; Randall 81'			Stadium: St James Park; Attendance: 873

==== Group E ====
Pos	Lge	Team	Pld	W	PW	PL	L	GF	GA	GD	Pts	Qualification
1	L2	Cheltenham Town	3	2	0	0	1	8	6	+2	6	Round 2
2	ACA	Arsenal U21	3	2	0	0	1	8	7	+1	6	Round 2
3	L2	Forest Green Rovers	3	1	0	1	1	6	4	+2	4	
4	L1	Coventry City	3	0	1	0	2	1	6	−5	2	

Source: EFL.com

4 September 2018	Forest Green Rovers	4–0	Cheltenham Town	Nailsworth
19:30 BST	Grubb 14'; Campbell 48'; Williams 85'; Pearce 90'	Report		Stadium: The New Lawn; Attendance: 1,074; Referee: Lee Swabey

12 September 2018	Coventry City	0–3	Arsenal U21	Coventry
19:45		Report	Smith Rowe 4'; Nketiah 77'; Willock 90'	Stadium: Ricoh Arena; Attendance: 2,375

9 October 2018	Coventry City	1–1 (4–2 p)	Forest Green Rovers	Coventry
19:45	Hiwula 3'	Report	Pearce 68'	Stadium: Ricoh Arena; Attendance: 1,341
	Penalties
	Hiwula (penalty missed); Bakayoko (penalty scored); Camwell (penalty scored); Kelly (penalty scored); Hyam (penalty scored)		(penalty missed) Worthington; (penalty missed) Williams; (penalty scored) Grubb; (penalty scored) Archibald

30 October 2018	Cheltenham Town	6–2	Arsenal U21	Cheltenham
19:45	Clements 8'; Boyle 32'; Maddox 48', 50'; Mooney 84'; Broom 90'	Report	Burton (red card) 7'; John-Jules 35'; Gilmour 62' (pen.)	Stadium: Whaddon Road; Attendance: 1,431

7 November 2018	Forest Green Rovers	1–3	Arsenal U21	Nailsworth
19:00	Grubb 62'	Report	Willock 39' (pen.), 42'; John-Jules 85'	Stadium: The New Lawn; Attendance: 1,602

13 November 2018	Cheltenham Town	2–0	Coventry City	Cheltenham
19:45	Maddox 33'; Boyle 48'			Stadium: Whaddon Road; Attendance: 1,296

==== Group F ====
Pos	Lge	Team	Pld	W	PW	PL	L	GF	GA	GD	Pts	Qualification
1	L1	Oxford United (Q)	3	2	0	0	1	7	2	+5	6	Round 2
2	L2	Northampton Town (Q)	3	2	0	0	1	4	2	+2	6	Round 2
3	L1	Wycombe Wanderers (E)	3	2	0	0	1	3	4	−1	6	
4	ACA	Fulham U21 (E)	3	0	0	0	3	1	7	−6	0	

First match(es) will be played: 4 September 2018. Source: EFL.com
(E) Eliminated; (Q) Qualified to the phase indicated

4 September 2018	Northampton Town	0–1	Wycombe Wanderers	Sixfields Stadium
19:45		Report	Kashket 11'	Attendance: 1,053

4 September 2018	Oxford United	3–0	Fulham U21	Kassam Stadium
19:45	Smith 31'; Holmes 58'; Spasov 58' (pen.)		Stahl (red card) 50'	Attendance: 1,116

18 September 2018	Wycombe Wanderers	2–1	Fulham U21	High Wycombe
19:45	Samuel 3'; Kashket 90+4'	Report	Thompson 54'	Stadium: Adams Park; Attendance: 595

9 October 2018	Oxford United	1–2	Northampton Town	Kassam Stadium
19:45	Henry 24'		Van Veen 55'; Pierre 65'; O'Toole (red card) 90'	Attendance: 929

6 November 2018	Northampton Town	2–0	Fulham U21	Sixfields Stadium
19:45	Pierre 17'; Hoskins 20'			Attendance: 1,059

6 November 2018	Wycombe Wanderers	0–3	Oxford United	High Wycombe
19:45		Report	Brannagan 1'; Browne 31'; Smith 53'	Stadium: Adams Park; Attendance: 1,313

==== Group G ====
Pos	Lge	Team	Pld	W	PW	PL	L	GF	GA	GD	Pts	Qualification
1	ACA	Swansea City U21 (Q)	3	2	0	0	1	2	5	−3	6	Round 2
2	L1	AFC Wimbledon (Q)	3	1	1	0	1	6	3	+3	5	Round 2
3	L1	Charlton Athletic (E)	3	1	0	1	1	10	3	+7	4	
4	L2	Stevenage (E)	3	1	0	0	2	5	12	−7	3	

First match(es) will be played: 4 September 2018. Source: EFL.com
(E) Eliminated; (Q) Qualified to the phase indicated

28 August 2018	Stevenage	5–0	Swansea City U21	Stevenage
19:45	Kennedy 44' (pen.), 45+1'; Guthrie 69' (pen.), 81', 90+1'	Report		Stadium: Broadhall Way; Attendance: 470; Referee: Kevin Johnson

4 September 2018	Charlton Athletic	2–2 (2–4 p)	AFC Wimbledon	Charlton
19:45 BST	Sarr 43'; Mascoll 84'	Report	Hartigan 27'; Soares 49'	Stadium: The Valley; Attendance: 1,244; Referee: K. Johnson
	Penalties
	Ajose (penalty missed); Morgan (penalty scored); Lapslie (penalty missed); Hackett-Fairchild (penalty scored)		Appiah (penalty scored); Hartigan (penalty scored); Pinnock (penalty scored); Hanson (penalty scored)

18 September 2018	AFC Wimbledon	0–1	Swansea City U21	Kingston upon Thames
19:45		Report	Lewis 90'	Stadium: Kingsmeadow; Attendance: 306

9 October 2018	Stevenage	0–8	Charlton Athletic	Stevenage
19:45 BST		Report	Pratley 25'; Stevenson 27', 59', 74' (pen.); Ajose 34'; Vetokele 48', 58'; Lapslie 87'	Stadium: Broadhall Way; Attendance: 793; Referee: L. Swabey

6 November 2018	AFC Wimbledon	4–0	Stevenage	Kingston upon Thames
19:45	Appiah 1'; Wordsworth 28'; Garratt 68'; Egan 79'	Report		Stadium: Kingsmeadow; Attendance: 304; Referee: Gavin Ward

13 November 2018	Charlton Athletic	0–1	Swansea City U21	Charlton
19:45 GMT		Report	Marić 55'	Stadium: The Valley; Attendance: 740; Referee: C. Breakspear

==== Group H ====
Pos	Lge	Team	Pld	W	PW	PL	L	GF	GA	GD	Pts	Qualification
1	L1	Luton Town	3	2	0	0	1	6	3	+3	6	Round 2
2	L1	Peterborough United	3	1	0	2	0	7	6	+1	5	Round 2
3	ACA	Brighton & Hove Albion U21	3	1	1	0	1	6	6	0	5	
4	L2	Milton Keynes Dons	3	0	1	0	2	5	9	−4	2	

Source: Sky Sports

4 September 2018	Luton Town	2–1	Brighton & Hove Albion U21	Kenilworth Road
19:45	Jarvis 5'; Grant 79'	Report	Connolly 86'	Attendance: 1,318; Referee: John Busby

4 September 2018	Milton Keynes Dons	3–3 (6–5 p)	Peterborough United	Stadium MK
19:45	Aneke 6', 45+1'; Healey 33'	Report	Cooper 56'; Walker 87'; Godden 90'	Attendance: 2,404; Referee: Brett Huxtable

9 October 2018	Luton Town	3–0	Milton Keynes Dons	Kenilworth Road
19:45	Sheehan 17'; Lualua 29'; Grant 60'			Attendance: 875 (208 away); Referee: Craig Hicks

9 October 2018	Peterborough United	2–2 (4–5 p)	Brighton & Hove Albion U21	ABAX Stadium
19:45	Godden 29'; Cummings 52'	Report	Connolly 71'; J. Davies 80'	Attendance: 1,872
	Penalties
	Godden (penalty missed); Toney (penalty scored); Ward (penalty scored); Reed (penalty scored); Dembélé (penalty scored)		(penalty scored) J. Davies; (penalty scored) Gyökeres; (penalty scored) Normann; (penalty scored) White; (penalty scored) Connolly

13 November 2018	Milton Keynes Dons	2–3	Brighton & Hove Albion U21	Stadium MK
19:45	Agard 6'; Hancox 41'		Connolly 23', 69', 76'	Attendance: 1,018 (63 Away)

13 November 2018	Peterborough United	2–1	Luton Town	ABAX Stadium
19:45	Daniel 19'; Toney 36'		O'Malley 73' (o.g.)	Attendance: 2,107; Referee: Andy Woolmer

Knockout Stage

=== Round 2 ===
The round 2 draw took place on 16 November with ties due to be played from the week beginning 3 December. Teams were drawn in a regionalised format, with the proviso that no teams from the same Group Stage group can meet. To ensure this, group winners from groups A to D were drawn against group runners-up from groups E to H in the same section, and vice versa. Teams listed 1st are at home and won their group in Round 1.

If scores are level after 90 minutes in Rounds 2, 3, and 4, the game will be determined by the taking of penalties.

==== Northern Section ====
4 December 2018	Newcastle United U21 (ACA)	1–1 (5–3 p)	Macclesfield Town (L2)	Newcastle upon Tyne
19:00 GMT	Sørensen 23'		Wilson 84'	Stadium: St James' Park; Attendance: 1,126; Referee: Ben Toner
	Penalties
	Bailey (penalty scored); Roberts (penalty scored); Gibson (penalty scored); Watts (penalty scored); Sangare (penalty scored)		Smith (penalty scored); Stephens (penalty missed); Lowe (penalty scored); Wilson (penalty scored)

4 December 2018	Barnsley (L1)	3–3 (3–5 p)	Manchester City U21 (ACA)	Barnsley
19:30 GMT	Adeboyejo 17'; Williams 61'; Lindsay 65'		Matondo 45+2'; Poveda 59', 74'	Stadium: Oakwell; Attendance: 3,070; Referee: Oliver Yates
	Penalties
	Moore (penalty scored); Mowatt (penalty scored); Thiam (penalty missed); Brown (penalty scored)		Sandler (penalty scored); Richards (penalty scored); Matondo (penalty scored); Poveda (penalty scored); Pozo (penalty scored)

4 December 2018	Accrington Stanley (L1)	2–2 (4–2 p)	Lincoln City (L2)	Accrington
19:45 GMT	Brown 8'; Clark 71'		Green 7'; McCombe 61'	Stadium: Wham Stadium; Attendance: 746 (154 away); Referee: Anthony Backhouse
	Penalties
	Hall (penalty scored); Zanzala (penalty scored); McConville (penalty scored); Barlaser (penalty missed); Clark (penalty scored)		Gordon (penalty missed); Chapman (penalty scored); Green (penalty missed); Rhead (penalty scored)

4 December 2018	Mansfield Town (L2)	0–1	Bury (L2)	Mansfield
19:45 GMT			Telford 35'; Dawson (red card) 85'	Stadium: One Call Stadium; Attendance: 1,029 (27 away); Referee: Robert Lewis

4 December 2018	Port Vale (L2)	4–0	Stoke City U21 (ACA)	Stoke-on-Trent
19:45 GMT	Pope 6'; Montaño 40', 42'; Hannant 66'			Stadium: Vale Park; Attendance: 7,940; Referee: Seb Stockbridge

4 December 2018	Sunderland (L1)	2–0	Notts County (L2)	Sunderland
19:45 GMT	Jones 22' (o.g.); Sinclair 73' (pen.)	Report		Stadium: Stadium of Light; Attendance: 8,580; Referee: Graham Salisbury

11 December 2018	Rochdale (L1)	2–0	Oldham Athletic (L2)	Rochdale
19:00 GMT	Rafferty 90+2' (pen.); Adshead 90+3'		Maouche (red card) 51'	Stadium: Spotland Stadium; Attendance: 1,854; Referee: Oliver Langford

5 December 2018	Shrewsbury Town (L1)	2–1	Walsall (L1)	Shrewsbury
19:45 GMT	Gillied 24'; Loft 72'			Stadium: New Meadow; Attendance: 1857 (239 Away); Referee: Peter Wright

==== Southern Section ====
4 December 2018	Chelsea U21 (ACA)	2–1	AFC Wimbledon (L1)	London
19:00 GMT	Brown 37' (pen.); Redan 47'		Wordsworth 70' (red card) 88'	Stadium: Stamford Bridge; Attendance: 1,906; Referee: Charles Breakspear

4 December 2018	Exeter City (L2)	0–2	Peterborough United (L1)	Exeter
19:15 GMT			Toney 67'; Cummings 77'	Stadium: St James Park; Attendance: 746; Referee: Alan Young

4 December 2018	Cambridge United (L2)	1–1 (2–4 p)	Northampton Town (L2)	Cambridge
19:45 GMT	Maris 9'		van Veen 89'	Stadium: Abbey Stadium; Attendance: 648; Referee: Brett Huxtable
	Penalties
	Azeez (penalty missed); Brown (penalty missed); Amoo (penalty scored); Lambe (penalty scored)		van Veen (penalty scored); Taylor (penalty missed); Foley (penalty scored); Waters (penalty scored); McWilliams (penalty scored)

4 December 2018	Cheltenham Town (L2)	1–1 (7–6 p)	Newport County (L2)	Cheltenham
19:45 GMT	Addai 68'		Amond 18'	Stadium: Whaddon Road; Attendance: 739; Referee: Andy Woolmer
	Penalties
	Thomas (penalty scored); Forster (penalty scored); Tozer (penalty scored); Clements (penalty scored); Jones (penalty scored); Mooney (penalty scored); Field (penalty scored)		Amond (penalty scored); Butler (penalty scored); Labadie (penalty scored); Sheehan (penalty scored); Semenyo (penalty scored); Demetriou (penalty scored); Harris (penalty missed)

4 December 2018	Portsmouth (L1)	2–1	Arsenal U21 (ACA)	Portsmouth
19:45 GMT	Pitman 10'; Green 83'		Saka 66'	Stadium: Fratton Park; Attendance: 3,109; Referee: Thomas Bramall

5 December 2018	Luton Town (L1)	1–1 (2–4 p)	Southend United (L1)	Luton
19:45 GMT	Read 81'		McLaughlin 88'	Stadium: Kenilworth Road; Attendance: 1,545; Referee: Darren Drysdale
	Penalties
	Jones (penalty scored); Sheehan (penalty scored); Jarvis (penalty missed); Hylton (penalty missed)		Mantom (penalty scored); Kightly (penalty scored); McLaughlin (penalty scored); McCoulsky (penalty scored)

5 December 2018	Swansea City U21 (ACA)	1–2	Bristol Rovers (L1)	Swansea
19:45 GMT	Garrick 54'		Craig 58'; Jakubiak 89'	Stadium: Liberty Stadium; Attendance: 699; Referee: Chris Sarginson

18 December 2018	Oxford United (L1)	3–0	Tottenham Hotspur U21 (ACA)	Oxford
19:45 GMT	Raglan 12'; Smith 18'; McMahon 48'			Stadium: Kassam Stadium; Attendance: 1,422; Referee: Kevin Johnson

=== Round 3 ===
The draw for round 3 was held on Saturday, 8 December. Northern and Southern section teams were still segregated this round and will be brought together in the next round (the quarter-finals). No seeding is used from this point: all teams within their denoted section are in a blind draw.

==== Northern Section ====
8 January 2019	Rochdale (L1)	2–4	Manchester City U21 (ACA)	Rochdale
	McNulty 4'; Dooley 29'		Bolton 50'; Braaf 67', 82'; Richards 84'	Stadium: Spotland Stadium; Attendance: 2,176

8 January 2019	Sunderland (L1)	4–0	Newcastle United U21 (ACA)	Sunderland
19:45	Watts 49' (o.g.); Wyke 52'; Maguire 78'; Kimpioka 86'	Report		Stadium: Stadium of Light; Attendance: 16,654; Referee: Tony Harrington

8 January 2019	Accrington Stanley (L1)	2–4	Bury (L2)	Accrington
	Clark 10'; Kee 38'		Telford 55', 74'; Maynard 57'; Mayor 84'	Stadium: Crown Ground; Attendance: 1,136

8 January 2019	Port Vale (L2)	1–1 (4–3 p)	Shrewsbury Town (L1)	Stoke-on-Trent
	Pope 83'		Sears 63'	Stadium: Vale Park; Attendance: 1,355
	Penalties
	Oyeleke (penalty scored); Miller (penalty scored); Pope (penalty missed); Kay (penalty scored); Hannant (penalty scored)		Okenabirhie (penalty scored); Gilliead (penalty missed); Angol (penalty scored); Eisa (penalty missed); Barnett (penalty scored)

==== Southern Section ====
8 January 2019	Southend United (L1)	0–2	Portsmouth (L1)	Southend-on-Sea
		Report	Dennis 2'; Evans 45+1'	Stadium: Roots Hall; Attendance: 1,649

8 January 2019	Cheltenham Town (L2)	1–1 (1–4 p)	Oxford United (L1)	Cheltenham
	Dawson 64'	Report	Brannagan 45+1'	Stadium: Whaddon Road; Attendance: 1,288
	Penalties
	Thomas (penalty missed); Clements (penalty missed); Hussey (penalty scored)		Mousinho (penalty scored); Henry (penalty scored); Graham (penalty scored); Brannagan (penalty scored)

8 January 2019	Northampton Town (L2)	1–2	Bristol Rovers (L1)	Northampton
	Crooks 76'	Report	Broadbent 45'; Payne 58'	Stadium: Sixfields Stadium; Attendance: 1,312

9 January 2019	Chelsea U21 (ACA)	1–3	Peterborough United (L1)	London
	Nartey 45'	Report	Dembélé 65'; Toney 72'; Maddison 74'	Stadium: Stamford Bridge; Attendance: 2,671

=== Round 4 / Quarter-finals ===
Quarter-final pairings are determined by means of an unseeded draw. There are no further segregated sections of the draw.

22 January 2019	Portsmouth (L1)	1–0	Peterborough United (L1)	Portsmouth
19:00	Wheeler 85'	Report		Stadium: Fratton Park; Attendance: 3,313

22 January 2019	Bristol Rovers (L1)	3–0	Port Vale (L2)	Bristol
19:45	Clarke 16'; Nichols 62' (pen.); Rodman 68'	Report		Stadium: Memorial Stadium; Attendance: 2,016

22 January 2019	Bury (L2)	5–2	Oxford United (L1)	Bury
19:45	Telford 16'; Thompson 26'; Moore 41'; Mayor 55', 76'	Report	Henry 24' (pen.); Carruthers 51'	Stadium: Gigg Lane; Attendance: 1,238

22 January 2019	Sunderland (L1)	2–0	Manchester City U21 (ACA)	Sunderland
19:45	Watmore 22'; Gooch 65'	Report		Stadium: Stadium of Light; Attendance: 14,679; Referee: Michael Salisbury

=== Semi-finals ===
The four winners from the quarter-finals will contest the semi-finals, with the pairings determined by an unseeded draw. Matches will be played as one leg, and will advance directly to penalties if the teams are tied after 90 minutes.

26 February 2019	Bury (L2)	0–3	Portsmouth (L1)	Bury
19:45			Evans 61'; Hawkins 64'; Curtis 77'	Stadium: Gigg Lane; Attendance: 3,900

5 March 2019	Bristol Rovers (L1)	0–2	Sunderland (L1)	Bristol
19:45			Grigg 44'; Morgan 47'	Stadium: Memorial Stadium; Attendance: 6,699

=== Final ===
The two winners from the semi-finals, Portsmouth and Sunderland, contested the final at Wembley Stadium on 31 March 2019. Portsmouth won 5–4 on penalties following a 2–2 draw after extra time to win their first EFL trophy.

31 March 2019
14:30 BST

Portsmouth	2–2 (a.e.t.)	Sunderland
Thompson 82'; Lowe 114'	Report	McGeady 38', 119'
Penalties
Evans (penalty scored); Pitman (penalty scored); Brown (penalty scored); Lowe (penalty scored); Hawkins (penalty scored)	5–4	(penalty scored) McGeady; (penalty missed) Cattermole; (penalty scored) Gooch; (penalty scored) Power; (penalty scored) O'Nien

Wembley Stadium, London
Attendance: 85,021
Referee: Dean Whitestone
