= Joan Luque =

Spanish footballer

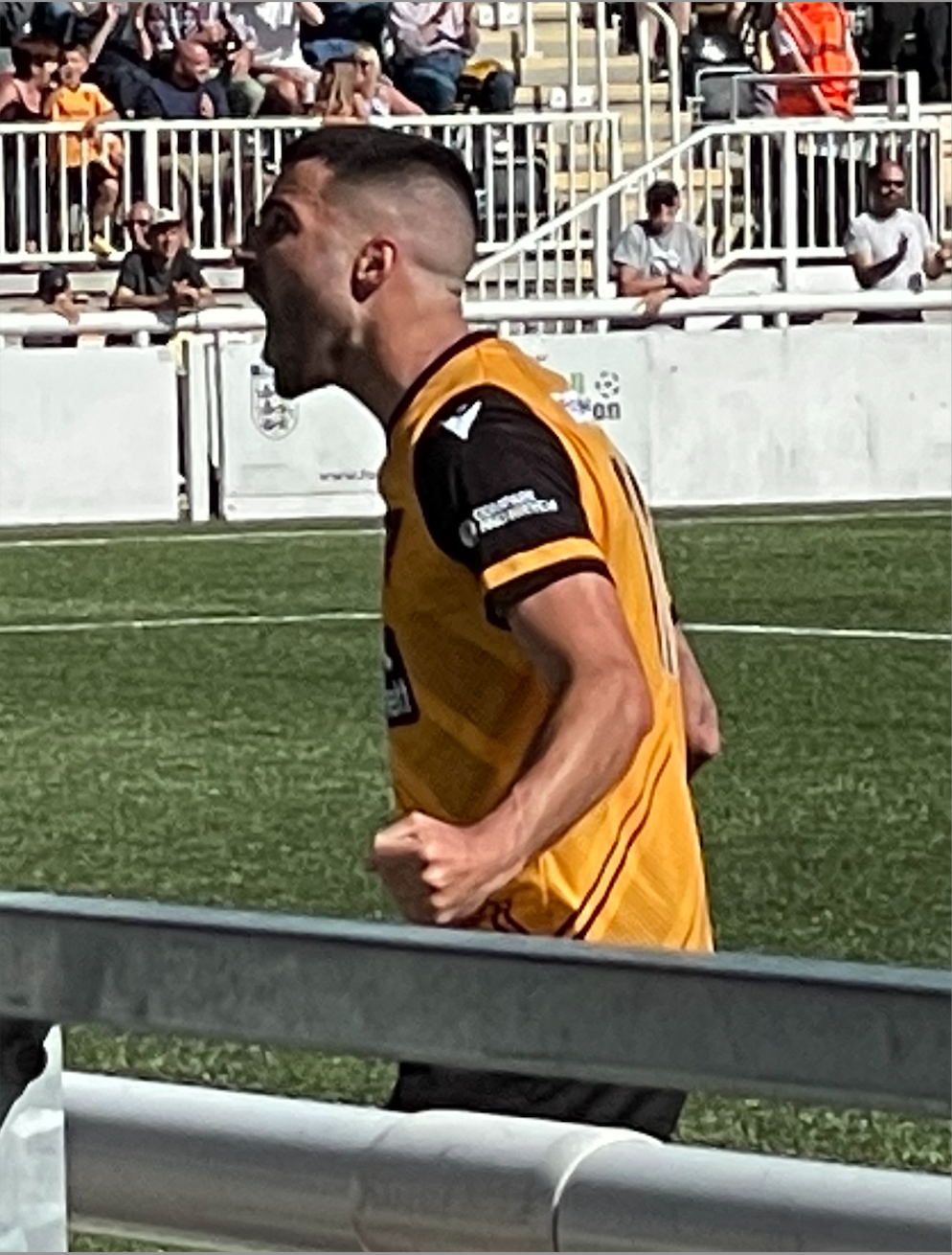
- Luque playing for Maidstone United.

Personal information
- Full name: Joan Luque Prados
- Date of birth: 16 June 1992 (age 34)
- Place of birth: Barcelona, Spain
- Height: 1.86 m (6 ft 1 in)
- Position: Winger

Youth career
- 2002–2004: Barcelona
- 2004–2006: Damm
- 2006–2008: Gramenet
- 2008–2009: Europa
- 2009–2011: Cornellà

Senior career*
Years	Team	Apps	(Gls)
2011–2012	Gramenet B	10	(3)
2011–2012	Gramenet	22	(4)
2012	Montañesa	5	(0)
2012–2013	Vilassar Mar	24	(5)
2013–2014	Santboià	20	(0)
2014	Sabadell B	10	(2)
2014–2016	Sant Rafel	72	(23)
2016–2017	Llosetense	31	(8)
2017–2018	Heybridge Swifts	38	(17)
2018–2019	Lincoln City	1	(0)
2018	→ Bromley (loan)	4	(0)
2019	Concord Rangers	15	(5)
2019–2020	Dagenham & Redbridge	28	(3)
2020–2021	Maidstone United	10	(4)
2021	Weymouth	10	(0)
2021–2023	Maidstone United	33	(20)
2023–2024	Worthing	24	(4)
2024	→ AFC Totton (loan)	16	(5)
2024	Folkestone Invicta	0	(0)
Total		373	(103)
- * Club domestic league appearances and goals

Joan Luque Prados (born 16 June 1992) is a Spanish former professional footballer who played as a winger.

== Club career ==
=== Early career ===
Born in Barcelona, Catalonia, Luque spent two years with FC Barcelona between the ages of 11 and 13. After Barcelona he played for Damm and Gramenet. He also participated in the 2010 Copa del Rey Juvenil with Cornellà, after a short stint with Europa.

Luque started his senior career with Gramenet's reserve team, in the regional leagues. On 7 June 2012, he agreed to a contract with Montañesa in the fourth division, but was deemed surplus to requirements and moved to fellow league team Vilassar de Mar.

On 15 June 2013, Luque joined fellow fourth-tier side Santboià, but left for Sabadell B on the following 21 February. On 8 August 2014, he signed for Sant Rafel, still in the fourth level, and signed a new one-year contract the following 27 May 2015.

In July 2016, Luque joined Llosetense, freshly relegated from Segunda División B.

=== Heybridge Swifts ===
In July 2017 he was one of 21 players from Spain, Andorra and Argentina who trained with English non-League club Heybridge Swifts as part of an initiative set up by Heybridge Swifts player Guillem Ramón. He signed for the club, combining his playing career with working as a waiter in a restaurant. He scored six goals for the club in their 2017–18 FA Cup run.

He was voted as Heybridge's Player of the Month by the fans twice – in August 2017 and September 2017, and was named to the Isthmian League Team of the Year for the 2017–18 season. He scored 30 goals for Heybridge in all competitions, including 17 in the league.

=== Lincoln City ===
After a successful pre-season trial, Luque joined EFL League Two club Lincoln City on six-month contract on 9 August 2018. On 25 August, he made his professional debut, coming on as a 90th-minute substitute for Bruno Andrade in a 3–1 home win against Notts County. Three days later, he scored first goal for the club in a 1–4 loss at Blackburn Rovers in the EFL Cup.

Luque moved on loan to National League side Bromley on 21 September 2018. After making 5 appearances in all competitions for Bromley, he was recalled by Lincoln in December 2018. He was released by Lincoln on 2 January 2019.

=== Return to non-league ===
He signed for Concord Rangers later that month. He moved to Dagenham & Redbridge in May 2019.

In October 2020 his contract was terminated by mutual consent and he subsequently signed for National League South side Maidstone United, with the Stones assistant manager, Terry Harris, instrumental in bringing Luque to the club.

On 23 January 2021 he signed for Weymouth. He left the club in April after ten appearances.

In June 2021, Luque returned to Maidstone United. Following Maidstone's title win, Luque was named National League South Player of the Year for the 2021–22. Having failed to feature in the 2022–23 season due to a knee injury sustained in April 2022, in March 2023 he was informed by new manager George Elokobi that he would be departing the club at the end of the season as he did not feature in the team's plans. His departure was confirmed on 27 April 2023.

On 30 May 2023, Luque signed for National League South club Worthing. In January 2024, he joined Southern League Premier Division South club AFC Totton on an initial one-month loan deal.

On 4 June 2024, Luque joined Isthmian League Premier Division club Folkestone Invicta. In July 2024, having yet to make a competitive appearance for Folkestone, Luque announced his retirement from football, intending to return to his native Spain.

== Club statistics ==
As of match played 18 April 2022

Club	Season	League			Cup		League Cup		Other		Total	
Club	Season	Division	Apps	Goals	Apps	Goals	Apps	Goals	Apps	Goals	Apps	Goals
Gramenet B	2011–12	Primera Catalana	10	3	—		—		—		10	3
Gramenet	2011–12	Tercera División	22	4	—		—		—		22	4
Montañesa	2012–13	Tercera División	5	0	—		—		—		5	0
Vilassar de Mar	2012–13	Tercera División	24	5	—		—		—		24	5
Santboià	2013–14	Tercera División	20	0	—		—		—		20	0
Sabadell B	2013–14	Primera Catalana	10	2	—		—		2 (Note: Two appearances in Primera Catalana promotion play-offs.)	0	12	2
Sant Rafel	2014–15	Tercera División	36	11	—		—		—		36	11
Sant Rafel	2015–16	Tercera División	36	12	—		—		—		36	12
Sant Rafel	Total		72	23	—		—		—		72	23
Llosetense	2016–17	Tercera División	31	8	—		—		—		31	8
Heybridge Swifts	2017–18	Isthmian League North	38	17	8	6	—		15 (Note: Nine appearances and four goals in FA Trophy, three appearances and one goal in Alan Turvey Trophy, one appearance and one goal in Tolleshunt D'Arcy Memorial Cup, one appearance and one goal in Essex Senior Cup, one appearance in Isthmian League promotion play-offs.)	7	61	30
Lincoln City	2018–19	EFL League Two	1	0	0	0	1	1	2 (Note: Appearances in EFL Trophy)	0	4	1
Bromley (loan)	2018–19	National League	4	0	0	0	—		1	0	5	0
Concord Rangers	2018–19	National League South	15	5	0	0	—		0	0	15	5
Dagenham & Redbridge	2019–20	National League	28	3	1	0	—		1 (Note: Appearance(s) in FA Trophy)	2	30	5
Maidstone United	2020–21	National League South	10	4	—		—		2	1	12	5
Weymouth	2020–21	National League	10	0	—		—		0	0	10	0
Maidstone United	2021–22	National League South	33	20	2	1	—		2	1	37	22
Career total			333	94	11	7	1	1	25	11	370	113
