= Matt Rhead =

English footballer

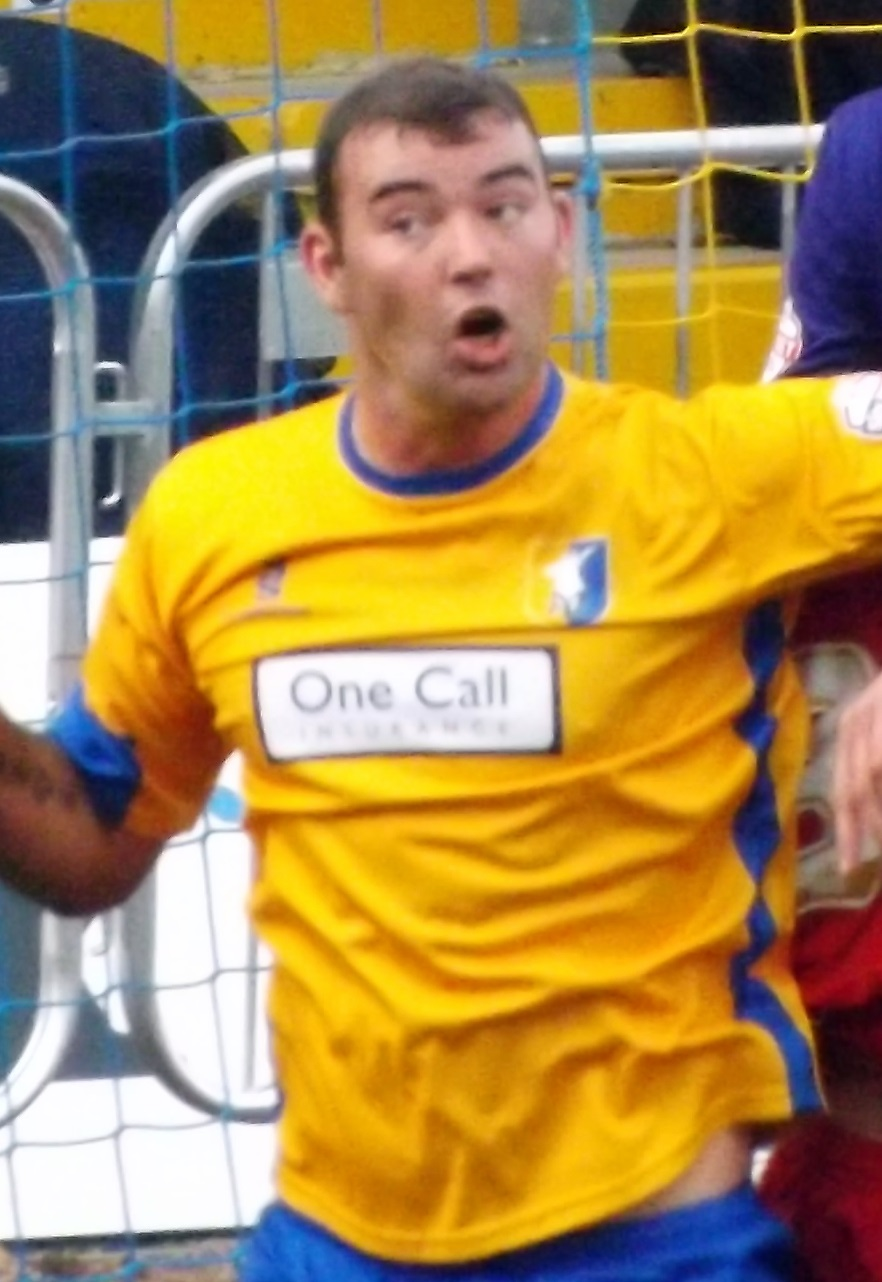
- Rhead playing for Mansfield Town in 2013

Personal information
- Full name: Matthew James Rhead
- Date of birth: 31 May 1984 (age 42)
- Place of birth: Stoke-on-Trent, England
- Height: 6 ft 4 in (1.93 m)
- Position: Forward

Team information
- Current team: Kidsgrove Athletic

Senior career*
Years	Team	Apps	(Gls)
20??–2004	Norton United		
2004–2007	Kidsgrove Athletic		
2007–2009	Eastwood Town	37	(13)
2008	→ Kidsgrove Athletic (loan)		
2009–2010	Nantwich Town	17	(7)
2009–2010	Congleton Town		
2010–2011	Eastwood Town	37	(13)
2011–2012	Corby Town	22	(8)
2012–2015	Mansfield Town	120	(15)
2015–2019	Lincoln City	161	(43)
2019	Billericay Town	11	(2)
2020–2021	Boreham Wood	32	(1)
2021–2024	Alfreton Town	80	(25)
2024–	Kidsgrove Athletic	20	(6)

Managerial career
- 2025–2026: Kidsgrove Athletic (joint player-manager with Tom Pope)
- 2026–: Kidsgrove Athletic
- * Club domestic league appearances and goals as of 18:36, 11 February 2025 (UTC)

Matthew James Rhead (born 31 May 1984) is an English professional footballer who plays as a forward for Northern Premier League Division One West club Kidsgrove Athletic where he holds the role of player-manager.

He notably spent two successful professional spells with both Mansfield Town and Lincoln City where he won promotion to the Football League with both and saw further success with The Imps that yielded an EFL Trophy triumph and later the EFL League Two title. Prior to his time at Mansfield he had come up through Non-League football and had played for Norton United, Kidsgrove Athletic, Eastwood Town, Nantwich Town, Congleton Town and Corby Town. Following his release from Lincoln he has returned to playing at a semi-professional level and has turned out for both Billericay Town and Boreham Wood.

== Career ==
=== Early career ===
Rhead, age 41, was born in Stoke-on-Trent and played for nearby non-league sides Norton United and Stallington before joining Kidsgrove Athletic ahead of the 2004–2005 season. He moved on to join Eastwood Town, making a goal scoring debut in the club's 2–3 home defeat to Matlock Town on 16 October 2007. The fee was a record for the two clubs and Rhead would end the season as Eastwood's top goalscorer of the season having netted 17 goals from 26 starts. At the end of September 2008, he rejoined Kidsgrove Athletic on a month's loan but with the loan restricting him only to league games, he started only a single game before returning to Eastwood at the end of the loan period. He departed Eastwood to join Nantwich Town for the start of the 2009–2010 season before joining Congleton Town on an initial month's loan, making a goalscoring debut in the club's draw with Squires Gate on 12 December 2009; after a month's loan he agreed terms to join the club on a permanent basis until the end of the 2009–10 season. Having been invited for pre-season training with Eastwood Town he rejoined the club he had first joined for £4000 from Kidsgrove back in October 2007. He joined Corby Town from Eastwood Town in June 2011.

=== Mansfield Town ===
He signed for Mansfield Town in January 2012, and scored two goals in 17 games in the 2011–12 season. In July 2012, he quit his job as a team leader at JCB to become a full-time professional footballer. He then scored five goals in 37 games in the 2012–13 campaign as the "Stags" won promotion into the Football League as champions of the Conference Premier.

=== Lincoln City ===
Rhead signed a two-year contract with Lincoln City on 14 May 2015. The following year he handed in a transfer request and was set to join Barrow, but the arrival of Danny Cowley as Lincoln manager persuaded him to stay at the club, and he finished the 2016-17 season as Lincoln's top scorer as they won the National League. The same year he, played an important part in Lincoln's record-breaking run to the quarter-finals of the FA Cup, gaining fame when Joey Barton took a dive in an attempt to get him sent off during Lincoln's win at Burnley.

=== Billericay Town ===
Following two promotions from the National League to League One with Lincoln City, Rhead began to find his opportunities at Lincoln decreasing, and on 25 July 2019, Rhead signed for Billericay Town on a two-year deal for an undisclosed fee. On 16 October 2019, after only two months with the club, Rhead departed after the club's chairman and director resigned.

=== Alfreton Town ===
On 2 July 2021, Rhead joined Alfreton Town following his departure from Boreham Wood. Matt Rhead, dubbed 'Rheady' quickly became a fan favourite at the Impact Arena due to the desire and passion he displayed. The striker was awarded with the Supporters' Player of the Year Award following the conclusion of the 2021/22 campaign. The following season, 2022/23, Matt Rhead captained his side to a fifth placed finish, this put Alfreton into the playoffs in which they lost 1-0 to Kidderminster Harriers.

=== Kidsgrove Athletic ===
Following Rhead's release from Alfreton in 2024, he returned to Kidsgrove Athletic where he played 20 years prior. He scored his first goal back at 'The Grove' a month later in a 2-1 defeat to Belper Town in the FA Trophy.

In February 2025, Rhead was appointed joint player-manager of Kidsgrove Athletic alongside Tom Pope until the end of the season.

== Career statistics ==
As of match played 4 September 2021

Club	Season	League			FA Cup		League Cup		Other		Total	
Club	Season	Division	Apps	Goals	Apps	Goals	Apps	Goals	Apps	Goals	Apps	Goals
Eastwood Town	2008–09	Conference North	0	0	2	0	0	0	0	0	2	0
Eastwood Town	2010–11	Conference North	37	13	0	0	0	0	3 (Note: Appearances in FA Trophy)	1	40	14
Eastwood Town	Total		37	13	2	0	0	0	3	1	42	14
Corby Town	2011–12	Conference North	22	8	6	4	—		2	1	30	13
Mansfield Town	2011–12	Conference Premier	15	2	—		—		2 (Note: Appearances in Conference Premier play-offs)	0	17	2
Mansfield Town	2012–13	Conference Premier	33	4	5	1	—		2	0	40	5
Mansfield Town	2013–14	League Two	40	6	1	0	1	0	0	0	42	6
Mansfield Town	2014–15	League Two	32	3	3	0	0	0	1 (Note: Appearances in EFL Trophy)	0	36	3
Mansfield Town	Total		120	15	9	1	1	0	5	0	135	16
Lincoln City	2015–16	National League	43	20	3	3	—		1	0	47	23
Lincoln City	2016–17	National League	43	14 (Note: Many sources claim that Rhead scored 15 goals in this season, but one of them was later awarded to Theo Robinson instead. "Robinson Credited With Chester Opener". weareimps.com.)	9	0	—		4	0	56	14
Lincoln City	2017–18	League Two	43	8	1	0	1	0	5	1	50	9
Lincoln City	2018–19	League Two	34	1	3	1	2	0	4	1	43	3
Lincoln City	Total		163	43	16	4	3	0	14	2	196	49
Billericay Town	2019-20	National League South	11	2	0	0	0	0	0	0	11	2
Boreham Wood	2019–20	National League	5	0	0	0	—		2 (Note: Two appearances in National League play-offs)	1	7	1
Boreham Wood	2020–21	National League	27	1	4	1	—		1	0	32	2
Boreham Wood	Total		32	1	4	1	0	0	3	1	39	3
Alfreton Town	2021–22	National League North	47	14	0	0	—		0	0	5	2
Career total			432	97	37	10	4	0	27	5	455	99

== Honours ==
Mansfield Town

- Conference Premier: 2012–13

Lincoln City

- EFL League Two: 2018–19
- National League: 2016–17
- EFL Trophy: 2017–18
