= Bruno Andrade (footballer, born 1993) =

Portuguese footballer (born 1993)

Personal information
- Full name: Bruno Miguel Carvalho Andrade
- Date of birth: 2 October 1993 (age 33)
- Place of birth: Viseu, Portugal
- Height: 1.75 m (5 ft 9 in)
- Position: Forward

Youth career
- 2006–2010: Queens Park Rangers

Senior career*
Years	Team	Apps	(Gls)
2010–2015	Queens Park Rangers	2	(0)
2011	→ Aldershot Town (loan)	1	(0)
2012–2013	→ Wycombe Wanderers (loan)	23	(2)
2013–2014	→ Stevenage (loan)	13	(0)
2015	→ Stevenage (loan)	16	(1)
2015–2016	Woking	43	(5)
2016–2018	Boreham Wood	84	(32)
2018–2020	Lincoln City	59	(11)
2020–2021	Salford City	26	(0)
2021–2022	Stevenage	27	(0)
2022–2023	Boreham Wood	3	(0)
2023	Maidenhead United	3	(0)
2023	Chesham United	6	(1)
2023–2024	Kettering Town	17	(4)
2024	Maidstone United	7	(0)
2024	Kettering Town	4	(0)
2025	Bedford Town	8	(3)
2025–2026	AFC Rushden & Diamonds	34	(17)
2026	Matlock Town	0	(0)
2026-	AFC Rushden & Diamonds	8	(4)
- * Club domestic league appearances and goals as of 16:07, 24 March 2026 (UTC)

Bruno Miguel Carvalho Andrade (born 2 October 1993) is a Portuguese footballer who plays as a forward.

Born in Viseu, he joined the academy of Queens Park Rangers at a young age, and went on to make a total of four first-team appearances for the club. He has also had loan spells at Aldershot Town, Wycombe Wanderers and Stevenage.

Andrade left the club in 2015 and spent a year with National League side Woking, before joining Boreham Wood in July 2016. He spent two seasons at the club and scored 20 league goals to help Boreham Wood reach the play-off final. He left after a defeat and moved back up to the Football League by joining Lincoln City for the 2018–19 League Two season, signing on a free transfer. He signed for Salford City in January 2020, and was released in 2021, where he returned to Stevenage.

On 24 March 2026, Bruno signed for Northern Premier League Eastern Division side Matlock Town

== Career ==
=== Queens Park Rangers ===
Born in Portugal, Andrade joined the Queens Park Rangers academy at the age of 13. He signed his first professional contract with the club in October 2010, with his manager Neil Warnock describing him as "an exciting young player". He made his debut for Queens Park Rangers against Preston North End later that month. He then made his second appearance for the club against Blackburn Rovers in the FA Cup. He replaced Jamie Mackie who had broken his leg. He made a further two first-team appearances at the beginning of the 2011–12 season, including his Premier League debut.

Andrade was loaned out to League Two side Aldershot Town for one month from 29 September 2011. He made a total of two appearances for Aldershot before returning to QPR, where he did not make any more appearances for the season.

Having not made a first team appearance in over a year, on 9 October 2012, Andrade was loaned out to another League Two side, Wycombe Wanderers, on an initial month's loan. The loan went on to be extended until the end of the season, and Andrade made a total of 26 appearances and scored two goals in his time at Wycombe.

The following season, Andrade joined League One club Stevenage on a three-month loan deal on 4 October 2013. In mid-January, his loan spell with the club was extended for another month. A month after it was extended, Andrade would return to Queens Park Rangers in conclusion of Stevenage loan spell.

In May 2014, Andrade signed a new 12-month contract with QPR. On 2 February 2015, he joined Stevenage on loan for the second consecutive season, initially signing a one-month deal. The loan deal was extended until the end of the 2014–15 season.

=== Woking ===
Andrade was released from Queens Park Rangers in May 2015. He then joined non-league side Woking on a one-year deal in demand for first team football. On 8 August 2015, Andrade made his Woking debut in a 1–0 defeat to Tranmere Rovers playing the full 90 minutes. On 19 December 2015, Andrade scored his first Woking goal in a 5–1 goal glut over Gateshead, netting in the 58th minute. On 23 April 2016, for the first time in his playing career, he scored two goals in two consecutive games, netting in a 3–1 home defeat to Grimsby Town and in a 3–2 victory over Lincoln City.

=== Boreham Wood ===
On 17 May 2016, Andrade rejected a new deal at Woking to join league rivals Boreham Wood on a one-year deal. On 6 August 2016, he made his Boreham Wood debut in a 1–0 victory over Forest Green Rovers, playing the full 90 minutes. Three days later, he scored his first Boreham Wood goals in a 4–1 victory against Dover Athletic, netting both in a space of ten minutes. On 29 October 2016, he scored the winner in a 2–1 victory against his former club Woking, netting five minutes after Ángelo Balanta had scored the equaliser.

Following his debut campaign, Andrade opted to stay with Wood for the forthcoming season and registered his first goal during their 2–1 home defeat on 8 August, against Dagenham & Redbridge. Converting a penalty in the 7th minute. Subsequently, Andrade went onto net five goals in the space of seven games, taking his tally to six goals by the start of September. Following this, several Football League clubs took interest in the Portuguese forward, including Portsmouth. However, after training with the club, the League One side opted against signing him. On 25 November 2017, Andrade registered his tenth league goal of the season during a 2–1 home victory over his former club, Woking, slotting past goalkeeper Sam Mason in the 82nd minute.

=== Lincoln City ===
On 24 May 2018, Andrade signed for League Two club Lincoln City on a two-year deal. He scored his first goal for Lincoln in a 3–1 win over Notts County on 25 August 2018.

=== Salford City ===
On 13 January 2020, Andrade signed for League Two club Salford City for an undisclosed fee on a 2 1/2-year deal. Andrade's first goal for the club came on 7 November in the first game of new manager Richie Wellens, scoring the first goal of a 2–0 win against Hartlepool United in the FA Cup first round in extra-time.

=== Stevenage ===
On 26 August 2021, Andrade returned to Stevenage having spent time on loan at the club in two separate spells. He was released by the club at the end of the 2021–22 season.

=== Boreham Wood ===
On 4 October 2022, Andrade returned to National League club Boreham Wood.

=== Maidenhead United ===
In March 2023, Andrade joined Maidenhead United on a deal until the end of the season. He was released in June 2023.

=== Chesham United ===
In September 2023, Andrade joined Southern Football League Premier Division South club Chesham United.

=== Kettering Town ===
In December 2023, Andrade signed for Southern League Premier Division Central club Kettering Town.

=== Maidstone United ===
On 26 July 2024, Andrade joined National League South side Maidstone United following a successful trial period. He was released by the club on 20 September 2024.

=== Return to Kettering Town ===
On 29 September 2024, Andrade's return to Kettering Town was announced.

=== Baller League - SDS FC ===
Andrade signed for the Baller League team SDS FC managed by YouTuber Sharky from SDS Podcast.

=== AFC Rushden and Diamonds ===
On 6 August 2025, Andrade signed for AFC Rushden and Diamonds on an dual-registration from Bedford Town.

On 22 March 2026, Andrade and Tyler Winters were sacked by the club after they were both sent off for fighting on the pitch vs Loughborough Students.

== Personal life ==
Andrade's father José was also a professional footballer.

== Career statistics ==
As of match played 2 December 2023

Appearances and goals by club, season and competition
Club	Season	League			FA Cup		League Cup		Other		Total	
Club	Season	Division	Apps	Goals	Apps	Goals	Apps	Goals	Apps	Goals	Apps	Goals
Queens Park Rangers	2010–11	Championship	1	0	1	0	0	0	—		2	0
Queens Park Rangers	2011–12	Premier League	1	0	0	0	1	0	—		2	0
Queens Park Rangers	2012–13	Premier League	0	0	0	0	0	0	—		0	0
Queens Park Rangers	Total		2	0	1	0	1	0	0	0	4	0
Aldershot Town (loan)	2011–12	League Two	1	0	0	0	0	0	1 (Note: Appearances in Football League Trophy)	0	2	0
Wycombe Wanderers (loan)	2012–13	League Two	23	2	1	0	0	0	2	0	26	2
Stevenage (loan)	2013–14	League One	13	0	4	0	0	0	2	0	19	0
Stevenage (loan)	2014–15	League Two	16	1	0	0	0	0	0	0	16	1
Stevenage (loan)	Total		29	1	4	0	0	0	2	0	35	1
Woking	2015–16	National League	43	5	1	0	—		3 (Note: Appearances in FA Trophy)	0	47	5
Boreham Wood	2016–17	National League	36	10	3	1	—		6	1	45	12
Boreham Wood	2017–18	National League	45	20	3	2	—		7 (Note: Four appearances and two goals in FA Trophy, three appearances and two goals in National League play-offs)	4	55	26
Boreham Wood	Total		81	30	6	3	—		13	5	100	38
Lincoln City	2018–19	League Two	42	10	3	1	2	0	3 (Note: Appearances in EFL Trophy)	0	50	11
Lincoln City	2019–20	League One	17	1	2	0	2	1	2	0	23	2
Lincoln City	Total		59	11	5	1	4	1	5	0	73	13
Salford City	2019–20	League Two	7	0	0	0	0	0	0	0	7	0
Salford City	2020–21	League Two	19	0	2	1	2	0	4	1	27	2
Salford City	Total		26	0	2	1	2	0	4	1	34	2
Stevenage	2021–22	League Two	27	0	2	0	0	0	2	0	31	0
Boreham Wood	2022–23	National League	3	0	0	0	—		1	0	4	0
Maidenhead United	2022–23	National League	3	0	0	0	—		0	0	3	0
Chesham United	2023–24	SL Premier Division South	6	1	4	1	—		2	0	12	2
Career total			236	43	24	6	7	1	29	6	296	56

== Honours ==
Lincoln City

- EFL League Two: 2018–19

Salford City

- EFL Trophy: 2019–20

Individual

- National League Team of the Year: 2017–18
