= 2020–21 EFL Trophy =

Tournament details
- Country: England; Wales
- Teams: 64

Final positions
- Champions: Sunderland (1st title)
- Runners-up: Tranmere Rovers

Tournament statistics
- Matches played: 127
- Goals scored: 420 (3.31 per match)
- Top goal scorer(s): (England) Harvey Saunders Fleetwood Town (England) Charlie Wyke Sunderland (5 Goals Each)

The 2020–21 EFL Trophy, known as the Leasing.com Trophy before 28 October 2020 and later the Papa John's Trophy for sponsorship reasons, was the 40th season in the history of the competition, a knock-out tournament for English football clubs in League One and League Two of the English football system, and also including 16 Premier League and Championship "Academy teams" with Category One status.

Salford City were the defending champions; however, the 2020 final was delayed due to the COVID-19 pandemic until the day prior to the 2021 final. Hence, for most of the tournament, Portsmouth (who won the 2019 final and were also in the 2020 final) were the most recent champions.

Sunderland won the trophy for the first time after beating Tranmere Rovers 1–0 in the final.

== Participating clubs ==
- 48 clubs from League One and League Two.
- 16 invited Category One Academy teams.
- Expelled clubs were automatically eliminated from the tournament.
- Category One teams relegated to League One missed out on having academies participate in the following tournament.

Four Premier League clubs with Category One academies did not participate: Burnley and Crystal Palace, both in their first full season of Category One status, and Everton and Tottenham Hotspur, who both played in the previous year's competition but declined to participate in this one. A fifth Premier League club's academy, Sheffield United, did not have Category One status. As a result, the academy of Championship-side Norwich City was invited instead.

	League One	League Two	Academies
Clubs	Accrington Stanley; AFC Wimbledon; Blackpool; Bristol Rovers; Burton Albion; Charlton Athletic; Crewe Alexandra; Doncaster Rovers; Fleetwood Town; Gillingham; Hull City; Ipswich Town; Lincoln City; Milton Keynes Dons; Northampton Town; Oxford United; Peterborough United; Plymouth Argyle; Portsmouth; Rochdale; Shrewsbury Town; Sunderland; Swindon Town; Wigan Athletic	Barrow; Bolton Wanderers; Bradford City; Cambridge United; Carlisle United; Cheltenham Town; Colchester United; Crawley Town; Exeter City; Forest Green Rovers; Grimsby Town; Harrogate Town; Leyton Orient; Mansfield Town; Morecambe; Newport County; Oldham Athletic; Port Vale; Salford City; Scunthorpe United; Southend United; Stevenage; Tranmere Rovers; Walsall	Arsenal; Aston Villa; Brighton & Hove Albion; Chelsea; Fulham; Leeds United; Leicester City; Liverpool; Manchester City; Manchester United; Newcastle United; Norwich City; Southampton; West Bromwich Albion; West Ham United; Wolverhampton Wanderers
Total	24	24	16

== Eligibility criteria for players ==
For EFL clubs

- Minimum of four qualifying outfield players in their starting XI. A qualifying outfield player was one who met any of the following requirements:
  - Any player who started the previous or following first-team fixture.
  - Any player who was in the top 10 players at the club who had made the most starting appearances in league and domestic cup competitions that season.
  - Any player with forty or more first-team appearances in their career.
  - Any player on loan from a Premier League club or any EFL Category One Academy club.
- A club could play any eligible goalkeeper in the competition.

== Competition format ==
Group stage

- Sixteen groups of four teams were organised on a regionalised basis.
- All groups included one invited club.
- All clubs played each other once, either home or away (Academies played all group matches away from home).
- Clubs were awarded three points for a win and one point for a draw.
- In the event of a drawn game (after 90 minutes), a penalty shoot-out was held with the winning team earning an additional point.
- Clubs expelled from the EFL were knocked out of the tournament automatically.
- The top two teams progressed to the knockout stage.

Knockout stage

- Round 2 and 3 of the competition were drawn on a regionalised basis.
- In Round 2, the group winners were seeded and the group runners-up were unseeded in the draw.
- In Round 2, teams who played in the same group as each other in the group stage were kept apart from each other.

== Group stage ==
=== Northern Section ===
==== Group A ====
Pos	Div	Team	Pld	W	PW	PL	L	GF	GA	GD	Pts	Qualification
1	L1	Fleetwood Town	3	3	0	0	0	8	2	+6	9	Advance to Round 2
2	L1	Sunderland	3	2	0	0	1	14	6	+8	6	Advance to Round 2
3	L2	Carlisle United	3	1	0	0	2	7	9	−2	3	
4	ACA	Aston Villa U21	3	0	0	0	3	2	14	−12	0	

Source: EFL.com

1 September 2020	Carlisle United	1–3	Fleetwood Town	Carlisle
19:00 BST	Touré 36' (red card) 90'	Report	Camps 44'; Saunders 57', 68'	Stadium: Brunton Park; Attendance: 0 Referee: Ben Speedie

8 September 2020	Sunderland	8–1	Aston Villa U21	Stadium of Light
19:00 BST	Wyke 15', 50'; Feeney 21'; Scowen 75'; Power 77'; Graham 82'; Dobson 84'; O'Brien 90'	Report	Vassilev 47' (pen.)	Attendance: 0 Referee: Carl Boyeson

6 October 2020	Fleetwood Town	3–0	Aston Villa U21	Highbury Stadium
19:45 BST	Saunders 3', 4', 15'			Attendance: 0 Referee: Peter Wright

6 October 2020	Sunderland	5–3	Carlisle United	Stadium of Light
19:45 BST	Maguire 26', 54'; Hume 37'; Wyke 69'; Diamond 90+1'		Alessandra 6' (pen.); Mellish 72', 82'	Attendance: 0

10 November 2020	Fleetwood Town	2–1	Sunderland	Highbury Stadium
19:45 GMT	McKay 51'; Duffy 59'		McFadzean 15'	Attendance: 0

17 November 2020	Carlisle United	3–1	Aston Villa U21	Brunton Park
19:00 GMT	Obiero 32'; Touré 55'; Reilly 68'		Sohna 82'	Attendance: 0

==== Group B ====
Pos	Div	Team	Pld	W	PW	PL	L	GF	GA	GD	Pts	Qualification
1	L2	Salford City	3	2	0	0	1	4	7	−3	6	Advance to Round 2
2	ACA	Manchester United U21	3	1	1	0	1	6	4	+2	5	Advance to Round 2
3	L1	Rochdale	3	1	0	1	1	3	3	0	4	
4	L2	Morecambe	3	1	0	0	2	5	4	+1	3	

Source: EFL.com

8 September 2020	Morecambe	1–2	Rochdale	Globe Arena
19:45 BST	Lavelle 23'	Report	Tavares 86'; Newby 90+3'	Attendance: 0 Referee: Sam Barrott

9 September 2020	Salford City	0–6	Manchester United U21	Moor Lane
19:45 BST		Report	Mejbri 8'; Puigmal 19'; Helm 46', 73'; McCann 70'; Elanga 74'	Attendance: 0 Referee: Peter Wright

29 September 2020	Rochdale	0–0 (4–5 p)	Manchester United U21	Spotland Stadium
19:45 BST		Report		Attendance: 0 Referee: Martin Coy
	Penalties
	Morley (penalty missed); Newby (penalty scored); Tavares (penalty scored); Keohane (penalty scored); Rathbone (penalty scored); Hopper (penalty missed)		Mejbri (penalty scored); McCann (penalty scored); Wellens (penalty missed); Hansen-Aarøen (penalty scored); Elanga (penalty scored); Hugill (penalty scored)

29 September 2020	Salford City	2–0	Morecambe	Moor Lane
19:45 BST	Wilson 45'; Hunter 90+2'	Report		Attendance: 0 Referee: James Bell

10 November 2020	Rochdale	1–2	Salford City	Spotland Stadium
19:00 GMT	Beesley 8'		Andrade 53'; Dieseruvwe 82' (pen.)	Attendance: 0

18 November 2020	Morecambe	4–0	Manchester United U21	Globe Arena
18:30 GMT	Cooney 24', 28'; Davis 34'; Price 62'			Attendance: 0 Referee: Anthony Backhouse

==== Group C ====
Pos	Div	Team	Pld	W	PW	PL	L	GF	GA	GD	Pts	Qualification
1	L1	Shrewsbury Town	3	3	0	0	0	9	4	+5	9	Advance to Round 2
2	L1	Crewe Alexandra	3	2	0	0	1	7	6	+1	6	Advance to Round 2
3	L2	Bolton Wanderers	3	1	0	0	2	6	7	−1	3	
4	ACA	Newcastle United U21	3	0	0	0	3	2	7	−5	0	

Source: EFL.com

8 September 2020	Bolton Wanderers	2–3	Crewe Alexandra	University of Bolton Stadium
19:00 BST	Delaney 53'; Miller 75'	Report	Mandron 15', 89' (pen.); Dale 66'	Attendance: 0 Referee: Anthony Backhouse

22 September 2020	Shrewsbury Town	3–0	Newcastle United U21	New Meadow
17:30 BST	High 11'; Barnett 18'; Cummings 55'	Report		Attendance: 0 Referee: Scott Oldham

29 September 2020	Crewe Alexandra	1–0	Newcastle United U21	Gresty Road
19:00 BST	Pickering 66'	Report		Attendance: 0 Referee: Robert Lewis

6 October 2020	Shrewsbury Town	2–1	Bolton Wanderers	New Meadow
19:00 BST	Barnett 19'; Cummings 43'		Senior 64'	Attendance: 0

10 November 2020	Crewe Alexandra	3–4	Shrewsbury Town	Gresty Road
19:00 GMT	Powell 34', 60'; Zanzala 40'		Millar 17'; Tracey 25', 76', 82'	Attendance: 0

17 November 2020	Bolton Wanderers	3–2	Newcastle United U21	University of Bolton Stadium
19:00 GMT	Hickman 43'; Gnahoua 69'; Mascoll 85'		Anderson 11', 40'	Attendance: 0

==== Group D ====
Pos	Div	Team	Pld	W	PW	PL	L	GF	GA	GD	Pts	Qualification
1	L2	Port Vale	3	2	1	0	0	7	3	+4	8	Advance to Round 2
2	L2	Tranmere Rovers	3	1	1	1	0	5	4	+1	6	Advance to Round 2
3	L1	Wigan Athletic	3	1	0	1	1	9	6	+3	4	
4	ACA	Liverpool U21	3	0	0	0	3	5	13	−8	0	

Source: EFL.com

8 September 2020	Port Vale	0–0 (4–3 p)	Tranmere Rovers	Vale Park
19:00 BST		Report		Attendance: 0 Referee: Declan Bourne
	Penalties
	Whitehead (penalty scored); Cullen (penalty scored); Conlon (penalty missed); Trickett-Smith (penalty missed); Rodney (penalty scored); Fitzpatrick (penalty scored)		Banks (penalty scored); Khan (penalty missed); Morris (penalty scored); O'Connor (penalty scored); Payne (penalty missed); Walker-Rice (penalty missed)

22 September 2020	Wigan Athletic	6–1	Liverpool U21	DW Stadium
19:45 BST	Naismith 47'; Jolley 59', 66'; Crankshaw 79', 90'; Garner 81' (pen.)	Report	Clarkson 44'	Attendance: 0 Referee: Andy Haines

29 September 2020	Tranmere Rovers	3–2	Liverpool U21	Prenton Park
19:00 BST	Vaughan 74', 75'; Payne 90'	Report	Cain 50'; Longstaff 83'	Attendance: 0 Referee: Scott Oldham

6 October 2020	Wigan Athletic	1–3	Port Vale	DW Stadium
19:45 BST	Pearce 79'	Report	Robinson 13', 30'; Montaño 55'	Attendance: 0 Referee: Samuel Barrott

10 November 2020	Port Vale	4–2	Liverpool U21	Vale Park
19:00 GMT	Cullen 12'; Hurst 19'; McKirdy 61'; Rodney 64'	Report	Millar 11', 34'	Attendance: 0 Referee: Thomas Bramall

11 November 2020	Tranmere Rovers	2–2 (3–1 p)	Wigan Athletic	Birkenhead
18:30 GMT	Woolery 45+1'; Morris 72'	Report	Keane 19'; McHugh 45+3'	Stadium: Prenton Park; Attendance: 0 Referee: Ben Speedie
	Penalties
	Ferrier (penalty missed); Lloyd (penalty scored); Smith (penalty missed); Banks (penalty scored); Morris (penalty scored)		James (penalty scored); Joseph (penalty missed); Perry (penalty missed); Crankshaw (penalty missed)

==== Group E ====
Pos	Div	Team	Pld	W	PW	PL	L	GF	GA	GD	Pts	Qualification
1	ACA	Manchester City U21	3	2	0	1	0	8	1	+7	7	Advance to Round 2
2	L1	Lincoln City	3	1	2	0	0	5	3	+2	7	Advance to Round 2
3	L2	Mansfield Town	3	1	0	0	2	3	7	−4	3	
4	L2	Scunthorpe United	3	0	0	1	2	2	7	−5	1	

Source: EFL.com

8 September 2020	Mansfield Town	0–3	Manchester City U21	Field Mill
18:00 BST		Report	Bernabé 25'; Delap 89', 90+1'	Attendance: 0 Referee: Tom Nield

8 September 2020	Lincoln City	1–1 (4–2 p)	Scunthorpe United	Sincil Bank
19:00 BST	Anderson 80'	Report	Cordner 38'	Attendance: 0 Referee: James Oldham
	Penalties
	Howarth (penalty scored); Montsma (penalty scored); Scully (penalty scored); Jones (penalty scored)		Jarvis (penalty missed); Vincent (penalty scored); Hippolyte (penalty missed); Gilliead (penalty scored)

29 September 2020	Scunthorpe United	0–4	Manchester City U21	Glanford Park
19:00 BST		Report	Knight 17', 63'; Edozie 58', 66'	Attendance: 0 Referee: James Adcock

6 October 2020	Mansfield Town	1–3	Lincoln City	Field Mill
19:00 BST	Menayese 72'	Report	Soule 31'; Scully 49'; Archibald 62'	Attendance: 0

10 November 2020	Scunthorpe United	1–2	Mansfield Town	Glanford Park
19:00 GMT	Olomola 78'		Sweeney 34' Reid 44'	Attendance: 0

17 November 2020	Lincoln City	1–1 (4–3 p)	Manchester City U21	Sincil Bank
19:00 GMT	Anderson 76'		Simmonds 89'	Attendance: 0
	Penalties
	Archibald (penalty scored); Anderson (penalty scored); Gotts (penalty scored); Jones (penalty missed); Grant (penalty scored)		Bernabé (penalty scored); Nmecha (penalty scored); Lavia (penalty scored); Gyabi (penalty missed); Simmonds (penalty missed)

==== Group F ====
Pos	Div	Team	Pld	W	PW	PL	L	GF	GA	GD	Pts	Qualification
1	L2	Oldham Athletic	3	3	0	0	0	9	1	+8	9	Advance to Round 2
2	ACA	Wolverhampton Wanderers U21	3	1	1	0	1	3	6	−3	5	Advance to Round 2
3	L2	Bradford City	3	0	0	2	1	2	4	−2	2	
4	L1	Doncaster Rovers	3	0	1	0	2	1	4	−3	2	

Source: EFL.com

8 September 2020	Doncaster Rovers	0–0 (4–1 p)	Bradford City	Keepmoat Stadium
19:30 BST		Report		Attendance: 0 Referee: Seb Stockbridge
	Penalties
	Whiteman (penalty scored); Okenabirhie (penalty scored); Coppinger (penalty scored); Williams (penalty scored)		Guthrie (penalty scored); Pritchard (penalty missed); Longridge (penalty missed)

15 September 2020	Oldham Athletic	4–0	Wolverhampton Wanderers U21	Boundary Park
19:45 BST	Rowe 42'; Grant 85'; McAleny 88', 90+1'	Report		Attendance: 0 Referee: Graham Salisbury

6 October 2020	Bradford City	1–1 (3–5 p)	Wolverhampton Wanderers U21	Valley Parade
19:30 BST	Donaldson 83'	Report	Samuels 61'	Attendance: 0
	Penalties
	Pritchard (penalty scored); Hosannah (penalty scored); Shanks (penalty missed); Scales (penalty scored)		Samuels (penalty scored); Hoever (penalty scored); Shabani (penalty scored); Corbeanu (penalty scored); Sanderson (penalty scored)

6 October 2020	Oldham Athletic	2–0	Doncaster Rovers	Boundary Park
19:45 BST	Rowe 66'; Dearnley 86'			Attendance: 0

10 November 2020	Doncaster Rovers	1–2	Wolverhampton Wanderers U21	Keepmoat Stadium
19:00 GMT	Okenabirhie 23' (pen.)		Silva 15', 88'	Attendance: 0

10 November 2020	Bradford City	1–3	Oldham Athletic	Valley Parade
19:30 GMT	Sutton 60'		Keillor-Dunn 7'; Mccalmont 84', 90'	Attendance: 0

==== Group G ====
Pos	Div	Team	Pld	W	PW	PL	L	GF	GA	GD	Pts	Qualification
1	L1	Accrington Stanley	3	2	1	0	0	9	1	+8	8	Advance to Round 2
2	L1	Blackpool	3	1	1	1	0	4	1	+3	6	Advance to Round 2
3	L2	Barrow	3	0	1	1	1	2	3	−1	3	
4	ACA	Leeds United U21	3	0	0	1	2	2	12	−10	1	

Source: EFL.com

8 September 2020	Accrington Stanley	7–0	Leeds United U21	Crown Ground
19:00 BST	Uwakwe 5', 22', 72'; Burgess 14'; Charles 30'; Cassidy 38', 55'	Report		Attendance: 0 Referee: Ben Toner

8 September 2020	Blackpool	0–0 (5–3 p)	Barrow	Bloomfield Road
19:00 BST		Report		Attendance: 0 Referee: Martin Coy
	Penalties
	Yates (penalty scored); Lubala (penalty scored); Anderson (penalty scored); Ward (penalty scored); Kemp (penalty scored)		Quigley (penalty scored); Brown (penalty missed); Gribbin (penalty scored); Taylor (penalty scored)

5 October 2020	Barrow	2–2 (4–3 p)	Leeds United U21	Holker Street
19:45 BST	Angus 62'; Taylor 80'	Report	Dean 11', 38'	Attendance: 0 Referee: Marc Edwards
	Penalties
	Angus (penalty scored); James (penalty scored); Taylor (penalty missed); Hird (penalty missed); Kay (penalty scored); Taylor (penalty scored)		Summerville (penalty scored); Shackleton (penalty missed); Galloway (penalty scored); Gibbon (penalty missed); Dean (penalty scored); Jenkins (penalty missed)

6 October 2020	Accrington Stanley	1–1 (4–3 p)	Blackpool	Crown Ground
19:00 BST	Bishop 79'	Report	Anderson 10'	Attendance: 0 Referee: Ben Speedie
	Penalties
	Bishop (penalty missed); Charles (penalty scored); Sykes (penalty scored); Pritchard (penalty scored); Scully (penalty scored)		Yates (penalty scored); Robson (penalty scored); Anderson (penalty scored); Ward (penalty missed); Kemp (penalty missed)

10 November 2020	Barrow	0–1	Accrington Stanley	Holker Street
19:45 GMT			Mansell 4'	Attendance: 0 Referee: James Bell

11 November 2020	Blackpool	3–0	Leeds United U21	Bloomfield Road
19:45 GMT	Kemp 9' Drameh 20' (o.g.) Robson 82'			Attendance: 0

==== Group H ====
Pos	Div	Team	Pld	W	PW	PL	L	GF	GA	GD	Pts	Qualification
1	L1	Hull City	3	2	0	0	1	6	2	+4	6	Advance to Round 2
2	ACA	Leicester City U21	3	2	0	0	1	6	5	+1	6	Advance to Round 2
3	L2	Harrogate Town	3	1	0	1	1	5	5	0	4	
4	L2	Grimsby Town	3	0	1	0	2	3	8	−5	2	

Source: EFL.com

8 September 2020	Hull City	1–2	Leicester City U21	KCOM Stadium
17:30 BST	Lewis-Potter 66'	Report	Wright 50'; Hirst 90+5'	Attendance: 0 Referee: Ross Joyce

8 September 2020	Grimsby Town	2–2 (5–4 p)	Harrogate Town	Blundell Park
19:45 BST	Gibson 36' (pen.); Boyd 74'; Khouri (red card) 90'	Report	Kiernan 81'; Lokko 86'	Attendance: 0 Referee: David Hunt
	Penalties
	Gibson (penalty scored); Taylor (penalty scored); Edwards (penalty scored); Starbuck (penalty scored); Jackson Jr (penalty scored)		Thomson (penalty scored); Martin (penalty scored); Beck (penalty scored); Burrell (penalty scored); Kerry (penalty missed)

6 October 2020	Harrogate Town	3–1	Leicester City U21	Keepmoat Stadium (Note: Match played at Keepmoat Stadium in Doncaster due to ongoing pitch renovations at Wetherby Road.)
19:45 BST	Stead 16'; Jones 20'; Kiernan 58'		Suengchitthawon 84'	Attendance: 0

10 November 2020	Grimsby Town	1–3	Leicester City U21	Blundell Park
19:45 GMT	Pollock 3'		Wright 58'; Tavares 60'; Muskwe 74'	Attendance: 0

10 November 2020	Harrogate Town	0–2	Hull City	Wetherby Road
19:45 GMT			Scott 75' C. Jones 85' (pen.)	Attendance: 0

17 November 2020	Hull City	3–0	Grimsby Town	KCOM Stadium
19:45 BST	Samuelsen 27', 32'; Scott 79'			Attendance: 0

=== Southern Section ===
==== Group A ====
Pos	Div	Team	Pld	W	PW	PL	L	GF	GA	GD	Pts	Qualification
1	ACA	West Ham United U21	3	3	0	0	0	5	1	+4	9	Advance to Round 2
2	L1	Portsmouth	3	2	0	0	1	5	1	+4	6	Advance to Round 2
3	L2	Colchester United	3	1	0	0	2	6	4	+2	3	
4	L2	Southend United	3	0	0	0	3	2	12	−10	0	

Source: EFL.com

8 September 2020	Southend United	1–3	West Ham United U21	Roots Hall
17:30 BST	Humphrys 13'	Report	Odubeko 2', 84'; Coventry 90+1'	Attendance: 0 Referee: David Rock

8 September 2020	Portsmouth	2–0	Colchester United	Fratton Park
19:00 BST	Harness 37', 38'	Report		Attendance: 0 Referee: Craig Hick

29 September 2020	Colchester United	0–1	West Ham United U21	Colchester Community Stadium
19:00 BST		Report	Coventry 61'	Attendance: 0 Referee: Sam Purkiss

6 October 2020	Southend United	0–3	Portsmouth	Roots Hall
19:45 BST			Marquis 21' (pen.); Curtis 40', 77'	Attendance: 0

10 November 2020	Colchester United	6–1	Southend United	Colchester Community Stadium
19:30 GMT	Brown 16', 38', 57' (pen.); Folivi 62'; Chilvers 70'; Poku 83'		Sterling 90+2'	Attendance: 0

10 November 2020	Portsmouth	0–1	West Ham United U21	Fratton Park
19:45 GMT			Corbett 4'	Attendance: 0

==== Group B ====
Pos	Div	Team	Pld	W	PW	PL	L	GF	GA	GD	Pts	Qualification
1	ACA	Arsenal U21	3	2	1	0	0	5	3	+2	8	Advance to Round 2
2	L1	Gillingham	3	1	0	1	1	3	4	−1	4	Advance to Round 2
3	L2	Crawley Town	3	1	0	0	2	4	4	0	3	
4	L1	Ipswich Town	3	1	0	0	2	3	4	−1	3	

Source: EFL.com

8 September 2020	Gillingham	2–1	Crawley Town	Priestfield Stadium
17:30 BST	Coyle 40'; Oliver 50'	Report	Ferguson 78'	Attendance: 0 Referee: Paul Howard

8 September 2020	Ipswich Town	1–2	Arsenal U21	Portman Road
19:45 BST	Nolan 26'	Report	Lewis 45+1'; Balogun 54'	Attendance: 0 Referee: Neil Hair

6 October 2020	Ipswich Town	2–0	Gillingham	Portman Road
19:00 BST	Dobra 57'; Folami 75'	Report		Attendance: 0 Referee: Charles Breakspear

13 October 2020	Crawley Town	1–2	Arsenal U21	Broadfield Stadium
19:45 BST	Watters 37'	Report	McEneff 15'; Azeez 55'	Attendance: 0 Referee: Alan Young

10 November 2020	Crawley Town	2–0	Ipswich Town	Broadfield Stadium
19:00 GMT	Galach 17', 55'	Report		Attendance: 0 Referee: Sam Purkiss

10 November 2020	Gillingham	1–1 (2–4 p)	Arsenal U21	Priestfield Stadium
19:00 GMT	Coyle 56'	Report	Cîrjan 6'	Attendance: 0 Referee: Will Finnie
	Penalties
	Coyle (penalty scored); Samuel (penalty missed); McKenzie (penalty missed); Eccles (penalty scored)		Balogun (penalty scored); Möller (penalty scored); Cottrell (penalty scored); Cîrjan (penalty scored)

==== Group C ====
Pos	Div	Team	Pld	W	PW	PL	L	GF	GA	GD	Pts	Qualification
1	L1	Milton Keynes Dons	3	2	0	0	1	7	5	+2	6	Advance to Round 2
2	L1	Northampton Town	3	1	1	0	1	6	3	+3	5	Advance to Round 2
3	L2	Stevenage	3	1	0	1	1	4	4	0	4	
4	ACA	Southampton U21	3	1	0	0	2	3	8	−5	3	

Source: EFL.com

8 September 2020	Milton Keynes Dons	3–1	Northampton Town	Stadium MK
19:00 BST	Poole 34'; Nombe 74'; Sorinola 77'	Report	Mills 13'	Attendance: 0 Referee: Christopher Pollard

22 September 2020	Stevenage	2–1	Southampton U21	Broadhall Way
19:45 BST	Dinanga 45+3'; Marsh 90+2'	Report	Slattery 37'	Attendance: 0 Referee: Alan Young

6 October 2020	Northampton Town	5–0	Southampton U21	Sixfields Stadium
19:45 BST	Mills 7'; Marshall 40'; Ashley-Seal 46', 58'; Chukwuemeka 50'			Attendance: 0

6 October 2020	Stevenage	2–3	Milton Keynes Dons	Broadhall Way
19:45 BST	Thompson 45+1' (o.g.); Effiong 68'		Morris 32'; Bird 38', 84'	Attendance: 0

11 November 2020	Milton Keynes Dons	1–2	Southampton U21	Stadium MK
19:45 GMT	Sorinola 46'		Bellis 22'; Olaigbe 90+3'	Attendance: 0

17 November 2020	Northampton Town	0–0 (4–2 p)	Stevenage	Sixfields Stadium
19:30 GMT				Attendance: 0
	Penalties
	Lines (penalty scored); Rose (penalty missed); McWilliams (penalty scored); Horsfall (penalty scored); Chukwuemeka (penalty scored)		Newton (penalty missed); Carter (penalty scored); Marsh (penalty scored); Akinwande (penalty missed)

==== Group D ====
Pos	Div	Team	Pld	W	PW	PL	L	GF	GA	GD	Pts	Qualification
1	L1	Oxford United	3	2	1	0	0	4	2	+2	8	Advance to Round 2
2	L1	Bristol Rovers	3	1	0	2	0	7	6	+1	5	Advance to Round 2
3	L2	Walsall	3	0	1	1	1	3	4	−1	3	
4	ACA	Chelsea U21	3	0	1	0	2	5	7	−2	2	

Source: EFL.com

8 September 2020	Bristol Rovers	2–2 (2–4 p)	Walsall	Memorial Stadium
19:45 BST	Mehew 16' Ayunga 71'		Jules 29' Gordon 64'	Attendance: 0
	Penalties
	Kelly (penalty missed); Harries (penalty missed); Hare (penalty scored); Ayunga (penalty scored)		Norman (penalty scored); McDonald (penalty scored); Holden (penalty missed); Lavery (penalty scored); Gordon (penalty scored)

8 September 2020	Oxford United	2–1	Chelsea U21	Kassam Stadium
19:45 BST	Agyei 17'; Osei 45+2'	Report	Russell 53'	Attendance: 0 Referee: Trevor Kettle

29 September 2020	Walsall	1–1 (3–5 p)	Chelsea U21	Bescot Stadium
19:45 BST	McDonald 53'	Report	Simeu 69'	Attendance: 0 Referee: Brett Huxtable
	Penalties
	Norman (penalty missed); Holden (penalty scored); Adebayo (penalty scored); Lavery (penalty scored)		Russell (penalty scored); Flabema (penalty scored); Ballo (penalty scored); Simeu (penalty scored); Maatsen (penalty scored)

6 October 2020	Oxford United	1–1 (4–3 p)	Bristol Rovers	Kassam Stadium
19:00 BST	Osei 89'	Report	Mehew 12'	Attendance: 0 Referee: Neil Hair
	Penalties
	Osei (penalty scored); Agyei (penalty missed); McGuane (penalty scored); Hall (penalty scored); Brannagan (penalty scored)		Leahy (penalty scored); Upson (penalty missed); Hare (penalty scored); Hargreaves (penalty scored); Baldwin (penalty missed)

10 November 2020	Walsall	0–1	Oxford United	Bescot Stadium
19:45 GMT			Osei 87'	Attendance: 0

18 November 2020	Bristol Rovers	4–3	Chelsea U21	Memorial Stadium
19:45 GMT	Hanlan 9'; Nicholson 15'; Westbrooke 57'; Hare 90'		Anjorin 10', 68'; Lewis 63'	Attendance: 0

==== Group E ====
Pos	Div	Team	Pld	W	PW	PL	L	GF	GA	GD	Pts	Qualification
1	L2	Exeter City	3	3	0	0	0	11	5	+6	9	Advance to Round 2
2	L2	Forest Green Rovers	3	1	0	0	2	5	4	+1	3	Advance to Round 2
3	L1	Swindon Town	3	1	0	0	2	6	7	−1	3	
4	ACA	West Bromwich Albion U21	3	1	0	0	2	3	9	−6	3	

Source: EFL.com

8 September 2020	Exeter City	3–2	Forest Green Rovers	St James Park
17:30 BST	Ajose 45+1'; Jay 57'; Key 67'	Report	Stevens 5', 51'	Attendance: 0 Referee: Sam Allison

8 September 2020	Swindon Town	2–3	West Bromwich Albion U21	County Ground
19:45 BST	Smith 72'; Caddis 75'	Report	Dyce 27'; Windsor 47'; Gardner-Hickman 74'	Attendance: 0 Referee: Chris Sarginson

6 October 2020	Forest Green Rovers	3–0	West Bromwich Albion U21	The New Lawn
19:45 BST	Stokes 17'; Stevens 19'; Young 29'			Attendance: 0

6 October 2020	Swindon Town	3–4	Exeter City	County Ground
19:00 BST	Smith 61', 85'; Palmer 90+3'		Kite 4'; Seymour 7' (pen.); Atangana 63'; Hartridge 68'	Attendance: 0

10 November 2020	Forest Green Rovers	0–1	Swindon Town	The New Lawn
19:00 GMT			Broadbent 90+3'	Attendance: 0

17 November 2020	Exeter City	4–0	West Bromwich Albion U21	St James Park
19:45 GMT	Kite 27'; Seymour 48'; Sparkes 60'; Law 84'			Attendance: 0

==== Group F ====
Pos	Div	Team	Pld	W	PW	PL	L	GF	GA	GD	Pts	Qualification
1	L2	Cheltenham Town	3	3	0	0	0	4	0	+4	9	Advance to Round 2
2	ACA	Norwich City U21	3	2	0	0	1	8	3	+5	6	Advance to Round 2
3	L1	Plymouth Argyle	3	1	0	0	2	5	6	−1	3	
4	L2	Newport County	3	0	0	0	3	1	9	−8	0	

Source: EFL.com

8 September 2020	Newport County	0–1	Cheltenham Town	Rodney Parade
19:00 BST		Report	Reid 70'	Attendance: 0 Referee: James Adcock

8 September 2020	Plymouth Argyle	2–3	Norwich City U21	Home Park
19:45 BST	Lolos 39' (pen.); Telford 63'	Report	Hondermarck 26'; Omotoye 54'; Dennis 67'	Attendance: 0 Referee: Andy Davies

6 October 2020	Newport County	0–5	Norwich City U21	Rodney Parade
19:00 BST			Omotoye 2', 49', 75'; Dennis 77'; Martin 83' (pen.)	Attendance: 0

6 October 2020	Cheltenham Town	2–0	Plymouth Argyle	Whaddon Road
19:45 BST	Reid 56', 77'			Attendance: 0

10 November 2020	Plymouth Argyle	3–1	Newport County	Home Park
19:00 GMT	Reeves 30'; Cooper 48', 59'		Amond 64'	Attendance: 0

10 November 2020	Cheltenham Town	1–0	Norwich City U21	Whaddon Road
19:00 GMT	Lloyd 67'			Attendance: 0

==== Group G ====
Pos	Div	Team	Pld	W	PW	PL	L	GF	GA	GD	Pts	Qualification
1	L2	Leyton Orient	3	2	0	0	1	6	5	+1	6	Advance to Round 2
2	L1	AFC Wimbledon	3	2	0	0	1	4	3	+1	6	Advance to Round 2
3	L1	Charlton Athletic	3	1	1	0	1	5	4	+1	5	
4	ACA	Brighton & Hove Albion U21	3	0	0	1	2	3	6	−3	1	

Source: EFL.com

1 September 2020	AFC Wimbledon	2–1	Charlton Athletic	Loftus Road (Note: Match played at Loftus Road in White City, London due to ongoing construction at Plough Lane.)
17:30 BST	Roscrow 46'; Thomas 58'	Report	Oztumer 21'	Attendance: 0 Referee: Carl Brook

8 September 2020	Leyton Orient	3–2	Brighton & Hove Albion U21	Brisbane Road
19:00 BST	Ling 36'; Johnson 55'; Wilkinson 90+5'	Report	Wilson 84', 88'	Attendance: 0 Referee: Sam Purkiss

22 September 2020	AFC Wimbledon	2–0	Brighton & Hove Albion U21	Broadfield Stadium (Note: Match played at Broadfield Stadium in Crawley due to ongoing construction at Plough Lane.)
18:00 BST	Robinson 20'; Roscrow 87'	Report		Attendance: 0 Referee: Craig Hicks

30 September 2020	Charlton Athletic	1–1 (4–1 p)	Brighton & Hove Albion U21	The Valley
19:00 BST	Morgan 48'	Report	Lapslie 30' (o.g.)	Attendance: 0 Referee: Lee Swabey
	Penalties
	Vennings (penalty scored); Morgan (penalty scored); Henry (penalty scored); Davison (penalty scored)		Spong (penalty missed); Yapi (penalty scored); Vukoje (penalty missed)

6 October 2020	Leyton Orient	2–0	AFC Wimbledon	Brisbane Road
19:00 BST	Angol 33'; Wilkinson 74'	Report		Attendance: 0 Referee: Sam Allison

10 November 2020	Charlton Athletic	3–1	Leyton Orient	The Valley
19:00 GMT	Aouachria 12'; Mingi 64'; Maddison 74'	Report	Dennis 67'	Attendance: 0 Referee: Charles Breakspear

==== Group H ====
Pos	Div	Team	Pld	W	PW	PL	L	GF	GA	GD	Pts	Qualification
1	L2	Cambridge United	3	2	1	0	0	7	3	+4	8	Advance to Round 2
2	L1	Peterborough United	3	1	1	1	0	8	6	+2	6	Advance to Round 2
3	L1	Burton Albion	3	0	1	1	1	6	8	−2	3	
4	ACA	Fulham U21	3	0	0	1	2	3	7	−4	1	

Source: EFL.com

8 September 2020	Peterborough United	3–3 (5–4 p)	Burton Albion	London Road Stadium
19:00 BST	Clarke 3'; Reed 23'; Mason 68'	Report	Lawless 44'; Powell 52', 55'	Attendance: 0 Referee: Will Finnie
	Penalties
	Burrows (penalty scored); Hamilton (penalty scored); Reed (penalty scored); Eisa (penalty scored); Clarke (penalty scored)		Bostwick (penalty scored); Fox (penalty scored); Powell (penalty scored); O'Toole (penalty scored); Gilligan (penalty missed)

8 September 2020	Cambridge United	2–0	Fulham U21	Abbey Stadium
19:45 BST	Knowles 24'; Mullin 84'	Report		Attendance: 862; Referee: Darren Drysdale

6 October 2020	Burton Albion	2–4	Cambridge United	Pirelli Stadium
19:45 BST	Akins 3'; Powell 4'	Report	Knibbs 27'; Hannant 31', 86'; Darling 79'	Attendance: 0 Referee: Ross Joyce

6 October 2020	Peterborough United	4–2	Fulham U21	London Road Stadium
19:45 BST	Eisa 24'; Szmodics 49'; Clarke 56'; Boyd 76'	Report	Harris 52'; Tiehi 72'	Attendance: 0 Referee: Trevor Kettle

10 November 2020	Burton Albion	1–1 (4–1 p)	Fulham U21	Pirelli Stadium
19:45 GMT	Edwards 34'	Report	Hemmings 10' (o.g.)	Attendance: 0 Referee: Robert Lewis
	Penalties
	Hemmings (penalty scored); Lawless (penalty scored); Hart (penalty scored); Gilligan (penalty scored)		Biereth (penalty missed); Harris (penalty missed); Pajaziti (penalty scored)

10 November 2020	Cambridge United	1–1 (3–1 p)	Peterborough United	Abbey Stadium
19:45 GMT	Worman 86'	Report	Clarke 48'	Attendance: 0 Referee: John Busby
	Penalties
	Dunk (penalty scored); Knowles (penalty scored); Dallas (penalty scored)		Burrows (penalty missed); Hamilton (penalty scored); Tasdemir (penalty missed); Eisa (penalty missed)

== Round 2 ==
=== Northern section ===
8 December 2020	Hull City	0–0 (3–2 p)	Crewe Alexandra	Kingston upon Hull
17:30 GMT		Report		Stadium: KCOM Stadium; Attendance: 0
	Penalties
	Docherty (penalty missed); Chadwick (penalty scored); Coyle (penalty scored); Wilks (penalty missed); Adelakun (penalty scored)		Porter (penalty scored); Finney (penalty missed); Griffiths (penalty missed); Zanzala (penalty missed); Ng (penalty scored)

8 December 2020	Shrewsbury Town	1–4	Lincoln City	Shrewsbury
19:00 GMT	Tracey 44'	Report	Scully 18'; Elbouzedi 40'; Howarth 67'; Grant 78' (pen.)	Stadium: New Meadow; Attendance: 200

8 December 2020	Salford City	3–3 (5–6 p)	Leicester City U21	Salford
19:00 GMT	Thomas-Asante 24'; Dieseruvwe 55', 78'	Report	Muskwe 64', 69'; Flynn 83'	Stadium: Moor Lane; Attendance: 0
	Penalties
	Dieseruvwe (penalty missed); Loughlan (penalty scored); Smith (penalty scored); Campbell (penalty scored); Thomas-Asante (penalty scored); Hawkins (penalty scored); Fielding (penalty missed)		Wright (penalty scored); Hulme (penalty scored); Reghba (penalty missed); Muskwe (penalty scored); Suengchitthawon (penalty scored); McAteer (penalty scored); Leshabela (penalty scored)

8 December 2020	Port Vale	2–1	Wolverhampton Wanderers U21	Burslem
19:00 GMT	McKirdy 30'; Mills 80'	Report	Perry 20'	Stadium: Vale Park; Attendance: 0

8 December 2020	Tranmere Rovers	2–1	Manchester City U21	Birkenhead
19:00 GMT	Lloyd 27'; Banks 88' (pen.)	Report	Delap 17'	Stadium: Prenton Park; Attendance: 0

8 December 2020	Accrington Stanley	3–2	Manchester United U21	Accrington
19:00 GMT	Burgess 8'; Pritchard 67', 85'	Report	Pellistri 39'; Elanga 61'	Stadium: Crown Ground; Attendance: 0 Referee: Thomas Bramall

8 December 2020	Oldham Athletic	1–2	Sunderland	Oldham
19:00 GMT	Grant 13'	Report	Maguire 30'; Scowen 64'	Stadium: Boundary Park; Attendance: 0

8 December 2020	Fleetwood Town	0–0 (5–4 p)	Blackpool	Fleetwood
19:45 GMT		Report		Stadium: Highbury Stadium; Attendance: 0
	Penalties
	Duffy (penalty scored); McKay (penalty scored); Evans (penalty scored); Madden (penalty scored); Coutts (penalty scored)		Lawrence-Gabriel (penalty scored); Lubala (penalty scored); Robson (penalty missed); Sarkic (penalty scored); Garbutt (penalty scored)

=== Southern section ===
8 December 2020	AFC Wimbledon	3–0	Arsenal U21	Wimbledon, London
18:00 GMT	Longman 67'; Osew 73'; Pigott 90+3'	Report		Stadium: Plough Lane; Attendance: 0 Referee: Christopher Pollard

8 December 2020	Milton Keynes Dons	6–0	Norwich City U21	Milton Keynes
19:00 GMT	Agard 33', 75'; Sørensen 56'; Poole 59', 80'; Walker 68'	Report		Stadium: Stadium MK; Attendance: 200; Referee: Will Finnie

8 December 2020	Peterborough United	3–0	West Ham United U21	Peterborough
19:00 GMT	Eisa 56', 83'; Tasdemir 71'	Report		Stadium: London Road Stadium; Attendance: 750; Referee: Paul Howard

8 December 2020	Oxford United	1–1 (4–1 p)	Forest Green Rovers	Oxford
19:00 GMT	Shodipo 64'	Report	Bailey 45+1'	Stadium: Kassam Stadium; Attendance: 1,036; Referee: Craig Hicks
	Penalties
	O'Donkor (penalty scored); Clare (penalty scored); Shodipo (penalty scored); Mousinho (penalty scored)		Collins (penalty missed); Bailey (penalty scored); Godwin-Malife (penalty missed)

8 December 2020	Exeter City	1–2	Northampton Town	Exeter
19:00 GMT	Atangana 51'	Report	Rose 22'; Ashley-Seal 82'	Stadium: St James Park; Attendance: 714; Referee: Carl Brook

8 December 2020	Cheltenham Town	0–3	Portsmouth	Cheltenham
19:00 GMT		Report	Mnoga 15'; Hiwula 29', 50'	Stadium: Whaddon Road; Attendance: 718; Referee: Kevin Johnson

8 December 2020	Leyton Orient	1–2	Bristol Rovers	Leyton, London
19:00 GMT	Baldwin 26' (o.g.)	Report	Koiki 12'; Sargeant 29' (o.g.)	Stadium: Brisbane Road; Attendance: 574; Referee: Alan Young

8 December 2020	Cambridge United	2–0	Gillingham	Cambridge
19:45 GMT	Mullin 67' (pen.); Hannant 79'	Report		Stadium: Abbey Stadium; Attendance: 724; Referee: David Rock

== Round 3 ==
=== Northern section ===
12 January 2021	Sunderland	2–0	Port Vale	Sunderland
18:00 GMT	O'Brien 21'; McGeady 90+7' (pen.)			Stadium: Stadium of Light; Attendance: 0 Referee: Declan Bourne

12 January 2021	Lincoln City	4–0	Accrington Stanley	Lincoln
19:00 GMT	Elbouzedi 32'; Gotts 53'; Johnson 62'; Grant 90+2'			Stadium: Sincil Bank; Attendance: 0 Referee: Chris Sarginson

12 January 2021	Hull City	3–2	Fleetwood Town	Kingston upon Hull
17:30 GMT	Wilks 78'; Lewis-Potter 80'; Coyle 90+4'		Madden 8'; Burns 53'	Stadium: KCOM Stadium; Attendance: 0 Referee: Ross Joyce

13 January 2021	Tranmere Rovers	4–2	Leicester City U21	Birkenhead
19:30 GMT	Ferrier 4'; Lloyd 37', 45+1'; Blackett-Taylor 53'		Wakeling 36'; Suengchitthawon 56'	Stadium: Prenton Park; Attendance: 0 Referee: Marc Edwards

=== Southern section ===
12 January 2021	Bristol Rovers	0–1	AFC Wimbledon	Bristol
19:00 GMT			Rudoni 61'	Stadium: Memorial Stadium; Attendance: 0 Referee: John Busby

12 January 2021	Northampton Town	0–2	Milton Keynes Dons	Northampton
19:45 GMT			Walker 27', 83' (pen.)	Stadium: Sixfields Stadium; Attendance: 0 Referee: Craig Hicks

12 January 2021	Oxford United	1–0	Cambridge United	Oxford
19:45 GMT	Hall 74'			Stadium: Kassam Stadium; Attendance: 0 Referee: Charles Breakspear

12 January 2021	Peterborough United	5–1	Portsmouth	Peterborough
19:45 GMT	Taylor 15'; Clarke-Harris 29'; Kent 45+1'; Dembélé 52'; Hamilton 87'		Harrison 90+2'	Stadium: London Road Stadium; Attendance: 0 Referee: Robert Lewis

== Quarter-finals ==
2 February 2021	Milton Keynes Dons	0–3	Sunderland	Milton Keynes
18:30 GMT		Report	Lewington 12' (o.g.); McGeady 76'; Wyke 82'	Stadium: Stadium MK; Attendance: 0 Referee: Thomas Bramall

2 February 2021	Tranmere Rovers	2–1	Peterborough United	Birkenhead
19:00 GMT	Lloyd 38'; Lewis 82'		Clarke-Harris 90+1' (pen.)	Stadium: Prenton Park; Attendance: 0

2 February 2021	Oxford United	3–1	AFC Wimbledon	Oxford
19:00 GMT	Winnall 13', 29'; Shodipo 52'		Chislett 78'	Stadium: Kassam Stadium; Attendance: 0

2 February 2021	Hull City	1–1 (3–4 p)	Lincoln City	Kingston upon Hull
19:45 GMT	Docherty 60'		Anderson 7'	Stadium: KCOM Stadium; Attendance: 0
	Penalties
	Smallwood (penalty missed); Scott (penalty missed); Chadwick (penalty scored); Lewis-Potter (penalty scored); Elder (penalty scored); Flores (penalty missed)		Jones (penalty scored); Montsma (penalty missed); Anderson (penalty missed); Scully (penalty scored); Grant (penalty scored); Johnson (penalty scored)

== Semi-finals ==
16 February 2021	Oxford United	0–2	Tranmere Rovers	Oxford
18:00 GMT		Report	Woolery 35'; Morris 66'	Stadium: Kassam Stadium; Attendance: 0 Referee: Craig Hicks

17 February 2021	Sunderland	1–1 (5–3 p)	Lincoln City	Sunderland
18:00 GMT	Wyke 75'	Report	Scully 64'	Stadium: Stadium of Light; Attendance: 0 Referee: Ben Toner
	Penalties
	Power (penalty scored); O'Nien (penalty scored); Maguire (penalty scored); McGeady (penalty scored); Leadbitter (penalty scored)		Scully (penalty scored); McGrandles (penalty scored); Howarth (penalty missed); Johnson (penalty scored)

== Final ==
14 March 2021
15:00 GMT

Sunderland	1–0	Tranmere Rovers
Gooch 57'	Report

Wembley Stadium, London
Attendance: 0
Referee: Charles Breakspear
