= Alhagi Touray Sisay =

Spanish footballer

Personal information
- Full name: Alhagi Marie Touray Sisay
- Date of birth: 31 December 1999 (age 26)
- Place of birth: Spain
- Height: 6 ft 4 in (1.93 m)
- Position: Striker

Youth career
- Llagostera

Senior career*
Years	Team	Apps	(Gls)
2018–2019	CF Santvicentí	31	(35)
2019	Ramsgate	1	(0)
2020	Aberystwyth Town	5	(4)
2020–2021	Grimsby Town	1	(0)
2020	→ Cleethorpes Town (loan)	4	(2)
2021–2022	Haverfordwest County	23	(11)
2022–2023	Accrington Stanley	3	(0)
2024	UE Vilassar de Mar		
2024–2025	CF Vilanova		
- * Club domestic league appearances and goals as of 18:39, 15 January 2023 (UTC)

Alhagi Marie Touray Sisay (born 31 December 1999), known as Touray, is a Spanish professional footballer who plays as a striker.

Touray came through the youth system at Llagostera before playing for CF Santvicentí. In 2019 he moved to the United Kingdom where he played for English Non-League side Ramsgate before a spell in the Cymru Premier for Aberystwyth Town. He turned professional with Grimsby Town of EFL League Two, and spent time back in Non-League with Cleethorpes Town.

== Career ==
=== Early career ===
Touray played for the youth team at Llagostera in the 2017–18 season, before moving on to CF Santvicentí in the Tercera Catalana, where he scored 35 goals in 31 games in the 2018–19 season. He also had trials with Scottish club Heart of Midlothian and English clubs Hull City and Stoke City.

After a brief spell at English non-league club Ramsgate, Touray moved to Welsh club Aberystwyth Town in January 2020, for whom he scored 4 goals in 5 league games, including one hat-trick.

=== Grimsby Town ===
In August 2020 moved to English club Grimsby Town. On 9 October 2020, Touray joined Cleethorpes Town on a one-month loan, along with Grimsby teammate Joey Hope. He scored on his debut in a 3–2 defeat against Leek Town. Touray returned to Grimsby and made his professional debut on 17 November 2020, appearing as a substitute in the EFL Trophy defeat away at Hull City. He made his league debut in a 3–1 defeat against Southend United on 15 December 2020, as a 79th minute replacement for Ira Jackson Jr.

On 1 February 2021, transfer deadline day, Grimsby attempted to loan Touray out once more, this time back to Wales with Connah's Quay Nomads. The transfer fell through due to a late application for international clearance with Mariners boss Paul Hurst commenting "I think it's probably become apparent already that he's going to find it difficult to break into this first team squad, and it would have been good for the lad to have gone and got some games."

On 12 May 2021 it was announced that Touray would leave Grimsby at the end of the season, following the expiry of his contract.

=== Haverfordwest County ===
On 18 August 2021, following his release from Grimsby, Touray returned to Wales to join Haverfordwest County. On 18 September 2021, he scored twice to give the club their first win of the season against Flint Town. After a spell out with injury Touray scored the winning goal on 30 October 2021 in a match against Newtown.

=== Accrington Stanley ===
On 25 July 2022, Touray signed for Accrington Stanley. On 5 July 2023, Touray left Accrington Stanley.

=== Return to Spain ===
In February 2024, Touray signed for UE Vilassar de Mar.

In the 2024–25 season, he was playing for CF Vilanova.

== Career statistics ==
As of 15 January 2023

Appearances and goals by club, season and competition
Club	Season	League			National Cup		League Cup		Other		Total	
Club	Season	Division	Apps	Goals	Apps	Goals	Apps	Goals	Apps	Goals	Apps	Goals
CF Santvicentí	2018–19	Tercera Catalana Group 4	31	35	0	0	–		0	0	31	35
Ramsgate	2019–20	IL South East Division	1	0	0	0	–		0	0	1	0
Aberystwyth Town	2019–20	Cymru Premier	5	4	1	0	0	0	0	0	6	4
Grimsby Town	2020–21	League Two	1	0	0	0	0	0	1 (Note: Appearance in EFL Trophy)	0	2	0
Cleethorpes Town (loan)	2020–21	NPL Division One South East	4	2	0	0	–		0	0	4	2
Haverfordwest County	2021–22	Cymru Premier	26	11	2	1	1	0	0	0	29	12
Accrington Stanley	2022–23	League One	3	0	0	0	0	0	1	0	4	0
Career total			71	51	3	1	1	0	2	0	77	52
