= 2020–21 Grimsby Town F.C. season =

Grimsby Town
2020–21 season
- Chairman: Philip Day
- Manager: Ian Holloway (until 23 December); Paul Hurst (from 30 December)
- Stadium: Blundell Park
- League Two: 24th (Relegated)
- FA Cup: First round
- EFL Cup: First round
- EFL Trophy: Group stage
- Top goalscorer: League: Ira Jackson Jr; Lenell John-Lewis; Mattie Pollock (3 each); All: Mattie Pollock (4 goals)
Home colours	Away colours	Third colours

The 2020–21 season is Grimsby Town's 143rd in existence and their fifth consecutive season in EFL League Two. Along with competing in League Two, the club will also participate in the FA Cup, EFL Cup and EFL Trophy.

The season covers the period from 1 July 2020 to 30 June 2021.

The team struggled through the course of the season with relegation to the National League confirmed on 27 April after a 3-2 loss to Exeter City F.C.

== Transfers ==
=== Transfers in ===
Date from	Position	Nationality	Name	From	Fee	Ref.
11 August 2020	CB	(Tunisia)	Bilel Mohsni	(Greece) Panachaiki	Free transfer	
11 August 2020	CF	(England)	Ira Jackson Jr	(England) Folkestone Invicta	Free transfer	
13 August 2020	CF	(England)	Montel Gibson	(England) Halesowen Town	Free transfer	
13 August 2020	AM	(Wales)	George Williams	(England) Forest Green Rovers	Free transfer	
14 August 2020	CF	(Spain)	Alhagi Touray Sisay	(Wales) Aberystwyth Town	Free transfer	
31 August 2020	CM	(England)	Danny Rose	(England) Swindon Town	Free transfer	
2 September 2020	RW	(Republic of Ireland)	Sean Scannell	(England) Blackpool	Free transfer	
5 September 2020	CM	(England)	Luke Spokes	(England) Taunton Town	Undisclosed	
11 December 2020	RW	(Portugal)	Filipe Morais	(England) Crawley Town	Free transfer	
8 January 2021	LB	(England)	Sam Habergham	Free agent	Free transfer	
25 January 2021	CF	(England)	Stefan Payne	(England) Tranmere Rovers	Free transfer	
1 February 2021	LB	(England)	Joe Bunney	(England) Hartlepool United	Free transfer	
1 February 2021	CF	(England)	Lenell John-Lewis	(England) Hereford	Undisclosed	
6 February 2021	LW	(France)	Julien Lamy	(England) Free agent	Free transfer	
12 February 2021	CM	(England)	Giles Coke	(England) Hereford	Free transfer	

=== Loans in ===
Date from	Position	Nationality	Name	From	Date until	Ref.
3 September 2020	DF	(England)	Danny Preston	(England) Nottingham Forest	1 February 2021	
5 September 2020	RW	(England)	Owura Edwards	(England) Bristol City	31 December 2020	
7 September 2020	DM	(Wales)	Terry Taylor	(England) Wolverhampton Wanderers	6 January 2021	
30 September 2020	DM	(England)	James Morton	(England) Bristol City	31 December 2020	
8 October 2020	LW	(England)	Kyle Bennett	(England) Bristol Rovers	End of season	
8 October 2020	CF	(England)	Owen Windsor	(England) West Bromwich Albion	20 December 2020	
16 October 2020	CF	(France)	Virgil Gomis	(England) Nottingham Forest	5 January 2021	
18 January 2021	CB	(Wales)	Rollin Menayese	(England) Mansfield Town	End of season	
21 January 2021	CM	(England)	Jay Matete	(England) Fleetwood Town	End of season	
29 January 2021	AM	(Tunisia)	Idris El Mizouni	(England) Ipswich Town	End of season	
1 February 2021	CM	(Wales)	Joe Adams	(England) Brentford	End of season	
1 February 2021	GK	(England)	Jake Eastwood	(England) Sheffield United	End of season	

=== Loans out ===
Date from	Position	Nationality	Name	To	Date until	Ref.
15 September 2020	CM	(England)	Jock Curran	(England) Spalding United	1 January 2021	
15 September 2020	MF	(England)	Cameron Painter	(England) Spalding United	December 2020	
9 October 2020	LB	(England)	Joey Hope	(England) Cleethorpes Town	November 2020	
9 October 2020	CF	(Spain)	Alhagi Touray Sisay	(England) Cleethorpes Town	9 November 2020	
24 December 2020	GK	(England)	Ollie Battersby	(England) Gateshead	29 December 2020	
1 March 2021	CF	(England)	Montel Gibson	(England) Altrincham	April 2021	

=== Transfers out ===
Date from	Position	Nationality	Name	To	Fee	Ref.
1 July 2020	LW	(England)	Brandon Buckley	(England) Cleethorpes Town	Released	
1 July 2020	CF	(Scotland)	Harry Cardwell	(England) Chorley	Released	
1 July 2020	SS	(England)	Jordan Cook	(England) Gateshead	Released	
1 July 2020	CB	(England)	Harry Davis	(England) Morecambe	Released	
1 July 2020	LB	(Republic of Ireland)	Bradley Garmston	Retired	Released	
1 July 2020	RW	(France)	Elliot Grandin	(France) Saint-Pierroise	Released	
1 July 2020	CM	(England)	Jake Hessenthaler	(England) Crawley Town	Released	
1 July 2020	LW	(Jamaica)	Ahkeem Rose	(England) Dover Athletic	Released	
1 July 2020	CM	(England)	Elliott Whitehouse	(England) Forest Green Rovers	Released	
17 July 2020	AM	(Republic of Ireland)	Billy Clarke	(England) Bradford City	Free transfer	
20 July 2020	AM	(England)	Charles Vernam	(England) Burton Albion	Free transfer	
21 November 2020	CB	(Sweden)	Ludvig Öhman	(Sweden) Falkenbergs FF	Released	
21 November 2020	CB	(Tunisia)	Bilel Mohsni	(England) Barnet	Released	
14 January 2021	RW	(England)	James Tilley	(England) Crawley Town	Mutual consent	
18 March 2021	LB	(England)	Joe Bunney	(England) Altrincham	Released	
30 March 2021	LB	(England)	Joey Hope	(England) Darlington	Released	

== First-team squad ==
#	Name	Nationality	Position	Date of birth (age)	Signed from (Last Club)	Signed in	Contract ends
Goalkeepers
1	James McKeown	(Republic of Ireland)	GK	24 July 1989 (aged 31)	RKSV Leonidas (Netherlands)	2011	2021
13	Ollie Battersby	(England)	GK	23 July 2001 (aged 19)	Academy	2017	2021
23	Sam Russell	(England)	GK	4 October 1982 (aged 37)	Forest Green Rovers (England)	2018	2023
44	Jake Eastwood	(England)	GK	3 October 1996 (aged 23)	Sheffield United (England) (Loan)	2021	2021
Defenders
2	Luke Hendrie	(England)	RB	27 August 1994 (aged 26)	Shrewsbury Town (England)	2019	2021
6	Luke Waterfall	(England)	CB	30 July 1990 (aged 30)	Shrewsbury Town (England)	2019	2021
22	Elliott Hewitt	(Wales)	RB / CM	30 May 1994 (aged 26)	Notts County (England)	2019	2021
25	Mattie Pollock	(England)	CB	28 September 2001 (aged 18)	Academy	2018	2021
26	Rollin Menayese	(Wales)	CB	4 December 1997 (aged 22)	Mansfield Town (England) (Loan)	2021	2021
32	Duncan Idehen	(England)	CB	3 July 2002 (aged 18)	Academy	2020	2021
35	Ben Grist	(England)	CB	???	Academy	2020	2021
36	Sam Habergham	(England)	LB	20 February 1992 (aged 28)	Lincoln City (England)	2021	2021
Midfielders
4	Danny Rose	(England)	CM	21 February 1988 (aged 32)	Swindon Town (England)	2020	2022
8	Giles Coke	(England)	CM	3 June 1986 (aged 34)	Hereford (England)	2021	2021
10	George Williams	(Wales)	AM / LW	7 September 1995 (aged 25)	Forest Green Rovers (England)	2020	2022
11	Sean Scannell	(Republic of Ireland)	RW	17 September 1990 (aged 29)	Blackpool (England)	2020	2022
14	Luke Spokes	(England)	CM	6 August 2000 (aged 20)	Taunton Town (England)	2020	2021
15	Harry Clifton	(Wales)	CM	12 June 1998 (aged 22)	Academy	2007	2021
18	Filipe Morais	(Portugal)	RW / LW	21 November 1985 (aged 34)	Crawley Town (England)	2020	2022
19	Max Wright	(England)	RW	6 April 1998 (aged 22)	Academy	2008	2022
20	Jay Matete	(England)	CM	11 February 2001 (aged 19)	Fleetwood Town (England) (Loan)	2021	2021
24	Jock Curran	(England)	CM	29 January 2001 (aged 19)	Academy	2019	2021
27	Harvey Tomlinson	(England)	AM	???	Academy	2020	2021
29	Joseph Starbuck	(England)	DM	2 August 2002 (aged 18)	Academy	2020	2022
30	Cameron Painter	(England)	CM	22 February 2002 (aged 18)	Academy	2020	2021
32	Evan Khouri	(England)	CM	21 January 2003 (aged 17)	West Ham (England)	2019	2021
34	Louis Boyd	(England)	CM	23 October 2004 (aged 15)	Academy	2020	2021
37	Kyle Bennett	(England)	LW	9 September 1990 (aged 30)	Bristol Rovers (England) (Loan)	2020	2021
38	Idris El Mizouni	(Tunisia)	CM / AM	26 September 2000 (aged 19)	Ipswich Town (England) (Loan)	2021	2021
39	Ben Davies	(England)	CM	27 May 1981 (aged 39)	Cleethorpes Town (England)	2020	2021
42	Julien Lamy	(France)	LW	6 November 1999 (aged 20)	Rotherham United (England)	2021	2021
45	Joe Adams	(Wales)	RW / CM / AM	13 February 2001 (aged 19)	Brentford (England) (Loan)	2021	2021
Attackers
7	Matt Green	(England)	ST	2 January 1987 (aged 33)	Salford City (England)	2019	2021
9	James Hanson	(England)	ST	9 November 1987 (aged 32)	AFC Wimbledon (England)	2019	2021
12	Montel Gibson	(England)	ST	15 December 1997 (aged 22)	Halesowen Town (England)	2020	2023
16	Ira Jackson Jr	(England)	ST	28 January 1997 (aged 23)	Folkestone Invicta (England)	2020	2022
17	Alhagi Touray Sisay	(Spain)	ST	???	Aberystwyth Town (Wales)	2020	2021
21	Lenell John-Lewis	(England)	ST	17 May 1989 (aged 31)	Hereford (England)	2021	2022
31	Luis Adlard	(England)	ST	13 October 2002 (aged 17)	Academy	2019	2021
40	Stefan Payne	(England)	ST	10 August 1991 (aged 29)	Tranmere Rovers (England)	2021	2021
Players departed during season
3	Danny Preston	(England)	LB	6 August 2000 (aged 20)	Nottingham Forest (England) (Loan)	2020	2021
3	Joe Bunney	(England)	LB	26 September 1993 (aged 26)	Hartlepool United (England)	2021	2021
5	Ludvig Öhman	(Sweden)	CB	9 October 1991 (aged 28)	BP (Sweden)	2019	2021
8	Owen Windsor	(England)	ST	17 September 2001 (aged 18)	West Brom (England) (Loan)	2020	2021
18	Bilel Mohsni	(Tunisia)	CB	21 July 1987 (aged 33)	Panachaiki (Greece)	2020	2021
20	Owura Edwards	(England)	RW	10 April 2001 (aged 19)	Bristol City (England) (Loan)	2020	2021
21	James Tilley	(England)	ST / AM	13 June 1998 (aged 22)	Brighton (England)	2020	2021
26	Terry Taylor	(Wales)	DM	29 June 2001 (aged 19)	Wolves (England) (loan)	2020	2021
28	Joey Hope	(England)	LB	28 August 2002 (aged 18)	Academy	2020	2021
36	James Morton	(England)	CM	22 April 1999 (aged 21)	Bristol City (England) (Loan)	2020	2021
38	Virgil Gomis	(France)	ST	16 April 1999 (aged 21)	Nottingham Forest (England) (Loan)	2020	2021

Players' ages are as of the opening day of the 2020–21 season (12 September).

== Competitions ==
=== EFL League Two ===
==== League table ====
Pos	Team	Pld	W	D	L	GF	GA	GD	Pts	Promotion, qualification or relegation
17	Harrogate Town	46	16	9	21	52	61	−9	57	
18	Oldham Athletic	46	15	9	22	72	81	−9	54	
19	Walsall	46	11	20	15	45	53	−8	53	
20	Colchester United	46	11	18	17	44	61	−17	51	
21	Barrow	46	13	11	22	53	59	−6	50	
22	Scunthorpe United	46	13	9	24	41	64	−23	48	
23	Southend United (R)	46	10	15	21	29	58	−29	45	Relegation to National League
24	Grimsby Town (R)	46	10	13	23	37	69	−32	43	Relegation to National League

Updated to match(es) played on 31 May 2021. Source: EFL Official Website
Rules for classification: 1) Points; 2) Goal difference; 3) Number of goals scored; 4) Head-to-head results; 5) Wins; 6) Away goals; 7) Penalty points (sec 9.5); 8) 12-point sending off offences
(R) Relegated

==== Results summary ====
Overall								Home						Away					
Pld	W	D	L	GF	GA	GD	Pts	W	D	L	GF	GA	GD	W	D	L	GF	GA	GD
46	10	13	23	37	69	−32	43	5	8	10	17	30	−13	5	5	13	20	39	−19

Last updated: 8 May 2021.
Source: BBC

==== Results by matchday ====
Matchday	1	2	3	4	5	6	7	8	9	10	11	12	13	14	15	16	17	18	19	20	21	22	23	24	25	26	27	28	29	30	31	32	33	34	35	36	37	38	39	40	41	42	43	44	45	46
Ground	A	H	A	A	A	H	H	A	A	H	A	A	H	A	H	H	A	H	H	A	H	H	A	H	A	H	A	H	A	H	H	A	H	H	A	A	H	A	H	A	H	H	A	A	H	A
Result	L	L	D	W	W	L	D	L	D	W	L	W	L	L	L	D	L	W	L	L	D	L	L	D	L	L	L	W	L	L	L	D	D	D	D	W	D	D	D	L	W	L	W	L	W	L
Position	20	23	23	18	15	16	17	19	17	18	20	18	18	20	20	20	20	19	20	22	22	23	23	23	23	23	23	23	24	24	24	24	24	24	24	24	24	24	24	24	24	24	24	24	24	24

Updated to match(es) played on 8 May 2021. Source: 11v11 for league tables and fixtures
A = Away; H = Home; W = Win; D = Draw; L = Loss

==== Matches ====
Win Draw Loss Postponed

The 2020–21 season fixtures were released on 21 August.

12 September 2020 1	Walsall	1–0	Grimsby Town	Bescot
15:00 BST	Cockerill-Mollett (yellow card) 44'; Adebayo 60'	Report	Edwards (yellow card) 44'; Idehen (yellow card) 69'	Stadium: Banks's Stadium; Attendance: 0 Referee: Lee Swabey

19 September 2020 2	Grimsby Town	0–4	Salford City	Cleethorpes
15:00 BST	Tilley (yellow card) 48'; Öhman (red card) 90+2'	Report	Hunter (yellow card) 28'; Henderson 32' (pen.), 63' (pen.), 76'; Towell (yellow card) 56' (goal) 90+3' (pen.); Touray (yellow card) 89'	Stadium: Blundell Park; Attendance: 0 Referee: Declan Bourne

10 October 2020 3	Bolton Wanderers	0–0	Grimsby Town	Horwich
15:00 BST	Sarcevic (yellow card) 70'; Santos (yellow card) 90+7'	Report	Green (yellow card) 52'	Stadium: University of Bolton Stadium; Attendance: 0 Referee: Sam Barrott

13 October 2020 4	Cheltenham Town	1–3	Grimsby Town	Cheltenham
19:00 BST	Williams 28'; Bonds (yellow card) 49'	Report	Edwards 23'; Tilley 39'; Pollock (yellow card) 67'; Hendrie (yellow card) 84'; Windsor 90+4'	Stadium: Whaddon Road; Attendance: 0 Referee: Paul Howard

17 October 2020 5	Leyton Orient	2–3	Grimsby Town	Leyton
17:30 BST	Wilkinson 5'; Wright (yellow card) 39'; Maguire-Drew 74' (yellow card) 75'; Clay (yellow card) 90'; McAnuff (yellow card) 90+3'	Report	Waterfall 22'; Williams 32'; Clifton (yellow card) 86'; Gibson 90+1' (pen.)	Stadium: Breyer Group Stadium; Attendance: 0 Referee: Tom Nield

20 October 2020 6	Grimsby Town	1–2	Harrogate Town	Cleethorpes
19:45 BST	Tilley 26' (yellow card) 61'; Pollock (yellow card) 45'; Hendrie (yellow card) 48'; Preston (yellow card) 56'; Clifton (yellow card) 70'	Report	Muldoon 25', 43'; Thomson (yellow card) 42'; Kerry (yellow card) 73'	Stadium: Blundell Park; Attendance: 0 Referee: Seb Stockbridge

24 October 2020 7	Grimsby Town	1–1	Carlisle United	Cleethorpes
15:00 BST	Pollock 24' (yellow card) 90+3'; Taylor (yellow card) 37'; Waterfall (yellow card) 76'; Starbuck (yellow card) 82'	Report	Anderton (yellow card) 18'; McKeown 46' (o.g.)	Stadium: Blundell Park; Attendance: 0 Referee: Christopher Pollard

27 October 2020 8	Forest Green Rovers	1–0	Grimsby Town	Nailsworth
19:00 GMT	Young 24'; Winchester (yellow card) 48'; Godwin-Malife (yellow card) 90+4'	Report	Taylor (yellow card) 90+2'; Green (yellow card) 90+3'	Stadium: The Innocent [Insert Name Here] Stadium; Attendance: 0 Referee: James Adcock

31 October 2020 9	Stevenage	0–0	Grimsby Town	Stevenage
15:00 GMT	Coker (yellow card) 84'	Report	Taylor (yellow card) 53'	Stadium: Lamex Stadium; Attendance: 0 Referee: Sam Allison

3 November 2020 10	Grimsby Town	1–0	Barrow	Grimsby
19:00 GMT	Gibson 60'; Waterfall (yellow card) 77'; McKeown (yellow card) 89'	Report	Hird (yellow card) 41'; Platt (yellow card) 71'	Stadium: Blundell Park; Attendance: 0 Referee: Alan Young

21 November 2020 11	Tranmere Rovers	5–0	Grimsby Town	Birkenhead
15:00 GMT	Vaughan 10', 29' (pen.); Clarke 27'; Khan 34'; Monthé (yellow card) 79'; Lewis 86'	Report	Hendrie (yellow card) 35'; Waterfall (yellow card) 65'	Stadium: Prenton Park; Attendance: 0 Referee: Marc Edwards

24 November 2020 12	Crawley Town	1–2	Grimsby Town	Crawley
19:00 GMT	Watters 4' (yellow card) 80'; Powell (yellow card) 78'	Report	Green 35'; Wright 51'; Hewitt (yellow card) 80'	Stadium: The People's Pension Stadium; Attendance: 0 Referee: Kevin Johnson

1 December 2020 13	Grimsby Town	1–4	Exeter City	Cleethorpes
19:00 GMT	Hendrie 31' (yellow card) 36'; Rose (yellow card) 50'	Report	Bowman 19'; Williams 40', 44'; Jay 68'; Key (yellow card) 74'	Stadium: Blundell Park; Attendance: 0 Referee: Andy Haines

5 December 2020 14	Colchester United	2–1	Grimsby Town	Colchester
15:00 GMT	Smith 8'; Harriott 56'; Gambin (yellow card) 63'; Eastman (yellow card) 87'	Report	Pollock (yellow card) 2'; Hendrie 23'	Stadium: JobServe Community Stadium; Attendance: 0 Referee: Lee Swabey

8 December 2020 15	Grimsby Town	0–2	Newport County	Cleethorpes
19:00 GMT	Hendrie (yellow card) 24'; Taylor (yellow card) 52'; Waterfall (yellow card) 66'	Report	Twine 25'; Amond 45+1' (pen.); Willmott (yellow card) 50'	Stadium: Blundell Park; Attendance: 0 Referee: Anthony Backhouse

12 December 2020 16	Grimsby Town	1–1	Mansfield Town	Cleethorpes
15:00 GMT	Bennett (yellow card) 48'; Jackson Jr 63'; Russell (yellow card) 68'; Clifton (yellow card) 72'; Morais (yellow card) 87'	Report	Gordon (yellow card) 54'; Maynard 69' (pen.); Lapslie (yellow card) 89'	Stadium: Blundell Park; Attendance: 0 Referee: Carl Brook

15 December 2020 17	Southend United	3–1	Grimsby Town	Southend-on-Sea
19:45 GMT	Taylor 1'; Clifford 57'; Halford 75'; Egbri (yellow card) 89'	Report	Jackson Jr 45+4'; Hewitt (yellow card) 68'; Waterfall (yellow card) 73' (yellow-red card) 90+4'	Stadium: Roots Hall; Attendance: 0 Referee: Sam Allison

19 December 2020 18	Grimsby Town	1–0	Scunthorpe United	Cleethorpes
15:00 GMT	Pollock 21'; Spokes (yellow card) 59'; Holloway (yellow card)	Report	McAtee (yellow card) 39'; Jarvis (yellow card) 55'; Clarke (yellow card) 69'	Stadium: Blundell Park; Attendance: 0 Referee: Darren Drysdale

22 December 2020 19	Grimsby Town	1–2	Bradford City	Cleethorpes
19:00 GMT	Clifton 49'	Report	Novak 21'; Sutton 45'	Stadium: Blundell Park; Attendance: 0 Referee: John Busby

26 December 2020 20	Morecambe	3–1	Grimsby Town	Morecambe
15:00 GMT	Stockton (yellow card) 45'; Songo'o (yellow card) 56'; Mendes Gomes 58', 71'; Phillips 90+3'	Report	Pollock 21'	Stadium: Mazuma Stadium; Attendance: 0 Referee: Declan Bourne

29 December 2020 21	Grimsby Town	0–0	Oldham Athletic	Cleethorpes
19:00 GMT	Pollock (yellow card) 39'; Hewitt (yellow card) 86'; Preston (yellow card) 88'	Report	Piergianni (yellow card) 33'; Garrity (yellow card) 68'; Ntambwe (yellow card) 86'	Stadium: Blundell Park; Attendance: 0 Referee: Tom Nield

2 January 2021 22	Grimsby Town	1–2	Cambridge United	Cleethorpes
15:00 GMT	Hewitt 72'	Report	May 4'; Mullin 36'; Hannant (yellow card) 90+1'	Stadium: Blundell Park; Attendance: 0 Referee: Andy Haines

9 January 2021 23	Port Vale	3–0	Grimsby Town	Burslem
15:00 GMT	Brisley 8', (yellow card) 69'; Joyce (yellow card) 11'; Rodney 15'; Waterfall 60' (o.g.)	Report	Wright (yellow card) 86'	Stadium: Vale Park; Attendance: 0 Referee: Graham Salisbury

16 January 2021 24	Grimsby Town	0–0	Southend United	Cleethorpes
15:00 GMT	Habergham (yellow card) 71'; Spokes (yellow card) 90+1'	Report	McCormack (yellow card) 74'; White (yellow card) 75'; Demetriou (yellow card) 90+4'	Stadium: Blundell Park; Attendance: 0 Referee: Ben Toner

23 January 2021 25	Scunthorpe United	3–0	Grimsby Town	Scunthorpe
13:00 GMT	Eisa 14', 65'; Loft 38', (yellow card) 75'; Gilliead (yellow card) 83'	Report	Wright (yellow card) 29'	Stadium: Sands Venue Stadium; Attendance: 0 Referee: Ollie Yates

30 January 2021 26	Grimsby Town	1–2	Stevenage	Cleethorpes
15:00 GMT	McKeown (yellow card) 73'; Payne 90+3'	Report	List 42'; Vincelot (yellow card) 70'; Stevens 90+5'	Stadium: Blundell Park; Attendance: 0 Referee: Anthony Backhouse

6 February 2021 27	Newport County	1–0	Grimsby Town	Newport
15:00 GMT	Bennett (red card) 37'; Maynard 51'	Report	Matete (yellow card) 81'	Stadium: Rodney Parade; Attendance: 0 Referee: Craig Hicks

23 February 2021 28	Grimsby Town	2–1	Crawley Town	Cleethorpes
19:00 GMT	Morais 21'; Bunney (yellow card) 69' (yellow-red card) 90+3'; Adams (yellow card) 70', (goal) 79'; Hewitt (yellow card) 85'	Report	Powell 30'; Wright (yellow card) 32'; Hessenthaler (yellow card) 90'	Stadium: Blundell Park; Attendance: 0 Referee: Bobby Madley

27 February 2021 29	Harrogate Town	1–0	Grimsby Town	Harrogate
15:00 GMT	Beck 77'	Report	Matete (yellow card) 16'	Stadium: The EnviroVent Stadium; Attendance: 0 Referee: Trevor Kettle

2 March 2021 30	Grimsby Town	0–1	Leyton Orient	Cleethorpes
19:00 GMT		Report	Happe 20'	Stadium: Blundell Park; Attendance: 0 Referee: Steve Martin

6 March 2021 31	Grimsby Town	1–2	Forest Green Rovers	Cleethorpes
15:00 GMT	Matete (yellow card) 30'; Hanson 38'	Report	Matt 19' (pen.); Adams 66' Mark Cooper (yellow card)	Stadium: Blundell Park; Attendance: 0 Referee: Peter Wright

9 March 2021 32	Carlisle United	1–1	Grimsby Town	Carlisle
19:00 GMT	Hayden (yellow card) 31'; Zanzala 90+3'	Report	John-Lewis 16'; Coke (yellow card) 55'	Stadium: Brunton Park; Attendance: 0 Referee: Chris Sarginson

13 March 2021 33	Grimsby Town	0–0	Colchester United	Cleethorpes
17:30 GMT	Matete (yellow card) 25'	Report	Pell (yellow card) 90+2'	Stadium: Blundell Park; Attendance: 0 Referee: Marc Edwards

17 March 2021 34	Grimsby Town	0–0	Tranmere Rovers	Cleethorpes
19:00 GMT	Lamy (yellow card) 8'; Clifton (yellow card) 60'	Report	Blackett-Taylor (yellow card) 47'; Ridehalgh (yellow card) 71'	Stadium: Blundell Park; Attendance: 0 Referee: Robert Lewis

20 March 2021 35	Mansfield Town	2–2	Grimsby Town	Mansfield
15:00 GMT	Maris 20'; Law 67'; McLaughlin (yellow card) 70'; Sweeney (yellow card) 90'; Wright (yellow card) 90+6'	Report	Jackson Jr (yellow card) 56'; John-Lewis 63'; Matete (yellow card) 63'; Williams 90+1'	Stadium: One Call Stadium; Attendance: 0 Referee: John Busby

23 March 2021 36	Barrow	0–1	Grimsby Town	Barrow-in-Furness
19:00 GMT		Report	John-Lewis (yellow card) 62'; Spokes 71'	Stadium: Furness Building Society Stadium; Attendance: 0 Referee: Ben Speedie

27 March 2021 37	Grimsby Town	1–1	Walsall	Cleethorpes
15:00 GMT	Hanson 9'; Payne (yellow card) 12'	Report	Lavery 45+1'; Clarke (yellow card) 88'	Stadium: Blundell Park; Attendance: 0 Referee: Sam Barrott

2 April 2021 38	Salford City	1–1	Grimsby Town	Salford
15:00 BST	Lowe (yellow card) 26'; Touray (yellow card) 73', (goal) 88'	Report	Clifton 2', (yellow card) 19'; Payne (yellow card) 50'; Matete (yellow card) 73'	Stadium: Moor Lane; Attendance: 0 Referee: Declan Bourne

5 April 2021 39	Grimsby Town	1–1	Cheltenham Town	Cleethorpes
15:00 BST	John-Lewis 8'	Report	Boyle 34'	Stadium: Blundell Park; Attendance: 0 Referee: Andy Davies

10 April 2021 40	Bradford City	1–0	Grimsby Town	Bradford
15:00 BST	A. O'Connor 42'; P. O'Connor (yellow card) 70'; Donaldson (yellow card) 76'	Report	Habergham (yellow card) 38'; Williams (yellow card) 44'; Payne (red card) 45+2'; Hanson (yellow card) 90+3'	Stadium: Utilita Energy Stadium; Attendance: 0 Referee: James Bell

17 April 2021 41	Grimsby Town	2–1	Bolton Wanderers	Cleethorpes
12:30 BST	Matete 1', (yellow card) 78'; Khouri (yellow card) 34'; Clifton (yellow card) 59'; Jackson Jr 86'	Report	Williams (yellow card) 6'; Miller 90+6'	Stadium: Blundell Park; Attendance: 0 Referee: Carl Brook

20 April 2021 42	Grimsby Town	0–3	Morecambe	Cleethorpes
19:00 BST	Clifton (yellow card) 83'	Report	Stockton 22'; Songo'o 28'; Waterfall 81' (o.g.)	Stadium: Blundell Park; Attendance: 0 Referee: Paul Howard

24 April 2021 43	Oldham Athletic	1–2	Grimsby Town	Oldham
15:00 BST	McAleny 30'; Whelan (yellow card) 39'	Report	Coke (yellow card) 6'; Green 36'; Menayese (yellow card) 73'; Matete 80'; Khouri (yellow card) 89'	Stadium: Boundary Park; Attendance: 0 Referee: Alan Young

27 April 2021 44	Exeter City	3–2	Grimsby Town	Exeter
19:00 BST	Waterfall 33' (o.g.); Collins (yellow card) 79'; Fisher 83'; Bowman 89'	Report	John-Lewis 41' (pen.); Matete 58', (red card) 61'; Menayese (yellow card) 90+7'	Stadium: St James Park; Attendance: 0 Referee: David Rock

1 May 2021 45	Grimsby Town	1–0	Port Vale	Cleethorpes
15:00 BST	Green 32', (yellow card) 45'	Report	Legge (yellow card) 54'; Montaño (yellow card) 83' (yellow-red card) 87'	Stadium: Blundell Park; Attendance: 0 Referee: Will Finnie

8 May 2021 46	Cambridge United	3–0	Grimsby Town	Cambridge
15:00 BST	O'Neil 25'; Hoolahan 57'; Mullin 80'	Report		Stadium: Abbey Stadium; Attendance: 0 Referee: Tom Nield

=== FA Cup ===
The draw for the first round was made on Monday 26, October.

Win Draw Loss

7 November 2020 First round	Dagenham & Redbridge	3–1	Grimsby Town	Dagenham
15:00 GMT	Wilson 10', 90+1'; Ogogo (yellow card) 82'; Brundle 90+6' (pen.)	Report	Windsor 60' (pen.)	Stadium: Victoria Road; Attendance: 0 Referee: Craig Hicks

=== EFL Cup ===
Win Draw Loss

The first round draw was made on 18 August, live on Sky Sports, by Paul Merson.

5 September 2020 First round	Grimsby Town	1–1 (3–4 p)	Morecambe	Cleethorpes
15:00 BST	Green 34'	Report	Phillips 7'; Slew (yellow card) 44'	Stadium: Blundell Park; Attendance: 0 Referee: Graham Salisbury
	Penalties
	Pollock (penalty scored); Tilley (penalty missed); Preston (penalty scored); Edwards (penalty scored); McKeown (penalty missed)		Kenyon (penalty missed); McAlinden (penalty scored); Hendrie (penalty scored); Pringle (penalty scored); O'Sullivan (penalty scored)

=== EFL Trophy ===
Win Draw Loss

The regional group stage draw was confirmed on 18 August.

Pos	Div	Team	Pld	W	PW	PL	L	GF	GA	GD	Pts	Qualification
1	L1	Hull City	3	2	0	0	1	6	2	+4	6	Advance to Round 2
2	ACA	Leicester City U21	3	2	0	0	1	6	5	+1	6	Advance to Round 2
3	L2	Harrogate Town	3	1	0	1	1	5	5	0	4	
4	L2	Grimsby Town	3	0	1	0	2	3	8	−5	2	

Source: EFL.com

8 September 2020 Group stage	Grimsby Town	2–2 (5–4 p)	Harrogate Town	Cleethorpes
19:45 BST	Gibson 36' (pen.); Öhman (yellow card) 74'; Boyd 74'; Taylor (yellow card) 80'; Khouri (red card) 90'	Report	Lokko (yellow card) 33' (goal) 86'; Smith (yellow card) 65'; Burrell (penalty missed) 81; Kiernan 81'	Stadium: Blundell Park; Attendance: 0 Referee: James Bell
	Penalties
	Gibson (penalty scored); Taylor (penalty scored); Edwards (penalty scored); Starbuck (penalty scored); Jackson Jr (penalty scored)		Thomson (penalty scored); Martin (penalty scored); Beck (penalty scored); Burrell (penalty scored); Kerry (penalty missed)

10 November 2020 Group stage	Grimsby Town	1–3	Leicester City U21	Cleethorpes
19:00 GMT	Pollock 21'; Spokes (yellow card) 89'	Report	Wright 58'; Tavares 60'; Muskwe 74'; Flynn (yellow card) 85'	Stadium: Blundell Park; Attendance: 0 Referee: Neil Hair

17 November 2020 Group stage	Hull City	3–0	Grimsby Town	Kingston upon Hull
17:30 GMT	Samuelsen 27', 32'; Scott 79'	Report	Wright (yellow card) 3'; Edwards (yellow card) 64'	Stadium: KCOM Stadium; Attendance: 0 Referee: Darren Drysdale
