= Daniel Preston =

Daniel Preston is the name of:

- Dan Preston (born 1991), English footballer
- Danny Preston (born 2000), English footballer
