= Luke Spokes =

English footballer

Personal information
- Full name: Luke Spokes
- Date of birth: 6 August 2000 (age 26)
- Place of birth: Bristol, England
- Position: Midfielder

Team information
- Current team: Hereford
- Number: 14

Youth career
- SGS College

Senior career*
Years	Team	Apps	(Gls)
2018–2019	Mangotsfield United	26	(3)
2019–2020	Yate Town	18	(5)
2020	Taunton Town	7	(0)
2020–2022	Grimsby Town	17	(1)
2021	→ Boston United (loan)	3	(0)
2021–2022	→ Spennymoor Town (loan)	26	(1)
2022–2023	Bath City	41	(0)
2023–2025	Chippenham Town	89	(9)
2025–2026	Kidderminster Harriers	19	(2)
2026	→ Weston-super-Mare (loan)	4	(0)
2026	Weston-super-Mare	18	(2)
2026–	Hereford	17	(1)
- * Club domestic league appearances and goals as of 20:16, 21 November 2026 (UTC)

Luke Spokes (born 6 August 2000) is an English footballer who plays as a midfielder for National League North club Hereford.

Spokes began his career in Non-League football and played for Mangotsfield United, Yate Town and Taunton Town before signing a professional contract with Grimsby Town in the summer of 2020 whilst they were members of the EFL. He has also played for Boston United and Spennymoor Town on loan before joining Bath City permanently in 2022.

== Early life ==
He is originally from Westbury-on-Trym, Bristol. He studied at Redland Green school for years (7-11)

== Career ==
=== Early career ===
Spokes signed for Mangotsfield United in September 2018 after playing at South Gloucestershire and Stroud College under Dave Hockaday. After a trial at Burnley and interest from other professional clubs, he moved up one division to sign for Yate Town, before moving on to Taunton Town in January 2020.

=== Grimsby Town ===
In September 2020 Spokes moved into professional football after signing a one-year contract with Ian Holloway's Grimsby Town. He scored his first professional goal when he scored the only goal of the game with a 20 yard strike with his left foot away at relegation rivals Barrow on 23 March 2021.

On 25 September 2021 having yet to have make an appearance during the 2021–22 season, Spokes joined Boston United on a one-month loan. Spokes made his debut later that day and came off the bench in a 2-1 victory over Guiseley. Spokes made a total of six appearances during his month on loan with Boston, three of which came in the League.

On 18 November 2021, Spokes signed for National League North side Spennymoor Town on a three-month loan. Spokes scored goals in a 4-2 win against Chester and a 3-1 victory in the FA Trophy over Plymouth Parkway. In February 2022, the loan deal was extended until the end of the season. He was praised by Spennymoor co-manager Anthony Johnson for his work ethic.

Grimsby secured promotion with victory in the play-off final, though Spokes was not in the matchday squad at London Stadium.

On 11 June 2022, the club announced their retained list ahead of the 2022–23 season and confirmed that Spokes would be among those released when his contract expires on 30 June.

=== Bath City ===
On 5 July 2022, Spokes signed for Bath City.

Spokes was released by Bath at the end of the 2022–23 season.

=== Chippenham Town ===
On 28 June 2023, Spokes signed for Chippenham Town on a one-year contract.

=== Kidderminster Harriers ===
On 4 June 2025, Spokes joined National League North club Kidderminster Harriers.

=== Weston-super-Mare ===
On 3 January 2026, Spokes joined National League South club Weston-super-Mare on loan until the end of the season, before joining them permanently. He was released by the club at the end of the season.

=== Hereford ===
On 2 June 2026, Spokes joined National League North club Hereford.

== Career statistics ==
As of match played 21 November 2026

Appearances and goals by club, season and competition
Club	Season	League			FA Cup		EFL Cup		Other		Total	
Club	Season	Division	Apps	Goals	Apps	Goals	Apps	Goals	Apps	Goals	Apps	Goals
Mangotsfield United	2018–19	SL Division One South	26	3	0	0	—		4 (Note: Three appearances and two goals in FA Trophy, one appearance in Gloucestershire Senior Cup)	2	30	5
Yate Town	2019–20	SL Premier Division South	18	5	1	0	—		7 (Note: Five appearances in FA Trophy, one appearance in Southern League Cup, one appearance and one goal in Gloucestershire Senior Cup)	1	26	6
Taunton Town	2019–20	SL Premier Division South	7	0	0	0	—		2 (Note: Appearances in Somerset Premier Cup)	0	9	0
Grimsby Town	2020–21	League Two	17	1	0	0	0	0	3 (Note: Appearances in the EFL Trophy)	0	20	1
Grimsby Town	2021–22	National League	0	0	0	0	—		0	0	0	0
Grimsby Town	Total		17	1	0	0	0	0	3	0	20	1
Boston United (loan)	2021–22	National League North	3	0	3	0	—		0	0	6	0
Spennymoor Town (loan)	2021–22	National League North	26	1	—		—		3 (Note: Two appearances and one goal in FA Trophy, one appearance and one goal in Durham Challenge Cup)	2	29	3
Bath City	2022–23	National League South	41	0	3	0	—		7 (Note: Three appearances and one goal in FA Trophy, four appearances and one goal in Somerset Premier Cup)	2	51	2
Chippenham Town	2023–24	National League South	44	3	1	0	—		3 (Note: Appearance(s) in FA Trophy)	0	48	3
Chippenham Town	2024–25	National League South	45	6	3	0	—		1	0	49	6
Chippenham Town	Total		89	9	4	0	—		4	0	97	9
Kidderminster Harriers	2025–26	National League North	19	2	1	0	—		2	1	22	3
Weston-super-Mare (loan)	2025–26	National League South	4	0	1	0	—		—		5	0
Weston-super-Mare	2025–26	National League South	18	2	—		—		2 (Note: Appearances in National League South play-offs)	0	20	2
Hereford	2026–27	National League North	17	1	1	0	—		0	0	18	1
Career total			285	24	14	0	0	0	34	8	333	32
