= Joey Hope =

English footballer (born 2002)

Personal information
- Full name: Joseph Alexander Hope
- Date of birth: 28 June 2002 (age 24)
- Position: Defender

Team information
- Current team: West Auckland Town

Youth career
- 2016–2018: Sunderland
- 2018–2020: Grimsby Town

Senior career*
Years	Team	Apps	(Gls)
2019–2021	Grimsby Town	0	(0)
2020	→ Cleethorpes Town (loan)	3	(0)
2021–2022	Darlington	1	(0)
2021	→ Guisborough Town (loan)	1	(0)
2022	→ Northallerton Town (loan)	11	(1)
2022–2023	Marske United	12	(0)
2022–2023	→ Northallerton Town (loan)		
2023–	West Auckland Town		
- * Club domestic league appearances and goals

Joseph Alexander Hope (born 28 June 2002) is an English footballer who plays as a left back for Northern Premier League Division One East club West Auckland Town.

He previously played for Grimsby Town, for which he made his senior debut in 2020, and spent time on loan at Northern Premier League club Cleethorpes Town, before joining Darlington of the National League North. He spent time on loan at Guisborough Town and Northallerton Town before signing for Marske United in 2022. After a further spell on loan at Northallerton, he signed for West Auckland Town at the start of the 2023–24 season.

== Early life ==
Hope attended Richmond School in Richmond, North Yorkshire. He played youth football in the Teesside area for teams including Richmond Town U11 and Polton Allstars, and represented North Yorkshire Schools at U16 level. He was for a time a member of Sunderland's academy, from where he joined Grimsby Town in 2018.

== Career ==
=== Grimsby Town ===
Hope's performances for the club's under-18 team and reserves earned him a scholarship to begin in July 2018, but his first year was disrupted by injury. He missed pre-season while recovering from knee surgery, and when he returned to action he suffered a similar injury to the other knee. He was given a first-team squad number for 2019–20 and named among the substitutes for EFL Cup and EFL Trophy matches early in the season, but remained unused. In October 2019, he was reported to be interesting clubs including Everton and Middlesbrough, but nothing came of the rumours. He signed a one-year professional contract, and made his senior debut on 8 September 2020, starting in a EFL Trophy match against Harrogate Town. According to the Grimsby Telegraph, "he really shone. Looked to be Town's biggest threat going forward in the first half, carrying the ball with ease and coming up with a decent final product." He played 67 minutes before making way for Grimsby Town's youngest debutant, the 15-year-old Louis Boyd; the team went on to win on penalties. In October, he made three appearances in the Northern Premier League South East Division during a one-month loan spell with Cleethorpes Town. On 30 March 2021, the club confirmed that Hope had been released from his contract by mutual consent.

=== Darlington ===
Hope signed for National League North club Darlington in May 2021, and was one of six debutants in the starting eleven for their first match of the season, a 3–2 defeat at home to Alfreton Town. In September, he joined Northern League Division One club Guisborough Town on loan for a month and went straight into the starting eleven for the 3–1 win away to Crook Town. On 5 January 2022, Hope joined Northern League Division One club Northallerton Town on loan for the remainder of the 2021–22 season, where he made 13 appearances and scored his first career goal.

=== Marske United ===
Hope joined Northern Premier League Premier Division club Marske United in July 2022. He made nine appearances for Marske before returning to Northallerton Town on a short-term loan in October 2022.

== Career statistics ==
As of end of 2022–23 season

Appearances and goals by club, season and competition
Club	Season	League			FA Cup		EFL Cup		Other		Total	
Club	Season	Division	Apps	Goals	Apps	Goals	Apps	Goals	Apps	Goals	Apps	Goals
Grimsby Town	2019–20	League Two	0	0	0	0	0	0	0	0	0	0
Grimsby Town	2020–21	League Two	0	0	0	0	0	0	1 (Note: Appearance in EFL Trophy)	0	1	0
Grimsby Town	Total		0	0	0	0	0	0	1	0	1	0
Cleethorpes Town (loan)	2020–21	Northern Premier League; Division One South East	3	0	—		—		—		3	0
Darlington	2021–22	National League North	1	0	0	0	—		0	0	1	0
Guisborough Town (loan)	2021–22	Northern League Division One	1	0	—		—		0	0	1	0
Northallerton Town (loan)	2021–22	Northern League Division One			—		—				13	1
Marske United	2022–23	NPL Premier Division	12	0	1	0	—		4 (Note: Three appearances in FA Trophy, one in North Riding Senior Cup)	0	17	0
Northallerton Town (loan)	2022–23	Northern League Division One			—		—				11	1
West Auckland Town	2023–24	Northern League Division One					—					
Career total			17	0	1	0	0	0	5	0	47	2
