= Stefan Payne =

English footballer (born 1991)

Personal information
- Full name: Stefan Steve Payne
- Date of birth: 10 August 1991 (age 35)
- Place of birth: Lambeth, England
- Height: 6 ft 2 in (1.88 m)
- Position: Forward

Team information
- Current team: AFC Greenwich Borough

Youth career
- –2009: Croydon

Senior career*
Years	Team	Apps	(Gls)
2009	Croydon		
2009	Sutton United	10	(6)
2009–2010	Fulham	0	(0)
2010–2012	Gillingham	28	(1)
2011	→ Braintree Town (loan)	5	(0)
2012	Aldershot Town	1	(0)
2012	Sutton United	18	(4)
2012–2013	Macclesfield Town	1	(0)
2013	Ebbsfleet United	13	(2)
2013–2014	AFC Hornchurch	46	(35)
2014–2016	Dover Athletic	84	(33)
2016–2017	Barnsley	9	(0)
2017	→ Shrewsbury Town (loan)	12	(2)
2017–2018	Shrewsbury Town	39	(11)
2018–2019	Bristol Rovers	20	(2)
2019	→ Shrewsbury Town (loan)	5	(0)
2019–2021	Tranmere Rovers	19	(4)
2021	Grimsby Town	13	(1)
2021–2022	Chesterfield	16	(0)
2022	→ Havant & Waterlooville (loan)	16	(5)
2022–2023	Welling United	33	(10)
2023	Tonbridge Angels	5	(1)
2023–2024	Faversham Town	41	(36)
2024–2025	Lydd Town	10	(3)
2025	Punjab United	6	(0)
2025–	AFC Greenwich Borough	24	(23)

International career
2015	England C	1	(0)
- * Club domestic league appearances and goals as of 10:31, 27 April 2026 (UTC)

Stefan Steve Payne (born 10 August 1991) is an English footballer who plays as a forward for Southern Counties East League Premier Division club AFC Greenwich Borough.

He began his career in non-League football with Croydon and Sutton United before joining Fulham, and made his professional debut for Gillingham in League Two in 2010. He did not maintain a first-team place at Gillingham and dropped back into non-league between 2012 and 2016, moving clubs frequently. After two prolific seasons in the Conference Premier for Dover Athletic he signed for Championship club Barnsley, where he did not feature frequently.

Payne then played for Shrewsbury Town in League One, initially on loan, and was their top scorer in the 2017–18 season as they reached the finals of the EFL Trophy and League One play-offs. He subsequently signed for Bristol Rovers, and after a brief loan back at Shrewsbury, Tranmere Rovers.

== Career ==
=== Early career ===
Payne played for the Croydon youth team during the 2008–09 season and broke into the first team towards the tail end of the campaign and impressed Sutton United officials during a Southern Youth League cup final against them. In the summer of 2009, Payne signed a contract with Sutton for the 2009–10 season. He made an immediate impact, scoring a hat-trick in the club's first league game of the season, a 4–0 win over Margate.

He quickly attracted attention from Football League scouts. In September 2009, Premier League club Fulham offered Payne and Sutton a contract. It was thought to be worth a six-figure-sum for Sutton. Although Fulham could not officially sign a player outside the transfer window, Payne joined the reserve squad in October. He played many games for the reserve team but did not break into the first team.

=== Gillingham ===
During the 2010 close-season, Gillingham manager Andy Hessenthaler revealed his eagerness to sign Payne, and the striker joined Gillingham on a free transfer in June 2010, signing a two-year contract. He made his professional debut in the first league game of the League Two season on 7 August, starting in a 1–1 home draw with Cheltenham Town. In February 2011, Payne went to Braintree Town of the Conference North on a one-month loan, and scored a hat-trick in his second appearance to help beat Basingstoke Town 5–2.

Payne scored his first goal for Gillingham to conclude the 6–1 away win over Hereford United on 17 September 2011, nine minutes after coming on as a substitute for Frank Nouble. His only other goal for the Gills was on 22 November in an FA Cup first round replay at home to AFC Bournemouth, when he came on at half time for Chris Whelpdale and scored the 3–2 winner. He totalled 37 appearances for the Kent-based club, but only three as a starter.

=== Aldershot Town and return to non-league ===
On 27 January 2012, Payne signed for Aldershot Town of League Two for the rest of the season, having rescinded his Gillingham contract by mutual consent. He made his only appearance the following day in a 2–1 win at AFC Wimbledon, replacing Adam Mekki for the final ten minutes.

However, days later Aldershot stated on their website that Payne had been sent out on loan to Sutton United in the Conference South until the end of the season, as manager Dean Holdsworth said that he needed to play regular football. The Sutton Guardian announced that Payne's contract at Aldershot had been cancelled and that Sutton had got the player for nothing.

In January 2013, Payne stepped up to the Conference Premier by signing for Macclesfield Town. Again, he was limited to one ten-minute appearance for the Silkmen, in a 2–1 loss at Dartford on 15 January replacing Amari Morgan-Smith. Before the end of the month, he switched to struggling Ebbsfleet United of the same division for the rest of the campaign. He scored twice in 13 matches for the eventually relegated Fleet, and received two straight-red cards including one in the first half of a 2–0 loss at Luton Town on 18 April.

Payne signed in August 2013 for AFC Hornchurch in the Isthmian League, scoring twice on his debut away at Dulwich Hamlet. He totalled 31 goals in 46 games for the Urchins.

On 3 June 2014, Payne signed for newly promoted Dover Athletic of the Conference on a free transfer. He was the club's top scorer in both of his seasons with the Kent club, and was named Players' Player of the Year for the 2015–16 season.

=== Return to Football League ===
On 18 May 2016, Payne signed for Barnsley on a two-year contract with the option to extend for another year, on a free transfer. He made his Championship debut on 6 August in a 4–2 opening day loss at Ipswich Town, playing the final 17 minutes in place of Tom Bradshaw. He totalled 12 goalless appearances for Barnsley across all competitions, all as a substitute.

He signed on loan for Shrewsbury Town in League One for the remainder of the season on 30 January 2017 and debuted five days later by starting in a 2–1 home win over Bury. On 8 April he scored his first goal, the only one against Rochdale at the New Meadow to pull the Shrews out of the relegation zone. Six days later he struck again to ensure a 1–1 draw at local rivals Walsall.

After Shrewsbury secured their place in the third tier, Payne signed a two-year contract for an undisclosed fee in August 2017. He was the club's top scorer with 54 total games and 14 goals in a season in which they lost two finals at Wembley Stadium – the 2018 EFL Trophy Final to Lincoln City and the 2018 EFL League One play-off final to Rotherham United.

On 9 August 2018, after starting in Shrewsbury's first match of the new season, Payne signed an undisclosed contract for Bristol Rovers of the same division. He made his debut two days later, starting up front alongside fellow former Shrew Alex Rodman and scored a late equaliser in a 2–1 home loss to Accrington Stanley. In October, he was fined for making offensive gestures towards the club's own fans after they lost at Barnsley.

Payne returned to Shrewsbury on 31 January 2019, signing on loan for the remainder of the season. He made five appearances, all but one as a substitute, and did not score.

After cancelling his Bristol Rovers contract by mutual consent, Payne signed a two-year deal at Tranmere Rovers on 28 June 2019, who had just been promoted to League One. Payne captained Tranmere in the EFL Trophy third round tie against Leicester City under-21, where he scored, but eventually lost the match 2–1.

On 25 January 2021, Payne joined Grimsby Town on a deal until the end of the season, under former Shrewsbury manager Paul Hurst. Five days later on his debut at home to Stevenage, he came on as a 64th-minute substitute for Ira Jackson Jr and scored an added-time equaliser, though the team still lost 2–1. On 10 April, in a 1–0 loss at Bradford City, he was sent off for headbutting teammate Filipe Morais. Grimsby then removed both players from the first team squad. On 12 May 2021 it was announced that he would leave Grimsby at the end of the season, following the expiry of his contract.

=== Return to non-League football ===
On 2 July 2021, Payne agreed to return to the National League to sign for Chesterfield. On 4 February 2022, Payne joined National League South side Havant & Waterlooville on loan until the end of the 2021–22 season. Payne was released at the end of the 2021–22 season.

On 4 July 2022, Payne signed for Welling United.

On 6 July 2023, Payne joined fellow National League South club Tonbridge Angels. He departed the club however after just five matches on 31 August, joining Southern Counties East Premier Division club Faversham Town the following day. During his first season at the club, he won the league's Golden Boot award having scored thirty-four goals in just thirty-six matches as his side were defeated in the play-offs. He departed the club in October 2024 due to a lack of game time.

On 19 October 2024, following his departure from Faversham Town, Payne joined fellow Southern Counties East Premier Division side Lydd Town. In March 2025, Payne joined Punjab United.

Ahead of the 2025–26 season, Payne joined newly formed Southern Counties East Division One club AFC Greenwich Borough, scoring the club's first ever league goal. The season ended in success as the club secured the title on the final day of the season.

== Career statistics ==
As of end of 2025–26 season

Appearances and goals by club, season and competition
Club	Season	League			FA Cup		League Cup		Other		Total	
Club	Season	Division	Apps	Goals	Apps	Goals	Apps	Goals	Apps	Goals	Apps	Goals
Gillingham	2010–11	League Two	16	0	1	0	1	0	1 (Note: Appearances in Football League Trophy)	0	19	0
Gillingham	2011–12	League Two	12	1	4	1	1	0	1	0	18	2
Gillingham	Total		28	1	5	1	2	0	2	0	37	2
Braintree Town (loan)	2010–11	Conference North	5	0	0	0	~	~	0	0	5	0
Aldershot Town	2011–12	League Two	1	0	0	0	0	0	0	0	1	0
Sutton United	2011–12	Conference South	7	2	0	0	~	~	0	0	7	2
Sutton United	2012–13	Conference South	11	2	0	0	~	~	2 (Note: Appearances in FA Trophy)	0	13	2
Sutton United	Total		18	4	0	0	~	~	2	0	20	4
Macclesfield Town	2012–13	Conference Premier	1	0	0	0	~	~	0	0	1	0
Ebbsfleet United	2012–13	Conference Premier	13	2	0	0	~	~	0	0	13	2
AFC Hornchurch	2013–14	Isthmian Premier League	46	35	1	0	~	~	0	0	47	35
Dover Athletic	2014–15	Conference Premier	42	15	3	1	~	~	5	2	45	18
Dover Athletic	2015–16	National League	42	18	1	0	~	~	5 (Note: Three appearances in FA Trophy and two in National League play-offs)	4	48	22
Dover Athletic	Total		84	33	4	1	~	~	10	6	98	40
Barnsley	2016–17	Championship	7	0	1	0	1	0	0	0	9	0
Barnsley	2017–18	Championship	2	0	0	0	1	0	0	0	3	0
Barnsley	Total		9	0	1	0	2	0	0	0	12	0
Shrewsbury Town (loan)	2016–17	League One	12	2	0	0	0	0	0	0	12	2
Shrewsbury Town	2017–18	League One	38	11	4	1	0	0	9 (Note: Six appearances in EFL Trophy and three appearances in EFL League One play-offs)	2	51	14
Shrewsbury Town	2018–19	League One	1	0	0	0	0	0	0	0	1	0
Shrewsbury Town	Total		39	11	4	1	0	0	9	2	52	14
Bristol Rovers	2018–19	League One	20	2	2	0	2	0	3	1	27	3
Shrewsbury Town (loan)	2018–19	League One	5	0	0	0	0	0	0	0	5	0
Tranmere Rovers	2019–20	League One	15	4	3	0	0	0	3	0	21	4
Tranmere Rovers	2020–21	League Two	4	0	0	0	1	0	2	1	7	1
Tranmere Rovers	Total		19	4	3	0	1	0	5	1	28	5
Grimsby Town	2020–21	League Two	13	1	0	0	0	0	0	0	13	1
Chesterfield	2021–22	National League	16	0	3	1	—		0	0	19	1
Havant & Waterlooville (loan)	2021–22	National League South	16	5	0	0	—		0	0	16	5
Welling United	2022–23	National League South	33	10	0	0	—		2	1	35	11
Tonbridge Angels	2023–24	National League South	5	1	0	0	—		0	0	5	1
Faversham Town	2023–24	SCEFL Premier Division	35	34	1	0	—		3 (Note: Two appearances and one goal in SCEFL Challenge Cup, one appearance in SCEFL Premier Division play-offs)	1	39	35
Faversham Town	2024–25	SCEFL Premier Division	6	2	1	0	—		2 (Note: Appearance(s) in FA Vase)	0	9	2
Faversham Town	Total		41	36	2	0	0	0	5	1	48	37
Lydd Town	2024–25	SCEFL Premier Division	10	3	—		—		0	0	10	3
Punjab United	2024–25	SCEFL Premier Division	6	0	—		—		0	0	6	0
AFC Greenwich Borough	2025–26	SCEFL First Division	24	23	0	0	—		3 (Note: LST)	1	27	24
Career total			443	171	23	4	5	0	36	11	509	187

== Honours ==
Shrewsbury Town

- EFL Trophy runner-up: 2017–18

AFC Greenwich Borough

- SCEFL Division One: 2025–26
