= Sam Habergham =

English footballer (born 1992)

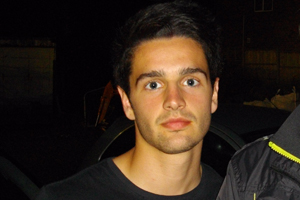

Personal information
- Full name: Samuel George Frederick Habergham
- Date of birth: 20 February 1992 (age 34)
- Place of birth: Rotherham, England
- Height: 1.83 m (6 ft 0 in)
- Position: Left back

Youth career
- 1999–2009: Norwich City

Senior career*
Years	Team	Apps	(Gls)
2009–2011	Norwich City	0	(0)
2011–2012	Tamworth	30	(0)
2012–2016	Braintree Town	172	(0)
2016–2019	Lincoln City	76	(3)
2021	Grimsby Town	13	(0)
2022	Peninsula Power	9	(1)
2022–2023	Wealdstone	36	(1)
2023–2024	Woking	8	(0)
Total		344	(5)

International career
2009	England U17	3	(0)
2016	England C	2	(0)
- * Club domestic league appearances and goals as of 15:30, 7 January 2024 (UTC)

Samuel George Frederick Habergham (born 20 February 1992) is an English former professional footballer who plays as a left back.

A product of the Norwich City academy, he later slipped into Non-League football and made his senior debut for Tamworth. He moved to Braintree Town where he was part of the 2016 side that were beaten in the National League semi-finals, before following manager Danny Cowley to Lincoln City in 2016. Whilst at Sincil Bank he won both the National League title and the EFL Trophy, as well as being part of Cowley's Imps side that reached the FA Cup quarter finals during the 2016–17 season. Spells at Grimsby Town and in Australia with Peninsula Power followed before joining Wealdstone ahead of the 2022–23 campaign. This ended with an eventual switch to fellow National League club, Woking in June 2023.

== Club career ==
Habergham joined the Norwich City youth academy at the age of seven. He was promoted to the first team in 2009 which was managed by Bryan Gunn. In 2011, he joined Tamworth where he managed to make 35 appearances for the club.

In the summer of 2011, Habergham was released by Norwich City. Subsequently, he joined Football Conference club Braintree Town along with former Canary player Josh Dawkin. He was signed by the club as a replacement for Aswad Thomas who left Braintree for Grimsby Town. The club manager Alan Devonshire said that he was impressed by Habergham when he watched him play for Tamworth the previous season.

In 2015–2016 season, Habergham was a part of the Braintree squad that reached the promotion play-offs only to be defeated by Grimsby in the semi-final. At the end of the season, he rejected a contract extension proposal by the club. He instead signed a two-year contract with Lincoln City. He won the National League with the club in his first season and won promotion to EFL League Two.

Habergham made his debut in the 2017–2018 season in an EFL Trophy match against Mansfield Town of EFL League Two replacing Neal Eardley in the squad. Habergham would win the EFL Trophy that season with Lincoln City on the club's first ever trip to Wembley, but he only played three more times before succumbing to the effects of a serious knee injury. He had surgery in 2019, but was released when his contract expired having not played a game during the 2018–19 season.

On 6 January 2021, Habergham joined Grimsby Town on trial and was added to the clubs starting line up for their U23 fixture against Scunthorpe United. On 8 January 2021, Habergham signed for Grimsby on a six-month deal. On 12 May 2021 it was announced that he would leave Grimsby at the end of the season, following the expiry of his contract.

On 10 July 2021, Habergham linked up with his former Lincoln coach Danny Cowley by joining Portsmouth on trial, where he featured in Pompey's 5-2 pre-season victory over Havant & Waterlooville.

In February 2022 he joined Australian side Peninsula Power.

On 11 July 2022 Habergham signed for National League side Wealdstone. He made his debut as a substitute in a 1–0 defeat away to Eastleigh.

On 19 June 2023, Habergham agreed to make the switch to fellow National League side, Woking, signing a one-year deal. On 26 April 2024, it was announced that Habergham would leave Woking at the end of his contract in June.

== International career ==
Habergham was called to the England under 17 team for 2009 UEFA European Under-17 Championship. He played once in the tournament, in a group stage defeat against Turkey. He has also played for the England C twice in 2016.

== Career statistics ==
=== Club ===
As of match played on 6 January 2024

Appearances and goals by club, season and competition
Club	Season	League			FA Cup		League Cup		Other		Total	
Club	Season	Division	Apps	Goals	Apps	Goals	Apps	Goals	Apps	Goals	Apps	Goals
Tamworth	2011–12	Conference Premier	30	0	4	0	—		0	0	34	0
Braintree Town	2012–13	Conference Premier	39	0	1	0	—		1 (Note: Appearances in the FA Trophy)	0	41	0
Braintree Town	2013–14	Conference Premier	42	0	2	0	—		2	0	46	0
Braintree Town	2014–15	Conference Premier	44	0	3	0	—		4	0	51	0
Braintree Town	2015–16	Conference Premier	47	0	3	0	—		2	0	52	0
Braintree Town	Total		172	0	9	0	—		9	0	190	0
Lincoln City	2016–17	National League	43	3	9	0	—		4	1	56	4
Lincoln City	2017–18	League Two	33	0	0	0	0	0	7 (Note: Appearances in the Football League Trophy)	0	40	0
Lincoln City	2018–19	League Two	0	0	0	0	0	0	0	0	0	0
Lincoln City	Total		76	3	9	0	0	0	11	1	96	4
Grimsby Town	2020–21	League Two	13	0	0	0	0	0	0	0	13	0
Peninsula Power	2022	NPL Queensland	9	1	0	0	0	0	0	0	9	1
Wealdstone	2022–23	National League	36	1	1	0	—		2 (Note: 1 appearance in FA Trophy, 1 appearance in Middlesex Senior Cup)	0	39	1
Woking	2023–24	National League	8	0	1	0	—		0	0	9	0
Career total			344	5	24	0	0	0	23	1	390	6

== Honours ==
Lincoln City

- National League: 2016–17
- EFL Trophy: 2017–18
