= Jak Hickman =

English footballer

Personal information
- Full name: Jak Anthony Hickman
- Date of birth: 11 September 1998 (age 28)
- Place of birth: Sandwell, England
- Position: Wing-back

Team information
- Current team: Bromsgrove Sporting

Youth career
- 2008–2016: West Bromwich Albion
- 2016–2017: Coventry City

Senior career*
Years	Team	Apps	(Gls)
2017–2020	Coventry City	0	(0)
2017–2018	→ Mickleover Sports (loan)	18	(0)
2018	→ Ashton United (loan)	2	(0)
2019	→ Hereford (loan)	9	(0)
2019	→ Redditch United (loan)	11	(1)
2019–2020	→ Bromsgrove Sporting (loan)	11	(0)
2020–2021	Bolton Wanderers	4	(0)
2021	→ King's Lynn Town (loan)	1	(0)
2021	St Patrick's Athletic	7	(0)
2021–2022	Stourbridge	5	(0)
2022	King's Lynn Town	10	(0)
2022–2023	Banbury United	32	(2)
2023	→ Halesowen Town (dual registration)	5	(0)
2023–2026	Halesowen Town	103	(6)
2026	Redditch United	0	(0)
2026–	Bromsgrove Sporting	0	(0)
- * Club domestic league appearances and goals as of 14:14, 8 August 2026 (UTC)

Jak Anthony Hickman (born 11 September 1998) is an English professional footballer who plays as a defender for Southern League Premier Division Central club Bromsgrove Sporting.

== Career ==
Hickman started his career in the youth system at West Bromwich Albion, where he played for 8 years before signing a scholarship contract with Coventry City. He made his senior debut for the club in an EFL Trophy game against Forest Green Rovers.

On 13 October 2017, Hickman initially joined Mickleover Sports on a one-month loan with fellow Sky Blue Bilal Sayoud. Then in March 2018 he rejoined the non-league side on loan for the remainder of the season.

During the 2018–19 season Hickman had loan spells with Ashton United and Hereford.

On 4 July 2019, Coventry City announced the fining and placing of Hickman on the transfer list, following disparaging comments made against the club made by Hickman in a video that circulated on social media.

Hickman joined Southern League Premier Central side Bromsgrove Sporting on loan on 22 November 2019.

On 6 August 2020, Hickman signed for Bolton Wanderers, on an initial one-year deal and his competitive debut came on 8 September in a 2–3 home defeat against Crewe Alexandra in the EFL Trophy. His first goal came on 17 November as he scored Bolton's first goal in a 3–2 win against Newcastle United U21 in the EFL Trophy.

On 5 March 2021, Hickman joined National League side King's Lynn Town on loan for the remainder of the 2020–21 season. He only played once due to injury. On 19 May 2021 Bolton announced he would be released at the end of his contract.

Hickman signed for League of Ireland Premier Division club St Patrick's Athletic on 19 August 2021 until the end of the season in November. He made his debut for the club the following night, replacing Jason McClelland at half-time in a 3–1 defeat against Finn Harps at Finn Park. His first assist for the club came on 3 September when his cross was volleyed in by Chris Forrester in a 3–2 win over Longford Town at Richmond Park. On 28 November 2021 Hickman came off the bench in the 2021 FAI Cup Final, as his side defeated rivals Bohemians 4–3 on penalties following a 1–1 draw after extra time in front of a record FAI Cup Final crowd of 37,126 at the Aviva Stadium.

On 10 December 2021, Hickman signed for Southern League Premier Division Central side Stourbridge. He made a total of 6 appearances for the club before having his contract terminated on 17 January 2022 alongside teammate Montel Gibson after the pair allegedly refused to play in an FA Trophy tie with Guiseley as they wanted to go on trial at two other clubs without Stourbridge's permission.

On 5 February 2022, it was announced that Hickman had signed for National League side King's Lynn Town, a club he had previously spent time on loan at during his time with Bolton Wanderers. He was released at the end of the 2021–22 season following relegation.

On 1 July 2022, Hickman signed for National League North side Banbury United on a one-year contract. He made 37 appearances for the club in all competitions, scoring twice.

On 23 March 2023, Hickman signed for Halesowen Town on dual registration. Hickman made 7 appearances over his loan spell as his side won promotion to the Southern Football League via the play-offs. The move was made permanent on 21 June 2023.

In May 2026, Hickman joined Southern League Premier Division Central club Redditch United. On 6 August, prior to the commencement of the season, he departed the club by mutual consent, rejoining Bromsgrove Sporting the following day.

== Career statistics ==
As of end of 2025–26 season

Appearances and goals by club, season and competition
Club	Season	League			National Cup (Note: Includes FA Cup & FAI Cup)		League Cup		Other		Total	
Club	Season	Division	Apps	Goals	Apps	Goals	Apps	Goals	Apps	Goals	Apps	Goals
Coventry City	2017–18	EFL League Two	0	0	0	0	0	0	0	0	0	0
Coventry City	2018–19	EFL League One	0	0	—		0	0	2 (Note: Appearances in EFL Trophy)	0	2	0
Coventry City	2019–20	EFL League One	0	0	—		0	0	0	0	0	0
Coventry City	Total		0	0	0	0	0	0	2	0	2	0
Mickleover Sports (loan)	2017–18	NPL Premier Division	18	0	—		—		1 (Note: Appearances in FA Trophy)	0	19	0
Ashton United (loan)	2018–19	NPL Premier Division	2	0	1	0	—		0	0	3	0
Hereford (loan)	2018–19	National League North	9	0	0	0	—		0	0	9	0
Redditch United (loan)	2019–20	Southern League Premier Central	11	1	1	0	—		2 (Note: Two appearances in Southern League Cup)	0	14	1
Bromsgrove Sporting (loan)	2019–20	Southern League Premier Central	11	0	—		—		1 (Note: One appearance in Worcestershire Senior Cup)	0	12	0
Bolton Wanderers	2020–21	EFL League Two	4	0	0	0	0	0	3	1	7	1
King's Lynn Town (loan)	2020–21	National League	1	0	—		—		0	0	1	0
St Patrick's Athletic	2021	League of Ireland Premier Division	7	0	4	0	—		—		11	0
Stourbridge	2021–22	Southern League Premier Central	5	0	—		—		1	0	6	0
King's Lynn Town	2021–22	National League	10	0	—		—		—		10	0
Banbury United	2022–23	National League North	32	2	1	0	—		4	0	37	2
Halesowen Town (dual registration)	2022–23	NPL Division One Midlands	5	0	—		—		2 (Note: Appearances in 2022–23 NPL Division One Midlands Playoffs)	0	7	0
Halesowen Town	2023–24	Southern League Premier Division Central	28	2	3	0	—		1	33	3	
Halesowen Town	2024–25	Southern League Premier Division Central	41	0	1	0	—		5 (Note: Three appearances in FA Trophy, one appearance in Birmingham Senior Cup, one appearance in Southern League Premier Division Central play-offs)	0	47	0
Halesowen Town	2025–26	Southern League Premier Division Central	34	4	5	1	—		2 (Note: One appearance in FA Trophy, one appearance in Southern League Premier Division Central play-offs)	0	41	5
Halesowen Town	Total		103	6	9	1	0	0	9	1	121	8
Career total			218	9	16	1	0	0	25	2	259	12

== Honours ==
Bolton Wanderers

- EFL League Two third-place (promotion): 2020–21

St Patrick's Athletic

- FAI Cup: 2021

Halesowen Town

- Northern Premier League Division One Midlands play-off (promotion): 2022–23
