= Owen Windsor =

English footballer

Personal information
- Full name: Owen James Windsor
- Date of birth: 17 September 2001 (age 25)
- Height: 1.78 m (5 ft 10 in)
- Position: Striker

Team information
- Current team: Bath City
- Number: 11

Youth career
- Swindon Town
- Southampton

Senior career*
| Years | Team | Apps | (Gls) |
| 2018–2019 | Cirencester Town | 17 | (6) |
| 2019–2022 | West Bromwich Albion | 0 | (0) |
| 2019 | → Cirencester Town (loan) | 1 | (0) |
| 2019–2020 | → Taunton Town (loan) | 7 | (0) |
| 2020 | → Grimsby Town (loan) | 12 | (1) |
| 2021 | → Newport County (loan) | 1 | (0) |
| 2022 | → Carlisle United (loan) | 3 | (1) |
| 2023 | Chippenham Town | 28 | (8) |
| 2023–2024 | Chester | 7 | (1) |
| 2024 | Marine | 10 | (1) |
| 2024–2025 | Leek Town | 4 | (1) |
| 2025 | MetroStars | 24 | (15) |
| 2025– | Bath City | 29 | (5) |
- * Club domestic league appearances and goals as of 13:33, 6 September 2026 (UTC)

Owen James Windsor (born 17 September 2001) is an English footballer who plays as a striker for Bath City.

He has played in the Football League for Grimsby Town, Newport County and Carlisle United whilst on loan from West Bromwich Albion. He has also appeared at Non-league level for Cirencester Town and Taunton Town.

== Career ==
After playing youth football for Swindon Town and Southampton, Windsor began his senior career with Cirencester Town.

After signing for West Bromwich Albion in June 2019, he spent loan spells back at Cirencester, and also with Taunton Town. In October 2020 he moved on loan to Grimsby Town.

Windsor scored twice in thirteen games for Grimsby including a goal in a 3–1 victory over Cheltenham Town, but after falling out of favour with manager Ian Holloway, his season-long loan was cut short on 19 December 2020, shortly before The Mariners 1–0 win over rivals Scunthorpe United.

On 5 January 2021, Windsor signed for Newport County on loan until the end of the 2020–21 season. He made his debut for Newport as a second-half substitute in the 1-1 League Two draw against Cheltenham Town on 19 January 2021. However, on 1 February 2021 Windsor's loan at Newport was cancelled.

On 31 January 2022, Windsor joined League Two club Carlisle United on loan until the end of the 2021–22 season.

Windsor was not retained by West Bromwich Albion at the end of the 2021–22 season.

Windsor signed for Chippenham Town on 3 February 2023. He moved to Chester on 24 November 2023.

On 14 February 2024, Windsor joined Marine until the end of the season.

In October 2024, Windsor joined Northern Premier League Premier Division club Leek Town.

In January 2025 he signed for Australian club MetroStars. Later that year he returned to England with Bath City.

== Career statistics ==
As of match played 11 August 2026

Appearances and goals by club, season and competition
| Club | Season | League | | | National cup (Note: Includes FA Cup, Australia Cup) | | League cup | | Other | | Total | |
| Club | Season | Division | Apps | Goals | Apps | Goals | Apps | Goals | Apps | Goals | Apps | Goals |
|---|---|---|---|---|---|---|---|---|---|---|---|---|
| Cirencester Town | 2018–19 | Southern Football League Division One South | 17 | 6 | 2 | 0 | — | | 4 (Note: One appearance in FA Trophy, one appearance in Southern League Cup, one appearance in Gloucestershire Senior Cup, one appearance in SFL Division One South play-offs) | 0 | 23 | 6 |
| West Bromwich Albion | 2019–20 | Championship | 0 | 0 | 0 | 0 | 0 | 0 | — | | 0 | 0 |
| West Bromwich Albion | 2020–21 | Premier League | 0 | 0 | 0 | 0 | 0 | 0 | — | | 0 | 0 |
| West Bromwich Albion | 2021–22 | Championship | 0 | 0 | 0 | 0 | 0 | 0 | — | | 0 | 0 |
| West Bromwich Albion | Total | | 0 | 0 | 0 | 0 | 0 | 0 | 0 | 0 | 0 | 0 |
| Cirencester Town (loan) | 2019–20 | Southern Football League Division One South | 1 | 0 | 1 | 0 | — | | 0 | 0 | 2 | 0 |
| Taunton Town (loan) | 2019–20 | Southern Football League Premier Division South | 7 | 0 | 0 | 0 | — | | 1 (Note: Appearance in Southern League Cup) | 0 | 8 | 0 |
| Grimsby Town (loan) | 2020–21 | League Two | 12 | 1 | 1 | 1 | 0 | 0 | 0 | 0 | 13 | 2 |
| Newport County (loan) | 2020–21 | League Two | 1 | 0 | — | | 0 | 0 | 0 | 0 | 1 | 0 |
| Carlisle United (loan) | 2021–22 | League Two | 3 | 1 | 0 | 0 | 0 | 0 | 0 | 0 | 3 | 1 |
| Chippenham Town | 2022–23 | National League South | 18 | 4 | 0 | 0 | — | | 1 (Note: Appearance(s) in Wiltshire Premier Shield) | 0 | 19 | 4 |
| Chippenham Town | 2023–24 | National League South | 10 | 4 | 1 | 0 | — | | 0 | 0 | 11 | 4 |
| Chippenham Town | Total | | 28 | 8 | 1 | 0 | 0 | 0 | 1 | 0 | 30 | 8 |
| Chester | 2023–24 | National League North | 7 | 1 | — | | — | | 0 | 0 | 7 | 1 |
| Marine | 2023–24 | Northern Premier League Premier Division | 10 | 1 | — | | — | | 3 (Note: One appearance in Liverpool Senior Cup, two appearances in NPL Premier Division play-offs) | 0 | 13 | 1 |
| Leek Town | 2024–25 | Northern Premier League Premier Division | 4 | 1 | — | | — | | 0 | 0 | 4 | 1 |
| MetroStars | 2025 | National Premier Leagues South Australia | 24 | 15 | 2 | 1 | — | | — | | 26 | 16 |
| Bath City | 2025–26 | National League South | 28 | 5 | — | | — | | 4 (Note: Three appearances and one goal in FA Trophy, one appearance and one goal in Somerset Premier Cup) | 2 | 32 | 7 |
| Bath City | 2026–27 | Southern Football League Premier Division South | 1 | 0 | 0 | 0 | — | | 0 | 0 | 1 | 0 |
| Bath City | Total | | 29 | 5 | 0 | 0 | 0 | 0 | 4 | 2 | 33 | 7 |
| Career total | | | 143 | 38 | 7 | 2 | 2 | 0 | 11 | 2 | 163 | 42 |

== Personal life ==
Windsor attended Hartpury College.
