= Montel Gibson =

English footballer (born 1997)

- Gibson with Larne in 2026

Personal information
- Full name: Montel Gibson
- Date of birth: 15 December 1997 (age 28)
- Place of birth: Birmingham, England
- Position: Forward

Team information
- Current team: Larne
- Number: 45

Youth career
- Highgate United

Senior career*
Years	Team	Apps	(Gls)
2016–2017	Notts County	5	(0)
2016	→ Romulus (loan)		
2016	→ Barwell (loan)	8	(1)
2016–2017	→ Hednesford Town (loan)		
2017	→ Sutton Coldfield Town (loan)		
2017–2018	Ilkeston Town	28	(13)
2018	Redditch United	21	(2)
2018–2019	Bedworth United	14	(3)
2019–2020	Halesowen Town	26	(19)
2020–2021	Grimsby Town	17	(2)
2021	→ Altrincham (loan)	2	(0)
2021	→ Stourbridge (loan)	14	(3)
2021–2022	Stourbridge	16	(15)
2022–2023	Ilkeston Town	13	(7)
2022	→ AFC Telford United (loan)	3	(1)
2022–2023	→ AFC Telford United (loan)	24	(7)
2023–2024	AFC Telford United	38	(13)
2024	Hereford	8	(2)
2024–2025	Matlock Town	37	(23)
2025	→ Hereford (loan)	3	(1)
2025–2026	Hednesford Town		
2026–	Larne	0	(0)
- * Club domestic league appearances and goals as of 13:06, 22 June 2026 (UTC)

Montel Gibson (born 15 December 1997) is an English professional footballer who plays as a forward for NIFL Premiership club Larne.

He has previously played professionally for Notts County and Grimsby Town. Having started his career with County he went on to play at Non-League level for Romulus, Barwell, Hednesford Town, Sutton Coldfield Town, Ilkeston Town, Redditch United, Bedworth United, Halesowen Town, Altrincham and Stourbridge.

== Playing career ==
=== Notts County ===
Gibson began his career as a youngster for Highgate United before being signed by League Two side Notts County following some impressive displays at Highgate United during the 2015–16 season, Montel made his debut for the club on 12 April 2016 in a home League Two 1–0 victory against Hartlepool United, coming on as an 81st-minute substitute for matchwinner Jon Stead. Montel went onto make a further 3 League Two substitute appearances in April 2016, a 5–0 away defeat to Mansfield Town, coming on again for Jon Stead on the 63rd minute, a 3–1 away defeat to Barnet, coming on for Izale McLeod on the 62nd minute, and a 2–1 home defeat to Cambridge United coming on for Alan Smith on the 74th minute.

For the 2016–17 season, manager John Sheridan decided to give Montel some time out on loan. The first loan move came on 18 August 2016, when he joined Romulus

Gibson's second loan came on 7 October 2016, when he joined Barwell on a months loan, and made his debut on 10 October 2016 against Nantwich Town and received the man of the match award for his performance.

Montel was again loaned out during the 2016–17 season, this time to Hednesford Town on 2 December 2016.

Montel returned from his loan from Hednesford Town, and made his final appearance for Notts County in an away League Two 2–0 defeat to Grimsby Town. Montel again coming on as a substitute on the 70th minute for Jonathan Forte.

Gibson's last loan of the season came on 17 February 2017 with Sutton Coldfield Town, he joined alongside teammate Dominic Brown-Hill on a youth loan.

On 16 May 2017 Kevin Nolan announced the Notts County retained list, Montel's contract had expired, he was offered a chance to gain a new contract in pre-season, however this never came to fruition, and he left the club.

=== Ilkeston Town ===
In July 2017 Montel signed for the newly formed Ilkeston Town, teaming up with manager Steve Chettle, and a full new first team squad.

Following regular appearances for Ilkeston Town, it was confirmed that Gibson had left the club on 11 March 2018. Steve Chettle suggested that difficulty traveling from Birmingham was the main reason for the departure.

=== Redditch United ===
On 16 March 2018 Gibson was signed by Tim Harris for Redditch United.

New Redditch United manager Paul Davis gave Gibson a contract for the 2018–19 season, which he signed on 15 June 2018, along with teammates Jamie Ashmore, Luke Keen and Max Loveridge.

=== Bedworth United ===
On 19 November 2018 Gibson moved to fellow Southern League Premier Central side Bedworth United. He made his debut the following day in a home fixture against Tamworth, and hit the ground running, by scoring on his debut, giving his side the lead on the 36th minute, however Tamworth went onto win the match 4–1.

Gibson scored his second goal for Bedworth in a home fixture against Leiston on 15 December 2018, scoring after 2 minutes in a 2–2 draw. He added his third goal to his goalscoring tally on 19 January 2018, in a home fixture against AFC Rushden & Diamonds, which the away team won 3–1.

=== Grimsby Town ===
Gibson was signed by Ian Holloway for EFL League Two side Grimsby Town in August 2020 on a three-year contract. He scored his first goal for the club in an EFL Trophy tie against Harrogate Town on 8 September 2020. On 1 March 2021, Gibson joined National League side Altrincham on a one-month loan.

On 22 March 2021, Gibson caused controversy when he broke COVID-19 lockdown rules in which he posted a video to social media from a gender reveal party he was hosting for his unborn child. The video caused anger amongst Grimsby supporters and his manager Paul Hurst, in response Gibson apologised to the fans, his manager and the club. Following on from Grimsby's relegation from the Football League at the end of the 2020–21 season, Gibson was deemed surplus to requirements and was transfer listed with the player being made available on a free transfer.

On 2 July 2021, Gibson joined Stourbridge on a loan deal to run through until January 2022.

On 9 November 2021, Gibson was released from his contract by mutual consent. He was fifteen months into his three-year contract.

=== Stourbridge ===
Gibson continued with Stourbridge and on his first game following his release he scored both goals in a 2–1 win away at Carlton Town in the FA Trophy.

On 17 January 2022, Gibson announced via his Twitter account that he had left Stourbridge and was now a free agent.

On 18 January 2022, Stourbridge announced they had terminated the contracts of Gibson and teammate Jak Hickman due to their refusal to play in the FA Trophy fourth round tie with Guiseley. Gibson reacted to the club's announcement, stating the club had refused his and Hickman's request to attend trials at professional clubs, but stated despite this that he had never refused to play in the Guiseley game.

=== Return to Ilkeston Town ===
On 25 January 2022, Gibson rejoined Northern Premier League Division One Midlands side Ilkeston Town on an 18-month contract.

On 27 September 2022, Gibson signed for National League North club AFC Telford United on loan until the end of the 2022–23 season. Gibson's loan was cancelled in October 2022 due to work commitments and travel issues, however he returned to the club in November 2022 on a further loan until the end of the season.

=== AFC Telford United ===
Ahead of the 2023–24 season, Gibson signed a one-year contract with AFC Telford United.

=== Hereford ===
On 18 June 2024, Gibson stepped up a level to join National League North club Hereford.

=== Matlock Town ===
On 9 September 2024, it was announced that Gibson had signed for Northern Premier League club Matlock Town for an undisclosed fee, with work commitments cited as the reason for his sudden departure from Hereford. He had his contract terminated by mutual consent on 26 April following relegation. The following week however, he returned to the club following conversations with the manager. On 1 September 2025, Gibson returned to Hereford on loan until the end of the season. His loan spell at Hereford ended when his contract with Matlock was terminated on 2 October 2025.

=== Hednesford Town ===
On 10 October 2025, Gibson signed for Northern Premier League Premier Division club Hednesford Town, returning to the club he joined on loan in 2016. Despite earning promotion to the National League North, his departure from the club was announced on 25 May 2026, 10 days after agreeing to stay for the 2026–27 season.

=== Larne ===
On 18 June 2026, Gibson signed for NIFL Premiership club Larne.

== Career statistics ==
As of match played 20 September 2025

Club	Season	League			FA Cup		League Cup		Other		Total	
Club	Season	Division	Apps	Goals	Apps	Goals	Apps	Goals	Apps	Goals	Apps	Goals
Notts County	2015–16	League Two	4	0	0	0	0	0	0	0	4	0
Notts County	2016–17	League Two	1	0	0	0	0	0	0	0	1	0
Notts County	Total		5	0	—		—		—		5	0
Ilkeston Town	2017–18	Midland Division One	28	13	—		—		—		28	13
Redditch United	2017–18	SL Premier Division	—		—		—		—		—	
Redditch United	2018–19	SL Premier Division Central	8	5	—		—		—		8	5
Redditch United	Total		8	5	—		—		—		8	5
Bedworth United	2018–19	SL Premier Division Central	14	3	—		—		—		14	3
Halesowen Town	2019–20	SL Division One Central	26	19	4	6	—		16 (Note: One appearance in Southern League Cup; 13 appearances, five goals in FA Trophy; two appearances, one goal in Birmingham Senior Cup)	6	46	31
Grimsby Town	2020–21	League Two	19	2	1	0	1	0	2 (Note: Appearance(s) in EFL Trophy)	1	23	3
Altrincham (loan)	2020–21	National League	2	0	—		—		—		2	0
Stourbridge	2021–22	SL Premier Division Central	23	10	1	0	—		6 (Note: Four appearances, five goals in FA Trophy; two appearances, three goals in Birmingham Senior Cup)	8	30	18
Ilkeston Town	2022–23	SL Premier Division Central	13	7	3	1	—		0	0	16	8
AFC Telford United (loan)	2022–23	National League North	3	1	—		—		—		3	1
AFC Telford United (loan)	2022–23	National League North	24	7	—		—		1 (Note: Appearance(s) in FA Trophy)	0	25	7
AFC Telford United (loan)	Total		27	8	—		—		1	0	28	8
AFC Telford United	2023–24	SL Premier Division Central	38	13	1	0	—		3 (Note: One appearance in FA Trophy; two appearances, one goal in Southern League Premier Division Central play-offs)	1	42	14
Hereford	2024–25	National League North	8	2	—		—		—		8	2
Matlock Town	2024–25	NPL Premier Division	35	22	—		—		2 (Note: One appearance in FA Trophy; one appearance in Derbyshire Senior Cup)	0	37	22
Matlock Town	2025–26	NPL Division One East	2	1	1	1	—		0	0	3	2
Matlock Town	Total		37	23	1	1	—		2	0	40	24
Hereford (loan)	2025–26	National League North	3	1	—		—		0	0	3	1
Hednesford Town	2025–26	NPL Premier Division	0	0	—		—		0	0	0	0
Career total (Note: Statistics for loans spells at Romulus, Barwell, Hednesford Town and Sutton Coldfield Town during 2016–17 Northern Premier League season not available)			251	106	11	8	1	0	30	16	293	130

== Honours ==
Larne

- NIFL Charity Shield 2026
