= Louis Boyd =

English footballer

Personal information
- Full name: Louis Norman Boyd
- Date of birth: 22 October 2004 (age 22)
- Place of birth: Grimsby, England
- Positions: Defender; midfielder

Team information
- Current team: Winterton Rangers

Youth career
- 2016–2023: Grimsby Town

Senior career*
Years	Team	Apps	(Gls)
2020–2021	Grimsby Town	1	(0)
2023–2024	Cleethorpes Town	34	(0)
2024	Barton Town	10	(0)
2024–2025	Lincoln United	3	(0)
2025–	Winterton Rangers	0	(0)
- * Club domestic league appearances and goals as of 12:34, 8 August 2024 (UTC)

Louis Norman Boyd (born 22 October 2004) is an English footballer who plays as a midfielder for Winterton Rangers.

He played two professional games for Grimsby Town as a 15 year old during the 2020–21 season, setting both club records for youngest appearances holder and youngest goal-scorer. He remained with the club until the end of the 2022–23 season but had only played for the youth team in his final two seasons. By the time he was released he had not been a part of Grimsby's first team squad since September 2020.

== Career ==
=== Grimsby Town ===
At the age of 15, he made his debut and scored his first goal in the EFL Trophy tie against Harrogate Town on 8 September 2020, breaking two club records for the youngest appearance holder and youngest goal-scorer.

On 12 September 2020, Boyd made his league debut as he came on as a 70th-minute substitute for Danny Rose in a 1–0 away defeat against Walsall. On 19 September 2020, Boyd was an unused substitute in Grimsby's 4–0 home defeat to Salford City which would be his final inclusion in a first team squad during the 2020–21 season.

On 23 October 2020, manager Ian Holloway revealed that a "very, very big" Scottish side had made an enquiry about Boyd and teammate Ben Grist following rumours of interest from both Chelsea and Liverpool.

For the 2021–22 season, Boyd was not handed a first team squad number and was continuing to feature for the club's youth team. For the 2022–23 season Boyd once more was continuing to play for Grimsby's youth team.

=== Non-League ===
Having not been offered a professional contract following the end of his time in the Grimsby youth team, Boyd signed for non-league side Cleethorpes Town.

During the 2024–25 season, Boyd spent time with both Barton Town and Lincoln United.

In July 2025, Boyd signed for Winterton Rangers

== Career statistics ==
=== Club ===
As of 28 June 2021

Appearances and goals by club, season and competition
Club	Season	League			National Cup		League Cup		Continental		Other		Total	
Club	Season	Division	Apps	Goals	Apps	Goals	Apps	Goals	Apps	Goals	Apps	Goals	Apps	Goals
Grimsby Town	2020–21	League Two	1	0	0	0	0	0	–		1 (Note: Appearances in the EFL Trophy)	1	2	1
Career total			1	0	0	0	0	0	0	0	1	1	2	1
