= Danny Preston =

English footballer (born 2000)

Personal information
- Full name: Daniel James Preston
- Date of birth: 6 August 2000 (age 26)
- Position: Left back

Team information
- Current team: Alfreton Town

Youth career
- 2016–2019: Nottingham Forest

Senior career*
Years	Team	Apps	(Gls)
2019–2021	Nottingham Forest	0	(0)
2019–2020	→ Alfreton Town (loan)	8	(0)
2020–2021	→ Grimsby Town (loan)	25	(0)
2021–	Alfreton Town	62	(1)
- * Club domestic league appearances and goals as of 18 June 2023

Daniel James Preston (born 6 August 2000) is an English professional footballer who plays as a left back for Alfreton Town in the National League North.

== Career ==
=== Nottingham Forest ===
Preston joined the Nottingham Forest academy in 2016. During the 2018–19 season, Preston trained with the first team under Aitor Karanka.

On 5 December 2019, Preston moved on loan to National League North side Alfreton Town. Preston made 8 appearances for Alfreton during his spell at the club.

On 3 September 2020, Preston made his second loan spell, joining EFL League Two side Grimsby Town on a season-long loan. He made his debut on 5 September 2020, starting in an EFL Cup match against Morecambe.

On 1 February 2021, Preston was recalled from his loan spell at Grimsby, having made 29 appearances.

=== Alfreton Town ===
At the end of the season, Preston was released by Forest. He spent time on trial with Forest Green Rovers in September 2021.

On 30 October 2021, Preston signed with National League North side Alfreton Town.
