= Ira Jackson Jr =

English footballer (born 1997)

Ira Jackson Jr.
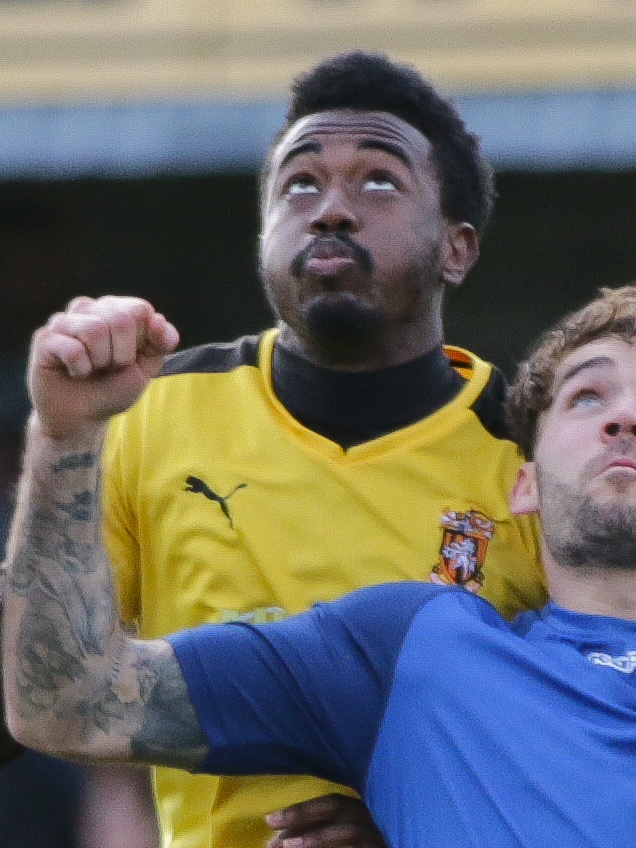
- Jackson with Folkestone Invicta in March 2019

Personal information
- Date of birth: 28 January 1997 (age 29)
- Place of birth: Ashford, England
- Position: Forward

Senior career*
Years	Team	Apps	(Gls)
2013	Faversham Town		
2013–2014	Ashford United	8	(0)
2014–2015	Ramsgate	16	(3)
2014–2015	→ Canterbury City (loan)	6	(1)
2015	Lordswood	9	(1)
2015–2016	Whitstable Town		
2016	Worthing	8	(0)
2016–2017	Dover Athletic	4	(0)
2017	→ Margate (loan)	10	(4)
2017	Leatherhead	0	(0)
2017–2018	Ashford United	12	(1)
2018	Sittingbourne	12	(4)
2018–2020	Folkestone Invicta	47	(28)
2020–2021	Grimsby Town	20	(3)
2021–2022	Wealdstone	23	(4)
2022–2024	Folkestone Invicta	60	(21)
Total		235	(62)

Managerial career
- 2025: Hythe Town
- * Club domestic league appearances and goals

Ira Jackson Jr. (born 28 January 1997) is an English former footballer who played as a forward. He was most recently the manager of Hythe Town.

Jackson notably played in the Football League for Grimsby Town during the 2020–21 season, prior to this he had played Non-League football for Faversham Town, Ashford United, Ramsgate, Canterbury City, Lordswood, Whitstable Town, Worthing, Dover Athletic, Margate, Leatherhead, Sittingbourne and Folkestone Invicta.

== Career ==
=== Early career ===
Jackson played for Faversham Town, Ashford United, Ramsgate, Canterbury City, Lordswood, Whitstable Town, Worthing, Dover Athletic, Margate, Leatherhead and Sittingbourne before joining Folkestone in the 2018-19 season.

=== Grimsby Town ===
On 11 August 2020, Jackson Jr. joined Grimsby Town on a two-year contract following a prolific season with Folkestone Invicta that saw him score 26 goals in 36 appearances in the Isthmian Premier Division. He made his debut for the club on 8 September 2020, in a 2–2 EFL Trophy group-stage draw with Harrogate Town, a match won by Grimsby 5–4 on penalties, with Jackson scoring the winning penalty in the shootout. He made his league debut on 12 December 2020, coming off of the bench in the 57 minute before opening the scoring just six minutes later.

Following on from Grimsby's relegation from the Football League at the end of the 2020–21 season, Jackson was deemed surplus to requirements and was transfer listed by manager Paul Hurst with the player being made available on a free transfer.

On 6 September 2021, Jackson Jr. was released from his contract by mutual consent, he left the club having made 22 appearances in all competitions scoring 3 goals.

=== Wealdstone ===
On 7 September 2021, Jackson Jr. signed for National League side Wealdstone following his release from Grimsby. On 18 September, Jackson Jr. scored his first goal for the club on his full debut when he opened the scoring in a 2–2 draw with Aldershot Town. Jackson scored went on to score a total of 4 league goals in 23 appearances for Wealdstone, as well as finding the net in a Middlesex Charity Cup tie against Bedfont & Feltham. On 17 May 2022, it was announced that Jackson Jr. had left the club.

=== Return to Folkestone Invicta ===
On 10 August 2022, Jackson Jr. returned to Folkestone Invicta.

On 31 January 2024, Jackson announced his departure from Folkestone Invicta, stepping away from football for personal reasons whilst continuing coaching.

== Coaching career ==
In February 2025, following a spell managing the Corinthian under-23 side, Jackson Jr. joined Sheppey United as first-team coach.

On 3 May 2025, Jackson was announced as the new manager of Hythe Town, before departing on 8 November 2025.

== Career statistics ==
Appearances and goals by club, season and competition
Club	Season	League			FA Cup		League Cup		Other		Total	
Club	Season	Division	Apps	Goals	Apps	Goals	Apps	Goals	Apps	Goals	Apps	Goals
Ashford United	2013–14	Southern Counties East League	8	0	0	0	3	0	0	0	11	0
Ramsgate	2014–15	Isthmian League Division One South	16	3	2	1	—		2 (Note: Appearance(s) in Alan Turvey Trophy)	0	20	4
Canterbury City (loan)	2014–15	Southern Counties East League	6	1			—				6	1
Lordswood	2014–15	Southern Counties East League	9	1			—				9	1
Worthing	2015–16	Isthmian League Division One South	8	0	0	0	—		0	0	8	0
Dover Athletic	2016–17	National League	4	0	1	0	—		0	0	5	0
Margate (loan)	2016–17	National League South	10	4	0	0	—		0	0	10	4
Leatherhead	2017–18	Isthmian League Premier Division	0	0	0	0	—		1 (Note: Appearances in the FA Trophy)	0	1	0
Ashford United	2017–18	Isthmian League Division One South	12	1	0	0	—		0	0	12	1
Sittingbourne	2018–19	Isthmian League South East Division	12	4	2	2	—		5 (Note: Two appearances in FA Trophy, three appearances in Alan Turvey Trophy)	0	19	6
Folkestone Invicta	2018–19	Isthmian League Premier Division	15	7	—		—		0	0	15	7
Folkestone Invicta	2019–20	Isthmian League Premier Division	32	21	2	2	—		2	1	36	24
Grimsby Town	2020–21	League Two	20	3	0	0	0	0	2 (Note: Appearance(s) in EFL Trophy)	0	22	3
Wealdstone	2021-22	National League	23	4	1	0	—		2 (Note: One appearance in FA Trophy, one appearance in Middlesex Charity Cup)	1 (Note: One goal in Middlesex Charity Cup)	26	5
Folkestone Invicta	2022–23	Isthmian League Premier Division	42	10	4	1	—		4 (Note: Three appearances and one goal in FA Trophy, one appearance in Alan Turvey Trophy)	1	50	12
Folkestone Invicta	2023–24	Isthmian League Premier Division	18	3	3	3	—		3 (Note: One appearance and two goals in FA Trophy, one appearance in Kent Senior Cup, one appearance in Alan Turvey Trophy)	2	24	8
Folkestone Invicta	Folkestone Invicta total		107	41	9	6	—		9	4	125	51
Career Total			235	62	15	9	3	0	21	5	274	76
