= 2019–20 Grimsby Town F.C. season =

Grimsby Town F.C.
2019–20 season
- Chairman: John Fenty
- Manager: Michael Jolley (until 31 December); Ian Holloway (from 31 December)
- Stadium: Blundell Park
- League Two: 15th
- FA Cup: First round
- EFL Cup: Third round
- EFL Trophy: Group stage
Home colours	Away colours	Third colours

The 2019–20 season is Grimsby Town's 142nd season of existence and their fourth consecutive season in League Two. Along with competing in League Two, the club will also participate in the FA Cup, EFL Cup and EFL Trophy.

The season covers the period from 1 July 2019 to 30 June 2020.

== Transfers ==
=== Transfers in ===
Date	Position	Nationality	Name	From	Fee	Ref.
1 July 2019	CF	(England)	Matt Green	(England) Salford City	Free transfer	
1 July 2019	CF	(England)	James Hanson	(England) AFC Wimbledon	Free transfer	
1 July 2019	RB	(Wales)	Elliott Hewitt	(England) Notts County	Free transfer	
1 July 2019	CF	(Nigeria)	Moses Ogbu	(Saudi Arabia) Al-Ain	Free transfer	
16 August 2019	CB	(England)	Luke Waterfall	(England) Shrewsbury Town	Free transfer	
9 January 2020	AM	(Republic of Ireland)	Billy Clarke	(England) Plymouth Argyle	Free transfer	
15 January 2020	AM	(England)	James Tilley	(England) Bighton & Hove Albion	Undisclosed	
31 January 2020	LB	(Republic of Ireland)	Bradley Garmston	(England) Gillingham	Free transfer	
31 January 2020	RW	(France)	Elliot Grandin	(France) Saint-Pierroise	Undisclosed	

=== Loans in ===
Date	Position	Nationality	Name	From	Date until	Ref.
1 July 2019	LB	(England)	Liam Gibson	(England) Newcastle United	1 January 2020	
2 September 2019	CM	(England)	Ethan Robson	(England) Sunderland	1 January 2020	
7 January 2020	LB	(England)	Anthony Glennon	(England) Burnley	30 June 2020	
16 January 2020	CM	(England)	Josh Benson	(England) Burnley	30 June 2020	

=== Loans out ===
Date	Position	Nationality	Name	To	Date until	Ref.
1 August 2019	LW	(England)	Brandon Buckley	(England) Cleethorpes Town	January 2020	
1 August 2019	CM	(England)	Jock Curran	(England) Lincoln United	January 2020	
14 August 2019	GK	(England)	Ollie Battersby	(England) Lincoln United	September 2019	
8 November 2019	AM	(England)	Charles Vernam	(England) Chorley	December 2019	

=== Transfers out ===
Date	Position	Nationality	Name	To	Fee	Ref.
1 July 2019	CF	(England)	Rumarn Burrell	(England) Middlesbrough	Undisclosed	
1 July 2019	CB	(Wales)	Danny Collins	Retired	Released	
1 July 2019	RB	(England)	Reece Hall-Johnson	(England) Northampton Town	Free transfer	
1 July 2019	CF	(England)	JJ Hooper	(Wales) Wrexham	Released	
1 July 2019	CF	(England)	Wes Thomas	(England) Notts County	Released	
1 July 2019	CB	(England)	Alex Whitmore	(England) AFC Fylde	Free transfer	
1 July 2019	LM	(England)	Martyn Woolford	(England) Hyde United	Released	
22 December 2019	LB	(Sweden)	Sebastian Ring	(Sweden) Kalmar FF	Mutual consent	
14 January 2020	CF	(Nigeria)	Moses Ogbu	(Sweden) Mjällby	Mutual consent	

== Pre-season ==
Grimsby revealed their pre-season programme in June 2019.

6 July 2019 Friendly	Cleethorpes Town	0–8	Grimsby Town	Cleethorpes
15:00 BST		Report	Green; Hanson 19', 34', 45+1'; Wright 55', 58', 62'; Rose 60'	Stadium: Linden Club

9 July 2019 Friendly	Grantham Town	1–3	Grimsby Town	Grantham
19:30 BST	Westcarr 21'	Report	Hanson 8'; Pollock 77'; Rose 90' (pen.)	Stadium: South Kesteven Sports Stadium

11 July 2019 Friendly	Boston United	2–1	Grimsby Town	Boston
19:30 BST	Thewlis 49' (pen.); Trialist 86'	Report	Green 64'	Stadium: The Jakesman Stadium

18 July 2019 Friendly	Gainsborough Trinity	2–0	Grimsby Town	Gainsborough
19:30 BST	Worsfold 20'; Middleton 90+3'	Report		Stadium: Gainsborough Martin & Co. Arena

20 July 2019 Friendly	Grimsby Town	1–0	Doncaster Rovers	Cleethorpes
12:30 BST	Hessenthaler 84'			Stadium: Blundell Park

23 July 2019 Friendly	Scarborough Athletic	1–2	Grimsby Town	Scarborough
19:30 BST	Walshaw 57'	Report	Ring 12'; Ogbu 43' (pen.)	Stadium: Flamingo Land Stadium

27 July 2019 Friendly	Grimsby Town	0–2	Peterborough United	Cleethorpes
15:00 BST		Report	Eisa 21'; Dembélé 74'	Stadium: Blundell Park; Attendance: 1,573

== First Team Squad ==
#	Name	Nationality	Position	Date of birth (age)	Signed from	Signed in	Contract ends
Goalkeepers
—	James McKeown	(Republic of Ireland)	GK	24 July 1989 (aged 30)	RKSV Leonidas (Netherlands)	2011	2021
—	Sam Russell	(England)	GK	4 October 1982 (aged 36)	Forest Green Rovers (England)	2018	????
—	Ollie Battersby	(England)	GK	23 July 2001 (aged 18)	Academy	2017	2021
Defenders
—	Luke Hendrie	(England)	RB	27 August 1994 (aged 24)	Shrewsbury Town (England)	2019	2021
—	Elliott Hewitt	(Wales)	RB/CM	30 May 1994 (aged 25)	Notts County (England)	2019	2021
—	Ludvig Öhman	(Sweden)	CB	9 October 1991 (aged 27)	BP (Sweden)	2019	2021
—	Harry Davis	(England)	CB	4 September 1991 (aged 27)	St Mirren (Scotland)	2018	2020
—	Mattie Pollock	(Wales)	CB	28 September 2001 (aged 17)	Academy	2018	2021
—	Sebastian Ring	(Sweden)	LB	18 April 1995 (aged 24)	ÖSK (Sweden)	2019	2020
—	Liam Gibson	(England)	LB	25 April 1997 (aged 22)	Newcastle United (England) (Loan)	2019	2020
Midfielders
—	Jake Hessenthaler	(England)	CM	20 April 1994 (aged 25)	Gillingham (England)	2018	2020
—	Elliott Whitehouse	(England)	CM	27 October 1993 (aged 25)	Lincoln City (England)	2018	2020
—	Harry Clifton	(Wales)	CM	12 June 1998 (aged 21)	Academy	2007	2021
—	Jock Curran	(England)	CM	29 January 2001 (aged 18)	Academy	2017	2020
—	Charles Vernam	(England)	CAM/CF	8 October 1996 (aged 22)	Derby County (England)	2018	2020
—	Jordan Cook	(England)	CAM/CF	20 March 1990 (aged 29)	Luton Town (England)	2018	2020
—	Brandon Buckley	(England)	CAM	21 September 2000 (aged 18)	Academy	2009	2020
—	Max Wright	(England)	RW	6 April 1998 (aged 21)	Academy	2008	2020
Attackers
—	James Hanson	(England)	ST	9 November 1987 (aged 31)	AFC Wimbledon (England)	2019	2021
—	Matt Green	(England)	ST	2 January 1987 (aged 32)	Salford City (England)	2019	2021
—	Moses Ogbu	(Nigeria)	ST	7 February 1991 (aged 28)	Al-Ain (Saudi Arabia)	2019	2020
—	Harry Cardwell	(Scotland)	ST	28 October 1996 (aged 22)	Reading (England)	2017	2020
—	Ahkeem Rose	(Jamaica)	ST	27 November 1998 (aged 20)	Heather St John's (England)	2017	2020

Players' ages are as of the opening day of the 2019–20 season (Friday 2 August).

== Competitions ==
=== League Two ===
==== League table ====
Pos	Team	Pld	W	D	L	GF	GA	GD	Pts	PPG
11	Salford City	37	13	11	13	49	46	+3	50	1.35
12	Walsall	36	13	8	15	40	49	−9	47	1.31
13	Crawley Town	37	11	15	11	51	47	+4	48	1.30
14	Newport County	36	12	10	14	32	39	−7	46	1.28
15	Grimsby Town	37	12	11	14	45	51	−6	47	1.27
16	Cambridge United	37	12	9	16	40	48	−8	45	1.22
17	Leyton Orient	36	10	12	14	47	55	−8	42	1.17
18	Carlisle United	37	10	12	15	39	56	−17	42	1.14
19	Oldham Athletic	37	9	14	14	44	57	−13	41	1.11

Source: EFL Official Website
Rules for classification: 1) Points per game; 2) Goal difference; 3) Number of goals scored; 4) Head-to-head results; 5) Wins; 6) Away goals; 7) Penalty points (sec 9.5); 8) 12-point sending off offences

==== Results summary ====
Overall								Home						Away					
Pld	W	D	L	GF	GA	GD	Pts	W	D	L	GF	GA	GD	W	D	L	GF	GA	GD
37	12	11	14	45	51	−6	47	6	5	7	22	27	−5	6	6	7	23	24	−1

Last updated: 7 March 2020.
Source: BBC

==== Results by matchday ====
Matchday	1	2	3	4	5	6	7	8	9	10	11	12	13	14	15	16	17	18	19	20	21	22	23	24	25	26	27	28	29	30	31	32	33	34	35	36	37
Ground	A	H	A	H	H	A	H	A	A	H	A	H	A	H	A	A	H	H	A	H	A	H	H	A	A	H	A	H	H	A	A	H	A	H	H	A	A
Result	W	D	L	D	W	W	L	D	L	W	W	L	L	L	D	L	D	L	D	L	D	D	W	W	D	L	L	W	D	D	W	W	L	W	L	L	W
Position	2	4	13	14	7	4	7	9	11	9	7	9	10	14	16	19	18	20	20	20	20	21	18	17	17	17	19	15	17	18	16	15	16	14	14	14	14

Updated to match(es) played on 7 March 2020. Source: Statto.com
A = Away; H = Home; W = Win; D = Draw; L = Loss

==== Matches ====
On Thursday, 20 June 2019, the EFL League Two fixtures were revealed.

3 August 2019 1	Morecambe	0–2	Grimsby Town	Morecambe
15:00 BST	Old (yellow card) 56'; Kenyon (yellow card) 59'; Alessandra (yellow card) 73'	Report	Green (yellow card) 58'; Whitehouse 68'; Clifton (yellow card) 74'; Wright 90+7'	Stadium: Globe Arena; Attendance: 2,872; Referee: Darren Handley

10 August 2019 2	Grimsby Town	1–1	Bradford City	Cleethorpes
13:00 BST	Öhman (yellow card) 3'; Hanson 66'; Clifton (yellow card) 77'	Report	Vaughan 53'; Anderson (yellow card) 68'	Stadium: Blundell Park; Attendance: 6,882; Referee: Ben Toner

17 August 2019 3	Forest Green Rovers	1–0	Grimsby Town	Nailsworth
15:00 BST	Winchester (yellow card) 31'; Mondal 75'	Report		Stadium: The New Lawn; Attendance: 2,152; Referee: Leigh Doughty

20 August 2019 4	Grimsby Town	2–2	Colchester United	Cleethorpes
19:45 BST	Hewitt (yellow card) 10'; Hanson 48' (pen.); Davis (yellow card) 68'; Green 87'	Report	Nouble 25'; Norris 45+1'; Comley (yellow card) 90+4'	Stadium: Blundell Park; Attendance: 4,103; Referee: Rob Lewis

24 August 2019 5	Grimsby Town	5–2	Port Vale	Cleethorpes
15:00 BST	Cook 20'; Ogbu 51'; Green 57'; Whitehouse (yellow card) 72'; Waterfall 80'; Hanson 86'; Hewitt (yellow card) 90'	Report	Whitehouse 13' (o.g.); Worrall (yellow card) 54'; Smith 62'; Joyce (yellow card) 73'	Stadium: Blundell Park; Attendance: 4,290; Referee: Will Finnie

31 August 2019 6	Walsall	1–3	Grimsby Town	Walsall
15:00 BST	Lavery 5'; Pring (yellow card) 80'	Report	Öhman (yellow card) 20'; Whitehouse 41'; Hanson 68', 81' (pen.)	Stadium: Banks's Stadium; Attendance: 4,812; Referee: David Rock

7 September 2019 7	Grimsby Town	0–2	Crewe Alexandra	Cleethorpes
15:00 BST	Hanson (penalty missed) 28' (yellow card) 49'	Report	Lowery 46'; Powell (yellow card) 62'; Kirk 90+1' (yellow card) 90+2'	Stadium: Blundell Park; Attendance: 4,679; Referee: Anthony Coggins

14 September 2019 8	Oldham Athletic	2–2	Grimsby Town	Oldham
15:00 BST	Missilou 19'; Morais 66'; Sylla (yellow card) 84'	Report	Ogbu (yellow card) 46'; Hendrie (yellow card) 61'; Hewitt (yellow card) 69'; Cook 81'; Vernam (yellow card) 89'; Öhman 90'	Stadium: Boundary Park; Attendance: 3,789; Referee: Sam Purkiss

17 September 2019 9	Salford City	1–0	Grimsby Town	Salford
19:45 BST	Shelton 21'	Report	Cook (yellow card) 24'	Stadium: The Peninsula Stadium; Attendance: 2,782; Referee: Chris Sarginson

21 September 2019 10	Grimsby Town	1–0	Macclesfield Town	Cleethorpes
15:00 BST	Robson 56'	Report		Stadium: Blundell Park; Attendance: 3,794; Referee: David Webb

28 September 2019 11	Exeter City	1–3	Grimsby Town	Exeter
15:00 BST	Collins (yellow card) 32'; Moxey (yellow card) 59'; Sweeney (yellow card) 76'; Taylor (yellow card) 82'; Bowman 90+4'	Report	Gibson (yellow card) 22'; Robson 23', 67' (yellow card) 25'; Ogbu 59' (pen.); Hessenthaler (yellow card) 69'; Wright (yellow card) 77'	Stadium: St James Park; Attendance: 4,973; Referee: Brett Huxtbale

5 October 2019 12	Grimsby Town	0–1	Mansfield Town	Cleethorpes
15:00 BST	Cook (yellow card) 42'; Green (yellow card) 69'; Hendrie (yellow card) 90+5'	Report	Bishop (yellow card) 58'; White (red card) 60'; Pearce 90+6'	Stadium: Blundell Park; Attendance: 5,087; Referee: Paul Marsden

12 October 2019 13	Stevenage	2–1	Grimsby Town	Stevenage
15:00 BST	Guthrie 17'; Carter 44'; Farman (yellow card) 83'	Report	Rose 80'	Stadium: The Lamex Stadium; Attendance: 3,220; Referee: Neil Hair

19 October 2019 14	Grimsby Town	0–4	Leyton Orient	Cleethorpes
15:00 BST	Hendrie (yellow card) 25'; Hewitt (yellow card) 56'	Report	Happe 11'; Coulson 21'; Harrold (yellow card) 28'; Ekpiteta (yellow card) 37'; Dayton (yellow card) 37'; Alabi 80'; Wright 85' (pen.)	Stadium: Blundell Park; Attendance: 4,132; Referee: Nick Kinseley

22 October 2019 15	Cambridge United	0–0	Grimsby Town	Cambridge
19:45 BST	Smith (penalty missed) 37'	Report	Whitehouse (yellow card) 24'	Stadium: Abbey Stadium; Attendance: 4,898; Referee: James Adcock

26 October 2019	Grimsby Town	v	Cheltenham Town	Cleethorpes
15:00 BST		Report		Stadium: Blundell Park
Note: Fixture was postponed due to a waterlogged pitch.

2 November 2019	Plymouth Argyle	v	Grimsby Town	Plymouth
15:00 GMT		Report		Stadium: Home Park
Note: Fixture was postponed due to structural damage to the roof of Home Park.

16 November 2019	Grimsby Town	v	Newport County	Cleethorpes
15:00 GMT		Report		Stadium: Blundell Park
Note: On 8 November, the match was postponed due to international call ups.

23 November 2019 16	Northampton Town	2–0	Grimsby Town	Northampton
15:00 GMT	Wharton 25'; Oliver 41' (yellow card) 60'	Report	McKeown (yellow card) 42'; Green (yellow card) 52'; Clifton (yellow card) 81'; Rose (yellow card) 90+1'	Stadium: PTS Academy Stadium; Attendance: 5,211; Referee: Andy Haines

26 November 2019 17	Grimsby Town	0–0	Cheltenham Town	Cleethorpes
19:45 GMT	Whitehouse (yellow card) 37'; Davis (yellow card) 72'	Report		Stadium: Blundell Park; Attendance: 2,508; Referee: Christopher Pollard

7 December 2019 18	Grimsby Town	0–3	Swindon Town	Cleethorpes
15:00 GMT	Hewitt (yellow card) 76'	Report	Doyle 10'; Yates 24', 52'	Stadium: Blundell Park; Attendance: 3,723; Referee: Peter Wright

14 December 2019 19	Carlisle United	0–0	Grimsby Town	Carlisle
15:00 GMT		Report	Robson (yellow card) 10'; Green (yellow card) 66'; Gibson (yellow card) 75'; Wright (yellow card) 80'	Stadium: Brunton Park; Attendance: 3,653; Referee: Marc Edwards

21 December 2019 20	Grimsby Town	0–1	Scunthorpe United	Cleethorpes
13:00 GMT	Clifton (yellow card) 36'; Wright (yellow card) 82'	Report	Brown (yellow card) 26'; McGahey (yellow card) 32' van Veen 62' (yellow card) 62'; Ntlhe (yellow card) 73'; Ward (yellow card) 76'	Stadium: Blundell Park; Attendance: 7,385; Referee: Tom Nield

26 December 2019 21	Macclesfield Town	1–1	Grimsby Town	Macclesfield
15:00 GMT	Fitzpatrick (yellow card) 38'; Ironside 49' (pen.); Horsfall (yellow card) 75'; Harris (yellow card) 86'	Report	Hendrie (yellow card) 45+1'; Wright (yellow card) 54'; Vernam 59'; Davis (yellow card) 83'	Stadium: Moss Rose; Attendance: 1,991; Referee: Paul Marsden

29 December 2019 22	Grimsby Town	1–1	Crawley Town	Cleethorpes
15:00 GMT	Hessenthaler 2'; Gibson (yellow card) 25'; Hendrie (yellow card) 59'; Clifton (yellow card) 62'	Report	Nadesan 37'; Lubala (yellow card) 43'; McNerney (yellow card) 90+3'	Stadium: Blundell Park; Attendance: 3,612; Referee: Oliver Yates

1 January 2020 23	Grimsby Town	1–0	Salford City	Cleethorpes
15:00 GMT	Rose 83'	Report	Towell (yellow card) 60'	Stadium: Blundell Park; Attendance: 4,555; Referee: Martin Coy

4 January 2020 24	Mansfield Town	0–1	Grimsby Town	Mansfield
15:00 GMT	White (yellow card) 31'; Pearce (yellow card) 45+3'; Davies (yellow card) 90+1'	Report	Waterfall (red card) 10'; Benning 66' (o.g.); McKeown (yellow card) 67'; Gibson (yellow card) 77'	Stadium: One Call Stadium; Attendance: 5,848; Referee: James Oldham

11 January 2020 25	Leyton Orient	1–1	Grimsby Town	Leyton
15:00 GMT	Kyprianou (yellow card) 51'; Angol (yellow card) 60' (goal) 90+2' (pen.); Brophy (yellow card) 90+6'	Report	Hessenthaler (yellow card) 30'; Clarke 74'; Hendrie (yellow card) 83'; McKeown (yellow card) 87'	Stadium: The Breyer Group Stadium; Attendance: 6,248; Referee: Will Finnie

18 January 2020 26	Grimsby Town	0–1	Exeter City	Cleethorpes
15:00 GMT	Vernam (yellow card) 44'	Report	Bowman (yellow card) 32'; Law 67'	Stadium: Blundell Park; Attendance: 6,021; Referee: Andy Haines

25 January 2020 27	Crawley Town	3–2	Grimsby Town	Crawley
15:00 GMT	Palmer 16', 70'; Nadesan (yellow card) 58' (goal) 77'; Doherty (yellow card) 85'	Report	Whitehouse 21'; Hanson 32'	Stadium: Broadfield Stadium; Attendance: 2,480; Referee: Nick Kinseley

28 January 2020 28	Grimsby Town	3–1	Stevenage	Cleethorpes
19:45 GMT	Nugent 17' (o.g.); Clarke 63' (pen.) (yellow card) 64'; Vernam 72'; Hendrie (yellow card) 78'	Report	Lakin (yellow card) 79' (goal) 90+2'; Nugent (yellow card) 87'	Stadium: Blundell Park; Attendance: 4,175; Referee: Tom Nield

1 February 2020 29	Grimsby Town	2–2	Forest Green Rovers	Cleethorpes
15:00 GMT	Vernam 19'; Clifton (yellow card) 35'; Glennon 53'; Hendrie (yellow card) 90+1'	Report	Bailey 32'; Kitching (yellow card) 44'; Aitchison 50'; Winchester (yellow card) 55'	Stadium: Blundell Park; Attendance: 4,675; Referee: Paul Marsden

8 February 2020 30	Bradford City	1–1	Grimsby Town	Bradford
15:00 GMT	Reeves (yellow card) 77'; Novak 80'	Report	Clarke (yellow card) 70'; Hendrie 90+1'	Stadium: The Utilita Energy Stadium; Attendance: 17,668; Referee: Steve Martin

11 February 2020 31	Colchester United	2–3	Grimsby Town	Colchester
19:45 GMT	Prosser 17' (yellow card) 67'; Robinson 42'; Stevenson (yellow card) 79'; Bramall (yellow card) 90+1'	Report	Vernam 21', 66', 69'; Green (yellow card) 50'; Benson (yellow card) 88'	Stadium: JobServe Community Stadium; Attendance: 2,954; Referee: Will Finnie

15 February 2020 32	Grimsby Town	2–1	Morecambe	Cleethorpes
15:00 GMT	Hanson 69'; Benson 86'	Report	Phillips 90+2'	Stadium: Blundell Park; Attendance: 4,704; Referee: Trevor Kettle

22 February 2020 33	Swindon Town	3–1	Grimsby Town	Swindon
15:00 GMT	Grant (yellow card) 3'; Yates 46'; Jaiyesimi 49'; Hendrie 57' (o.g.)	Report	Hanson 59'; Clarke (yellow card) 66'; Glennon (yellow card) 70'	Stadium: County Ground; Attendance: 8,180; Referee: Sam Purkiss

25 February 2020 34	Grimsby Town	4–2	Newport County	Cleethorpes
19:45 GMT	Garmston 1'; Hanson (yellow card) 29' (goal) 61'; Benson 40'; Wright 84'	Report	Green 10'; Inniss (yellow card) 39'; Amond 68'; Labadie (yellow card) 73'	Stadium: Blundell Park; Attendance: 3,578; Referee: Sebastian Stockbridge

29 February 2020 35	Grimsby Town	0–3	Northampton Town	Cleethorpes
15:00 GMT	Öhman (yellow card) 20'	Report	Goode 9'; Morton 26', 82'	Stadium: Blundell Park; Attendance: 4,879; Referee: Christopher Pollard

3 March 2020 36	Plymouth Argyle	3–0	Grimsby Town	Plymouth
19:45 GMT	Bakinson 22'; Hardie 30'; Jephcott 40'; Grant (yellow card) 65'	Report	Clifton (yellow card) 57'	Stadium: Home Park; Attendance: 9,327; Referee: David Rock

7 March 2020 37	Scunthorpe United	0–2	Grimsby Town	Scunthorpe
13:00 GMT	Bedeau (yellow card) 65'; Sutton (red card) 81'; Gilliead (yellow card) 86'; Perch (yellow card) 90+2'	Report	Glennon (yellow card) 20'; Waterfall (yellow card) 22' (goal) 61'; Vernam 52'; Hewitt (yellow card) 89'	Stadium: Sands Venue Stadium; Attendance: 6,855; Referee: Anthony Backhouse

14 March 2020	Grimsby Town	v	Carlisle United	Cleethorpes
15:00 GMT				Stadium: Blundell Park
Note: Season was suspended until 3 April 2020, due to the COVID-19 pandemic.

17 March 2020	Grimsby Town	v	Cambridge United	Cleethorpes
19:45 GMT				Stadium: Blundell Park
Note: Season was suspended until 3 April 2020, due to the COVID-19 pandemic.

21 March 2020	Cheltenham Town	v	Grimsby Town	Cheltenham
15:00 GMT				Stadium: Jonny-Rocks Stadium
Note: Season was suspended until 3 April 2020, due to the COVID-19 pandemic.

28 March 2020	Grimsby Town	v	Plymouth Argyle	Cleethorpes
15:00 GMT				Stadium: Blundell Park
Note: Season was suspended until 3 April 2020, due to the COVID-19 pandemic.

4 April 2020	Newport County	v	Grimsby Town	Newport
15:00 BST				Stadium: Rodney Parade
Note: On 3 April, the English Football League decided to postpone all football until safe to do so due to the COVID-19 pandemic.

10 April 2020	Port Vale	v	Grimsby Town	Burslem
15:00 BST				Stadium: Vale Park
Note: On 3 April, the English Football League decided to postpone all football until safe to do so due to the COVID-19 pandemic.

13 April 2020	Grimsby Town	v	Walsall	Cleethorpes
13:00 BST				Stadium: Blundell Park
Note: On 3 April, the English Football League decided to postpone all football until safe to do so due to the COVID-19 pandemic.

18 April 2020	Crewe Alexandra	v	Grimsby Town	Crewe
15:00 BST				Stadium: Alexandra Stadium
Note: On 3 April, the English Football League decided to postpone all football until safe to do so due to the COVID-19 pandemic.

25 April 2020	Grimsby Town	v	Oldham Athletic	Cleethorpes
15:00 BST				Stadium: Blundell Park
Note: On 3 April, the English Football League decided to postpone all football until safe to do so due to the COVID-19 pandemic.

=== FA Cup ===
The first round draw was made on 21 October 2019.

9 November 2019 First round	Grimsby Town	1–1	Newport County	Cleethorpes
15:00 GMT	Öhman (yellow card) 20'; Green (yellow card) 27'; Waterfall 43'; Robson (yellow card) 90+5'	Report	Amond 80' (pen.)	Stadium: Blundell Park; Attendance: 2,086; Referee: Leigh Doughty

20 November 2019 First round replay	Newport County	2–0	Grimsby Town	Newport
19:45 GMT	Abrahams (yellow card) 47'; Amond 50'; Sheehan (yellow card) 85'; Labadie 90+2'	Report	Rose (yellow card) 52'; Pollock (yellow card) 80' (yellow-red card) 90+1'	Stadium: Rodney Parade; Attendance: 2,053; Referee: Darren Handley

=== EFL Cup ===
The first round draw was made on 20 June. The second round draw was made on 13 August 2019 following the conclusion of all but one first-round matches. The third round draw was confirmed on 28 August 2019, live on Sky Sports.

13 August 2019 First round	Grimsby Town	1–0	Doncaster Rovers	Cleethorpes
19:45 BST	Cook 40'	Report	Taylor (yellow card) 78'	Stadium: Blundell Park; Attendance: 2,470; Referee: John Brooks

27 August 2019 Second round	Grimsby Town	A–A	Macclesfield Town	Cleethorpes
19:45 BST	Wright (yellow card) 14'; Cook (yellow card) 35'	Report	Cameron (yellow card) 34'	Stadium: Blundell Park; Referee: Darren Drysdale
Note: Match was abandoned at half-time due to a waterlogged pitch.

11 September 2019 Second round	Grimsby Town	0–0 (5–4 p)	Macclesfield Town	Cleethorpes
19:45 BST	Whitehouse (yellow card) 16'; Hessenthaler (yellow card) 56'; Gibson (yellow card) 90'	Report		Stadium: Blundell Park; Attendance: 3,011; Referee: Darren Drysdale
	Penalties
	Green (penalty missed); Hanson (penalty scored); Cardwell (penalty scored); Ogbu (penalty scored); Hessenthaler (penalty scored); Whitehouse (penalty scored)		Ironside (penalty scored); Horsfall (penalty missed); Archibald (penalty scored); Gnahoua (penalty scored); Evans (penalty scored); Kirby (penalty missed)

25 September 2019 Third round	Chelsea	7–1	Grimsby Town	Fulham
19:45 BST	Barkley 4'; Batshuayi 7', 86'; Pedro 43' (pen.); Zouma 56'; James 82'; Hudson-Odoi 89'	Report	Green 19' (yellow card) 28'	Stadium: Stamford Bridge; Attendance: 39,674; Referee: Keith Stroud

=== EFL Trophy ===
On 9 July 2019, the pre-determined group stage draw was announced with Invited clubs to be drawn on 12 July 2019.

Pos	Div	Team	Pld	W	PW	PL	L	GF	GA	GD	Pts	Qualification
1	ACA	Leicester City U21	3	2	1	0	0	5	3	+2	8	Advance to Round 2
2	L2	Scunthorpe United	3	2	0	1	0	6	2	+4	7	Advance to Round 2
3	L1	Sunderland	3	1	0	0	2	4	7	−3	3	
4	L2	Grimsby Town	3	0	0	0	3	4	7	−3	0	

Source: EFL.com

3 September 2019 Group stage	Grimsby Town	1–2	Scunthorpe United	Cleethorpes
19:45 BST	Pollock (yellow card) 32'; Cardwell 49'	Report	van Veen 28', 75'; Colclough (yellow card) 69'; Perch (red card) 90+2'	Stadium: Blundell Park; Attendance: 1,302; Referee: Andy Haines

8 October 2019 Group stage	Sunderland	3–2	Grimsby Town	Sunderland
19:45 BST	Watmore 68'; Dobson (yellow card) 70'; McNulty 79'; Grigg 86'	Report	Green 59'; Ogbu 81'	Stadium: Stadium of Light; Attendance: 6,952; Referee: Steve Martin

29 October 2019 Group stage	Grimsby Town	1–2	Leicester City U21	Cleethorpes
19:45 GMT	Ogbu 31'; Cardwell (yellow card) 50'; Gibson (yellow card) 59'; Clifton (yellow card) 80'	Report	Eppiah 68', 90'	Stadium: Blundell Park; Attendance: 341; Referee: Sebastian Stockbridge
