= 2018–19 Grimsby Town F.C. season =

Grimsby Town F.C.
2018–19 season
- Chairman: John Fenty
- Manager: Michael Jolley
- Stadium: Blundell Park
- League Two: 17th
- FA Cup: Third round
- EFL Cup: First round (vs. Rochdale)
Home colours	Away colours	Third colours

The 2018–19 season is Grimsby Town's 141st season of existence and their third consecutive season in League Two. Along with competing in League Two, the club will also participate in the FA Cup, EFL Cup and EFL Trophy.

The season covers the period from 1 July 2018 to 30 June 2019.

== Competitions ==
=== Friendlies ===
The club have confirmed the first four pre-season friendlies will be against Cleethorpes Town, Sunderland, York City and Doncaster Rovers.

The annual pre-season fixture versus Cleethorpes Town will take place at the new home ground of their opponents, The Linden Club, on Saturday 7 July.

The Mariners will then play host to EFL League One side Sunderland on Tuesday 17 July before travelling to York City on Saturday 21 July. Town will then host Doncaster Rovers at Blundell Park on Tuesday 24 July.

7 July 2018	Cleethorpes Town	4-3	Grimsby Town	Grimsby
15:00 BST				Stadium: Linden Club

24 July 2018 Friendly	Grimsby Town	1–0	Doncaster Rovers	Cleethorpes
19:30 BST	Hall-Johnson 23'	Report		Stadium: Blundell Park; Attendance: 1,397

27 July 2018 Friendly	Gainsborough Trinity	0–4	Grimsby Town	Gainsborough
13:00 BST		Report	Hooper 28'; Clifton 36'; Hessenthaler 68'; Robles 82'	Stadium: Gainsborough Martin & Co. Arena

=== League Two ===
==== League table ====
Pos	Team	Pld	W	D	L	GF	GA	GD	Pts
15	Northampton Town	46	14	19	13	64	63	+1	61
16	Cheltenham Town	46	15	12	19	57	68	−11	57
17	Grimsby Town	46	16	8	22	45	56	−11	56
18	Morecambe	46	14	12	20	54	70	−16	54
19	Crawley Town	46	15	8	23	51	68	−17	53

Source: EFL Official Website
Rules for classification: 1) Points; 2) Goal difference; 3) Number of goals scored; 4) Head-to-head results

==== Results summary ====
Overall								Home						Away					
Pld	W	D	L	GF	GA	GD	Pts	W	D	L	GF	GA	GD	W	D	L	GF	GA	GD
46	16	8	22	45	56	−11	56	11	4	9	26	22	+4	5	4	13	19	34	−15

Last updated: 4 May 2019.
Source: BBC

==== Results by matchday ====
Matchday	1	2	3	4	5	6	7	8	9	10	11	12	13	14	15	16	17	18	19	20	21	22	23	24	25	26	27	28	29	30	31	32	33	34	35	36	37	38	39	40	41	42	43	44	45	46
Ground	H	A	H	A	A	H	A	H	A	H	A	H	H	H	A	A	A	H	A	H	A	H	H	A	A	H	H	A	A	H	H	A	H	A	H	A	A	H	H	A	H	A	A	H	A	H
Result	L	W	D	D	L	L	L	L	L	L	W	W	D	W	L	L	L	W	D	W	L	W	W	W	W	L	L	L	L	W	W	W	W	D	L	L	L	D	D	L	L	D	L	W	L	W
Position	21	12	16	15	17	20	21	21	22	23	22	19	20	19	19	21	21	20	20	18	18	18	16	14	13	14	14	15	15	15	12	11	12	11	14	15	16	16	15	17	17	17	17	17	17	17

Updated to match(es) played on 4 May 2019. Source: Statto.com
A = Away; H = Home; W = Win; D = Draw; L = Loss

==== Matches ====
On 21 June 2018, the League Two fixtures for the forthcoming season were announced.

4 August 2018 1	Grimsby Town	1–4	Forest Green Rovers	Cleethorpes
15:00 BST	Rose 31' (pen.)	Report	Winchester 51'; Collins 67' (o.g.); Doidge 70' 83'	Stadium: Blundell Park; Attendance: 5,879; Referee: Martin Coy

11 August 2018 2	Macclesfield Town	0–2	Grimsby Town	Macclesfield
15:00 BST		Report	Cook 29'; Rose (red card) 63'; Vernam 90'	Stadium: Moss Rose; Attendance: 2,589; Referee: Oliver Langford

18 August 2018 3	Grimsby Town	1–1	Lincoln City	Cleethorpes
13:00 BST	Woolford 33'	Report	Akinde 71' (pen.)	Stadium: Blundell Park; Attendance: 7,201; Referee: Carl Boyeson

21 August 2018 4	Milton Keynes Dons	1–1	Grimsby Town	Denbigh
19:45 BST	Simpson 46'	Report	Cook 35' [[Paul Dixon|Dixon]] (red card) 82'	Stadium: Stadium mk Attendance: 6800; Referee: P Wright

25 August 2018 5	Newport County	1–0	Grimsby Town	Newport
15:00 BST	Dolan 40'	Report	Thomas (red card) 90+2'	Stadium: Rodney Parade; Attendance: 3,288; Referee: Neil Hair

1 September 2018 6	Grimsby Town	0–1	Yeovil Town	Cleethorpes
15:00 BST		Report	Patrick 78'	Stadium: Blundell Park; Attendance: 4,284; Referee: Thomas Bramall

8 September 2018 7	Bury	4–0	Grimsby Town	Bury
15:00 BST	Mayor 14', 70'; Aimson 34'; Dagnall 63'	Report		Stadium: Gigg Lane; Attendance: 3,677; Referee: Anthony Backhouse

15 September 2018 8	Grimsby Town	0–3	Oldham Athletic	Cleethorpes
15:00 BST		Report	Surridge 63', 65'; Baxter 90+2'	Stadium: Blundell Park; Attendance: 4,746; Referee: Nick Kinseley

22 September 2018 9	Stevenage	1–0	Grimsby Town	Stevenage
15:00 BST	Seddon 83'	Report		Stadium: Broadhall Way; Attendance: 2,332; Referee: Lee Collins

29 September 2018 10	Grimsby Town	1–2	Morecambe	Cleethorpes
15:00 BST	Embleton 9'	Report	Oates 61'; Mandeville 65'	Stadium: Blundell Park; Attendance: 3,972; Referee: Chris Sarginson

2 October 2018 11	Carlisle United	0–1	Grimsby Town	Carlisle
19:45 BST		Report	Hendrie 38'	Stadium: Brunton Park; Attendance: 3,316; Referee: Martin Coy

6 October 2018 12	Grimsby Town	2–0	Port Vale	Cleethorpes
15:00 BST	Thomas 1'; Hooper 53'; Whitmore (yellow card) 71'	Report	Kay (yellow card) 85'	Stadium: Blundell Park; Attendance: 3,842; Referee: Andy Haines

20 October 2018 13	Grimsby Town	0–0	Exeter City	Cleethorpes
15:00 BST		Report		Stadium: Blundell Park; Attendance: 4,038; Referee: Matt Donohue

23 October 2018 14	Grimsby Town	1–0	Colchester United	Cleethorpes
19:45 BST	Thomas 65'	Report		Stadium: Blundell Park; Attendance: 3,662; Referee: Graham Salisbury

27 October 2018 15	Crewe Alexandra	2–0	Grimsby Town	Crewe
15:00 BST	Whelan 70'; Miller 77'	Report		Stadium: Gresty Road; Attendance: 3,725; Referee: Peter Wright

3 November 2018 16	Cambridge United	1–0	Grimsby Town	Cambridge
15:00 GMT	Lewis 83'	Report	Hall-Johnson (yellow card) 76'; Embleton (yellow card) 89'	Stadium: Abbey Stadium; Attendance: 4,096; Referee: Nick Kinseley

6 November 2018 17	Mansfield Town	2–1	Grimsby Town	Mansfield
19:45 GMT	Walker 50', 82'	Report	Benning 36' (o.g.)	Stadium: Field Mill; Attendance: 4,118; Referee: Keith Stroud

17 November 2018 18	Grimsby Town	1–0	Crawley Town	Cleethorpes
15:00 GMT	Rose 86'	Report		Stadium: Blundell Park; Attendance: 4,459; Referee: Andy Haines

24 November 2018 19	Northampton Town	2–2	Grimsby Town	Northampton
15:00 GMT	Williams 4' van Veen 74'	Report	Vernam 36'; Cardwell 80'; Collins (red card) 86'	Stadium: Sixfields Stadium; Attendance: 5,594; Referee: Trevor Kettle

27 November 2018 20	Grimsby Town	5–2	Tranmere Rovers	Cleethorpes
19:45 GMT	Clifton 33'; Thomas 40'; Davis 48'; Rose 82' (pen.); Embleton 90'	Report	Norwood 11'; Mullin 65'	Stadium: Blundell Park; Attendance: 3,293; Referee: Darren Drysdale

8 December 2018 21	Cheltenham Town	2–1	Grimsby Town	Cheltenham
15:00 GMT	Broom 29'; Thomas 90+2' (pen.)	Report	Embleton 63'	Stadium: Whaddon Road; Attendance: 2,775; Referee: Paul Marsden

15 December 2018 22	Grimsby Town	2–1	Swindon Town	Cleethorpes
15:00 GMT	Thomas 26' (pen.), 61'	Report	Taylor 28'	Stadium: Blundell Park; Attendance: 3,809; Referee: Scott Oldham

22 December 2018 23	Grimsby Town	4–0	Notts County	Cleethorpes
15:00 GMT	Clifton 4'; Davis 37', 66'; Rose (yellow card) 69'; Thomas (yellow card) 75' (goal) 88'	Report	Hewitt (yellow card) 75'	Stadium: Blundell Park; Attendance: 4,946; Referee: David Webb

26 December 2018 24	Port Vale	0–1	Grimsby Town	Burslem
15:00 GMT	Kay (yellow card) 24'	Report	Thomas 62'	Stadium: Vale Park; Attendance: 5,129; Referee: Ben Toner

29 December 2018 25	Exeter City	1–2	Grimsby Town	Exeter
15:00 GMT	Stockley 78'	Report	Woolford (yellow card) 9' (goal) 14'; Whitmore (red card) 51'; Hendrie (yellow card) 73'; Rose 80' (pen.)	Stadium: St James Park; Attendance: 4,956; Referee: Chris Sarginson

1 January 2019 26	Grimsby Town	0–1	Mansfield Town	Cleethorpes
13:00 GMT	Rose (yellow card) 60'	Report	Bishop 21'; Sweeney (yellow card) 68'	Stadium: Blundell Park; Attendance: 5,931; Referee: Matt Donohue

12 January 2019 27	Grimsby Town	0–2	Macclesfield Town	Cleethorpes
15:00 GMT	Ring (yellow card) 83'	Report	Arthur (yellow card) 5'; Marsh 26'; Wilson 33' (yellow card) 53'	Stadium: Blundell Park; Attendance: 4,694; Referee: Seb Stockbridge

19 January 2019 28	Lincoln City	1–0	Grimsby Town	Lincoln
13:00 GMT	O'Connor (yellow card) 5'; Toffolo 12' (yellow card) 42'; Akinde (yellow card) 45+1'	Report	Thomas (yellow card) 14'; Hessenthaler (yellow card) 39'; Whitmore (yellow card) 50'; Davis (yellow card) 71'; McKeown (red card) 76'; Öhman (yellow card) 84'	Stadium: Sincil Bank; Attendance: 9,650; Referee: Mike Dean

22 January 2019 29	Forest Green Rovers	3–0	Grimsby Town	Nailsworth
19:45 GMT	Doidge 29', 45+1'; Brown 50'	Report	Öhman (yellow card) 49'; Rose (yellow card) 64'	Stadium: The New Lawn; Attendance: 1,810; Referee: Antony Coggins

26 January 2019 30	Grimsby Town	1–0	Milton Keynes Dons	Cleethorpes
15:00 GMT	Öhman (yellow card) 25'; Thomas 27'; Davis (red card) 41'; Whitmore (yellow card) 64'	Report	Gilbey (yellow card) 45+2'; Cargill (yellow card) 61'	Stadium: Blundell Park; Attendance: 3,862; Referee: Paul Marsden

2 February 2019 31	Grimsby Town	3–0	Newport County	Cleethorpes
15:00 GMT	Cook 17', 56'; Thomas (penalty missed) 45+1'; Demetriou 84' (o.g.)	Report	Pipe (yellow card) 76'	Stadium: Blundell Park; Attendance: 3,712; Referee: Anthony Backhouse

9 February 2019 32	Yeovil Town	1–3	Grimsby Town	Yeovil
15:00 GMT	Alcock (yellow card) 5' (yellow-red card) 65'; Fisher 90'	Report	Thomas 9'; Gafaiti 35' (o.g.); Hessenthaler (yellow card) 74'; Hendrie (yellow card) 77'; Dennis 87'; Embleton (yellow card) 90+2'	Stadium: Huish Park; Attendance: 2,692; Referee: Charles Breakspear

16 February 2019 33	Grimsby Town	1–0	Cheltenham Town	Cleethorpes
15:00 GMT	Thomas 41' (pen.)	Report	Raglan (yellow card) 44'; Tillson (yellow card) 80'	Stadium: Blundell Park; Attendance: 4,940; Referee: Trevor Kettle

23 February 2019 34	Swindon Town	1–1	Grimsby Town	Swindon
15:00 GMT	Robinson 74'	Report	Öhman (yellow card) 20' (yellow-red card) 66'; Thomas (yellow card) 50'; Hendrie 76'; Dennis (yellow card) 90+5'	Stadium: County Ground; Attendance: 6,434; Referee: Neil Hair

2 March 2019 35	Grimsby Town	0–2	Cambridge United	Cleethorpes
15:00 GMT		Report	Taft 42'; Deegan (yellow card) 61'; Hepburn-Murphy (yellow card) 72' (goal) 82'	Stadium: Blundell Park; Attendance: 4,772; Referee: Scott Oldham

9 March 2019 36	Crawley Town	2–1	Grimsby Town	Crawley
15:00 GMT	Palmer (yellow card) 21' (goal) 26', 40'	Report	Thomas 6'; Woolford (yellow card) 15'; Embleton (yellow card) 70'; Öhman (yellow card) 79'	Stadium: Broadfield Stadium; Attendance: 2,043; Referee: Brett Huxtable

12 March 2019 37	Tranmere Rovers	4–1	Grimsby Town	Birkenhead
19:45 GMT	Jennings 18', 44'; Monthé 34'; Norwood 39'; Davies (yellow card) 80'	Report	Thomas (penalty missed) 32'; Woolford 33'	Stadium: Prenton Park; Attendance: 5,269; Referee: Graham Salisbury

16 March 2019 38	Grimsby Town	0–0	Northampton Town	Cleethorpes
15:00 GMT	Hessenthaler (yellow card) 51'	Report	Hoskins (yellow card) 8'; Buchanan (yellow card) 45+2'	Stadium: Blundell Park; Attendance: 3,890; Referee: Oliver Yates

23 March 2019 39	Grimsby Town	0–0	Bury	Cleethorpes
15:00 GMT	Hendrie (yellow card) 65'; Davis (yellow card) 72'	Report	Wharton (yellow card) 84'	Stadium: Blundell Park; Attendance: 4,375; Referee: Anthony Backhouse

30 March 2019 40	Oldham Athletic	2–0	Grimsby Town	Oldham
15:00 GMT	O'Grady 42'; Lang 77' (yellow card) 90+1'	Report	Hessenthaler (yellow card) 63'; Davis (yellow card) 83'	Stadium: Boundary Park; Attendance: 3,998; Referee: James Adcock

6 April 2019 41	Grimsby Town	0–2	Stevenage	Cleethorpes
15:00 BST	Clifton (yellow card) 54'	Report	Guthrie 23', 50'; Martin (yellow card) 45+2'	Stadium: Blundell Park; Attendance: 3,689; Referee: Trevor Kettle

13 April 2019 42	Morecambe	1–1	Grimsby Town	Morecambe
15:00 BST	Collins 80' (pen.)	Report	Vernam 88'	Stadium: Globe Arena; Attendance: 1,897; Referee: Scott Oldham

19 April 2019 43	Colchester United	1–0	Grimsby Town	Colchester
15:00 BST	Nouble 25'; Lapslie (yellow card) 77'; Jackson (yellow card) 80'	Report	Hall-Johnson (yellow card) 36'; Dennis (yellow card) 42'; Clifton (yellow card) 66'; Collins (yellow card) 90+3' (yellow-red card) 90+5'	Stadium: Colchester Community Stadium; Attendance: 3,677; Referee: Christopher Sarginson

22 April 2019 44	Grimsby Town	1–0	Carlisle United	Cleethorpes
15:00 BST	Clifton (yellow card) 64'; Grayson 90'	Report	Thomas (yellow card) 54'; Jones (yellow card) 60'	Stadium: Blundell Park; Attendance: 3,647; Referee: Paul Marsden

27 April 2019 45	Notts County	2–1	Grimsby Town	Nottingham
15:00 BST	Stubbs (yellow card) 48'; Mackail-Smith 48'; Rose (yellow card) 55'; Clifton 67' (o.g.)	Report	Hall-Johnson (yellow card) 50'; Whitmore 90+3'	Stadium: Meadow Lane; Attendance: 8,519; Referee: Andy Haines

4 May 2019 46	Grimsby Town	2–0	Crewe Alexandra	Cleethorpes
12:30 BST	Davis 26'; Grayson 34'; Wright (yellow card) 62'	Report	Sass-Davies (yellow card) 12'; Ng (yellow card) 19'	Stadium: Blundell Park; Attendance: 4,248; Referee: Craig Hicks

=== FA Cup ===
The first round draw was made live on BBC by Dennis Wise and Dion Dublin on 22 October. The draw for the second round was made live on BBC and BT by Mark Schwarzer and Glenn Murray on 12 November. The third round draw was made live on BBC by Ruud Gullit and Paul Ince from Stamford Bridge on 3 December 2018.

10 November 2018 First round	Grimsby Town	3–1	Milton Keynes Dons	Cleethorpes
15:00 GMT	Embleton 50'; Thomas 61'; Vernam 73'	Report	Agard 23'	Stadium: Blundell Park; Attendance: 1,991; Referee: Carl Boyeson

2 December 2018 Second round	Chesterfield	0–2	Grimsby Town	Chesterfield
14:00 GMT		Report	Vernam 37'; Clifton 70'	Stadium: Proact Stadium; Attendance: 4,537; Referee: Michael Salisbury

5 January 2019 Third round	Crystal Palace	1–0	Grimsby Town	Selhurst
17:30 GMT	Ayew 86'	Report	Fox (red card) 2'; Hendrie (yellow card) 45+1'; Rose (yellow card) 74'	Stadium: Selhurst Park; Attendance: 19,967; Referee: Martin Atkinson

=== EFL Cup ===
On 15 June 2018, the draw for the first round was made in Vietnam.

14 August 2018 First round	Grimsby Town	0–2	Rochdale	Cleethorpes
19:45 BST		Report	Rathbone 39', 79'	Stadium: Blundell Park; Attendance: 1,781; Referee: Darren England

=== EFL Trophy ===
On 13 July 2018, the initial group stage draw bar the U21 invited clubs was announced. It was later announced that Northern Group G would include Newcastle United U21.

Pos	Lge	Team	Pld	W	PW	PL	L	GF	GA	GD	Pts	Qualification
1	ACA	Newcastle United U21	3	3	0	0	0	8	3	+5	9	Round 2
2	L2	Notts County	3	1	0	0	2	5	6	−1	3	Round 2
3	L1	Doncaster Rovers	3	1	0	0	2	5	7	−2	3	
4	L2	Grimsby Town	3	1	0	0	2	4	6	−2	3	

Source: EFL.com

4 September 2018 Group stages	Grimsby Town	2–1	Notts County	Cleethorpes
19:45 BST	Rose 69' (pen.); Hessenthaler 88'	Report	Alessandra 12'	Stadium: Blundell Park; Attendance: 746

9 October 2018 Group stages	Doncaster Rovers	2–0	Grimsby Town	Doncaster
19:30 BST	May 23', 57' (pen.)	Report		Stadium: Keepmoat Stadium; Attendance: 1,420

13 November 2018 Group stages	Grimsby Town	2–3	Newcastle United U21	Cleethorpes
19:45 GMT	Hooper 9'; Cook 54'	Report	Roberts 19'; Sorensen 26'; Longstaff 78'	Stadium: Blundell Park; Attendance: 547

== Top scorers ==
As of September 5, 2018

Rnk	Pos	No.	Player	League Two	FA Cup	EFL Cup	EFL Trophy	Total
1	FW	39	(England) Wes Thomas	10	1	0	0	11
2	FW	11	(England) Jordan Cook	4	0	0	1	5
3	FW	18	(England) Charles Vernam	2	2	0	0	4
3	MF	8	(England) Mitch Rose	3	0	0	1	4
3	MF	22	(England) Elliot Embleton	3	1	0	0	4
6	MF	15	(England) Harry Clifton	2	1	0	0	3
6	CB	24	(England) Harry Davis	3	0	0	0	3
8	MF	26	(England) Martyn Woolford	2	0	0	0	2
8	FW	99	(England) JJ Hooper	1	0	0	1	2
10	MF	7	(England) Jake Hessenthaler	0	0	0	1	1
10	RB	27	(England) Luke Hendrie	1	0	0	0	1
10	FW	21	(Jamaica) Ahkeem Rose	1	0	0	0	1
10	FW	17	(Scotland) Harry Cardwell	1	0	0	0	1
10	FW	8	(England) Kristian Dennis	1	0	0	0	1
Own Goals				2	0	0	0	2
Total				36	5	0	4	45

== Transfers ==
=== Transfers in ===
Date from	Position	Nationality	Name	From	Fee	Ref.
1 July 2018	SS	(England)	Jordan Cook	(England) Luton Town	Free transfer	
1 July 2018	CB	(England)	Harry Davis	(Scotland) St. Mirren	Free transfer	
1 July 2018	CM	(England)	Jake Hessenthaler	(England) Gillingham	Free transfer	
1 July 2018	CF	(England)	Louis Robles	(Spain) San Roque de Lepe	Free transfer	
1 July 2018	CM	(England)	John Welsh	(England) Preston North End	Free transfer	
1 July 2018	CM	(England)	Elliott Whitehouse	(England) Lincoln City	Free transfer	
1 July 2018	CB	(England)	Alex Whitmore	(England) Chesterfield	Undisclosed	
9 July 2018	GK	(England)	Sam Russell	(England) Forest Green Rovers	Free transfer	
24 July 2018	AM	(England)	Charles Vernam	(England) Derby County	Undisclosed	
17 August 2018	CF	(England)	Wes Thomas	(England) Oxford United	Free transfer	
1 January 2019	LB	(Sweden)	Sebastian Ring	(Sweden) Örebro	Free transfer	
8 January 2019	CB	(Sweden)	Ludvig Öhman	(Sweden) Brommapojkarna	Undisclosed	
11 January 2019	RB	(England)	Luke Hendrie	(England) Shrewsbury Town	Undisclosed	

=== Transfers out ===
Date from	Position	Nationality	Name	To	Fee	Ref.
1 July 2018	CM	(Republic of Ireland)	James Berrett	(England) FC Halifax Town	Released	
1 July 2018	CB	(England)	Nathan Clarke	(England) FC Halifax Town	Released	
1 July 2018	CM	(England)	Chris Clements	(England) Cheltenham Town	Released	
1 July 2018	RW	(Scotland)	Siriki Dembélé	(England) Peterborough United	Undisclosed	
1 July 2018	RB	(England)	Ben Davies	(England) Boston United	Released	
1 July 2018	CB	(England)	Jack Keeble	(England) St Neots Town	Released	
1 July 2018	LM	(England)	Sam Kelly	(Scotland) Hamilton Academical	Free transfer	
1 July 2018	GK	(England)	Ben Killip	(England) Braintree Town	Released	
1 July 2018	CM	(England)	Sean McAllister	(England) Chester	Released	
1 July 2018	LW	(England)	Gary McSheffrey	(England) Frickley Athletic	Released	
1 July 2018	RB	(England)	Zak Mills	(England) Morecambe	Released	
1 July 2018	CB	(England)	Karleigh Osborne	(England) Aldershot Town	Released	
1 July 2018	CM	(England)	Tom Sawyer	(England) Skegness Town	Released	
1 July 2018	CF	(England)	Scott Vernon	(England) Cleethorpes Town	Released	
5 July 2018	CM	(England)	Luke Summerfield	(Wales) Wrexham	Free transfer	
8 August 2018	CB	(England)	Alexander McMillan	(Sweden) Ytterhogdal	Free transfer	
19 November 2018	LB	(Scotland)	Paul Dixon	(Scotland) Falkirk	Mutual consent	
28 December 2018	CF	(England)	Louis Robles	(Spain) San Roque de Lepe	Mutual consent	
29 January 2019	CM	(England)	Mitch Rose	(England) Notts County	Free transfer	
6 February 2019	LB	(England)	Andrew Fox	(United States) El Paso Locomotive	Free transfer	
20 March 2019	CM	(England)	John Welsh	(England) Atherton Collieries	Mutual consent	

=== Loans in ===
Start date	Position	Nationality	Name	From	End date	Ref.
6 July 2018	CB	(England)	Akin Famewo	(England) Luton Town	28 January 2019	
18 August 2018	RB	(England)	Luke Hendrie	(England) Shrewsbury Town	7 January 2019	
30 August 2018	CM	(England)	Elliot Embleton	(England) Sunderland	31 May 2019	
31 August 2018	LM	(England)	Ben Pringle	(England) Preston North End	21 January 2019	
18 January 2018	DM	(England)	Joe Grayson	(England) Blackburn Rovers	31 May 2019	
31 January 2019	CF	(England)	Kristian Dennis	(England) Notts County	31 May 2019	

=== Loans out ===
Start date	Position	Nationality	Name	To	End date	Ref.
6 September 2018	FW	(Jamaica)	Ahkeem Rose	(England) Boston United	6 October 2018	
6 September 2018	CM	(England)	Max Wright	(England) Boston United	26 April 2019	
5 December 2018	CF	(England)	JJ Hooper	(England) Bromley	30 April 2019	
