= Harry Cardwell =

Footballer (born 1996)

Personal information
- Full name: Harry James Cardwell
- Date of birth: 28 October 1996 (age 30)
- Place of birth: Beverley, England
- Height: 6 ft 3 in (1.91 m)
- Position: Centre-forward

Team information
- Current team: Southend United
- Number: 9

Youth career
- 2006–2013: Hull City
- 2013–2015: Reading

Senior career*
Years	Team	Apps	(Gls)
2015–2017	Reading	1	(1)
2015	→ Woking (loan)	5	(0)
2016	→ Braintree Town (loan)	4	(0)
2017	→ Brighton & Hove Albion (loan)	0	(0)
2017–2020	Grimsby Town	37	(1)
2020	→ Chorley (loan)	1	(1)
2020–2022	Chorley	24	(8)
2021	→ Stockport County (loan)	18	(5)
2022–2024	Southend United	81	(27)
2024–2026	Forest Green Rovers	42	(4)
2025–2026	→ Southend United (loan)	10	(2)
2026–	Southend United	9	(4)

International career^{‡}
2014–2015	Scotland U19	10	(2)
2014	Scotland U21	1	(0)
- * Club domestic league appearances and goals as of 20 September 2026 (UTC) ‡ National team caps and goals as of 4 March 2019

Harry James Cardwell (born 28 October 1996) is a professional footballer who plays as a centre-forward for National League club Southend United.

At the age of 10, Cardwell started his career with Hull City's youth system. At age 16, he moved to Reading for £75,000 in 2013, joining as part of their academy setup. Two one-month loan spells followed, at National League sides Woking in 2015 and Braintree Town in 2016. After being released by Reading, Cardwell went on trial with League Two side Grimsby Town and signed a contract in July 2017 before moves to Chorley and Southend. He is a former Scotland U21 international.

== Club career ==
Cardwell was born in Beverley, East Riding of Yorkshire and raised in the village of North Cave. He attended South Hunsley School in Melton, East Riding of Yorkshire and started his career with Hull City where he spent seven years in their youth system.

=== Reading ===
Cardwell signed for Reading in July 2013, joining their academy, a compensation fee of £75,000 agreed under the Elite Player Performance Plan (EPPP). Having finished joint top scorer for the under-18s, Cardwell signed professional terms with Reading in July 2014. In January 2017, he went on loan to Championship rivals Brighton & Hove Albion in their under-23s until the end of the season.

On 10 September 2015, Cardwell joined National League side Woking on a one-month youth loan deal, to strengthen their options up front after a serious injury to Scott Rendell.

Cardwell joined National League side Braintree Town in March 2016 on a one-month loan.

=== Grimsby Town ===
Cardwell joined up with League Two side Grimsby Town on 4 July 2017, to try and earn himself a contract. Having impressed in his trial, scoring four goals in pre season, Cardwell signed a two-year contract with the club on 17 July 2017 on a free transfer.

Cardwell made his professional debut with Grimsby on 5 August 2017; coming off the subs bench on 79 minutes in their 3–1 victory at Chesterfield, he latched on to a through ball by Luke Summerfield, but Cardwell was brought down as he was about to shoot for goal, winning his team an 85th minute penalty, which was put away by Ben Davies to finish Chesterfield off. He scored his first goal for Grimsby in an EFL Trophy tie against Doncaster Rovers on 29 August 2017.

=== Chorley ===
Following his release by Grimsby in June 2020, Cardwell joined National League North side, Chorley on a permanent deal, following an earlier loan spell at the club. In December 2020, Cardwell scored his first league goal following his permanent move, a 25-yard strike in a 1–0 win against Guiseley at Victory Park. Cardwell played his role in the club's impressive FA Cup run as they reached the Fourth round before being beaten 1–0 by Premier League side Wolverhampton Wanderers. He featured in all six matches in Chorley's run, scoring twice, against Gateshead in a 2–1 second qualifying round victory and in a 3–2 comeback victory at League One Wigan Athletic.

On 22 February 2021, Cardwell joined National League side Stockport County on loan for the remainder of the 2020–21 season, following the early conclusion to the National League North season. He scored his first goals for the club in his third appearance with the third in a 5–0 thrashing of Solihull Moors.

=== Southend United ===
On 20 January 2022, Cardwell joined National League side Southend United. He scored his first goal for the club - in his second appearance - in a game against Aldershot Town. In January 2024, he was linked with a move to League One side Exeter City.

=== Forest Green Rovers ===
On 30 August 2024, Cardwell joined fellow National League club Forest Green Rovers for an undisclosed fee after his release clause had been met.

On 4 December 2025, Cardwell returned to Southend United on loan for the remainder of the season with a view to a permanent deal upon the expiry of his Forest Green Rovers contract.

== International career ==
Cardwell is eligible to play for Scotland because two of his grandparents are from Midlothian.

He made his debut for the Scotland U19 team on 24 May 2014, coming off the bench in a 0–0 draw against Ukraine U21 at the Pirelli Stadium in England. He came off the bench and scored two goals in a 2–2 draw against Czech Republic U19 at Cappielow Park. He made ten appearances for Scotland U19 between May 2014 and March 2015. Cardwell was called up on 5 November 2014 to the Scotland U21 side. He made his debut for the U21 team in a 1–1 draw against Switzerland U21 in Switzerland.

== Style of play ==
He has been described as a physically centre forward with technical ability, pace and effective movement when leading the attack.

== Personal life ==
Cardwell's grandfather Tom Wilson was a Scottish centre back, who played for Millwall and Hull City.

== Career statistics ==
As of match played on 20 August 2024

Appearances and goals by club, season and competition
Club	Season	League			FA Cup		League Cup		Other		Total	
Club	Season	Division	Apps	Goals	Apps	Goals	Apps	Goals	Apps	Goals	Apps	Goals
Reading	2015–16	Championship	0	0	0	0	0	0	0	0	0	0
Reading	2016–17	Championship	0	0	0	0	0	0	2 (Note: Appearance(s) in EFL Trophy)	0	2	0
Reading	Total		0	0	0	0	0	0	2	0	2	0
Woking (loan)	2015–16	National League	5	0	0	0	—		0	0	5	0
Braintree Town (loan)	2015–16	National League	4	0	0	0	—		1 (Note: Appearance(s) in the National League play-offs)	0	5	0
Brighton & Hove Albion (loan)	2016–17	Championship	0	0	0	0	0	0	0	0	0	0
Grimsby Town	2017–18	League Two	16	0	1	0	1	0	3	1	21	1
Grimsby Town	2018–19	League Two	19	1	3	0	0	0	1	0	23	1
Grimsby Town	2019–20	League Two	2	0	2	0	2	0	3	1	9	1
Grimsby Town	Total		37	1	6	0	3	0	8	2	54	3
Chorley (loan)	2019–20	National League	1	1	0	0	—		0	0	1	1
Chorley	2020–21	National League North	11	1	6	2	—		0	0	17	3
Chorley	2021–22	National League North	13	7	0	0	—		1 (Note: Appearance(s) in FA Trophy)	0	14	7
Chorley	Total		24	8	6	2	0	0	1	0	31	10
Stockport County (loan)	2020–21	National League	18	5	—		—		1	0	19	5
Southend United	2021–22	National League	14	3	—		—		0	0	14	3
Southend United	2022–23	National League	23	5	0	0	—		3	2	26	7
Southend United	2023–24	National League	39	18	0	0	—		0	0	39	18
Southend United	2024–25	National League	5	1	0	0	—		0	0	5	1
Total			81	27	0	0	—		3	2	84	29
Forest Green Rovers	2024–25	National League	13	2	2	0	—		1 (Note: Appearance in National League Cup)	0	16	2
Career total			183	44	14	2	3	0	17	4	217	50

== Honours ==
Southend United

- FA Trophy: 2025–26
