= Ahkeem Rose =

Jamaican footballer (born 1998)

Personal information
- Full name: Ahkeem Shavon Rose
- Date of birth: 27 November 1998 (age 27)
- Place of birth: Jamaica
- Height: 1.75 m (5 ft 9 in)
- Positions: Winger; striker

Team information
- Current team: Hednesford Town

Youth career
- 2016–2017: Grimsby Town

Senior career*
Years	Team	Apps	(Gls)
2015–2016	Pelsall Villa	8	(5)
2015–2016	Heather St John's	26	(10)
2017–2020	Grimsby Town	34	(3)
2018	→ Boston United (loan)	3	(2)
2020–2021	Dover Athletic	15	(2)
2021–2023	Weymouth	53	(16)
2021	→ Wimborne Town (loan)	3	(1)
2023–2024	Ayr United	19	(3)
2024	→ Hamilton Academical (loan)	14	(7)
2024–2025	Hereford	26	(4)
2025–	Hednesford Town	11	(3)
- * Club domestic league appearances and goals as of 02:49, 13 August 2025 (UTC)

Ahkeem Shavon Rose (born 27 November 1998) is a Jamaican semi-professional footballer who plays as a winger or striker for National League North club Hednesford Town.

Rose notably played as a professional in the EFL for Grimsby Town where he scored 3 goals in 34 appearances. Prior to joining The Mariners he had played Non-League football for both Pelsall Villa and Heather St John's before initially signing for Grimsby's academy setup. In 2018 he had a spell on loan with Boston United and later joined Dover Athletic upon his release from Blundell Park.

== Career ==
Rose was born in Jamaica. He attended Sandwell College as a sports student in West Bromwich. Aged 16, Rose scored a hat-trick on his debut for Midland Football League Division One club Pelsall Villa in November 2015.

=== Grimsby Town ===
In December 2016, Rose had a two-week trial at EFL League Two club Grimsby Town. He signed an 18-month contract on 20 December 2016. Rose signed a new two-year contract on 26 June 2018. He made his first-team debut on 14 August 2018 coming on as a substitute in the 83rd minute against Rochdale in the EFL Cup.

On 6 September 2018, Rose joined Boston United on an initial one-month loan. He made three appearances and scored two goals for Boston, before returning to Grimsby on 6 October 2018.

Rose made his League Two debut on 6 October 2018, coming on in the 77th minute as a substitute in a 2–0 home win against Port Vale. He scored his first professional league goal on 17 November 2018, after coming off the substitutes bench in the 80th minute. With 4 minutes to go he rifled the ball into the top left corner, securing a 1–0 win for his team against Crawley Town.

=== Dover Athletic ===
On 7 September 2020, Rose signed for National League club Dover Athletic. Rose made his debut for the club on the opening day of the campaign, replacing Ade Azeez in the 73 minute of a 1–0 victory over Notts County. He scored his first goal on 16 January 2021, getting the equaliser in an eventual 3–1 defeat to Wrexham. Following's Dover's decision to not play any more matches in the 2020–21 season, made in late January, and subsequent null and voiding of all results, on 5 May 2021 it was announced that Rose was out of contract and had left the club.

=== Weymouth ===
On 13 July 2021, Rose joined National League side Weymouth. On 1 December 2021, he was sent out on a one-month loan deal to Southern Football League Premier Division South side Wimborne Town.

In May 2023 Rose announced on social media that he was leaving Weymouth after two years.

=== Ayr United ===
On 24 July 2023, Rose joined Scottish Championship club Ayr United on a two-year deal.

=== Hereford ===
On 7 August 2024, Rose returned to English football with Hereford, joining the National League North club on a short-term contract. A month later, on 9 September, it was announced that Rose had extended his stay at the club. This came the same day that strike partner Montel Gibson had left the club. He scored on his debut for The Bulls, a late equaliser in a 1–1 league draw away against Chorley on 17 August. Upon leaving the club, he had scored four goals in 30 appearances in all competitions.

=== Hednesford Town ===
On 4 February 2025, Hereford announced on their official website that Rose had signed for Northern Premier League Division One West club Hednesford Town.

== Career statistics ==
As of match played 12 August 2025

Appearances and goals by club, season and competition
Club	Season	League			National cup (Note: Includes FA Cup, Scottish Cup)		League cup (Note: Includes EFL Cup, Scottish League Cup)		Other		Total	
Club	Season	Division	Apps	Goals	Apps	Goals	Apps	Goals	Apps	Goals	Apps	Goals
Pelsall Villa	2015–16	Midland League Division One	8	5	0	0	—		0	0	8	5
Heather St John's	2015–16	Midland League Division One	9	4	0	0	—		0	0	9	4
Heather St John's	2016–17	Midland League Division One	17	6	0	0	—		0	0	17	6
Heather St John's	Total		26	10	0	0	0	0	0	0	26	10
Grimsby Town	2017–18	League Two	0	0	0	0	0	0	0	0	0	0
Grimsby Town	2018–19	League Two	16	1	0	0	1	0	3 (Note: Appearance(s) in EFL Trophy)	0	20	1
Grimsby Town	2019–20	League Two	18	2	2	0	0	0	3	0	23	2
Grimsby Town	Total		34	3	2	0	1	0	6	0	43	3
Boston United (loan)	2018–19	National League North	3	2	0	0	—		0	0	3	2
Dover Athletic	2020–21	National League	15	2	1	0	—		1 (Note: Appearance(s) in FA Trophy)	0	17	2
Weymouth	2021–22	National League	17	1	1	0	—		1	0	19	1
Weymouth	2022–23	National League South	36	15	3	2	—		1	0	40	17
Weymouth	Total		53	16	4	2	—		2	0	59	18
Wimborne Town (loan)	2021–22	SL Premier Division South	3	1	—		—		—		3	1
Ayr United	2023–24	Scottish Championship	19	3	1	1	2	1	1 (Note: Appearance in Scottish Challenge Cup)	0	23	5
Hamilton Academical (loan)	2023–24	Scottish League One	14	7	—		—		3 (Note: Appearances in Scottish League One play-offs)	1	17	8
Hereford	2024–25	National League North	26	4	3	0	—		1	0	30	4
Hednesford Town	2024–25	NPL Division One West	9	3	—		—		2 (Note: Appearances in Northern Premier League Division One West play-offs)	1	11	4
Hednesford Town	2025–26	NPL Premier Division	2	0	0	0	—		0	0	2	0
Hednesford Town	Total		11	3	0	0	—		2	1	13	4
Career total			212	56	11	3	3	1	16	2	242	62
