= Max Wright (English footballer) =

English footballer (born 1998)

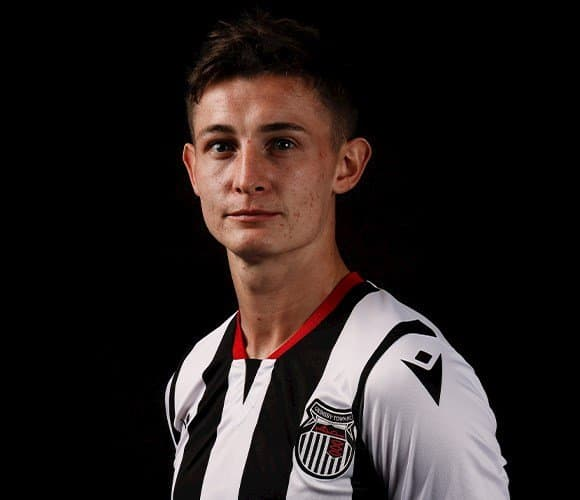

Personal information
- Full name: Max Wright
- Date of birth: 6 April 1998 (age 28)
- Place of birth: Grimsby, England
- Height: 5 ft 9 in (1.75 m)
- Position: Winger

Team information
- Current team: Hume City FC

Youth career
- 2008–2015: Grimsby Town

Senior career*
Years	Team	Apps	(Gls)
2015–2022	Grimsby Town	45	(4)
2016–2017	→ Sutton Coldfield Town (loan)	20	(4)
2017–2018	→ Scarborough Athletic (loan)	44	(15)
2018–2019	→ Boston United (loan)	24	(7)
2022–2023	Harrogate Town	3	(0)
2023	→ FC Halifax Town (loan)	6	(0)
2023–2026	FC Halifax Town	69	(8)
2026	→ Cleethorpes Town (loan)	7	(0)
2026–	Hume City FC	0	(0)
- * Club domestic league appearances and goals as of 12 January 2025

Max Wright (born 6 April 1998) is an English professional footballer who plays as a winger for Hume City FC.

He came through the youth ranks at Grimsby Town before earning a professional contract in 2015. He has also spent time on loan with Sutton Coldfield Town, Scarborough Athletic and Boston United. He joined Harrogate Town in 2022, but injury limited him to only 3 appearances before playing for FC Halifax Town and Cleethorpes Town.

== Career ==
=== Grimsby Town ===
Wright joined Northern Premier League Premier Division club Sutton Coldfield Town on an initial one-month loan on 12 January 2017. In February 2017, Wright extended his loan at Sutton Coldfield Town until the end of the season. He signed a new one-year contract in August 2017 with Grimsby Town. Wright joined Scarborough Athletic on 24 August 2017 on loan. He signed a new two-year contract with Grimsby on 5 June 2018.

Wright made his professional debut on 14 August 2018 coming on as a substitute in the 83rd minute against Rochdale in the EFL Cup.

On 6 September 2018, Wright joined Boston United on an initial one-month loan. The deal was extended with one further month, so it would end on 6 November 2018.

Wright was recalled from his loan spell by Grimsby Town with immediate effect on 26 April 2019, making his EFL debut on 29 April as a second-half substitute against Notts County.

Grimsby secured promotion with victory in the play-off final, though Wright was not in the matchday squad at London Stadium.

On 11 June 2022, the club announced their retained list ahead of the 2022–23 season and confirmed that Wright would be among those released when his contract expires on 30 June.

=== Harrogate Town ===
On 20 July 2022, Wright signed for fellow EFL League Two side Harrogate Town. A week after signing with Harrogate, Wright injured his ankle and was expected to be side-lined for a significant period. He would eventually make his debut on 26 December 2022, coming on as a late substitute in a 3-2 victory against his former team Grimsby Town.

On 29 January 2023, he joined FC Halifax Town on loan. Wright came off the bench in the 90th minute during Town's FA Trophy final victory over Gateshead at Wembley Stadium.

It was announced that Harrogate would not be renewing his contract and he would leave the club at the end of the 2022–23 season.

=== FC Halifax Town ===
Wright joined FC Halifax Town on 30 June 2023 on a permanent deal, following his loan spell at the end of the previous season. After an initial two-year contract to June 2025, Wright's contract was extended and he has featured included in the 2025/6 1st team squad for the National League club, wearing the No. 7 shirt.

== Career statistics ==
As of match played 23 January 2021

Appearances and goals by club, season and competition
Club	Season	League			FA Cup		League Cup		Other		Total	
Club	Season	Division	Apps	Goals	Apps	Goals	Apps	Goals	Apps	Goals	Apps	Goals
Grimsby Town	2017–18	League Two	0	0	0	0	0	0	0	0	0	0
Grimsby Town	2018–19	League Two	2	0	0	0	1	0	1 (Note: Appearance(s) in EFL Trophy)	0	4	0
Grimsby Town	2019–20	League Two	25	2	0	0	3	0	1	0	29	2
Grimsby Town	2020–21	League Two	6	1	0	0	1	0	1	0	8	1
Grimsby Town	Total		33	3	0	0	5	0	3	0	41	3
Career total			33	3	0	0	5	0	3	0	41	3

== Honours ==
Grimsby Town

- National League play-offs: 2022

FC Halifax Town

- FA Trophy: 2022–23
