= Luke Hendrie =

English footballer (born 1994)

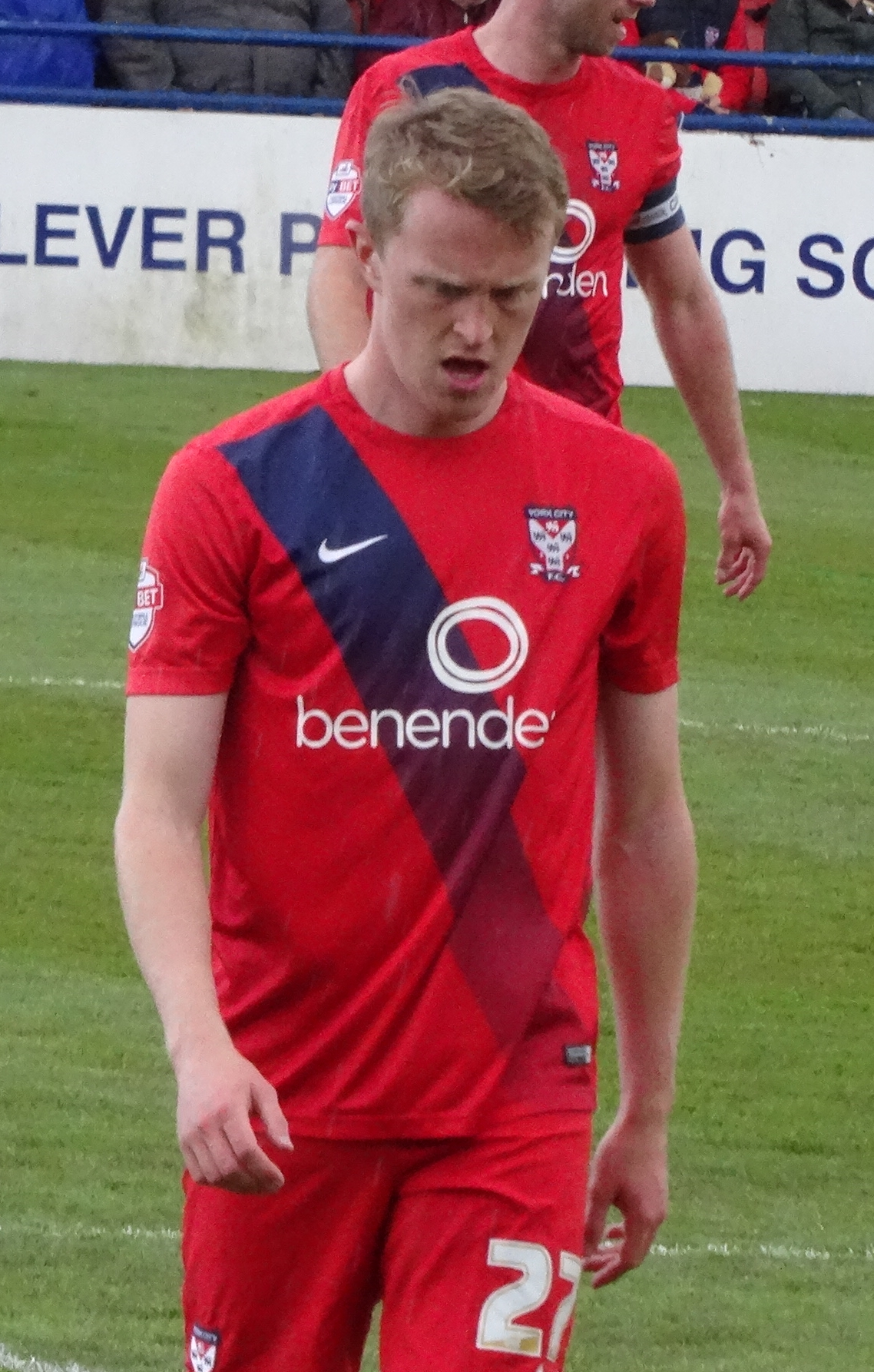
- Hendrie playing for York City in 2016

Personal information
- Full name: Luke John Hendrie
- Date of birth: 27 August 1994 (age 32)
- Place of birth: Leeds, England
- Height: 6 ft 2 in (1.87 m)
- Positions: Defender; midfielder

Team information
- Current team: Bradford (Park Avenue)

Youth career
- Bradford City
- –2013: Manchester United
- 2013–2015: Derby County

Senior career*
Years	Team	Apps	(Gls)
2015–2018	Burnley	0	(0)
2015	→ Hartlepool United (loan)	3	(0)
2016	→ York City (loan)	18	(0)
2016–2017	→ Kilmarnock (loan)	32	(0)
2017–2018	→ Bradford City (loan)	13	(0)
2018–2019	Shrewsbury Town	10	(0)
2018–2019	→ Grimsby Town (loan)	21	(1)
2019–2021	Grimsby Town	90	(4)
2021–2022	Hartlepool United	7	(0)
2022–2024	Bradford City	18	(0)
2023–2024	→ Hartlepool United (loan)	21	(0)
2024–2025	Morecambe	36	(0)
2025–	Bradford (Park Avenue)	30	(0)

International career
2009	England U16	1	(0)
2010	England U17	5	(0)
- * Club domestic league appearances and goals as of 17:30, 24 May 2026 (UTC)

Luke John Hendrie (born 7 August 1994) is an English professional footballer who plays as a defender for Northern Premier League Division One East club Bradford (Park Avenue).

He began his career with Premier League side Manchester United and later transferred to both Derby County and Burnley. His time at Turf Moor saw loan spells with Hartlepool United, York City, Kilmarnock and his boyhood club Bradford City, before earning a permanent transfer to Shrewsbury Town and later Grimsby Town. He is a former England U17 international and earned 5 caps in 2010.

== Early and personal life ==
Born in Leeds, West Yorkshire, Hendrie grew up in Menston and attended St Mary's Menston Catholic Voluntary Academy in the village. He comes from a footballing family, with his father John Hendrie who previously played for Bradford City, Middlesbrough and Leeds United and his great-uncle Paul Hendrie, who was a former player and manager in the Football League. His father's cousins are former England international Lee Hendrie and former Morecambe striker Stuart Hendrie.

He graduated from Staffordshire University in 2017 with a first-class degree in Professional Sports Writing and Broadcasting.

== Club career ==
=== Early career ===
Hendrie started his career in the youth team with Bradford City before signing for the academy at Manchester United as a teenager. He progressed through the academy originally starting as a right-back, before forcing himself into his favoured position of central midfield, making 25 appearances and scoring three goals during the 2011–12 season. In July 2012, he signed his first professional contract with Manchester United, agreeing a one-year deal. He managed only 76 minutes of under-21 football during his first year as a professional and was released at the end of the season, having failed to make the breakthrough to the first team.

Following his release he joined Championship club Derby County on trial, eventually signing a two-year contract. He spent the majority of his time with Derby in the Development Squad and he failed to make a first-team appearance and was released in May 2015. He subsequently joined League One club Bradford City on trial during pre-season.

=== Burnley ===
In August 2015, he signed a one-year contract with Championship club Burnley with the option of a further year, having featured against them in a pre-season friendly for Bradford City. In October 2015, having mainly featured for the Development Squad, he signed for League Two club Hartlepool United on an initial one-month loan deal. He made his professional debut in the 1–0 away win over Dagenham & Redbridge, playing the full ninety minutes. He made three appearances for Hartlepool during the month before returning to Burnley.

Hendrie joined League Two club York City on 7 January 2016 on a one-month loan.

On 19 August 2016, Hendrie joined Scottish Premiership club Kilmarnock on loan until January 2017. He made his debut a day later, against Ross County. The loan agreement between Burnley and Kilmarnock was subsequently extended to the end of the 2016–17 season.

On 21 August 2017, he signed for League One club Bradford City on loan until January 2018. He made 18 appearances, and left after failing to agree an extension to his loan.

=== Shrewsbury Town ===
Hendrie signed for League One club Shrewsbury Town on 9 January 2018 on an 18-month contract for an undisclosed fee. On 18 August 2018, Hendrie joined League Two club Grimsby Town on loan until January 2019.

=== Grimsby Town ===
Hendrie signed for Grimsby permanently on 11 January 2019 on a two-and-a-half-year contract.

Following Grimsby's relegation from the Football League, Hendrie was offered a new contract but on 15 July 2021 having yet to accept a deal the club officially retracted the offer with manager Paul Hurst stating that he had already gone past several deadlines in order to sign, commenting further that during this period The Mariners had gone on sign two right backs in Michee Efete and Ryan Sears in preparation for the 2021–22 season.

=== Hartlepool United ===
Hendrie signed a contract with Hartlepool United on 30 August 2021. On 31 January 2022, Hendrie had his contract terminated by the club.

=== Bradford City ===
Later in the day, Hendrie was signed by Bradford City. He was one of seven players offered a new contract by Bradford City at the end of the 2021–22 season.

On 1 September 2023, Hendrie re-signed for National League side Hartlepool United for a third spell on a season-long loan from Bradford. On 26 February 2024, it was announced that Hendrie would miss the rest of the season due to a hamstring injury and would therefore return to Bradford to complete his rehabilitation. He made 23 appearances for Hartlepool during his loan spell.

He was released by Bradford City at the end of the 2023–24 season.

=== Morecambe ===
Hendrie was one of 15 free agents that signed for League Two club Morecambe on 12 July 2024, after the club's embargo on registering new players was lifted.

=== Bradford (Park Avenue) ===
On 1 September 2025, Hendrie joined Northern Premier League Division One East club Bradford (Park Avenue).

== International career ==
Hendrie is eligible to play for England, and Scotland who he qualifies for through his father. In October 2009, he received his first call-up to the England under-16 team for the international friendly against Wales, making his debut in a 1–0 win. He also gained five caps for the under-17 team, making two appearances in the 2011 UEFA European Under-17 Championship qualifiers against Poland and Georgia.

In May 2013, he received a call up to the Scotland under-20 team for a youth tournament in the Netherlands.

== Coaching career ==
Hendrie holds a UEFA A coaching licence. In September 2025, he combined his playing career with a full-time role coaching as Bradford City's Lead Youth Development Phase coach. Prior to this, he had been coaching part-time in the club's academy.

== Career statistics ==
As of match played 2 May 2026

Appearances and goals by club, season and competition
Club	Season	League			National Cup (Note: Includes Scottish Cup and FA Cup)		League Cup		Other		Total	
Club	Season	Division	Apps	Goals	Apps	Goals	Apps	Goals	Apps	Goals	Apps	Goals
Derby County	2013–14	Championship	0	0	0	0	0	0	0	0	0	0
Derby County	2014–15	Championship	0	0	0	0	0	0	—		0	0
Derby County	Total		0	0	0	0	0	0	0	0	0	0
Burnley	2015–16	Championship	0	0	—		0	0	—		0	0
Burnley	2016–17	Premier League	0	0	—		—		—		0	0
Burnley	2017–18	Premier League	0	0	—		—		—		0	0
Burnley	Total		0	0	—		0	0	—		0	0
Hartlepool United (loan)	2015–16	League Two	3	0	—		—		—		3	0
York City (loan)	2015–16	League Two	18	0	—		—		—		18	0
Kilmarnock (loan)	2016–17	Scottish Premiership	32	0	1	0	—		—		33	0
Bradford City (loan)	2017–18	League One	13	0	2	0	—		3 (Note: Appearance(s) in EFL Trophy)	0	18	0
Shrewsbury Town	2017–18	League One	10	0	—		—		0	0	10	0
Shrewsbury Town	2018–19	League One	0	0	—		0	0	—		0	0
Shrewsbury Town	Total		10	0	0	0	0	0	0	0	10	0
Grimsby Town	2018–19	League Two	41	1	3	0	—		2	0	46	1
Grimsby Town	2019–20	League Two	32	1	0	0	3	0	1	0	36	1
Grimsby Town	2020–21	League Two	38	2	1	0	0	0	0	0	39	2
Grimsby Town	Total		111	4	4	0	3	0	3	0	121	5
Hartlepool United	2021–22	League Two	7	0	1	0	0	0	3	0	11	0
Bradford City	2021–22	League Two	16	0	0	0	0	0	0	0	16	0
Bradford City	2022–23	League Two	2	0	0	0	0	0	3	0	5	0
Bradford City	2023–24	League Two	0	0	0	0	1	0	0	0	1	0
Bradford City	Total		18	0	0	0	1	0	3	0	22	0
Hartlepool United (loan)	2023–24	National League	21	0	1	0	0	0	1 (Note: Appearance in FA Trophy)	0	23	0
Morecambe	2024–25	League Two	34	0	3	0	1	0	2	0	40	0
Morecambe	2025–26	National League	2	0	0	0	—		0	0	2	0
Morecambe	Total		36	0	3	0	1	0	2	0	42	0
Bradford Park Avenue	2025–26	NPL East Division	30	0	0	0	—		8	0	38	0
Career total			299	5	12	0	5	0	23	0	339	5
