= Jake Hessenthaler =

English footballer

Personal information
- Full name: Jakob Andrew Hessenthaler
- Date of birth: 20 April 1994 (age 32)
- Place of birth: Gravesend, England
- Height: 5 ft 9 in (1.76 m)
- Position: Midfielder

Team information
- Current team: Ebbsfleet United

Youth career
- 2002–2009: Chelsea
- 2009–2013: Gillingham

Senior career*
Years	Team	Apps	(Gls)
2013–2018	Gillingham	159	(7)
2012	→ Whitstable Town (loan)		
2013	→ Merstham (loan)		
2013	→ Lewes (loan)		
2013	→ Tamworth (loan)	6	(0)
2013	→ Margate (loan)	6	(0)
2018–2020	Grimsby Town	72	(1)
2020–2023	Crawley Town	99	(5)
2023	→ Woking (loan)	7	(0)
2023–2025	Dagenham & Redbridge	80	(2)
2025–	Ebbsfleet United	0	(0)
- * Club domestic league appearances and goals as of 09:26, 6 June 2025 (UTC)

Jakob Andrew Hessenthaler (born 20 April 1994) is an English professional footballer who plays as a midfielder for National League South club Ebbsfleet United.

He initially came through the youth academy at Chelsea, before later turning professional with Gillingham. He went on to play 181 times over a five-year stay that also brought loan spells with non-league sides Merstham, Lewes, Tamworth and Margate. He joined Grimsby Town where he remained for several seasons before joining Crawley Town in 2020.

== Career ==
=== Gillingham ===
Born in Gravesend, Kent, Hessenthaler began his career with Chelsea as an Under-8 in their youth system and was 15 when Chelsea released him after seven years with the club.

He signed his first professional contract with Gillingham in February 2013. In February 2012, he joined Isthmian League Division One South side Whitstable Town on a work-experience loan, along with Josh Hare. In January 2013, Hessenthaler signed for Merstham on loan. After loan spells with non-League clubs Lewes, Tamworth and Margate, he made his debut for Gillingham on 30 November 2013 as an 85th minute substitute in a 4–1 away league loss to Rotherham United.

On 7 February 2014, Hessenthaler signed a new long-term deal at Gillingham to keep him contracted until the end of the 2017–18 season. He scored his first goal for Gillingham in a 4–2 win at home to Coventry City on 11 March 2014, with a 40-yard strike in the 90th minute. His goal against Coventry earned him Gillingham's 'Goal of the Season' award, whilst he also won the club's 'Young Player of the Year' award for the 2013–14 season.

=== Grimsby Town ===
He was released by Gillingham at the end of the 2017–18 season and signed a two-year contract with Grimsby Town on 25 June 2018. He scored his first goal for Grimsby in a 2–1 EFL Trophy win over Notts County on 4 September 2018.

On 28 January 2020, he suffered a punctured lung, a broken rib, and ligament damage across the shoulder and collarbone as a result of a challenge by Simeon Jackson in the first minute of a 3–1 victory over Stevenage.

=== Crawley Town ===
Hessenthaler was released by Grimsby at the end of the 2019–20 season. On 1 September 2020, he signed for fellow League Two side Crawley Town. He scored his first goal for Crawley on 30 January 2021 in a 3–1 defeat against Cambridge United.

On 31 January 2023, Hessenthaler joined National League club Woking on loan until the end of the season.

=== Dagenham & Redbridge ===
On 21 July 2023, Hessenthaler signed a two-year deal with Dagenham & Redbridge.

=== Ebbsfleet United ===
In June 2025, Hessenthaler joined Ebbsfleet United following their relegation to the National League South.

== Personal life ==
Hessenthaler is the son of former Gillingham player and manager Andy Hessenthaler, the nephew of Darren Hare, who has worked as Gillingham's youth team manager, and the cousin of former Gillingham teammate Josh Hare.

== Honours ==
Individual

- Gillingham Young Player of the Season: 2013–14

== Career statistics ==
As of match played 5 May 2025

Appearances and goals by club, season and competition
Club	Season	League			FA Cup		League Cup		Other		Total	
Club	Season	Division	Apps	Goals	Apps	Goals	Apps	Goals	Apps	Goals	Apps	Goals
Gillingham	2012–13	League Two	0	0	0	0	0	0	0	0	0	0
Gillingham	2013–14	League One	19	1	0	0	0	0	0	0	19	1
Gillingham	2014–15	League One	37	1	1	0	1	0	6 (Note: Appearance(s) in Football League Trophy)	0	45	1
Gillingham	2015–16	League One	38	4	1	0	2	1	2	0	43	5
Gillingham	2016–17	League One	28	1	2	1	1	0	2 (Note: Appearance(s) in EFL Trophy)	0	33	2
Gillingham	2017–18	League One	37	0	2	0	1	0	1	0	41	0
Gillingham	Total		159	7	6	1	5	1	11	0	181	9
Tamworth (loan)	2012–13	Conference Premier	6	0	—		—		—		6	0
Margate (loan)	2013–14	IL Premier Division	6	0	—		—		—		6	0
Grimsby Town	2018–19	League Two	44	0	3	0	1	0	2	1	50	1
Grimsby Town	2019–20	League Two	28	1	2	0	3	0	2	0	35	1
Grimsby Town	Total		72	1	5	0	4	0	4	1	85	2
Crawley Town	2020–21	League Two	46	1	4	0	0	0	1	0	51	1
Crawley Town	2021–22	League Two	32	4	1	0	1	0	1	0	35	4
Crawley Town	2022–23	League Two	21	0	1	1	3	0	2	0	27	1
Crawley Town	Total		99	5	6	1	4	0	4	0	113	6
Woking (loan)	2022–23	National League	7	0	—		—		—		7	0
Dagenham & Redbridge	2023–24	National League	46	1	1	0	—		1	0	48	1
Dagenham & Redbridge	2024–25	National League	34	1	2	0	—		4 (Note: One appearance in the FA Trophy, three in the National League Cup)	0	40	1
Dagenham & Redbridge	Total		80	2	3	0	—		5	0	88	2
Career total			429	15	20	2	13	1	24	1	486	19
