= Louis Robles =

English footballer

Personal information
- Full name: Louis Gabriel Robles
- Date of birth: 11 September 1996 (age 30)
- Place of birth: Liverpool, England
- Position: Winger

Team information
- Current team: Colwyn Bay
- Number: 10

Youth career
- 2005–2013: Liverpool
- 2013–2015: Wigan Athletic

College career
Years	Team	Apps	(Gls)
2016	Limestone Saints	19	(14)

Senior career*
Years	Team	Apps	(Gls)
2015–2016	Wigan Athletic	1	(0)
2016	→ Macclesfield Town (loan)	1	(0)
2016	→ Gloucester City (loan)	7	(3)
2017	Bangor City	7	(2)
2017	Atlético Baleares	5	(0)
2017–2018	San Roque de Lepe	53	(12)
2018	Grimsby Town	1	(0)
2018–2019	San Roque de Lepe	13	(1)
2019–2020	Bala Town	24	(11)
2020–2022	The New Saints	55	(14)
2022–2024	Newtown	63	(17)
2024–2025	Bala Town	19	(1)
2025–	Colwyn Bay	46	(6)
- * Club domestic league appearances and goals as of 08:35, 8 November 2026 (UTC)

Louis Gabriel Robles (born 11 September 1996) is an English professional footballer who plays as a winger for Cymru Premier club Colwyn Bay.

At the age of nine, Robles began his professional career at Liverpool in 2005 with their academy for the next eight years. He then joined Wigan Athletic aged 16. Loan moves to Macclesfield Town and Gloucester City followed in the 2015–16 season. Robles switched to the USA later in 2016 joining Limestone Saints representing Limestone College. In January 2017, he joined Welsh Premier League side Bangor City.

Robles made the move to Spain in February 2017, joining Segunda Division B side Atlético Baleares, before joining the Tercera División side San Roque de Lepe for the 2017–18 season. In June 2018, Robles moved back to England and joined EFL League Two club Grimsby Town, before moving back to San Roque de Lepe in December 2018.

== Club career ==
=== Wigan Athletic ===
Robles was born in Liverpool and attended St Edward's College Catholic school in West Derby, Liverpool. He started his career with Liverpool Academy as an Under-9 player and spent the next eight years there.

Signed as a 16-year-old from Liverpool in 2013, Robles was offered his first professional contract with Wigan Athletic in March 2015. He was first included in a Wigan Athletic matchday squad on 17 February 2015, remaining an unused substitute for their 0–1 Championship win away to Reading at the Madejski Stadium. He was again an unused substitute in two more matches that week. He made his professional Football League debut on 2 May on the final day of the season, with Wigan already relegated to League One, replacing Marc-Antoine Fortuné after 64 minutes of an eventual 0–3 defeat to Brentford at Griffin Park.

On 8 January 2016, Robles and teammate Adam Anson were loaned to National League side Macclesfield Town until the end of the season. He made his only appearance for the Silkmen 15 days later, replacing Danny Rowe for the final ten minutes of a 0–2 loss to Aldershot Town at Moss Rose. Three days later, he and Anson returned to Wigan.

On 24 March, Robles was loaned to Gloucester City of the National League North for the rest of the season. He made seven appearances for the Tigers, four of which were starts, scoring one goal. Robles was released by Wigan Athletic in June 2016.

=== Later career ===
After being released by Wigan Athletic, Robles moved to the United States and represented Limestone Saints in college soccer, scoring 14 goals and five assists. He was credited with the Conference Carolinas Second-Team All-Conference Carolinas and Freshman of the Year awards at the end of season.

On 27 January 2017, Robles signed for Welsh Premier League side Bangor City. He made his only appearance for the Citizens the next day in a 4–0 home win over Llandudno in the Welsh Cup fourth round, scoring two goals.

Robles moved to Spain on 31 January when he signed for Segunda Division B side Atlético Baleares. He made his Spanish third-tier debut as an 80th-minute substitute in a 1–0 defeat at Sabadell on 12 February, and totalled five appearances during his time in Mallorca.

Robles transferred to Tercera División side San Roque de Lepe for the 2017–18 season where he scored 6 times in 33 appearances.

In June 2018, Robles went back to England and joined EFL League Two side Grimsby Town on a one-year contract. On 28 December he was released by mutual consent having featured five times during his spell.

The same day, he returned to San Roque de Lepe. On 29 July 2019 he came back to the Cymru Premier to sign for Bala Town.

In 2020 he joined The New Saints, and left the club in June 2022 after he rejected a new contract offer at the end of the 2021–22 season. Robles scored three Europa league qualification goals during his time at TNS, most notably in a 3-1 loss away to Viktoria Plzen.

He joined Newtown in 2022 before moving back to Bala Town in June 2024. In July 2025 he joined Colwyn Bay.

== Style of play ==
Robles plays in a centre forward role or an out and out No.9 striker, he can also operate as a winger on both flanks.

== Personal life ==
Robles was born in England and is of Spanish descent.

== Career statistics ==
As of match played on 13 November 2018

Appearances and goals by club, season and competition
Club	Season	League			Cup (Note: Cup competitions include the FA Cup, Welsh Cup, Copa del Rey)		League Cup		Other		Total	
Club	Season	Division	Apps	Goals	Apps	Goals	Apps	Goals	Apps	Goals	Apps	Goals
Wigan Athletic	2014–15	EFL Championship	1	0	0	0	0	0	—		1	0
Macclesfield Town (loan)	2015–16	National League	1	0	0	0	—		—		1	0
Gloucester City (loan)	2015–16	National League North	7	1	0	0	—		—		7	1
Limestone Saints	2016	NCAA Division II	19	14	—		—		—		19	14
Bangor City	2016–17	Welsh Premier League	0	0	1	2	—		—		1	2
Atlético Baleares	2016–17	Segunda División B	5	0	0	0	—		—		5	0
San Roque de Lepe	2017–18	Tercera División	33	6	0	0	—		—		33	6
Grimsby Town	2018–19	EFL League Two	1	0	0	0	1	0	3 (Note: Appearance(s) in EFL Trophy)	0	5	0
Career total			67	21	1	2	1	0	3	0	72	23

== Honours ==
Wigan Athletic U18s

- Lancashire FA Youth Cup: 2014–15
- Football League Youth Alliance League 3 North-West Division champions: 2015–16

Individual

- Wigan Athletic Michael Millett Young Player of the Year: 2014–15
- Conference Carolinas All-Tournament Team: 2016
- Conference Carolinas Freshman of the Year: 2016
- Conference Carolinas Second-Team All-Conference Carolinas: 2016

Cymru Premier Player of the Month- November 2019

=== The New Saints ===
- Cymru Premier: 2021–22
- Welsh cup: 2021-22
