= Harry Clifton (footballer, born 1998) =

Welsh footballer (born 1998)

Personal information
- Full name: Harry Louis Clifton
- Date of birth: 12 June 1998 (age 28)
- Place of birth: Grimsby, England
- Height: 1.80 m (5 ft 11 in)
- Positions: Midfielder; winger

Team information
- Current team: Doncaster Rovers
- Number: 15

Youth career
- 2007–2015: Grimsby Town

Senior career*
Years	Team	Apps	(Gls)
2015–2024	Grimsby Town	238	(21)
2016–2017	→ Grantham Town (loan)	38	(5)
2024–	Doncaster Rovers	81	(9)

International career
2019–2020	Wales U21	6	(0)
- * Club domestic league appearances and goals as of 14 October 2026 (UTC)

Harry Louis Clifton (born 12 June 1998) is a professional footballer who plays as a midfielder and winger for EFL League One club Doncaster Rovers. He is a former Wales under-21 international.

== Club career ==
=== Grimsby Town ===
Clifton joined Grimsby Town as an under-10 and progressed through the club's youth system.

Clifton signed his first professional contract in July 2015. He joined NPL Premier Division side Grantham Town in September 2016, initially on a month's loan deal. After impressing in his initial loan, it was then extended another two months. After scoring 3 goals in 21 appearances, his loan was extended in December 2016 until the end of the 2016–17 season. Clifton made 47 appearances for them, scoring six goals. He returned to Grimsby in May 2017, signing another two-year deal.

Clifton made his full debut on 29 August 2017 in the EFL Trophy against Doncaster Rovers. He made his professional League Two debut on 30 January 2018, coming on as a 79th-minute substitute, in a 3–0 defeat at Yeovil Town. Clifton made his full league debut against Exeter City on 24 February.

He signed a new three-year contract with Grimsby in June 2018.

Clifton scored his first professional league goal on 27 November 2018, scoring an equaliser in the 33rd minute with a header, in a 5–2 win against Tranmere Rovers. Three days later, he scored Grimsby's second goal on 70-minutes in the FA Cup second round, racing through on goal scoring a follow-up after his initial shot was saved, in a 2–0 victory against National League side Chesterfield.

Clifton played the full 120 minutes of the 2022 National League play-off final as Grimsby beat Solihull Moors 2–1 at the London Stadium to return to the Football League.

On 24 June 2022, Clifton signed a new two-year deal with The Mariners.

Clifton was part of the Grimsby team that reached the FA Cup quarter final for the first time since 1939, he played the full 90 minutes of the 2–1 win away at Premier League side Southampton that secured that achievement.

On 5 May 2023, Clifton won the Supporters' Player of the Year award, and four other awards, at the club's annual Player of the Season awards night.

Following the conclusion of the 2023–24 season, Clifton was offered a new contract. On 2 June 2024, the club announced that Clifton would be departing the club upon the expiration of his contract at the end of the month.

=== Doncaster Rovers ===
On 2 June 2024, Clifton was announced to have agreed a two-year deal with Doncaster Rovers with the club holding the option for a further twelve months.

Clifton made his competitive debut for Doncaster Rovers on 10 August 2024, coming off the bench in a 4–1 victory over Accrington Stanley in the opening fixture of the 2024–25 League Two season Clifton scored his first goal for the club on 24 August 2024, netting the only goal in a 1–0 league win against Morecambe

On 5 October 2024, Clifton faced former Club Grimsby Town, With Doncaster winning 3–0 at Blundell Park

In the FA Cup third round against Hull City, Clifton played a key role by converting the decisive penalty in a shoot-out, helping Doncaster progress after the match finished level following extra time

In his first season with the club, Doncaster were promoted as champions of EFL League Two.

== International career ==
Clifton was called up to the Wales Under-21's squad to join their training camp at the end of March 2019.

== Career statistics ==
As of match played on 8 March 2025

Appearances and goals by club, season and competition
Club	Season	League			FA Cup		EFL Cup		Other		Total	
Club	Season	Division	Apps	Goals	Apps	Goals	Apps	Goals	Apps	Goals	Apps	Goals
Grimsby Town	2015–16	National League	0	0	0	0	—		0	0	0	0
Grimsby Town	2016–17	League Two	0	0	0	0	0	0	0	0	0	0
Grimsby Town	2017–18	League Two	10	0	0	0	0	0	3 (Note: Appearance(s) in EFL Trophy)	0	13	0
Grimsby Town	2018–19	League Two	39	2	3	1	0	0	1	0	43	3
Grimsby Town	2019–20	League Two	25	0	2	0	1	0	1	0	29	0
Grimsby Town	2020–21	League Two	35	2	1	0	0	0	1	0	37	2
Grimsby Town	2021–22	National League	43	7	1	0	—		0	0	44	7
Grimsby Town	2022–23	League Two	44	7	7	2	2	0	4	0	57	9
Grimsby Town	2023–24	League Two	42	3	2	0	1	0	1	1	46	4
Grimsby Town	Total		238	21	16	3	4	0	11	1	269	25
Grantham Town (loan)	2016–17	NPL Premier Division	38	5	0	0	—		9 (Note: Three appearances and one goal in FA Trophy, six appearances in Northern Premier League Challenge Cup)	1	47	6
Doncaster Rovers	2024–25	League Two	41	7	3	0	1	0	2	1	38	5
Doncaster Rovers	2025–26	League One	37	2	2	0	1	0	2	0	36	2
Doncaster Rovers	2026–27	League One	3	0	0	0	1	0	2	0	6	0
Career total			308	30	19	3	5	0	22	23	354	36

== Honours ==
Grimsby Town

- National League play-offs: 2022

Doncaster Rovers

- EFL League Two: 2024–25

Individual

- Grimsby Town Player of the Year: 2022–23
- Grimsby Town Young Player of the Year: 2017–18, 2018–19
