= Sam Russell (footballer, born 1982) =

English footballer and coach

Personal information
- Full name: Samuel Ian Russell
- Date of birth: 4 October 1982 (age 44)
- Place of birth: Middlesbrough, England
- Height: 6 ft 0 in (1.83 m)
- Position: Goalkeeper

Team information
- Current team: Forest Green Rovers (Academy Goalkeeping Coach)

Youth career
- –2000: Middlesbrough

Senior career*
Years	Team	Apps	(Gls)
2000–2004	Middlesbrough	0	(0)
2002	→ Gateshead (loan)	19	(0)
2002–2003	→ Darlington (loan)	1	(0)
2003	→ Scunthorpe United (loan)	10	(0)
2004–2007	Darlington	107	(0)
2007–2009	Rochdale	38	(0)
2009–2010	Wrexham	18	(0)
2010–2012	Darlington	65	(0)
2012–2015	Forest Green Rovers	144	(0)
2015–2016	Gateshead	44	(0)
2016–2018	Forest Green Rovers	51	(0)
2018–2021	Grimsby Town	11	(0)
Total		508	(0)
- * Club domestic league appearances and goals as of 11:16, 5 March 2021 (UTC)

Samuel Ian Russell (born 4 October 1982) is a former professional footballer

As a player he was a goalkeeper from 2000 until 2021. He began his career in the Premier League with Middlesbrough although he failed to make a first team appearance but would notably go on to have three spells with Darlington between 2002 and 2012. He also played for Gateshead, Scunthorpe United, Rochdale, Wrexham and Forest Green Rovers before joining Grimsby Town in 2018 where he combined playing duties as James McKeown's number two with coaching the clubs goalkeepers.

== Playing career ==
=== Middlesbrough ===
Russell was born in Middlesbrough, North Yorkshire and signed as a professional on 7 July 2000 for his hometown team after progressing through their youth system. He had a successful loan spell at Gateshead during the tail end of the 2001–02 season, followed by a brief period at Darlington on loan in 2002 after Mick Tait brought him in during a keeping crisis. He played in only one game, a 1–1 draw against Torquay United.

In August 2003 he was sent to Scunthorpe United on loan where he stayed for three months and made 10 appearances. He finally left Middlesbrough in the summer of 2004, moving to Darlington on a permanent basis. He never appeared in Middlesbrough's first team.

=== Darlington ===
He was brought to Darlington by David Hodgson in August 2004. With the retirement of goalkeeping legend Andy Collett, the club only had two goalkeepers on their books in Michael Price and youth team player Jack Norton. Russell was a target for Hodgson after he heard that Middlesbrough were releasing the youngster. Initially it was thought Russell would be number two to Price, but performances during pre-season meant that Russell got the nod. Assistant manager Mark Proctor said that both Price and Russell were of virtual equal quality but Russell's distribution was slightly better.

In the opening game of the 2004–05 season Russell made his mark with a superb performance which earned him the man of the match. His superb saves kept Darlington in the game and meant Darlington hung on to an opening day victory. He was ever-present in the first team in the 2004–05 season, and signed a new two-year contract in July 2005.

He seemed to have established himself as the number one until just before the start of the 2007–08 season until failed to agree terms with then manager Dave Penny and Russell left to go to Rochdale and left Darlington in June 2007 after three years in which he made 107 league appearances.

=== Rochdale ===
In July 2007 he signed for Rochdale, making his first start for the club in the Football League Trophy second round tie against Bury in October 2007. Following an injury to regular keeper James Spencer, Russell was next called upon in the FA Cup defeat at Southend United. He retained his place in the side and in December 2007, signed a contract until the end of the season having been on non-contract terms. He broke a finger in the 2–1 defeat at Lincoln City in February 2008 and was expected to be out of action until April.

In the 2008–09 season Russell was handed the number one shirt for Rochdale. He had made some important saves for Rochdale that season, however he made the occasional mistake, such as scoring an own goal in the Rochdale–Bury derby, and slipping in a late equaliser by Jamie Ward against Chesterfield despite a Tom Kennedy late winner. In February he was replaced by Blackburn loanee Frank Fielding after Spencer was loaned out to Chester City.

=== Wrexham ===
After being released by Rochdale at the end of the season, Russell signed for Conference National side Wrexham after impressing on trial.

=== Return to Darlington ===
In May 2010 he agreed to rejoin Darlington on a one-year contract. He became their regular goalkeeper, and played at Wembley as they beat Mansfield Town to win the FA Trophy. He signed a one-year contract extension, but when the club suffered financial difficulties and failed to pay the players, he submitted his 14-day notice at the end of December and left the club for fellow Conference club Forest Green Rovers in January 2012.

=== Forest Green Rovers ===
Russell made his Forest Green debut on 21 January 2012 in a 0–0 draw against Newport County. In his first eight Forest Green performances he saved four consecutive penalty kicks. He made his hundredth league appearance for the club in a 2–1 win over Grimsby Town on 18 March 2014. In March 2014, he signed a contract extension to remain with the club.

A run of 144 consecutive league appearances for Forest Green was brought to an end on 21 February 2015 when he was replaced by Steve Arnold for a 3–0 win over AFC Telford United. On 4 May 2015, it was announced that he was leaving Forest Green after his contract had come to an end.

=== Gateshead ===
In June 2015, Russell joined National League side Gateshead, returning to a club where over a decade earlier he had spent time on loan.

=== Return to Forest Green Rovers ===
On 1 July 2016, it was announced that Russell had returned to former club Forest Green Rovers on a two-year deal. He made his 150th league appearance for the club in a 4–1 away win over Maidstone United on 27 August 2016. Between 17 September 2016 and 29 October 2016, he kept a run of seven National League clean sheets, until Oliver Hawkins header in a 1–1 draw with Dagenham & Redbridge saw him concede and narrowly miss out on the league record of eight consecutive clean sheets set by Alan Julian for Stevenage.

Russell appeared in every single of minute of Forest Green's 2016–17 campaign, as he helped the club secure promotion to the Football League for the first time in their history with a 3-1 National League play-off final win against Tranmere Rovers at Wembley Stadium. He was rewarded with a new one-year contract in June 2017 for Forest Green's first season in League Two.

He was released by Forest Green at the end of the 2017–18 season.

== Coaching career ==
=== Grimsby Town ===
On 9 July 2018 he joined Grimsby Town as the club's new player / goalkeeper coach.

Russell retired from playing at the end of the 2020–21 season but remained Paul Hurst's first team goalkeeping coach. On 25 June 2022, Russell announced via his Twitter account that he was leaving Grimsby.

Russell returned to former club Forest Green Rovers as an academy goalkeeping coach in November 2022.

== Career statistics ==
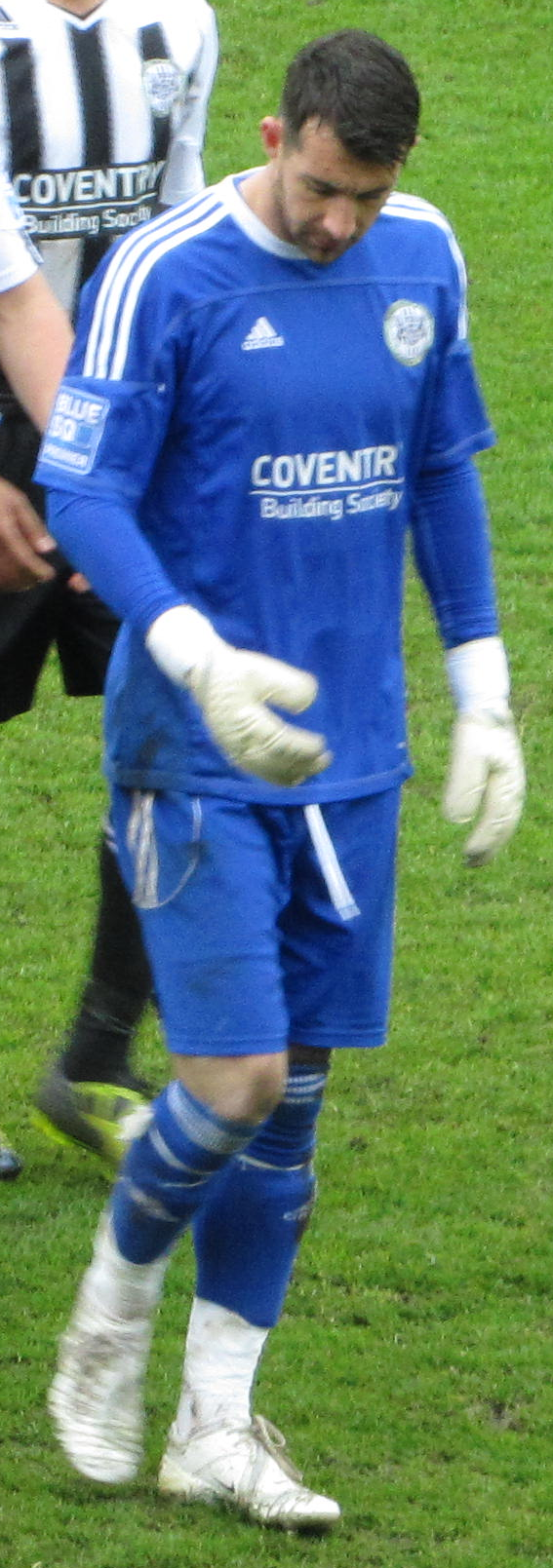
Russell playing for Forest Green Rovers in 2012

As of match played 2 January 2021

Club statistics
Club	Season	League			FA Cup		League Cup		Other		Total	
Club	Season	Division	Apps	Goals	Apps	Goals	Apps	Goals	Apps	Goals	Apps	Goals
Middlesbrough	2001–02	Premier League	0	0	0	0	0	0	0	0	0	0
Middlesbrough	2002–03	Premier League	0	0	0	0	0	0	0	0	0	0
Middlesbrough	2003–04	Premier League	0	0	0	0	0	0	0	0	0	0
Middlesbrough	Total		0	0	0	0	0	0	0	0	0	0
Gateshead (loan)	2001–02	NPL Premier Division	19	0	0	0	—		0	0	19	0
Darlington (loan)	2002–03	Third Division	1	0	0	0	0	0	0	0	1	0
Scunthorpe United (loan)	2003–04	Third Division	10	0	0	0	1	0	1 (Note: Appearance(s) in Football League Trophy)	0	12	0
Darlington	2004–05	League Two	46	0	2	0	1	0	1	0	50	0
Darlington	2005–06	League Two	30	0	1	0	0	0	1	0	32	0
Darlington	2006–07	League Two	31	0	2	0	0	0	2	0	35	0
Darlington	Total		107	0	5	0	1	0	4	0	117	0
Rochdale	2007–08	League Two	15	0	1	0	0	0	1	0	17	0
Rochdale	2008–09	League Two	23	0	3	0	1	0	2	0	29	0
Rochdale	Total		38	0	4	0	1	0	3	0	46	0
Wrexham	2009–10	Conference Premier	18	0	0	0	—		2 (Note: Appearance(s) in FA Trophy)	0	20	0
Darlington	2010–11	Conference Premier	43	0	3	0	—		7	0	53	0
Darlington	2011–12	Conference Premier	22	0	2	0	—		1	0	25	0
Darlington	Total		65	0	5	0	—		8	0	78	0
Forest Green Rovers	2011–12	Conference Premier	18	0	0	0	—		0	0	18	0
Forest Green Rovers	2012–13	Conference Premier	46	0	3	0	—		1	0	50	0
Forest Green Rovers	2013–14	Conference Premier	46	0	1	0	—		4	0	51	0
Forest Green Rovers	2014–15	Conference Premier	34	0	2	0	—		3	0	39	0
Forest Green Rovers	Total		144	0	6	0	—		8	0	158	0
Gateshead	2015–16	National League	44	0	0	0	—		5	0	49	0
Forest Green Rovers	2016–17	National League	46	0	1	0	—		7 (Note: Four appearances in the FA Trophy, three appearances in National League play-offs)	0	54	0
Forest Green Rovers	2017–18	League Two	5	0	0	0	1	0	2 (Note: Appearance(s) in EFL Trophy)	0	8	0
Forest Green Rovers	Total		51	0	1	0	1	0	9	0	62	0
Grimsby Town	2018–19	League Two	5	0	0	0	0	0	3	0	8	0
Grimsby Town	2019–20	League Two	1	0	1	0	0	0	2	0	4	0
Grimsby Town	2020–21	League Two	5	0	0	0	0	0	1	0	6	0
Grimsby Town	Total		11	0	1	0	0	0	6	0	18	0
Career total			508	0	22	0	4	0	46	0	580	0

== Honours ==
Darlington

- FA Trophy: 2010–11
