= Ludvig Öhman =

Swedish footballer

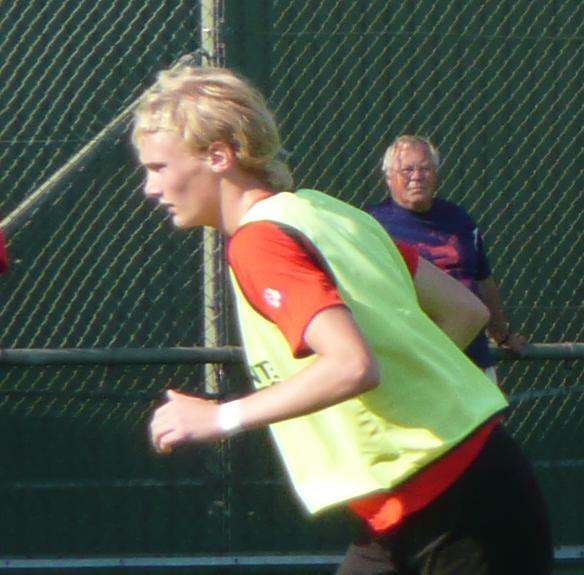

Personal information
- Full name: Carl Ludvig Öhman Silwerfeldt
- Date of birth: 9 October 1991 (age 35)
- Place of birth: Umeå, Sweden
- Positions: Centre-back; right-back

Team information
- Current team: Umeå
- Number: 4

Youth career
- –2007: Sandåkerns SK
- 2007–2009: Kalmar FF

Senior career*
Years	Team	Apps	(Gls)
2010–2015	Kalmar FF	57	(0)
2016	Nagoya Grampus	9	(0)
2017	AFC Eskilstuna	26	(2)
2018	IF Brommapojkarna	21	(0)
2019–2021	Grimsby Town	31	(1)
2021	Falkenbergs FF	16	(0)
2022–2023	Vasalunds IF	55	(7)
2024–	Umeå	28	(0)

International career^{‡}
2007–2008	Sweden U17	8	(0)
2008–2010	Sweden U19	8	(0)
- * Club domestic league appearances and goals as of 16 November 2025 ‡ National team caps and goals as of 10:19, 6 January 2019 (UTC)

Carl Ludvig Öhman Silwerfeldt (born 9 October 1991) is a Swedish footballer who plays as a centre back for Superettan side Umeå.

Öhman has previously played top flight football in both his native Sweden and Japan for Kalmar FF, AFC Eskilstuna, IF Brommapojkarna and Nagoya Grampus. In 2019 he followed former Eskilstuna manager Michael Jolley to English EFL League Two side Grimsby Town where he remained until being released in the summer of 2021.

He is a former Sweden U17 and U19 international and has earned a combined 16 caps.

== Club career ==
=== Kalmar FF ===
Born in Umeå, Sweden, Öhman played at Sandåkerns SK before joining Kalmar in 2007 and progressed through the ranks of the club's youth system. On 20 July 2010, he began his professional career and signed his contract extension with the club, keeping him until 2011. Öhman then made his Kalmar debut in the last game of the season against BK Häcken, but scored an own goal to give the opposition team an equaliser, as they lost 3–1.

Throughout the 2011 season, however, Öhman didn't make an appearance, as he spent most of the season, on the substitute bench and his own injury concerns. As a result, Öhman found his playing time for the club's under–21 team. At the end of the season, Öhman signed a two-year contract extension, keeping him until 2013.

At the start of the 2012 season, Öhman made his first appearance for Kalmar in almost two years, starting the whole game and helped the club keep a clean sheet, in a 1–0 win against GIF Sundsvall in the opening game of the season. However in a match against Malmö on 13 April 2012, he suffered an injury and was substituted in the 29th minute, as Kalmar lost 2–0. But Öhman made his return to the starting line–up against Örebro on 7 May 2012 and helped the club keep a clean sheet, in a 1–0 win. Following this, he found himself, rotating in and out of the starting line–up, which saw him placed on the substitute bench. At the end of the 2012 season, Öhman went on to make twenty–one appearances in all competitions.

At the start of the 2013 season, Öhman appeared in the first four matches to the season before being sidelined for a month with a thigh strain. It wasn't until on 20 June 2013 when he made his return to the starting line–up, in a 2–0 win over Mjällby on 20 June 2013. Following this, Öhman received a handful of first team appearances. He helped Kalmar keep three consecutive clean sheets between 1 September 2013 and 21 September 2013. This was followed up by setting one of the goals, in a 2–1 win over Öster on 24 September 2013. However, Öhman suffered a hip injury that saw him sidelined for the rest of the 2013 season. Despite this, he went on to make twenty-three appearances in all competitions. Following this, Öhman signed a contract with Kalmar, keeping him until 2015. It came after when he was linked with a move to Premier League side Chelsea.

Ahead of the 2014 season, Öhman switched number shirt from thirty to four. However, he missed the start of the season, due to a hip injury. By May, Öhman made a recovery from his injuries and returned to full training. He then played his first match since returning from injury against IFK Göteborg's U21 team on 12 May 2014. Following his return, Öhman played for the reserves for months. However, he suffered a thigh muscle strain injury that saw him out for months. Öhman's first appearance of the season came on 20 August 2014, scoring his first goal for the club, in a 2–1 loss against Kristianstad in the second round of Swedish Cup. Five days later on 25 August 2014, he made his first league appearance of the season, starting the whole game in the left–back position, in a 2–1 win against Gefle. At the end of the 2014 season, Öhman went on to make seven appearances and scoring once in all competitions.

At the start of the 2015 season, Öhman found himself, competing with Nenad Đorđević over the centre-back position. However, he found himself in the substitute bench or playing for the reserve side. Following Emin Nouri's injury, Öhman was given a handful of first team opportunities for the club throughout the rest of the season, rotating in playing either centre-back position and right-back position. Despite missing out, due to suspension and injuries later in the 2015 season, Öhman went on to make twenty-five appearances in all competitions. At the end of the season, Öhman was offered a new contract by the club.

=== Nagoya Grampus ===
On 10 December 2015, Öhman was confirmed, along with compatriot Robin Simović, to be joining Nagoya Grampus for the 2016 J-League season, Upon joining the club, Öhman was given a number three shirt ahead of the new season.

Öhman made his Nagoya Grampus debut in the opening game of the season, starting and playing the whole game, in a 1–0 win over Júbilo Iwata. However, he struggled in the first team place, with Akira Takeuchi and Shun Obu preferred instead. At the end of the 2016 season, making thirteen appearances in all competitions, it was announced that Öhman would be leaving Nagoya Grampus after one season.

=== AFC Eskilstuna ===
After a season in Japan, Öhman returned to Sweden, where he joined newly promoted Allsvenskan side Eskilstuna, signing a two-year contract on 22 January 2017.

Öhman made his debut for the club, starting the whole game, in a 3–1 loss against GIF Sundsvall in the opening game of the season. He started in the next four matches before missing one match, due to suspension. After serving a one match suspension, Öhman returned to the starting line–up against Jönköpings Södra on 7 May 2017 but he received a second bookable offence, in a 1–0 loss. After serving another one match suspension, Öhman became a first team regular for AFC Eskilstuna, playing in the centre–back position. He then scored his first goal for the club, scoring from a header, in what turned out to be a winning goal, in a 2–1 win against his former club, Kalmar, on 15 July 2017. Öhman captained in the next two matches against Kalmar and Djurgården. However, he was unable to help AFC Eskilstuna avoid relegation from Allsvenskan. In a follow–up match, Öhman scored his second goal for the club, scoring a header, in a 1–1 draw against Halmstad on 28 October 2017. At the end of the 2017 season, he went on to make twenty–six appearances and scoring two times in all competitions.

=== IF Brommapojkarna ===
Following Eskilstuna's relegation to the second tier, Öhman transferred to newly promoted IF Brommapojkarna on 26 January 2018, signing a three-year deal with the Allsvenskan club.

He made his debut for the club, starting the match and played 81 minutes before being substituted, in a 2–1 loss against IFK Norrköping in the opening game of the season. Since joining IF Brommapojkarna, Öhman found himself in and out of the starting line–up, establishing himself in the centre–back position. After serving a one match suspension, due to picking up three yellow cards so far this season, he returned to the starting line–up against Dalkurd on 7 July 2018. However, his return was short–lived when Öhman suffered an injury in a follow–up match against IK Sirius and was substituted in the 23rd minute, as IF Brommapojkarna lost 1–0. After missing three matches, he returned to the starting line–up against Örebro on 11 August 2018 and helped the club keep a clean sheet, in a 1–0 win. In the relegation play–offs against AFC Eskilstuna, Öhman played in both legs, including scoring his first goal for IF Brommapojkarna in the second leg, as the club were relegated following a 2–2 draw through away goal. At the end of the 2018 season, he went on to make twenty–four appearances and scoring once in all competitions.

=== Grimsby Town ===
On 8 January 2019, Öhman signed for League Two side Grimsby Town on a 2 1/2-year deal having previously played under Grimsby manager Michael Jolley at Eskilstuna. Upon joining the club, he received an international clearance to allow him to play.

Öhman made his debut for Grimsby Town, coming on as a 70th-minute substitute, in a 2–0 loss against Macclesfield Town on 12 January 2019. In a follow–up match against Lincoln City, he made his first start for the club, losing 1–0. Since joining Grimsby Town, Öhman started in the next six matches, playing in the centre–back position. This lasted until Öhman was sent off for a second bookable offence, in a 1–1 draw against Swindon Town on 23 February 2019. After serving a one match suspension, he returned to the starting line–up against Crawley Town and set up the opening goal of the game, in a 1–1 draw on 9 March 2019. Öhman then made four more starts for Grimsby Town since returning from suspension. However during a 3–0 loss against Oldham Athletic on 30 March 2019, he suffered a hamstring injury and was substituted in the 69th minute. After the match, it was announced that Öhman was sidelined for the rest of the 2018–19 season. At the end of the 2018–19 season, he went on to make thirteen appearances in all competitions.

Ahead of the 2019–20 season, Öhman made a recovery from a hamstring injury and was featured in Grimsby Town's friendly matches. He started the season well by setting up a goal, in a 2–0 win against Morecambe in the opening game of the season. In a follow–up match against Bradford City, Öhman suffered a concussion and was substituted in the 79th minute, as the club drew 1–1. After being sidelined for weeks, he made his return to the starting line–up against Macclesfield Town on 27 August 2019 and started the match, only for the match to be abandoned, due to a heavy rainfall just before half-time left the field waterlogged. In the rescheduled match against Macclesfield Town on 10 September 2019, Öhman started the whole game and played 120 minutes, as Grimsby Town won 5–4 on penalties following a 0–0 draw to advance to the next round. Four days later on 14 September 2019, he scored his first goal for the club, in a 2–2 draw against Oldham Athletic. In a follow–up match against Salford City, he suffered a hamstring injury and was sidelined for a month. But Öhman made his return to the starting line–up against Leyton Orient on 19 October 2019, as the club lost 4–0. However, he spent two months out of the starting line–up, due to his injury concern and strong competitions that saw him placed on the substitute bench. Öhman made his return to the first team, coming on as a 14th-minute substitute for Harry Davis, as Grimsby Town drew 1–1 against Leyton Orient on 11 January 2020. Following this, he found himself in and out of the starting line–up for the next eleven matches. However, the 2019–20 season came to a premature end, due to the COVID-19 pandemic and the club finished fifteenth place. At the end of the 2019–20 season, Öhman went on to make seventeen appearances and scoring once in all competitions.

At the start of the 2020–21 season, Öhman made his first appearance of the season, starting the whole game and helping Grimsby Town beat Harrogate Town 5–4 on penalties following a 2–2 draw in the EFL Trophy match. However, a week later, he was sent–off in the last minute of the game, as the club lost 4–0. After serving a three match suspension, Öhman returned to the starting line–up against Cheltenham Town and set up a goal before suffering a knee injury in the 76th minute, as Grimsby Town won 3–1 on 13 October 2020. After the match, it was announced that the player would be out for a month. It wasn't until on 10 November 2020 when he made his return to the starting line–up against Leicester City U21, as the club lost 3–1 in the EFL Trophy match. Öhman made another appearance in the EFL Trophy match against Hull City on 17 November 2020, as Grimsby Town lost 3–0. Four days later on 21 November 2020, he departed the club by mutual consent.

=== Falkenbergs ===
On 26 July 2021, Öhman signed a contract with Falkenbergs FF until the end of the current season. It was also announced that he had remained on furlough by Grimsby Town until the end of the 2020–21 season and had officially been released the previous month. During the earlier months, Öhman had been training with Umeå FC.

=== Vasalunds IF ===
On 11 March 2022, Öhman signed for Vasalunds IF.

== International career ==
=== Sweden ===
In September 2007, Öhman was called up to the Sweden U16 for the first time. He made his U16 national team debut, starting the whole game, in a 2–0 win against Northern Ireland U16 on 20 September 2007. Öhman went on to make two more appearances for Sweden U16.

In October 2007, Öhman was called up to the Sweden U17 squad for the first time. He made his U17 national team debut, starting a match and played 71 minutes before being substituted, in a 1–1 draw against Germany U17 on 27 October 2007. Öhman went on to make six more appearances for Sweden U17.

In May 2009, Öhman was called up to the Sweden U18 squad for the first time. He made his debut for the U18 national team against Bulgaria U19 on 9 June 2009, starting the whole game, in a 2–0 win. Öhman was later called up to the Sweden U18 squad on two more occasions, playing two more matches.

In February 2010, Öhman was called up to the Sweden U19 squad for the first time. He made his U19 national team debut, starting the whole game, in a 0–0 draw against Czech Republic U19 on 2 March 2010. Öhman went on to make three more appearances for Sweden U19 side.

In February 2011, Öhman was called up to the Sweden U21 for the first time but a toe fracture prevented him from doing so. He was later called up to the U21 national team for the next two years, but did not play.

== Career statistics ==
As of 22 November 2020

Appearances and goals by club, season and competition
Club	Season	League			National cup (Note: Cup competitions include the Svenska Cupen, Emperor's Cup, FA Cup)		League cup (Note: Cup competitions include the J.League Cup, EFL Cup)		Continental		Other		Total	
Club	Season	Division	Apps	Goals	Apps	Goals	Apps	Goals	Apps	Goals	Apps	Goals	Apps	Goals
Kalmar	2010	Allsvenskan	1	0	0	0	—		0	0	0	0	1	0
Kalmar	2011	Allsvenskan	0	0	0	0	—		—		0	0	0	0
Kalmar	2012	Allsvenskan	16	0	1	0	—		4 (Note: Appearance(s) in UEFA Europa League)	0	0	0	21	0
Kalmar	2013	Allsvenskan	15	0	1	0	—		—		0	0	16	0
Kalmar	2014	Allsvenskan	6	0	1	1	—		—		0	0	7	1
Kalmar	2015	Allsvenskan	19	0	1	0	—		—		0	0	20	0
Kalmar	Total		57	0	4	1	—		4	0	0	0	65	1
Nagoya Grampus	2016	J. League 1	9	0	0	0	4	0	—		0	0	13	0
Nagoya Grampus	Total		9	0	0	0	4	0	—		0	0	13	0
AFC Eskilstuna	2017	Allsvenskan	26	2	0	0	—		—		0	0	26	2
AFC Eskilstuna	Total		26	2	0	0	—		—		0	0	26	2
IF Brommapojkarna	2018	Allsvenskan	22	0	0	0	—		—		2 (Note: Two appearances and one goal in the Allsvenskan play-offs)	1	24	1
IF Brommapojkarna	Total		22	0	0	0	—		0	0	2	1	24	1
Grimsby Town	2018–19	League Two	13	0	0	0	0	0	0	0	0	0	13	0
Grimsby Town	2019–20	League Two	15	1	1	0	1	0	0	0	0	0	17	1
Grimsby Town	2020–21	League Two	3	0	0	0	0	0	0	0	3 (Note: Appearance(s) in EFL Trophy)	0	6	0
Grimsby Town	Total		31	1	1	0	1	0	0	0	3	0	36	1
Career total			145	3	5	1	5	0	4	0	5	1	164	5
