= Ollie Battersby =

English footballer

Personal information
- Full name: Oliver Ben Battersby
- Date of birth: 23 July 2001 (age 25)
- Place of birth: Grimsby, England
- Position: Goalkeeper

Team information
- Current team: Cleethorpes Town

Youth career
- 2010–2016: Grimsby Town
- 2016–2017: Sheffield United
- 2017–2018: Grimsby Town

Senior career*
Years	Team	Apps	(Gls)
2018–2023	Grimsby Town	2	(0)
2019	→ Lincoln United (loan)	4	(0)
2020	→ Mickleover Sports (loan)	1	(0)
2020	→ Gateshead (loan)	2	(0)
2021–2022	→ Belper Town (loan)	20	(0)
2022	→ Hereford (loan)	1	(0)
2022–2023	→ Ilkeston Town (loan)	16	(0)
2023–2024	Guiseley	36	(0)
2024	Gainsborough Trinity	0	(0)
2024	FC United of Manchester	1	(0)
2024–	Cleethorpes Town	29	(0)
- * Club domestic league appearances and goals as of 18:05, 22 March 2025 (UTC)

Oliver Ben Battersby (born 23 July 2001) is an English professional footballer who plays as a goalkeeper for Northern Premier League club Cleethorpes Town.

Battersby spent time with Grimsby Town as a youngster before moving to Sheffield United's academy. He returned to Grimsby and signed professional terms in 2018, he has since spent time on loan in non-league with Lincoln United, Mickleover Sports, Gateshead, Belper Town, Hereford and Ilkeston Town.

== Career ==
=== Grimsby Town ===
Battersby began his career with Grimsby Town at the age of nine-years old. In 2016 he signed for Sheffield United's academy but returned to Grimsby's youth team setup the following season and would eventually sign professional terms in 2018.

In August 2019, Battersby signed a one-month loan deal for Lincoln United. In 2020, he signed for Mickleover Sports on loan but suffered a broken hand on his debut and returned to Grimsby the following week.

Grimsby manager Ian Holloway called in live on air to Talksport radio presenter and Billericay Town manager Jamie O'Hara to offer Battersby to the club on a loan following an injury crisis, however the player never ended up moving.

On 10 November 2020, Battersby made his first team debut in a 3–1 defeat at home to Leicester City in the EFL Trophy. On 24 December he signed a short-term loan deal with Gateshead, although he was recalled five-days later following a positive COVID-19 result for first choice goalkeeper James McKeown.

In October 2021, he signed with Belper Town on a three-month loan, impressing manager Grant Black following the end of his stay with Black saying "We would just like to say a massive thanks to Ollie for how he has performed and acquitted himself whilst in loan at Belper from Grimsby Town. He has played a huge part in where we are currently in the table and some saves he has made will live long in the memory. He has been a pleasure to work with and his attitude to improve and technical ability leaves me in no doubt he will go on and have a fantastic professional football career."

In March 2022, Battersby signed for Hereford on an emergency loan deal following a Covid outbreak that had effected both the clubs goalkeepers, he played one game for the club before returning to Grimsby.

Battersby would make his full league debut for Grimsby on 15 May 2022 in a 4–4 draw away at Eastleigh. Grimsby secured promotion with victory in the play-off final, though Battersby was not in the matchday squad at London Stadium.

In the summer of 2022, Battersby signed a new one-year contract. On 27 September 2022, he joined Ilkeston Town on loan until January 2023.

On 9 May 2023, it was announced that Battersby would not be retained for the 2023–24 season and would be leaving the club when his contract expires on 30 June.

=== Non-League ===
On 26 August 2023, Battersby signed for Northern Premier League club Guiseley on a short-term deal to cover for first choice Brad Wade who was absent for personal reasons. Following an impressive start to his Guiseley career during his first five games, Battersby signed an extended contract until the end of the 2023–24 season.

In July 2024, Battersby joined Gainsborough Trinity. By the end of August, Battersby had signed for FC United of Manchester.

Having made 1 appearance for FC United, Battersby returned to North East Lincolnshire by signing for Cleethorpes Town.

== Honours ==
Grimsby Town

- National League play-offs: 2021–22
