= Reece Hall-Johnson =

English footballer

Personal information
- Full name: Reece Anthony Clive Hall-Johnson
- Date of birth: 9 May 1995 (age 31)
- Place of birth: Aylesbury, England
- Height: 5 ft 8 in (1.73 m)
- Position: Right back

Team information
- Current team: King's Lynn Town
- Number: 2

Youth career
- 2007–2014: Norwich City

Senior career*
Years	Team	Apps	(Gls)
2014–2016	Norwich City	0	(0)
2016	Maidstone United	7	(0)
2016	Bishop's Stortford	1	(0)
2016–2017	Braintree Town	25	(5)
2017–2019	Grimsby Town	43	(2)
2017–2018	→ Chester (loan)	11	(1)
2019–2020	Northampton Town	5	(0)
2020–2023	Wrexham	68	(13)
2023–2025	Barnet	40	(4)
2025	→ Solihull Moors (loan)	7	(0)
2025–	King's Lynn Town	38	(9)
- * Club domestic league appearances and goals as of 14:37, 8 November 2026 (UTC)

Reece Anthony Clive Hall-Johnson (born 9 May 1995) is an English footballer who plays as a right back for King's Lynn Town.

Hall-Johnson started his career at Cambridge United academy and joined Norwich City academy at the age of 11. Hall-Johnson was part of the FA Youth Cup winning squad of Norwich in 2013. He made his professional debut in 2014 but was released in 2016. After being released, he had spells at Maidstone United and Bishop's Stortford before securing a move to Braintree Town in October 2016. After trialling since September, Hall-Johnson signed for Grimsby Town in October 2017.

== Career ==
=== Norwich City ===
==== Early career ====
Hall-Johnson was born in Aylesbury and grew up in Cambridge. Hall-Johnson began his career in the youth system at Cambridge United before joining Norwich City at the age of 11. He became an academy scholar in the summer of 2012 and was in the winning FA Youth Cup squad with Norwich in May 2013.

In December 2013, he signed a professional contract until the summer of 2016. He signed another one-year contract on 18 September 2015 with the option of another year. He made his professional debut in Norwich's 3–1 Football League Cup victory against Crawley Town on 26 August 2014. Hall-Johnson was released by Norwich in June 2016 after his contract expired.

=== Maidstone United ===
Hall-Johnson was listed in the squad for Cambridge in a pre-season fixture against St Neots Town 9 July 2016. On 7 August 2016, National League side Maidstone United announced that they had signed Hall-Johnson on a free transfer, after first choice right-back Callum Driver was injured in Maidstone's 1–0 loss away to Aldershot Town the previous week. He subsequently joined National League South side Bishop's Stortford and made one appearance in September 2016.

=== Braintree Town ===
In October 2016, Hall-Johnson moved to his third club of the season, Braintree Town. He was sent off for a two-footed tackle on Frankie Raymond on 2 January 2017 in a 3–0 defeat at Dagenham & Redbridge. During his time at Braintree, he made 25 league appearances with 5 goals and 5 assists.

=== Grimsby Town ===
In September 2017, Hall-Johnson went on trial with EFL League Two side Grimsby Town. He appeared in two reserve games against Hartlepool United on 5 September 2017 and Notts County on 19 September 2017.

On 16 October 2017, he signed for Grimsby on a one-year contract, after impressing manager Russell Slade and assistant Paul Wilkinson on his trial. Hall-Johnson re-joined his former academy manager Paul Wilkinson and fellow players Sam Kelly, Ben Killip and Diallang Jaiyesimi who he played with at Norwich City. Hall-Johnson signed for National League side Chester three days later, on a three-month deal. He made his debut for Chester on 21 October 2017 in a 2–1 defeat at home to Boreham Wood. On 23 October 2017, he scored the second goal for Chester in a 3–2 home victory over Barrow, a volley from the edge of the box. He made eleven appearances and scored one goal for Chester before the loan expired on 9 January 2018. Having returned from his loan spell at Chester, he made his debut on 3 February 2018 for Grimsby in a 1–1 draw against Cheltenham Town.

=== Northampton Town ===
On 17 June 2019, Hall-Johnson joined League Two side Northampton Town on a one-year deal.

=== Wrexham ===
On 24 August 2020, Hall-Johnson joined National League side Wrexham.

=== Barnet ===
On 4 July 2023, Hall-Johnson signed for National League club Barnet. In February 2025, he joined Solihull Moors on a one-month loan deal. After four goals in 47 games in all competitions, Hall-Johnson was released at the end of the 2024–25 season.

=== King's Lynn Town ===
Hall-Johnson joined King's Lynn Town for the 2025–26 season.

== Personal life ==
His cousin is Robert Hall who most recently played for Cheshunt.

== Career statistics ==
As of 12 April 2025

Appearances and goals by club, season and competition
Club	Season	League			FA Cup		League Cup		Other		Total	
Club	Season	Division	Apps	Goals	Apps	Goals	Apps	Goals	Apps	Goals	Apps	Goals
Norwich City	2014–15	Championship	0	0	0	0	1	0	0	0	1	0
Maidstone United	2016–17	National League	7	0	—		—		0	0	7	0
Bishop's Stortford F.C.	2016–17	National League South	1	0	—		—		0	0	1	0
Braintree Town	2016–17	National League	25	5	1	0	—		3 (Note: Appearances in FA Trophy)	0	29	5
Chester (loan)	2017–18	National League	11	1	0	0	—		1	0	12	1
Grimsby Town	2017–18	League Two	12	0	0	0	0	0	0	0	12	0
Grimsby Town	2018–19	League Two	28	0	1	0	0	0	2	0	31	0
Grimsby Town	Total		40	0	1	0	0	0	2	0	43	0
Northampton Town	2019–20	League Two	5	0	0	0	0	0	2 (Note: Appearance(s) in the EFL Trophy.)	0	7	0
Wrexham	2020–21	National League	34	8	1	0	–		0	0	35	8
Wrexham	2021–22	National League	32	5	1	0	–		5	0	38	5
Wrexham	2022–23	National League	2	0	1	0	–		2	1	5	1
Wrexham	Total		68	13	3	0	0	0	7	1	78	14
Barnet	2023–24	National League	35	4	1	0	–		4	0	40	4
Barnet	2024–25	National League	5	0	0	0	–		2	0	7	0
Barnet	Total		40	4	1	0	0	0	6	0	47	4
Solihull Moors (loan)	2024–25	National League	7	0	0	0	–		0	0	7	0
Career total			202	23	6	0	1	0	21	1	230	24

== Honours ==
Norwich City

- FA Youth Cup: 2012–13

Wrexham

- FA Trophy runner-up: 2021–22

Barnet

- National League: 2024–25
