= Sebastian Ring =

Swedish footballer

Personal information
- Full name: Karl Sebastian Ring
- Date of birth: 18 April 1995 (age 31)
- Place of birth: Örebro, Sweden
- Height: 1.78 m (5 ft 10 in)
- Position: Left-back

Team information
- Current team: Niki Volos
- Number: 3

Youth career
- –2012: Adolfsbergs IK
- 2013: Örebro SK

Senior career*
Years	Team	Apps	(Gls)
2013–2018	Örebro SK	68	(2)
2013–2014	→ BK Forward (loan)	33	(3)
2018–2019	Grimsby Town	17	(0)
2020–2022	Kalmar FF	56	(5)
2022	Wisła Kraków	6	(1)
2022–2024	Amiens	43	(0)
2024–2025	Lamia	34	(0)
2025–2026	Omonia Aradippou	27	(0)
2026–	Niki Volos	0	(0)
- * Club domestic league appearances and goals as of 14 June 2026

Karl Sebastian Ring (born 18 April 1995) is a Swedish professional footballer who plays for Super League Greece 2 club Niki Volos as a left-back.

He started his professional career with Örebro SK, spending time on loan with BK Forward before later moving to England with Grimsby Town. He has since played for Kalmar FF and in Poland for Wisla Krakow.

== Career ==
=== Örebro SK ===
Ring started his football career at a young age with local side Adolfsbergs IK. He played for the first team in Division 4, before signing a two-year youth contract with Örebro SK before the 2013 season. The following summer, Ring went on loan to BK Forward for the remainder of the contract and played 33 league games with the side in Division 1. In January 2015, Örebro offered Ring a senior contract, which he accepted.

During the 2015 Allsvenskan season he was an unused substitute for the team, being the second choice behind Logi Valgarðsson in the left-back position. He however made his senior debut in Svenska Cupen, when he started in the 3–0 win against BKV Norrtälje. During the pre-season for the following season, Valgarðsson picked up an injury, which opened a spot for Ring in the starting eleven. He made his Allsvenskan debut in the premier game of 2016 Allsvenskan against Djurgårdens IF. On 23 July 2016, he scored his first Allsvenskan goal in a 3–1 win against Falkenbergs FF.

=== Grimsby Town ===
On 28 December 2018, Ring signed for EFL League Two club Grimsby Town.

On 5 January 2019, Ring was named as a substitute for Grimsby's 1-0 FA Cup defeat against Premier League side Crystal Palace, which was his first involvement with the club. He was joined at Grimsby by fellow countryman Ludvig Öhman on 11 January, Ring stated about joining Grimsby "I wanted to try something new and I hope it will be a great time for me to play in the English leagues with Grimsby. I’m really pleased to play at this high level. I’m very excited to be here and really looking forward to my debut, whenever that will be. I hope it goes well." The following week he made his debut in a League defeat to Macclesfield Town.

On 22 December 2019, just under a year since joining the club, Ring was released by Grimsby via mutual consent having failed to hold down a regular first team place. He played 17 times for The Mariners

=== Kalmar FF ===
Following his release from Grimsby, Ring returned to Sweden and joined Kalmar FF.

In December 2021, it was announced that Kalmar would not be extending Ring's contract and that he would be leaving the club after two years. Ring said "I have had the two best and most fun years of my career here. My family and I have enjoyed ourselves in Kalmar and I have really grown as both a person and a football player. These are incredible memories you bring with you from here with a tough last year with an anxious qualifier where we managed to stay"

=== Wisła Kraków ===
On 18 December 2021, it was announced that Ring had signed for Polish Ekstraklasa side Wisła Kraków on a deal until the end of the 2022–23 season. Following Wisła's relegation, he exercised a release clause in his contract and left the team on 14 June 2022.

=== Amiens ===
On 23 June 2022, Ring signed a two-year contract with Amiens in France.

== Style of play ==
Ring is a technical left-footed offensive player, who is originally a central midfielder but was ordered to play as wing back for Adolfsberg, a position he has played ever since.

== Personal life ==
Sebastian grew up in a sports-oriented family in Örebro, Närke. His older brother Jonathan is a footballer as well, currently playing for Jeju United.

He also played floorball and ice hockey in his youth, until he focused full-time on football.

== Career statistics ==
As of 6 February 2020

Appearances and goals by club, season and competition
Club	Season	League			National Cup		League Cup		Other		Total	
Club	Season	Division	Apps	Goals	Apps	Goals	Apps	Goals	Apps	Goals	Apps	Goals
BK Forward (loan)	2013	Division 1	9	1	0	0	—		—		9	1
BK Forward (loan)	2014	Division 1	24	2	0	0	—		—		24	2
BK Forward (loan)	Total		33	3	0	0	0	0	0	0	33	3
Örebro SK	2015	Allsvenskan	0	0	1	0	—		—		1	0
Örebro SK	2016	Allsvenskan	21	1	4	0	—		—		25	1
Örebro SK	2017	Allsvenskan	22	1	4	0	—		—		26	1
Örebro SK	2018	Allsvenskan	25	0	5	0	—		—		30	0
Örebro SK	Total		68	2	14	0	0	0	0	0	82	2
Grimsby Town	2018–19	League Two	15	0	0	0	—		—		15	0
Grimsby Town	2019–20	League Two	2	0	0	0	1	0	3	0	6	0
Grimsby Town	Total		17	0	0	0	1	0	3	0	21	0
Career total			118	5	14	0	1	0	3	0	136	5
