= 2013–14 Peterborough United F.C. season =

Peterborough United
2013–14 season
- Manager: Darren Ferguson
- Stadium: London Road Stadium
- League One: 6th (Lost in play-off semi-finals)
- FA Cup: Third round
- League Cup: Third round
- League Trophy: Winners
- Top goalscorer: League: Britt Assombalonga (23); All: Britt Assombalonga (33)
- Highest home attendance: 10,026 vs Leyton Orient (L1, 2 Nov 13)
- Lowest home attendance: 3,269 vs Tranmere Rovers (FA, 7 Dec 13)
- Average home league attendance: 5,956
Home colours	Away colours	Third colours

The 2013–14 season was Peterborough United's 54th year in the Football League and their first season in the third division of English football, League One, two years after their relegation from the Championship.

== Squad ==
No.	Name	Position (s)	Nationality	Place of Birth	Date of Birth (Age)	Club caps	Club goals	Int. caps	Int. goals	Signed from	Date signed	Fee	Contract End
Goalkeepers
1	Bobby Olejnik	GK	(Austria)	Vienna	26 November 1986 (age 39)	49	0	–	–	Torquay United	18 June 2012	£300,000	30 June 2015
13	Joe Day	GK	(England)	Brighton	13 August 1990 (age 36)	–	–	–	–	Rushden & Diamonds	31 May 2011	Undisclosed	30 June 2015
29	Alex Lynch	GK	(Wales)	Holyhead	4 April 1995 (age 31)	–	–	–	–	Academy	1 July 2013	Trainee	Undisclosed
30	Charlie Horton	GK	(United States)	London	(age 19)	–	–	–	–	Free agent	25 July 2013	Free	30 June 2016
Defenders
2	Craig Alcock	RB/CB/LB	(England)	Truro	8 December 1987 (age 38)	73	0	–	–	Yeovil Town	7 July 2011	£100,000	30 June 2014
3	Kgosi Ntlhe	LB	(South Africa)	Petoria	21 February 1994 (age 32)	15	0	–	–	Academy	1 July 2011	Trainee	30 June 2015
4	Shaun Brisley	CB	(England)	Macclesfield	6 May 1990 (age 36)	43	0	–	–	Macclesfield Town	8 May 2012	Undisclosed	30 June 2014
5	Jack Baldwin	CB/DM	(England)	Barking	30 June 1993 (age 33)	–	–	–	–	Hartlepool United	31 January 2014	£500,000	30 June 2018
20	Nathaniel Knight-Percival	CB/LB/CM	(England)	Enfield	31 March 1987 (age 39)	33	0	–	–	Wrexham	1 July 2012	Free	30 June 2014
22	Ben Nugent	CB	(England)	Welwyn Garden City	29 November 1992 (age 33)	–	–	–	–	Cardiff City	13 February 2014	Loan	31 May 2014
25	Peter Grant	DF	(Scotland)	Bellshill	11 March 1994 (age 32)	–	–	–	–	Academy	1 July 2013	Trainee	30 June 2017
26	Michael Richens	RB	(England)	Bedford	28 February 1995 (age 31)	–	–	–	–	Academy	19 July 2012	Trainee	30 June 2015
28	Ricardo Santos	CB	(Portugal)	Almada	18 June 1995 (age 31)	–	–	–	–	Free agent	5 February 2014	Free	30 June 2017
31	Mark Little	RB/CB/LB	(England)	Worcester	20 August 1988 (age 38)	125	3	–	–	Free agent	1 August 2013	Free	30 June 2014
Midfielders
6	Michael Bostwick	DM/CB	(England)	Eltham	17 May 1988 (age 38)	42	5	–	–	Stevenage	9 July 2012	Undisclosed	30 June 2015
7	Danny Swanson	CM/LW	(Scotland)	Edinburgh	28 December 1986 (age 39)	30	2	–	–	Dundee United	6 June 2012	Free	30 June 2014
8	Jack Payne	CM	(England)	Gravesend	5 December 1991 (age 34)	14	0	–	–	Gillingham	30 June 2013	Undisclosed	30 June 2017
11	Grant McCann	CM/LM	(Northern Ireland)	Belfast	15 April 1980 (age 46)	130	29	39	4	Scunthorpe United	24 May 2010	Free	30 June 2015
14	Tommy Rowe	LW/LWB	(England)	Manchester	24 September 1988 (age 38)	156	18	–	–	Stockport County	12 May 2009	£225,000	30 June 2014
15	Jermaine Anderson	CM	(England)	London	16 May 1996 (age 30)	1	0	–	–	Academy	1 July 2013	Trainee	30 June 2015
16	Daniel Kearns	RW/CM	(Republic of Ireland)	Belfast	26 August 1991 (age 35)	22	0	–	–	Dundalk	30 August 2011	Undisclosed	30 June 2014
17	Joe Newell	LW/LB	(England)	Tamworth	15 March 1993 (age 33)	50	2	–	–	Academy	1 July 2011	Trainee	30 June 2016
18	Kane Ferdinand	CM	(England)	Newham	2 October 1991 (age 35)	32	1	–	–	Southend United	31 August 2012	£200,000	30 June 2016
19	Nathaniel Mendez-Laing	LW/RW	(England)	Birmingham	15 April 1992 (age 34)	61	8	–	–	Wolverhampton Wanderers	6 July 2012	£100,000	30 June 2015
27	Charlie Coulson	CM	(England)	Kettering	11 January 1996 (age 30)	1	0	–	–	Academy	11 January 2013	Trainee	30 June 2015
32	Tom Conlon	RW	(England)	Stoke-on-Trent	3 February 1996 (age 30)	–	–	–	–	Newcastle Town	5 October 2014	Free	30 June 2014
Forwards
9	Britt Assombalonga	CF	(Democratic Republic of the Congo)	Kinshasa	6 December 1990 (age 35)	–	–	–	–	Watford	31 July 2013	Undisclosed	30 June 2017
12	Kyle Vassell	CF/RW/LW	(England)	Milton Keynes	5 June 1992 (age 34)	–	–	–	–	Bishop's Stortford	11 November 2013	Undisclosed	30 June 2016
21	Nicky Ajose	CF/RW/LW	(England)	Bury	7 October 1991 (age 35)	1	0	–	–	Manchester United	5 July 2011	£300,000	30 June 2014
23	Tyrone Barnett	CF	(England)	Stevenage	28 October 1985 (age 41)	31	5	–	–	Crawley Town	8 May 2012	£1,200,000	30 June 2014
24	Conor Washington	CF	(England)	Chatham	18 May 1992 (age 34)	–	–	–	–	Newport County	28 January 2014	Undisclosed	30 June 2017
36	Josh McQuoid	RW/LW/CF	(Northern Ireland)	Southampton	15 December 1989 (age 36)	–	–	–	–	Bournemouth	11 February 2014	Loan	31 May 2014

=== Statistics ===
As of 2 March 2014

No.	Pos	Nat	Player	Total		League One		FA Cup		League Cup		League Trophy	
No.	Pos	Nat	Player	Apps	Goals	Apps	Goals	Apps	Goals	Apps	Goals	Apps	Goals
1	GK	(Austria) AUT	Bobby Olejnik	41	0	29	0	4	0	3	0	5	0
2	DF	(England) ENG	Craig Alcock	27	0	18+1	0	1	0	3	0	4	0
3	DF	(South Africa) RSA	Kgosi Ntlhe	29	2	17+5	1	3	0	2	0	2	1
4	DF	(England) ENG	Shaun Brisley	24	0	14+2	0	4	0	0	0	4	0
5	DF	(England) ENG	Jack Baldwin	1	0	0+1	0	0	0	0	0	0	0
6	MF	(England) ENG	Michael Bostwick	42	1	31	1	4	0	2	0	5	0
7	MF	(Scotland) SCO	Danny Swanson	37	1	18+8	0	1+2	0	2+1	1	5	0
8	MF	(England) ENG	Jack Payne	33	3	21+3	2	3	0	2+1	1	3	0
9	FW	(Democratic Republic of the Congo) COD	Britt Assombalonga	41	24	29+1	16	4	5	2	1	5	2
11	MF	(Northern Ireland) NIR	Grant McCann	34	6	19+6	4	1+1	0	1+1	0	4+1	2
12	FW	(England) ENG	Kyle Vassell	6	1	2+2	0	0	0	0	0	2	1
13	GK	(England) ENG	Joe Day	3	0	3	0	0	0	0	0	0	0
14	MF	(England) ENG	Tommy Rowe	28	7	22	5	1	1	3	1	2	0
15	MF	(England) ENG	Jermaine Anderson	18	0	8+4	0	3	0	0+1	0	1+1	0
16	MF	(Republic of Ireland) IRL	Daniel Kearns	15	0	5+6	0	1	0	1	0	1+1	0
17	MF	(England) ENG	Joe Newell	12	0	4+2	0	2+1	0	0+1	0	1+1	0
20	MF	(England) ENG	Nathaniel Knight-Percival	18	1	11+1	1	1+1	0	1	0	2+1	0
21	FW	(England) ENG	Nicky Ajose	9	6	9	6	0	0	0	0	0	0
22	DF	(England) ENG	Ben Nugent (on loan from Cardiff City)	3	0	3	0	0	0	0	0	0	0
24	FW	(England) ENG	Conor Washington	4	0	0+4	0	0	0	0	0	0	0
25	DF	(Scotland) SCO	Peter Grant	0	0	0	0	0	0	0	0	0	0
27	MF	(England) ENG	Charlie Coulson	0	0	0	0	0	0	0	0	0	0
28	DF	(Portugal) POR	Ricardo Santos	0	0	0	0	0	0	0	0	0	0
30	GK	(United States) USA	Charlie Horton	0	0	0	0	0	0	0	0	0	0
31	DF	(England) ENG	Mark Little	36	1	22+4	1	4	0	1+1	0	4	0
32	MF	(England) ENG	Tom Conlon	1	0	0	0	0+1	0	0	0	0	0
36	FW	(Northern Ireland) NIR	Josh McQuoid (on loan from Bournemouth)	4	0	0+3	0	0	0	0	0	0+1	0
Players out on loan:
18	MF	(Republic of Ireland) IRL	Kane Ferdinand (at Luton Town)	3	0	0+2	0	0	0	0	0	0+1	0
19	MF	(England) ENG	Nathaniel Mendez-Laing (at Shrewsbury Town)	18	3	2+11	1	0+2	1	0+2	0	0+1	1
23	FW	(England) ENG	Tyrone Barnett (at Bristol City)	25	6	16+5	5	1	0	3	1	0	0
26	DF	(England) ENG	Michael Richens (at Whitehawk)	0	0	0	0	0	0	0	0	0	0
29	GK	(Wales) WAL	Alex Lynch (at Stamford)	0	0	0	0	0	0	0	0	0	0
Players who have left the club:
5	DF	(Democratic Republic of the Congo) COD	Gabriel Zakuani	18	1	14+1	0	0	0	2	1	1	0
10	FW	(England) ENG	Lee Tomlin	25	10	19	5	2	0	3	5	1	0
12	FW	(England) ENG	Paul Taylor (on loan from Ipswich Town)	7	0	6	0	0	0	0	0	1	0
22	FW	(England) ENG	Hogan Ephraim (on loan from QPR)	11	0	6+2	0	1+1	0	0	0	1	0
28	FW	(England) ENG	Jaanai Gordon	2	0	0+1	0	0	0	0+1	0	0	0
36	FW	(England) ENG	Shaun Jeffers	12	3	3+5	1	3	2	0	0	1	0

==== Captains ====
No.	P	Name	Country	No. games	Notes
14	MF	Tommy Rowe	(England)	28	Team captain
11	MF	Grant McCann	(Northern Ireland)	6	

Source: Competitive match reports.
Competitive matches only
Matches started as captain only
Country: FIFA nationality; No.: Squad number; P: Position; Name: Player name; No. Games: Number of games started as captain.

==== Goals record ====
Rank	No.	Po.	Name	League One	FA Cup	League Cup	League Trophy	Total
1	9	FW	Britt Assombalonga	16	5	1	2	24
2	~~10~~	FW	Lee Tomlin	5	0	5	0	10
3	14	MF	Tommy Rowe	5	1	1	0	7
3	23	FW	Tyrone Barnett	6	0	1	0	7
5	11	MF	Grant McCann	4	0	0	2	6
5	21	FW	Nicky Ajose	6	0	0	0	6
7	8	MF	Jack Payne	2	0	1	0	3
7	19	MF	Nathaniel Mendez-Laing	1	1	0	1	3
7	~~36~~	FW	Shaun Jeffers	1	2	0	0	3
10	3	DF	Kgosi Ntlhe	1	0	0	1	2
10	6	MF	Michael Bostwick	2	0	0	0	2
10	Own Goals			0	0	0	2	2
13	~~5~~	DF	Gabriel Zakuani	0	0	1	0	1
13	7	MF	Danny Swanson	0	0	1	0	1
13	12	FW	Kyle Vassell	0	0	0	1	1
13	20	DF	Nathaniel Knight-Percival	1	0	0	0	1
13	~~32~~	DF	Mark Little	1	0	0	0	1
Total				50	9	11	9	79

==== Disciplinary record ====
No.	Pos.	Name	League One		FA Cup		League Cup		League Trophy		Total	
No.	Pos.	Name	Yellow card	Red card	Yellow card	Red card	Yellow card	Red card	Yellow card	Red card	Yellow card	Red card
2	DF	Craig Alcock	2	0	0	0	0	0	0	0	2	0
4	DF	Shaun Brisley	4	1	0	0	0	0	0	0	4	1
~~5~~	DF	Gabriel Zakuani	2	0	0	0	0	0	0	0	2	0
5	DF	Jack Baldwin	1	0	0	0	0	0	0	0	1	0
6	MF	Michael Bostwick	6	0	1	0	0	0	3	0	10	0
7	MF	Danny Swanson	6	0	0	0	1	0	3	0	10	0
8	MF	Jack Payne	2	0	0	0	1	0	0	0	3	0
9	FW	Britt Assombalonga	4	0	1	0	0	0	0	0	5	0
~~10~~	FW	Lee Tomlin	5	3	0	0	0	0	1	0	6	3
11	MF	Grant McCann	4	0	0	0	0	0	0	0	4	0
12	FW	Kyle Vassell	0	0	0	0	0	0	1	0	1	0
14	MF	Tommy Rowe	2	0	0	0	0	0	1	0	3	0
16	MF	Daniel Kearns	1	0	0	0	0	0	0	0	1	0
17	MF	Joe Newell	1	0	0	0	0	0	0	0	1	0
20	DF	Nathaniel Knight-Percival	0	1	1	0	0	0	0	0	1	1
~~22~~	FW	Hogan Ephraim	1	1	1	0	0	0	0	0	2	1
22	DF	Ben Nugent	1	0	0	0	0	0	0	0	1	0
23	FW	Tyrone Barnett	3	0	0	0	0	0	0	0	3	0
31	DF	Mark Little	2	1	0	0	0	0	0	0	2	1
Total			47	7	4	0	2	0	9	0	62	7

Date	Matches Missed	Player	Reason	Opponents Missed
18 November	1	Shaun Brisley	(yellow card) (yellow-red card) vs Walsall	Stevenage
29 December	3	Hogan Ephraim	(red card) vs Carlisle United	Brentford (H)
29 December	1	Lee Tomlin	5× (yellow card)	Brentford (H)
11 January	1	Lee Tomlin	(yellow card) (yellow-red card) vs Swindon Town	Kidderminster (H)
25 January	3	Lee Tomlin	(red card) vs Oldham Athletic	

=== Contracts ===
No.	Pos.	Nat.	Name	Age	Status	Contract length	Expiry date	Source
19	DF	(England)	Mark Little	24	Rejected	Rejected	June 2013	Peterborough Today
11	MF	(Northern Ireland)	Grant McCann	33	Signed	2 years	June 2015	BBC Sport
5	DF	(Democratic Republic of the Congo)	Gabriel Zakuani	26	Rejected	Rejected	June 2014	Sky Sports
14	MF	(England)	Tommy Rowe	24	Rejected	Rejected	June 2014	Peterborough Today

== Transfers ==
=== In ===
No.	Pos.	Nat.	Name	Age	EU	Moving from	Type	Transfer window	Ends	Transfer fee	Source
8	MF	(England)	Jack Payne	21	EU	Gillingham	Transfer	Summer	2017	Undisclosed	
30	GK	(England)	Charlie Horton	18	EU	Free agent	Free Transfer	Summer	2016	Free	
9	FW	(Democratic Republic of the Congo)	Britt Assombalonga	20	EU	Watford	Transfer	Summer	2017	Undisclosed	
32	DF	(England)	Mark Little	24	EU	Free agent	Free Transfer	Summer	2014	Free	
36	FW	(England)	Shaun Jeffers	21	EU	Free agent	Free Transfer		2014	Free	
12	FW	(England)	Kyle Vassell	21	EU	Bishop's Stortford	Transfer		2016	Undisclosed	
24	FW	(England)	Conor Washington	21	EU	Newport County	Player Exchange	Winter	2017	Undisclosed	
5	DF	(England)	Jack Baldwin	20	EU	Hartlepool United	Transfer	Winter	2018	£500,000	
28	DF	(Portugal)	Ricardo Santos	18	EU	Free agent	Free Transfer		2017	Free	

=== Loans in ===
No.	Pos.	Name	Country	Age	Loan club	Started	Ended	Start source	End source
12	FW	Paul Taylor	(England)	25	Ipswich Town	26 September	30 October		
22	FW	Hogan Ephraim	(England)	25	Queens Park Rangers	8 November	29 January		
36	FW	Josh McQuoid	(Northern Ireland) (England)	36	Bournemouth	11 February			
22	DF	Ben Nugent	(England)	33	Cardiff City	13 February	31 May		

Sources: For loan start source see "Start source". For loan end source see "End source".
EU = if holds or not a European Union passport; Country: when 2 flags, 1st flag = country that plays for internationally, 2nd flag = country of birth; No. = number on jersey; P = Position (for position name, pause mouse pointer on abbreviation); Name = Name on jersey (for more extensive name, pause mouse pointer on name); In/Out = In: The player came in on loan, Out: The player went out on loan; Loan club = the club that the player moved on loan to or the club that the player came from on loan; Started = the date when the player's loan started; Ended = the date when the player's loan ended.

=== Out ===
No.	Pos.	Name	Country	Age	Type	Moving to	Transfer window	Transfer fee	Apps	Goals	Source
22	FW	Jonson Clarke-Harris	(England)	18	Transfer	Oldham Athletic	Summer	Undisclosed	0	0	
10	MF	George Boyd	(Scotland) (England)	27	Contract Ended	Hull City	Summer	Free	296	75	
19	DF	Mark Little	(England)	24	Contract Ended	Free agent	Summer	Free	125	3	
34	FW	Dwight Gayle	(England)	22	Transfer	Crystal Palace	Summer	£4,500,000^{1}	29	13	
12	FW	Emile Sinclair	(England)	25	Transfer	Crawley Town	Summer	£100,000	39	13	
28	FW	Jaanai Gordon	(England)	17	Transfer	West Ham United		Undisclosed	6	0	
24	FW	Shaquille McDonald	(England)	17	Contract Terminated	Free agent		Free	0	0	
5	DF	Gabriel Zakuani	(Democratic Republic of the Congo)	27	Transfer	AEL Kalloni (Greece)	Winter	Free	202	6	
36	FW	Shaun Jeffers	(England)	21	Player Exchange	Newport County	Winter	—	13	3	
10	FW	Lee Tomlin	(England)	25	Transfer	Middlesbrough	Winter	Undisclosed	156	43	

EU = if holds or not a European Union passport; Country: when 2 flags, 1st flag = country that plays for internationally, 2nd flag = country of birth; N = number on jersey; P = Position (for position name, pause mouse pointer on abbreviation); Name = Name on jersey (for more extensive name, pause mouse pointer on name); Age = age on the day of the signing; Moving from = only indicate the club the player was playing before start playing for this club in this season, for the type of the moving see Status column; Moving to = only indicates the club the player is going to play next, for the type of the moving see Status column; Ends = when the player's current contract ends; n/a = Not applicable; Apps = Total number of competitive appearances (including substitute appearances) at the club prior to departure; Goals = Total number of competitive goals scored at the club prior to departure.

Notes
Although officially undisclosed The Guardian reported the fee to be in the excess of £4.5 million.

=== Loans out ===
No.	Pos.	Name	Country	Age	Loan club	Started	Ended	Start source	End source
29	GK	Alex Lynch	(Wales)	31	Stamford	3 August			
21	FW	Nicky Ajose	(England)	35	Swindon Town	28 August	20 December		
26	DF	Michael Richens	(England)	19	Nuneaton Town	12 September	8 November		
18	MF	Kane Ferdinand	(England)	21	Northampton Town	31 October	30 November		
26	DF	Michael Richens	(England)	18	Whitehawk	13 December	13 January		
18	MF	Kane Ferdinand	(England)	34	Luton Town	3 January	31 May		
23	FW	Tyrone Barnett	(England)	41	Bristol City	8 January	31 May		
26	DF	Michael Richens	(England)	31	Bishop's Stortford	29 January	31 May		
19	MF	Nathaniel Mendez-Laing	(England)	34	Shrewsbury Town	30 January 2014			

Sources: For loan start source see "Start source". For loan end source see "End source".
EU = if holds or not a European Union passport; Country: when 2 flags, 1st flag = country that plays for internationally, 2nd flag = country of birth; No. = number on jersey; P = Position (for position name, pause mouse pointer on abbreviation); Name = Name on jersey (for more extensive name, pause mouse pointer on name); In/Out = In: The player came in on loan, Out: The player went out on loan; Loan club = the club that the player moved on loan to or the club that the player came from on loan; Started = the date when the player's loan started; Ended = the date when the player's loan ended.

== Pre-season ==
2 July 2013	Shelbourne	1–1	Peterborough United	Drumcondra
19:30	Cronin (?)	Report	Tomlin 22'	Stadium: Tolka Park

3 July 2013	University College Dublin	2–2	Peterborough United	Dún Laoghaire–Rathdown
19:45	Creevy 7'; Clarke 53'	Report	Ajose 72', 90'	Stadium: UCD Bowl

13 July 2013	Peterborough United	1–0	Queens Park Rangers	Peterborough
15:00	Sinclair 86'	Report		Stadium: London Road Stadium

17 July 2013	Mansfield Town	4–2	Peterborough United	Mansfield
19:30	Dempster 15'; Daniel 30'; Clucas 82', 89'		Mendez-Laing 14'; Knight-Percival 68'	Stadium: Field Mill

20 July 2013	Northampton Town	0–1	Peterborough United	Northampton
15:00		Report	Barnett 66'	Stadium: Sixfields Stadium; Attendance: 1,438 (322 Posh fans)

24 July 2013	Peterborough United	1–1	Watford	Peterborough
19:30	Swanson 58'		Deeney 60'	Stadium: London Road Stadium

== Competitions ==
=== League One ===
==== League table ====
Pos	Team	Pld	W	D	L	GF	GA	GD	Pts	Promotion, qualification or relegation
4	Rotherham United (O, P)	46	24	14	8	86	58	+28	86	Qualification for League One play-offs (Note: Four teams play for one spot and promotion to Football League Championship.)
5	Preston North End	46	23	16	7	72	46	+26	85	Qualification for League One play-offs
6	Peterborough United	46	23	5	18	72	58	+14	74	Qualification for League One play-offs
7	Sheffield United	46	18	13	15	48	46	+2	67	
8	Swindon Town	46	19	9	18	63	59	+4	66	

Updated to match(es) played on 3 May 2014. Source: BBC Sport
Rules for classification: 1) Points; 2) Goal difference; 3) Number of goals scored
(O) Play-off winners; (P) Promoted

==== Result summary ====
Overall								Home						Away					
Pld	W	D	L	GF	GA	GD	Pts	W	D	L	GF	GA	GD	W	D	L	GF	GA	GD
32	16	4	12	51	42	+9	52	9	2	4	20	15	+5	7	2	8	31	27	+4

Last updated: 2 March 2014.

==== Result by round ====
Round	1	2	3	4	5	6	7	8	9	10	11	12	13	14	15	16	17	18	19	20	21	22	23	24	25	26	27	28	29	30	31	32	33	34	35	36	37	38	39	40	41	42	43	44	45	46
Ground	H	A	H	A	H	A	A	H	A	H	A	H	H	A	H	A	H	A	H	A	H	A	A	H	A	H	H	A	A	H	A	A														
Result	W	W	W	W	L	D	W	W	W	W	W	W	D	L	L	L	L	L	W	D	W	L	L	L	L	W	W	L	W	D	W	L														
Position	7	2	2	2	3	3	2	2	2	2	2	2	2	3	3	3	3	5	5	5	4	5	5	5	6	6	5	7	6	6	6	6														

Updated to match(es) played on 2 March 2014. Source:
A = Away; H = Home; W = Win; D = Draw; L = Loss

==== Results ====
3 August 2013 1	Peterborough United	1–0	Swindon Town	Peterborough
15:00 BST	Assombalonga 9'	Report		Stadium: London Road Stadium; Attendance: 7,178; Referee: James Linnington

10 August 2013 2	Notts County	2–4	Peterborough United	Nottingham
15:00 BST	Leacock 26'; Arquin 90' (pen.)	Report	30' Rowe; 54' Barnett; 58' (pen.) McCann; 71' Assombalonga	Stadium: Meadow Lane; Attendance: 6,582; Referee: James Duncan

17 August 2013 3	Peterborough United	2–1	Oldham Athletic	Peterborough
15:00 BST	Assombalonga 34'; Tomlin 84' (pen.)	Report	90' MacDonald	Stadium: London Road Stadium; Attendance: 6,184; Referee: Tony Harrington

24 August 2013 4	Tranmere Rovers	0–5	Peterborough United	Tranmere
15:00 BST	Jones (red card) 38'	Report	14' Rowe; 34' Barnett; 38' (pen.) McCann; 59' Assombalonga; 68' Little	Stadium: Prenton Park; Attendance: 4,592; Referee: Jeremy Simpson

31 August 2013 5	Peterborough United	0–2	Crawley Town	Peterborough
15:00 BST		Report	22', 65' Alexander; (yellow card) 31' (yellow-red card) 88' Jones	Stadium: London Road Stadium; Attendance: 6,761; Referee: Darren Bond

7 September 2013 6	Crewe Alexandra	2–2	Peterborough United	Crewe
15:00 BST	Oliver 15'; Leitch-Smith 21'	Report	45' Barnett; 90' Bostwick	Stadium: Alexandra Stadium; Attendance: 4,509; Referee: Lee Collins

14 September 2013 7	Bristol City	0–3	Peterborough United	Bristol
15:00 BST		Report	24' Barnett; 51', 88' Assombalonga	Stadium: Ashton Gate Stadium; Attendance: 11,134; Referee: James Adcock

21 September 2013 8	Peterborough United	2–1	Milton Keynes Dons	Peterborough
15:00 BST	Knight-Percival (red card) 7'; Tomlin 12' (pen.); Assombalonga 34'; Little (red card) 76'	Report	74' McLeod	Stadium: London Road Stadium; Attendance: 8,149; Referee: Darren Drysdale

28 September 2013 9	Rotherham United	0–1	Peterborough United	Rotherham
15:00 BST		Report	51' (pen.) McCann	Stadium: New York Stadium; Attendance: 9,717; Referee: Chris Sarginson

5 October 2013 10	Peterborough United	2–0	Preston North End	Peterborough
15:00 BST	Barnett 9'; McCann 29'	Report		Stadium: London Road; Attendance: 7,020; Referee: Carl Boyeson

12 October 2013 11	Port Vale	0–1	Peterborough United	Stoke-on-Trent
15:00 BST		Report	86' Barnett	Stadium: Vale Park; Attendance: 6,311; Referee: Michael Bull

19 October 2013 12	Peterborough United	1–0	Shrewsbury Town	Peterborough
15:00 BST	Mendez-Laing 64'	Report		Stadium: London Road; Attendance: 6,956; Referee: Eddie Ilderton

22 October 2013 13	Peterborough United	0–0	Sheffield United	Peterborough
19:30 BST		Report		Stadium: London Road; Attendance: 6,435; Referee: Roger East

26 October 2013 14	Colchester United	1–0	Peterborough United	Colchester
15:00 BST	Boone 70'	Report		Stadium: Colchester Community Stadium; Attendance: 4,149; Referee: Stuart Atwell

2 November 2013 15	Peterborough United	1–3	Leyton Orient	Peterborough
15:00 GMT	Rowe 26'	Report	39', 58' Mooney; 49' Cox	Stadium: London Road Stadium; Attendance: 10,026; Referee: Mark Heywood

18 November 2013 16	Walsall	2–0	Peterborough United	Walsall
19:45 GMT	Lalkovic 26'; Sawyers 69'	Report	(yellow card) 51' (yellow-red card) 77' Brisley	Stadium: Bescot Stadium; Attendance: 4,597; Referee: David Coote

23 November 2013 17	Peterborough United	0–1	Stevenage	Peterborough
15:00 GMT		Report	20' Akins; (yellow card) 44' (yellow-red card) 64' Smith	Stadium: London Road Stadium; Attendance: 5,707; Referee: Michael Jones

26 November 2013 18	Brentford	3–2	Peterborough United	London
19:45 GMT	Zakuani 36' (o.g.); Saville 81'; Donaldson 87'	Report	59' Payne; 60' Assombalonga	Stadium: Griffin Park; Attendance: 6,014; Referee: Fred Graham

30 November 2013 19	Peterborough United	1–0	Wolverhampton Wanderers	Peterborough
15:00 GMT	Bostwick 79'	Report		Stadium: London Road Stadium; Attendance: 8,170; Referee: Bobby Madley

14 December 2013 20	Gillingham	2–2	Peterborough United	Gillingham
15:00 GMT	Martin 51'; McDonald 70'	Report	12', 90' Assombalonga	Stadium: Priestfield Stadium; Attendance: 6,949; Referee: Tim Robinson

21 December 2013 21	Peterborough United	2–1	Bradford City	Peterborough
15:00 GMT	Ntlhe 18'; Assombalonga 24'	Report	76' Gray	Stadium: London Road Stadium; Attendance: 6,597; Referee: Mike Russell

26 December 2013 22	Coventry City	4–2	Peterborough United	Northampton
15:00 GMT	Clarke 45', 68'; Moussa 80'; Wilson 90'	Report	21' Jeffers; 45' Tomlin	Stadium: Sixfields Stadium; Attendance: 4,905; Referee: Brendan Malone

29 December 2013 23	Carlisle United	2–1	Peterborough United	Carlisle
15:00 GMT	Amoo 71', 72'	Report	(red card) 62' Ephraim; 61' Tomlin	Stadium: Brunton Park; Attendance: 3,904; Referee: Seb Stockbridge

1 January 2014 24	Peterborough United	1–3	Brentford	Peterborough
15:00 GMT	Payne 33'	Report	16' (pen.) Forshaw; 36' Saunders; 90' Donaldson	Stadium: London Road Stadium; Attendance: 6,343; Referee: Bobby Madley

11 January 2014 25	Swindon Town	2–1	Peterborough United	Swindon
15:00 GMT	Ranger 28'; Kasim 70'	Report	78' Knight-Percival	Stadium: County Ground; Attendance: 7,794; Referee: Mark Heywood

18 January 2014 26	Peterborough United	3–0	Tranmere Rovers	Peterborough
15:00 GMT	Assombalonga 5' (pen.), 87'; Ajose 75'	Report		Stadium: London Road Stadium; Attendance: 5,297; Referee: Gavin Ward

21 January 2014 27	Peterborough United	4–3	Notts County	Peterborough
19:45 GMT	Ajose 30', 74', 85'; Assombalonga 54'	Report	4' Showunmi; 7', (red card) 16' Murray; 76' Grealish	Stadium: London Road Stadium; Attendance: 4,511; Referee: Dean Whitestone

25 January 2014 28	Oldham Athletic	5–4	Peterborough United	Oldham
15:00 GMT	Harkins 48', 89' (pen.); Worrall 54'; Wesolowski 68'; Kusunga 90'	Report	5' Assombalonga; 25' Rowe; 45', (red card) 88' Tomlin; 63' Ajose	Stadium: Boundary Park; Attendance: 3,571; Referee: Richard Clark

8 February 2014 29	Leyton Orient	1–2	Peterborough United	London
15:00 GMT	Mooney 70'	Report	88' Assombalonga; 90' Rowe	Stadium: Brisbane Road; Attendance: 6,717; Referee: Lee Probert

14 February 2014 30	Peterborough United	0–0	Walsall	Peterborough
15:00 GMT		Report		Stadium: London Road Stadium; Attendance: 4,263; Referee: Graham Horwood

22 February 2014 31	Stevenage	0–1	Peterborough United	Stevenage
15:00 GMT		Report	76' Ajose	Stadium: Broadhall Way; Attendance: 4,262; Referee: Oliver Langford

1 March 2014 32	Crawley Town	1–0	Peterborough United	Crawley
15:00 GMT	Tubbs 86' (pen.)	Report		Stadium: Broadfield Stadium; Attendance: 3,663; Referee: Lee Collins

4 March 2014 33	Sheffield United	2–0	Peterborough United	Sheffield
19:30 GMT	Davies 47'; Porter 88'	Report		Stadium: Bramall Lane; Attendance: 16,051; Referee: Nigel Miller

8 March 2014 34	Peterborough United	4–2	Crewe Alexandra	Peterborough
15:00 GMT	Assombalonga 15' (pen.); Ajose 41'; Swanson 60'; Washington 88'	Report	Aneke 13', 58'	Stadium: London Road; Attendance: 5,109; Referee: Gary Sutton

11 March 2014 35	Peterborough United	1–2	Bristol City	Peterborough
19:45 GMT	Bostwick 44'	Report	10', 16' Baldock; (red card) 20' El-Abd	Stadium: London Road; Attendance: 4,352; Referee: Phill Gibbs

15 March 2014 36	Milton Keynes Dons	0–2	Peterborough United	Milton Keynes
15:00 GMT		Report	Assombalonga 58', 60' (pen.)	Stadium: Stadium MK; Attendance: 9,590; Referee: Keith Hill

22 March 2014 37	Peterborough United	0–1	Rotherham United	Peterborough
15:00 GMT		Report	Agard 45+3' (pen.)	Stadium: London Road; Attendance: 6,625; Referee: Carl Berry

25 March 2014 38	Preston North End	3–1	Peterborough United	Preston
19:45 GMT	Kilkenny 45'; Garner 80', 90'	Report	Swanson 18'	Stadium: Deepdale; Attendance: 8,206; Referee: Mark Brown

2 April 2014 39	Peterborough United	2–0	Colchester United	Peterborough
19:45 BST	Rowe 26'; Assombalonga 65'	Report		Stadium: London Road; Attendance: 4,434; Referee: Darren Bond

5 April 2014 40	Wolverhampton Wanderers	2–0	Peterborough United	Wolverhampton
15:00 BST	Batth 48'; Edwards 69'	Report		Stadium: Molineux; Attendance: 23,204; Referee: James Linington

8 April 2014 41	Peterborough United	2–0	Gillingham	Peterborough
19:45 BST	Assombalonga 42'; Rowe 58'	Report		Stadium: London Road; Attendance: 6,543; Referee: Chris Sarginson

12 April 2014 42	Peterborough United	1–0	Coventry City	Peterborough
15:00 BST	Ntlhe 6'; Ajose (yellow card) 45'	Report		Stadium: London Road Stadium; Attendance: 6,617; Referee: Darren Sheldrake

18 April 2014 43	Bradford City	1–0	Peterborough United	Bradford
19:45 BST	Reach 26'; Drury (yellow card) 73'	Report	Brisley (yellow card) 39' (yellow-red card)	Stadium: Valley Parade; Attendance: 13,820; Referee: Andy Haines

21 April 2014 44	Peterborough United	4–1	Carlisle United	Peterborough
15:00 BST	Washington 14'; Assombalonga 55' (pen.), 73' (pen.); Bostwick 90'	Report	Miller 63'	Stadium: London Road Stadium; Attendance: 5,921; Referee: David Phillips

26 April 2014 45	Shrewsbury Town	2–4	Peterborough United	Shrewsbury
15:00 BST	Taylor 6', Bradshaw 45'	Report	Washington 13', 21', Isgrove 28', McQuoid 90'	Stadium: New Meadow; Attendance: 5,619; Referee: Michael Bull

3 May 2014 46	Peterborough United	0–0	Port Vale	Peterborough
15:00 BST		Report		Stadium: London Road Stadium; Attendance: 6,621; Referee: Jeremy Simpson

==== Play-offs ====
10 May 2014	Peterborough United	1–1	Leyton Orient	Peterborough
12:15 BST	Assombalonga 16'	Report	Odubajo 72'	Stadium: London Road; Attendance: 9,519; Referee: Graham Salisbury

13 May 2014	Leyton Orient	2–1 (3–2 agg.)	Peterborough United	London
19:45 BST	Cox 60'; Dagnall 88'	Report	Washington 90+2'	Stadium: Brisbane Road; Attendance: 8,545; Referee: Mick Russell

=== FA Cup ===
9 November 2013 Round 1	Peterborough United	2–0	Exeter City	Peterborough
15:00	Assombalonga 72'; Mendez-Laing 79'	Report		Stadium: London Road Stadium; Attendance: 3,379; Referee: Graham Salisbury

7 December 2013 Round 2	Peterborough United	5–0	Tranmere Rovers	Peterborough
15:00	Assombalonga 38', 64', 73'; Jeffers 45', 90'	Report		Stadium: London Road Stadium; Attendance: 3,269; Referee: Michael Naylor

4 January 2014 Round 3	Kidderminster Harriers	0–0	Peterborough United	Kidderminster
15:00		Report		Stadium: Aggborough; Attendance: 3,858; Referee: Jon Moss

14 January 2014 Round 3 replay	Peterborough United	2–3	Kidderminster Harriers	Peterborough
19:45	Rowe 26'; Assombalonga 74' (pen.)	Report	48' Gash; 52' Byrne; 76' Lolley	Stadium: London Road Stadium; Attendance: 3,483; Referee: Andy D'Urso

=== League Cup ===
6 August 2013 Round 1	Colchester United	1–5	Peterborough United	Colchester
19:45	Ibhre 47'	Report	42' Zakuani; 59' Barnett; 68' Rowe; 71', 80' Tomlin	Stadium: Colchester Communication Stadium; Attendance: 2,368; Referee: Trevor Kettle

27 August 2013 Round 2	Peterborough United	6–0	Reading	Peterborough
19:45	Assombalonga 4'; Tomlin 19', 54' (pen.), 79' (pen.); Swanson 28'; Payne 90+3'	Report		Stadium: London Road Stadium; Attendance: 4,496; Referee: Keith Hill

24 September 2013 Round 3	Sunderland	2–0	Peterborough United	Sunderland
19:45		Report		Stadium: Stadium of Light; Attendance: 18,126; Referee: Naylor

=== League Trophy ===
8 October 2013 Round 2	Peterborough United	2–1	Brentford	Peterborough
19:45	Taylor 18' (o.g.); McCann 70' (pen.)	Report	80' Nugent	Stadium: London Road Stadium; Attendance: 5,261; Referee: Andy Davies

12 November 2013 Round 3	Peterborough United	1–0	Dagenham & Redbridge	Peterborough
19:45	Assombalonga 57'	Report		Stadium: London Road Stadium; Attendance: 4,830; Referee: Mark Heywood

10 December 2013 Area Semi-Finals	Newport County	0–3	Peterborough United	Newport
19:45		Report	13' Ntlhe; 90' McCann; 90' Mendez-Laing	Stadium: Rodney Parade; Attendance: 1,765; Referee: Trevor Kettle

5 February 2014 Area Final Leg 1	Peterborough United	2–2	Swindon Town	Peterborough
19:45	Branco 10' (o.g.); Vassell 14'	Report	31' Rangers; 45' (o.g.) Brisley; (red card) McEveley	Stadium: London Road Stadium; Attendance: 3,312; Referee: Paul Tierney

17 February Area Final Leg 2	Swindon Town	1–1 (3–3 agg.) (3–4 p)	Peterborough United	Swindon
19:45	Pritchard	Report	Assombalonga	Stadium: County Ground; Attendance: 6,825; Referee: Keith Stroud
	Penalties
	Luongo (penalty missed); Yaser Kasim (penalty scored); Pritchard (penalty scored); Archibald-Henville (penalty scored); Reis (penalty missed)		(penalty scored) Assombalonga; (penalty scored) Bostwick; (penalty missed) Swanson; (penalty scored) McCann; (penalty scored) Rowe

30 March 2014 Final	Chesterfield	1–3	Peterborough United	London
	Doyle 53'	Report	McQuoid 7'; Brisley 38'; Assombalonga 78'	Stadium: Wembley Stadium

== Kit ==
Supplier: Nike
Sponsor(s): Stadium Energy

Home	Away	Third

Last updated: 2 June 2013.
Source: Peterborough Today

== Summary ==
Games played	44 (32 League One, 4 FA Cup, 3 League Cup, 5 League Trophy)
Games won	24 (17 League One, 2 FA Cup, 2 League Cup, 3 League Trophy)
Games drawn	7 (4 League One, 1 FA Cup, 0 League Cup, 2 League Trophy)
Games lost	14 (12 League One, 1 FA Cup, 1 League Cup, 0 League Trophy)
Goals scored	80 (51 League One, 9 FA Cup, 11 League Cup, 9 League Trophy)
Goals conceded	51 (41 League One, 3 FA Cup, 3 League Cup, 4 League Trophy)
Goal difference	+29
Clean sheets	18 (12 League One, 3 FA Cup, 1 League Cup, 2 League Trophy)
Yellow cards	62 (47 League One, 4 FA Cup, 2 League Cup, 9 League Trophy)
Red cards	7 (7 League One, 0 FA Cup, 0 League Cup, 0 League Trophy)
Worst discipline	
Best result	6–0 vs Reading
Worst result	2–4 vs Coventry City
Most appearances	13 players (5)
Top scorer	Britt Assombalonga (24 goals)
Points	52
