= 2012–13 Peterborough United F.C. season =

Peterborough United
2012–13 season
- Manager: Darren Ferguson
- Stadium: London Road Stadium
- Championship: 22nd (relegated)
- FA Cup: Third round
- Football League Cup: Second round
- Top goalscorer: League: Dwight Gayle (13); All: Dwight Gayle (13); Lee Tomlin (13)
- Highest home attendance: 13,938 vs Sheffield Wednesday, 27 April
- Lowest home attendance: 3,225 vs Southend United, 14 August
- Average home league attendance: 8,215
Home colours	Away colours	Third colours

The 2012–13 season is Peterborough United's second consecutive season in the Championship.

== Events of the season ==
June

- 11 June – Mark Robson leaves to join Barnet as manager.
- 29 June – Preston North End midfielder Paul Coutts rejects an offer to re-join Peterborough.

July

- 4 July – Gavin Strachan is promoted to first team coach.
- 5 July – Stevenage rejects a joint £1 million bid for Lawrie Wilson and Michael Bostwick.
- 6 July – Defender Gabriel Zakuani is named club captain.

November

- 12 November – Tyrone Barnett, Nathaniel Mendez-Laing, Emile Sinclair and Gabriel Zakuani are placed on the transfer list following a breach of club discipline.

May

- 4 May – Peterborough are relegated back to League One following a 3–2 loss at Crystal Palace.

== Championship data ==
=== League table ===
Pos	Team	Pld	W	D	L	GF	GA	GD	Pts	Promotion or relegation
20	Millwall	46	15	11	20	51	62	−11	56	
21	Barnsley	46	14	13	19	56	70	−14	55	
22	Peterborough United (R)	46	15	9	22	66	75	−9	54	Relegation to Football League One
23	Wolverhampton Wanderers (R)	46	14	9	23	55	69	−14	51	Relegation to Football League One
24	Bristol City (R)	46	11	8	27	59	84	−25	41	Relegation to Football League One

Updated to match(es) played on 4 May 2013. Source: BBC Sport
Rules for classification: 1) points; 2) goal difference; 3) number of goals scored.
(R) Relegated

=== Results summary ===
Overall								Home						Away					
Pld	W	D	L	GF	GA	GD	Pts	W	D	L	GF	GA	GD	W	D	L	GF	GA	GD
46	15	9	22	66	74	−8	54	8	5	10	34	39	−5	7	4	12	32	35	−3

Last updated: 5 May 2013.

== Squad ==
Note: Flags indicate national team as defined under FIFA eligibility rules; some limited exceptions apply. Players may hold more than one non-FIFA nationality.

No.	Pos.	Nation	Player
1	GK	AUT	Bobby Olejnik
3	DF	ENG	Craig Alcock
4	DF	ENG	Shaun Brisley
5	DF	COD	Gabriel Zakuani (Vice Club Captain))
6	MF	ENG	Michael Bostwick
7	MF	SCO	Danny Swanson
8	MF	ENG	Lee Tomlin
9	FW	ENG	Tyrone Barnett
10	MF	SCO	George Boyd (on loan at Hull City)
11	MF	NIR	Grant McCann
12	FW	ENG	Emile Sinclair (on loan at Doncaster Rovers)
13	GK	ENG	Joe Day
14	MF	ENG	Tommy Rowe (Captain))
15	FW	ENG	Dave Hibbert
16	MF	IRL	Daniel Kearns (on loan at Rotherham United)
17	MF	ENG	Joe Newell

No.	Pos.	Nation	Player
18	DF	ENG	Kane Ferdinand
19	DF	ENG	Mark Little
20	DF	ENG	Nathaniel Knight-Percival
21	FW	ENG	Nicky Ajose (on loan at Bury)
22	FW	ENG	Jonson Clarke-Harris (on loan at Bury)
23	MF	ITA	Davide Petrucci (on loan from Manchester United)
24	DF	RSA	Kgosi Ntlhe
25	DF	ENG	Peter Grant
26	MF	ENG	Jack Payne (on loan from Gillingham)
28	FW	ENG	Jaani Gordon-Hutton
30	MF	ENG	Michael Richens
33	MF	ENG	Alex Pritchard (on loan from Tottenham Hotspur)
34	FW	ENG	Dwight Gayle
36	MF	ENG	Charlie Coulson
38	MF	BEL	Florent Cuvelier (on loan from Stoke City)
44	MF	ENG	Nathaniel Mendez-Laing

=== Statistics ===
As of 5 May 2013

No.	Pos	Nat	Player	Total		Championship		FA Cup		League Cup	
No.	Pos	Nat	Player	Apps	Goals	Apps	Goals	Apps	Goals	Apps	Goals
1	GK	(Austria) AUT	Bobby Olejnik	49	0	46	0	1	0	2	0
3	DF	(England) ENG	Craig Alcock	29	0	23+4	0	1	0	1	0
4	DF	(England) ENG	Shaun Brisley	31	0	23+5	0	1	0	2	0
5	DF	(Democratic Republic of the Congo) COD	Gabriel Zakuani	34	1	30+3	1	0	0	1	0
6	MF	(England) ENG	Michael Bostwick	42	5	39	5	1	0	2	0
7	MF	(Scotland) SCO	Danny Swanson	30	2	10+17	2	1	0	1+1	0
8	FW	(England) ENG	Lee Tomlin	44	13	39+3	11	0	0	2	2
9	FW	(England) ENG	Tyrone Barnett	18	1	10+8	1	0	0	0	0
11	MF	(Northern Ireland) NIR	Grant McCann	43	8	28+12	8	0+1	0	1+1	0
13	GK	(England) ENG	Joe Day	0	0	0	0	0	0	0	0
14	MF	(England) ENG	Tommy Rowe	32	5	30+1	5	1	0	0	0
15	FW	(England) ENG	Dave Hibbert	0	0	0	0	0	0	0	0
17	MF	(England) ENG	Joe Newell	33	1	22+8	0	1	0	1+1	1
18	MF	(England) ENG	Kane Ferdinand	32	1	15+16	1	1	0	0	0
19	DF	(England) ENG	Mark Little	44	1	39+2	1	1	0	1+1	0
20	DF	(England) ENG	Nathaniel Knight-Percival	33	0	29+2	0	1	0	1	0
23	MF	(Italy) ITA	Davide Petrucci (on loan from Manchester United)	4	1	4	1	0	0	0	0
24	DF	(South Africa) RSA	Kgosi Ntlhe	15	1	9+4	1	0	0	2	0
25	DF	(England) ENG	Peter Grant	0	0	0	0	0	0	0	0
26	MF	(England) ENG	Jack Payne (on loan from Gillingham)	14	0	11+3	0	0	0	0	0
28	MF	(England) ENG	Jaani Gordon-Hutton	4	0	1+2	0	0+1	0	0	0
32	DF	(England) ENG	Jermaine Anderson	1	0	0+1	0	0	0	0	0
33	MF	(England) ENG	Alex Pritchard (on loan from Tottenham Hotspur)	6	0	2+4	0	0	0	0	0
34	FW	(England) ENG	Dwight Gayle	29	13	28+1	13	0	0	0	0
35	FW	(England) ENG	Regan Carthey	0	0	0	0	0	0	0	0
36	MF	(England) ENG	Charlie Coulson	0	0	0	0	0	0	0	0
38	MF	(Belgium) BEL	Florent Cuvelier (on loan from Stoke City)	1	0	0+1	0	0	0	0	0
44	FW	(England) ENG	Nathaniel Mendez-Laing	21	3	13+8	3	0	0	0	0
	DF	(England) ENG	Scott Griffiths	0	0	0	0	0	0	0	0
Players currently out on loan:
10	MF	(Scotland) SCO	George Boyd (at Hull City)	34	7	30+1	6	1	0	2	1
12	FW	(England) ENG	Emile Sinclair (at Doncaster Rovers)	13	3	5+8	3	0	0	0	0
16	MF	(Republic of Ireland) IRL	Daniel Kearns (at Rotherham United)	1	0	0+1	0	0	0	0	0
21	FW	(England) ENG	Nicky Ajose (at Bury)	1	0	0	0	0+1	0	0	0
22	FW	(England) ENG	Jonson Clarke-Harris (at Bury)	0	0	0	0	0	0	0	0
Players who left during the course of the season:
23	MF	(Republic of Ireland) IRL	Lee Frecklington	6	0	4+1	0	0	0	1	0
26	FW	(England) ENG	Paul Taylor	5	2	2+1	0	0	0	2	2
31	DF	(England) ENG	Scott Wootton (on loan from Manchester United)	2	1	2	1	0	0	0	0
33	MF	(England) ENG	George Thorne (on loan from West Bromwich Albion)	7	1	7	1	0	0	0	0
38	FW	(England) ENG	Saido Berahino (on loan from West Bromwich Albion)	10	2	7+3	2	0	0	0	0

==== Goalscorers ====
Rank	No.	Pos.	Name	Championship	FA Cup	League Trophy	Total
1	8	MF	Lee Tomlin	11	0	2	13
1	34	FW	Dwight Gayle	13	0	0	13
3	11	MF	Grant McCann	8	0	0	8
4	10	MF	George Boyd	6	0	1	7
5	6	MF	Michael Bostwick	5	0	0	5
5	14	MF	Tommy Rowe	5	0	0	5
7	12	FW	Emile Sinclair	3	0	0	3
7	44	FW	Nathaniel Mendez-Laing	3	0	0	3
9	7	MF	Danny Swanson	2	0	0	2
9	26	FW	Paul Taylor	0	0	2	2
9	38	FW	Saido Berahino	2	0	0	2
12	5	DF	Gabriel Zakuani	1	0	0	1
12	9	FW	Tyrone Barnett	1	0	0	1
12	17	MF	Joe Newell	0	0	1	1
12	18	MF	Kane Ferdinand	1	0	0	1
12	19	DF	Mark Little	1	0	0	1
12	23	MF	Davide Petrucci	1	0	0	1
12	24	DF	Kgosi Ntlhe	1	0	0	1
12	31	DF	Scott Wootton	1	0	0	1
12	33	MF	George Thorne	1	0	0	1
Total				64	0	6	70

==== Disciplinary record ====
No.	Pos.	Name	Championship		FA Cup		League Cup		Total	
No.	Pos.	Name	Booked	Sent off (straight red)	Booked	Sent off (straight red)	Booked	Sent off (straight red)	Booked	Sent off (straight red)
1	GK	Bobby Olejnik	1	0	0	0	0	0	1	0
4	DF	Shaun Brisley	1	0	1	0	0	0	2	0
5	DF	Gabriel Zakuani	3	0	0	0	1	0	4	0
6	MF	Michael Bostwick	8	0	1	0	0	0	9	0
7	MF	Danny Swanson	6	0	0	0	1	0	7	0
8	MF	Lee Tomlin	5	1	0	0	0	0	5	1
9	FW	Tyrone Barnett	2	0	0	0	0	0	2	0
10	MF	George Boyd	4	0	0	0	0	0	4	0
11	MF	Grant McCann	5	0	0	0	0	0	5	0
12	FW	Emile Sinclair	2	0	0	0	0	0	2	0
17	MF	Joe Newell	2	0	0	0	0	0	2	0
19	DF	Mark Little	4	0	0	0	0	0	4	0
20	DF	Nathaniel Knight-Percival	5	0	0	0	0	0	5	0
23	MF	Davide Petteruci	1	0	0	0	0	0	1	0
23	MF	Lee Frecklington	1	0	0	0	0	0	1	0
24	DF	Kgosi Ntlhe	2	0	0	0	0	0	2	0
26	FW	Paul Taylor	1	0	0	0	0	0	1	0
34	FW	Dwight Gayle	1	0	0	0	0	0	1	0
44	MF	Nathaniel Mendez-Laing	1	0	0	0	0	0	1	0
Total			55	1	2	0	2	0	59	1

== Transfers ==
=== In ===
No.	Pos.	Nat.	Name	Age	EU	Moving from	Type	Transfer window	Ends	Transfer fee	Source
20	DF	(England)	Nathaniel Knight-Percival	25	EU	Wrexham (Wales)	Free	Summer	2014	Free	
	DF	(England)	Sage	17	EU	Youth system	Promoted	Summer	2014	Youth system	
35	DF	(England)	Charlie Coulson	16	EU	Youth system	Promoted	Summer	2015	Youth system	
9	FW	(England)	Tyrone Barnett	26	EU	Crawley Town	Transfer	Summer	2014	£1,200,000	
4	DF	(England)	Shaun Brisley	22	EU	Macclesfield Town	Transfer	Summer	2014	Undisclosed	
7	MF	(Scotland)	Danny Swanson	25	EU	Dundee United (Scotland)	Free	Summer	2014	Free	
1	GK	(Austria)	Bobby Olejnik	25	EU	Torquay United	Transfer	Summer	2015	£300,000^{1}	
44	FW	(England)	Nathaniel Mendez-Laing	20	EU	Wolverhampton Wanderers	Transfer	Summer	2015	£100,000^{2}	
6	MF	(England)	Michael Bostwick	24	EU	Stevenage	Transfer	Summer	2015	Undisclosed	
	DF	(England)	Richens	17	EU	Youth system	Promoted	Summer	2015	Youth system	
22	FW	(England)	Jonson Clarke-Harris	18	EU	Coventry City	Free	Summer	2014	Free	
18	MF	(England)	Kane Ferdinand	19	EU	Southend United	Transfer	Summer	2016	£200,000	
34	FW	(England)	Dwight Gayle	21	EU	Dagenham & Redbridge	Transfer	Winter	2017	£500,000	

- Total spending: ▼ ~ £2,300,000+

Notes

^{1}Although officially undisclosed, the Peterborough Evening Telegraph reported the fee to be around £300,000.
^{2}Although officially undisclosed, the Express and Star reported the fee to be £100,000.

=== Loans in ===
No.	Pos.	Name	Country	Age	Loan club	Started	Ended	Start source	End source
38	FW	Saido Berahino	(England)	19	West Bromwich Albion	1 October	6 December		
34	FW	Dwight Gayle	(England)	21	Dagenham & Redbridge	20 November	2 January		
33	MF	George Thorne	(England)	19	West Bromwich Albion	21 November	28 December		
23	MF	Davide Petrucci	(Italy)	34	Manchester United	9 January	31 May		
31	DF	Scott Wootton	(England)	21	Manchester United	9 January	5 February		
	MF	Jack Payne	(England)	21	Gillingham	26 January	31 May		
33	MF	Alex Pritchard	(England)	19	Tottenham Hotspur	31 January	31 May		
38	MF	Florent Cuvelier	(Belgium)	20	Stoke City	27 March	31 May		

Sources: For loan start source see "Start source". For loan end source see "End source".
EU = if holds or not a European Union passport; Country: when 2 flags, 1st flag = country that plays for internationally, 2nd flag = country of birth; No. = number on jersey; P = Position (for position name, pause mouse pointer on abbreviation); Name = Name on jersey (for more extensive name, pause mouse pointer on name); In/Out = In: The player came in on loan, Out: The player went out on loan; Loan club = the club that the player moved on loan to or the club that the player came from on loan; Started = the date when the player's loan started; Ended = the date when the player's loan ended.

=== Out ===
No.	Pos.	Name	Country	Age	Type	Moving to	Transfer window	Transfer fee	Apps	Goals	Source
1	GK	Joe Lewis	(England)	24	Out of Contract	Cardiff City (Wales)	Summer	Free	190	0	
28	GK	Paul Jones	(England)	25	Out of Contract	Crawley Town	Summer	Free	41	0	
25	MF	Nathan Ralph	(England)	19	Free Transfer	Yeovil Town	Summer	Free	0	0	
36	MF	Matt Breeze	(England)	19	Contract Terminated	Worcester City	Summer	Free	0	0	None-League 365
9	FW	David Ball	(England)	22	Transfer	Fleetwood Town	Summer	Undisclosed	45	11	
26	FW	Paul Taylor	(England)	24	Transfer	Ipswich Town	Summer	Undisclosed	53	14	
23	MF	Lee Frecklington	(Republic of Ireland) (England)	27	Transfer	Rotherham United	Winter	Undisclosed	102	10	

EU = if holds or not a European Union passport; Country: when 2 flags, 1st flag = country that plays for internationally, 2nd flag = country of birth; N = number on jersey; P = Position (for position name, pause mouse pointer on abbreviation); Name = Name on jersey (for more extensive name, pause mouse pointer on name); Age = age on the day of the signing; Moving from = only indicate the club the player was playing before start playing for this club in this season, for the type of the moving see Status column; Moving to = only indicates the club the player is going to play next, for the type of the moving see Status column; Ends = when the player's current contract ends; n/a = Not applicable; Apps = Total number of competitive appearances (including substitute appearances) at the club prior to departure; Goals = Total number of competitive goals scored at the club prior to departure.

=== Loans out ===
No.	Pos.	Name	Country	Age	Loan club	Started	Ended	Start source	End source
21	FW	Nicky Ajose	(England)	34	Crawley Town	17 August	1 January		
16	MF	Daniel Kearns	(Republic of Ireland) (Northern Ireland)	21	York City	4 October	29 November		
	DF	Scott Griffiths	(England)	40	Plymouth Argyle	9 October	20 November		
22	FW	Jonson Clarke-Harris	(England)	18	Southend United	12 October	12 November		
23	MF	Lee Frecklington	(Republic of Ireland)	27	Rotherham United	19 October	20 November		
44	FW	Nathaniel Mendez-Laing	(England)	34	Portsmouth	15 November			
9	FW	Tyrone Barnett	(England)	27	Ipswich Town	19 November	13 December		
12	FW	Emile Sinclair	(England)	25	Barnsley	20 November	5 January		
23	MF	Lee Frecklington	(Republic of Ireland)	27	Rotherham United	22 November	2 January		
12	FW	Emile Sinclair	(England)	25	Doncaster Rovers	5 January	31 May		
16	MF	Daniel Kearns	(Republic of Ireland)	21	Rotherham United	9 January	31 May		
21	FW	Nicky Ajose	(England)	21	Bury	23 January	31 May		
22	FW	Jonson Clarke-Harris	(England)	18	Bury	15 February	31 May		
10	MF	George Boyd	(Scotland) (England)	27	Hull City	21 February	31 May		

Sources: For loan start source see "Start source". For loan end source see "End source".
EU = if holds or not a European Union passport; Country: when 2 flags, 1st flag = country that plays for internationally, 2nd flag = country of birth; No. = number on jersey; P = Position (for position name, pause mouse pointer on abbreviation); Name = Name on jersey (for more extensive name, pause mouse pointer on name); In/Out = In: The player came in on loan, Out: The player went out on loan; Loan club = the club that the player moved on loan to or the club that the player came from on loan; Started = the date when the player's loan started; Ended = the date when the player's loan ended.

== Fixtures and results ==
=== Pre-season Friendlies ===
21 July 2012	Crawley Town	1–0	Peterborough United	Crawley
15:00	Alexander 14'			Stadium: Broadfield Stadium

25 July 2012	St Neots Town	0–6	Peterborough United	St Neots
19:45			43' Frecklington; 51', 67', 86', 89' Barnett; 79' Richens	Stadium: The Hunts Post Community Stadium; Attendance: 787; Referee: Kevin Wright

28 July 2012	Peterborough United	0–2	Norwich City	Peterborough
15:00			32' Steve Morison; 86' Vaughan	Stadium: London Road Stadium

=== Championship ===
18 August 1	Leicester City	2–0	Peterborough United	Leicester
15:00	Morgan 51'; King 75'			Stadium: King Power Stadium; Attendance: 23,863

21 August 2	Peterborough United	1–2	Millwall	Peterborough
19:45	Boyd 11'		43' Malone; 64' Henderson	Stadium: London Road Stadium; Attendance: 6,188

25 August 3	Peterborough United	1–2	Leeds United	Peterborough
15:00	Bostwick 73'		7', 50' Becchio	Stadium: London Road Stadium; Attendance: 10,432

1 September 4	Birmingham City	1–0	Peterborough United	Birmingham
15:00	Olejnik 29' (o.g.)			Stadium: St Andrew's; Attendance: 14,929

15 September 5	Burnley	5–2	Peterborough United	Burnley
15:00	McCann 7'; Bostwick 39' (o.g.); Austin 74', 81' (pen.); Stanislas 86'		20' (pen.) Tomlin; 23' Mendez-Laing	Stadium: Turf Moor; Attendance: 10,979

18 September 6	Peterborough United	1–2	Bristol City	Peterborough
19:45	Tomlin 90+2' (pen.)		56', 82' Baldock	Stadium: London Road Stadium; Attendance: 5,435

22 September 7	Peterborough United	0–2	Wolverhampton Wanderers	Peterborough
15:00			33' (pen.) Ebanks-Blake 82' Sigurðarson	Stadium: London Road Stadium; Attendance: 9,280

29 September 8	Hull City	1–3	Peterborough United	Kingston upon Hull
15:00	Simpson 61'		24', 29', 73' Sinclair	Stadium: KC Stadium; Attendance: 15,279

2 October 9	Barnsley	0–2	Peterborough United	Barnsley
19:45			4' Boyd; 10' Barnett	Stadium: Oakwell; Attendance: 8,319

6 October 10	Peterborough United	0–1	Nottingham Forest	Peterborough
15:00			51' Reid	Stadium: London Road Stadium; Attendance: 10,469

20 October 11	Watford	1–0	Peterborough United	Watford
15:00	Vydra 90' (pen.)			Stadium: Vicarage Road; Attendance: 15,950

23 October 12	Peterborough United	3–1	Huddersfield	Peterborough
19:45	Boyd 16', 24'; Ntlhe 48'		51' Hammill	Stadium: London Road Stadium; Attendance: 6,348

27 October 13	Peterborough United	3–0	Derby County	Peterborough
15:00	Bostwick 30'; Berahino 86', 90+6'		(yellow card) 66' (yellow-red card) Buxton	Stadium: London Road Stadium; Attendance: 8,427

3 November 14	Sheffield Wednesday	2–1	Peterborough United	Sheffield
15:00	Barkley 46'; Llera 76'		79' Boyd	Stadium: Hillsborough Stadium; Attendance: 22,406

6 November 15	Brighton & Hove Albion	1–0	Peterborough United	Brighton
19:45	Dobbie 90'			Stadium: Amex Stadium; Attendance: 23,706

10 November 16	Peterborough United	1–2	Crystal Palace	Peterborough
15:00	McCann 6'		80' Mortiz; 82' Dikgacoi	Stadium: London Road Stadium; Attendance: 9,691

17 November 17	Peterborough United	1–4	Blackburn Rovers	Peterborough
15:00	Tomlin 88'		3' Formica; 20', 39', 79' Rhodes	Stadium: London Road Stadium; Attendance: 5,997

24 November 18	Ipswich Town	1–1	Peterborough United	Ipswich
15:00				Stadium: Portman Road; Attendance: 16,427

27 November 19	Charlton Athletic	2–0	Peterborough United	London
19:45	Fuller 77'; Kermorgant 85'			Stadium: The Valley; Attendance: 17,377

1 December 20	Peterborough United	1–4	Blackpool	Peterborough
15:00	Gayle 71'		51' Thomas; 58' (pen.), 88' Ince; 83' Dicko	Stadium: London Road Stadium; Attendance: 5,633

8 December 21	Peterborough United	2–3	Middlesbrough	Peterborough
15:00	Gayle 37', 52'		9', 20' Haroun; 76' Miller	Stadium: London road Stadium; Attendance: 6,612

15 December 22	Cardiff City	1–2	Peterborough United	Cardiff
15:00	Gestede 89'		22' Bostwick; 47' Gayle	Stadium: Cardiff City Stadium; Attendance: 26,073

22 December 23	Peterborough United	5–4	Bolton Wanderers	Peterborough
15:00	Tomlin 2'; Gayle 6'; Thorne 47'; Little 67'; Zakuani 83'	Report	45+3' (pen.), 56' (pen.) Andrews; 85' Afobe; 87' Petrov	Stadium: London Road Stadium; Attendance: 6,660

26 December 24	Wolverhampton Wanderers	0–3	Peterborough United	Wolverhampton
15:00			17' Tomlin; 43' Rowe; 69' Gayle	Stadium: Molineux Stadium; Attendance: 23,033

29 December 25	Bristol City	4–2	Peterborough United	Bristol
15:00	Anderson 5'; Baldock 37', 64' (pen.); McManus 59'		(red card) 12' Tomlin; 19' (pen.) McCann; 89' Gayle	Stadium: Ashton Gate Stadium; Attendance: 12,991

1 January 26	Peterborough United	2–1	Barnsley	Peterborough
15:00	Bostwick 28'; Rowe 87'		79' Harewood	Stadium: London Road Stadium; Attendance: 7,339

12 January 27	Nottingham Forest	2–1	Peterborough United	Nottingham
15:00	Halford 28'; Ward 83'		60' Wootton	Stadium: City Ground; Attendance: 22,777

19 January 28	Peterborough United	1–1	Hull City	Peterborough
15:00	McCann 79' (pen.)		33' (o.g.) Newell	Stadium: London Road Stadium; Attendance: 6,214

2 February 29	Peterborough United	2–2	Burnley	Peterborough
15:00	Rowe 65', 69'		1' Austin; 85' Paterson	Stadium: London Road Stadium; Attendance: 6,648

9 February 30	Peterborough United	2–1	Leicester City	Peterborough
15:00	Petrucci 74'; McCann 88'		52' Marshall	Stadium: London Road Stadium; Attendance: 11,070

19 February 31	Millwall	1–5	Peterborough United	London
19:45	Henry 13'; Lowry (yellow card) 18' (yellow-red card) 69'		7', 55' Tomlin; 32' Rowe; 59' Mendez-Laing; 88' Boyd	Stadium: The Den; Attendance: 8,769

23 February 32	Peterborough United	0–2	Birmingham City	Peterborough
15:00			34' Žigić; 80' Burke	Stadium: London Road Stadium; Attendance: 8,350

26 February 33	Bolton Wanderers	1–0	Peterborough United	Bolton
19:45	Dawson 5'			Stadium: Reebok Stadium; Attendance: 15,675

2 March 34	Blackburn Rovers	2–3	Peterborough United	Blackburn
15:00	Rhodes 73'; Jones 90'		11', 14', 27' Gayle	Stadium: Ewood Park; Attendance: 13,192

6 March 35	Peterborough United	2–2	Charlton Athletic	Peterborough
19:45	Swanson 24'; Bostwick 71'		55' Jackson; 59' Haynes	Stadium: London Road Stadium; Attendance: 6,050

9 March 36	Peterborough United	0–0	Ipswich Town	Peterborough
15:00				Stadium: London Road Stadium; Attendance: 9,367

12 March 37	Leeds United	1–1	Peterborough United	Leeds
19:45	Byram 57'		15' Gayle	Stadium: Elland Road; Attendance: 24,240

16 March 38	Blackpool	0–1	Peterborough United	Blackpool
15:00			45' Ferdinand	Stadium: Bloomfield Road; Attendance: 13,037

30 March 39	Peterborough United	2–1	Cardiff City	Peterborough
15:00	McCann 72' (pen.), 79' (pen.)		23' Gunnarsson	Stadium: London Road Stadium; Attendance: 9,236

2 April 40	Middlesbrough	0–0	Peterborough United	Middlesbrough
19:45				Stadium: Riverside Stadium; Attendance: 13,683

6 April 41	Huddersfield Town	2–2	Peterborough United	Huddersfield
15:00	Danns 41'; Wallace 69'		50' Tomlin; 86' Gayle	Stadium: Glapharam Stadium; Attendance: 11,840

13 April 42	Peterborough United	3–2	Watford	Peterborough
15:00	Swanson 29'; Gayle 61'; Tomlin 67'		(red card) 65' Cassetti; 85' Yeates; 90' Forestieri	Stadium: London Road Stadium; Attendance: 10,848

16 April 43	Peterborough United	0–0	Brighton & Hove Albion	Peterborough
19:45				Stadium: London Road Stadium; Attendance: 8,780

20 April 44	Derby County	3–1	Peterborough United	Derby
15:00	Bryson 41'; Martin 50'; Keogh 52'; Fielding (red card) 62'		64' (pen.) McCann	Stadium: Pride Park Stadium; Attendance: 23,753

27 April 45	Peterborough United	1–0	Sheffield Wednesday	Peterborough
15:00	McCann 64'			Stadium: London Road Stadium; Attendance: 13,938

4 May 46	Crystal Palace	3–2	Peterborough United	London
12:45	Murray 45' (pen.); K Phillips 83'; Jedinak 89'		28' Tomlin; 63' Mendez-Laing	Stadium: Selhurst Park; Attendance: 22,154

=== FA Cup ===
5 January Round 3	Peterborough United	0–3	Norwich City	Peterborough
15:00			30' E Bennett; 41' Jackson; 70' Snodgrass	Stadium: London Road Stadium; Attendance: 13,198

=== League Cup ===
14 August Round 1	Peterborough United	4–0	Southend United	Peterborough
19:45	Tomlin 12'; Taylor 28'; Newell 29'; Boyd 58'			Stadium: London Road Stadium; Attendance: 3,225

28 August Round 2	Reading	3–2	Peterborough United	Reading
19:45	Pogrebnyak 16'; Gunter 19'; Knight-Percival 38' (o.g.)		12' Taylor; 17' Tomlin	Stadium: Madejski Stadium; Attendance: 7,262
