= Michael Bostwick =

English footballer (born 1988)

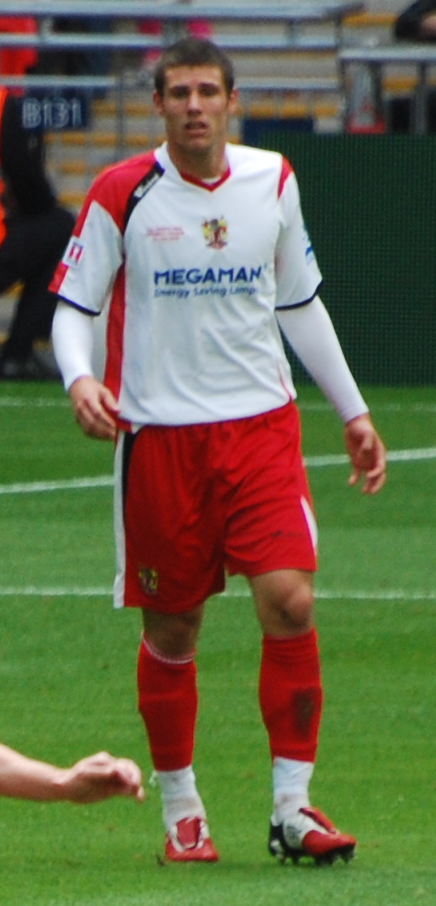
- Bostwick playing for Stevenage Borough in the 2009 FA Trophy final

Personal information
- Full name: Michael Paul Trevor Bostwick
- Date of birth: 17 May 1988 (age 38)
- Place of birth: Eltham, England
- Height: 6 ft 4 in (1.93 m)
- Positions: Centre-back; central midfielder

Team information
- Current team: Bourne Town

Youth career
- –2005: Millwall

Senior career*
Years	Team	Apps	(Gls)
2005–2007	Millwall	0	(0)
2006	→ Crawley Town (loan)	8	(3)
2006–2007	→ Crawley Town (loan)	24	(2)
2007	Rushden & Diamonds	8	(0)
2007–2008	Ebbsfleet United	43	(4)
2008–2012	Stevenage	165	(18)
2012–2017	Peterborough United	193	(23)
2017–2020	Lincoln City	107	(9)
2020–2022	Burton Albion	38	(2)
2022	→ Stevenage (loan)	14	(0)
2022–2023	Stevenage	30	(0)
2023–2025	Boston United	61	(1)
2025–2026	St Albans City	25	(5)
2026–	Bourne Town	2	(0)

International career
2008	England C	1	(0)

Managerial career
- 2025: St Albans City (interim)
- * Club domestic league appearances and goals as of 09:26, 21 August 2026 (UTC)

Michael Paul Trevor Bostwick (born 17 May 1988) is an English professional footballer who plays as a centre-back for Northern Premier League Division One Midlands club Bourne Town.

Bostwick began his professional football career at Millwall, progressing through the youth academy, and had two spells on loan at Conference National club Crawley Town. He joined Rushden & Diamonds on an 18-month contract in January 2007, before moving to Ebbsfleet United later that year, helping them win the FA Trophy at Wembley Stadium in May 2008. Later that month, Bostwick signed for Stevenage Borough, where he scored 21 goals in 206 appearances across a four-year spell, helping the club win the FA Trophy in 2009 and achieve back-to-back promotions from the Conference Premier to League One.

In July 2012, Bostwick joined Championship club Peterborough United for an undisclosed fee, making 228 appearances and winning the Football League Trophy in March 2014. He signed for Lincoln City in July 2017, adding the EFL Trophy to his honours in April 2018 before being named the club's Player of the Year as they won the League Two title in the 2018–19 season. After two seasons at Burton Albion, Bostwick returned to Stevenage in January 2022, contributing to the club's promotion to League One during the 2022–23 season. He joined Boston United in June 2023, achieving promotion via the 2024 National League North play-offs. After spending the 2025–26 season at St Albans City, Bostwick joined Bourne Town in May 2026.

== Early life ==
Bostwick was born in Eltham, Greater London, and grew up in South East London. A supporter of West Ham United, he cited Rio Ferdinand as his footballing hero during his youth.

== Club career ==
=== Millwall ===
Bostwick began his career as a trainee at Millwall, playing regularly in the club's under-18 and reserve teams. In the latter stages of the 2005–06 season, Bostwick joined Conference National club Crawley Town on a work experience loan, making his debut as an 89th-minute substitute in a 1–0 win against Forest Green Rovers on 18 March 2006. He made his first start on 15 April 2006, scoring in a 2–0 victory over Aldershot Town, and finished the spell with eight appearances and three goals. He returned to Millwall in May 2006 and signed a one-year professional contract.

Shortly before the 2006–07 season, Bostwick returned to Crawley on loan. He played in the first five matches, scoring twice from midfield in a 3–2 win at Stevenage Borough on 18 August 2006. The loan was extended until the end of the season, with Millwall retaining the option to recall him. Bostwick made 25 appearances and scored twice before being recalled by Millwall in January 2007.

=== Rushden & Diamonds ===
Having made no first-team appearances for Millwall, Bostwick joined Conference National club Rushden & Diamonds on an 18-month contract. Managed by Graham Westley, who had previously written about Bostwick's credentials in his weekly column in The Non-League Paper, he made his debut in a 2–1 away victory at league leaders Dagenham & Redbridge on 10 February 2007. Bostwick was sent off for the first time in his career in a 2–2 draw with Aldershot Town on 24 March 2007, following two bookable offences. He made eight appearances for Rushden before falling out of favour following Westley's departure in February 2007 and was released by the club at the end of the season.

=== Ebbsfleet United ===
At the start of the 2007–08 season, Bostwick joined Conference Premier club Ebbsfleet United on an initial three-month contract, with the option of an extension. Signed to provide depth and cover in defence and midfield, he made his debut on 18 August 2007 in a 1–0 away victory at former club Rushden & Diamonds. He scored his first goal in a 1–1 draw with Exeter City on 22 September 2007. Bostwick signed a contract extension on 23 November 2007, keeping him at the club until the end of the season. He made seven appearances in Ebbsfleet's FA Trophy run that season, scoring in a 1–1 draw against Aldershot Town in the semi-final second leg on 15 March 2008 and played the full match in the 1–0 final victory over Torquay United at Wembley Stadium on 10 May 2008. Across all competitions, he made 51 appearances and scored five goals during the season.

=== Stevenage ===
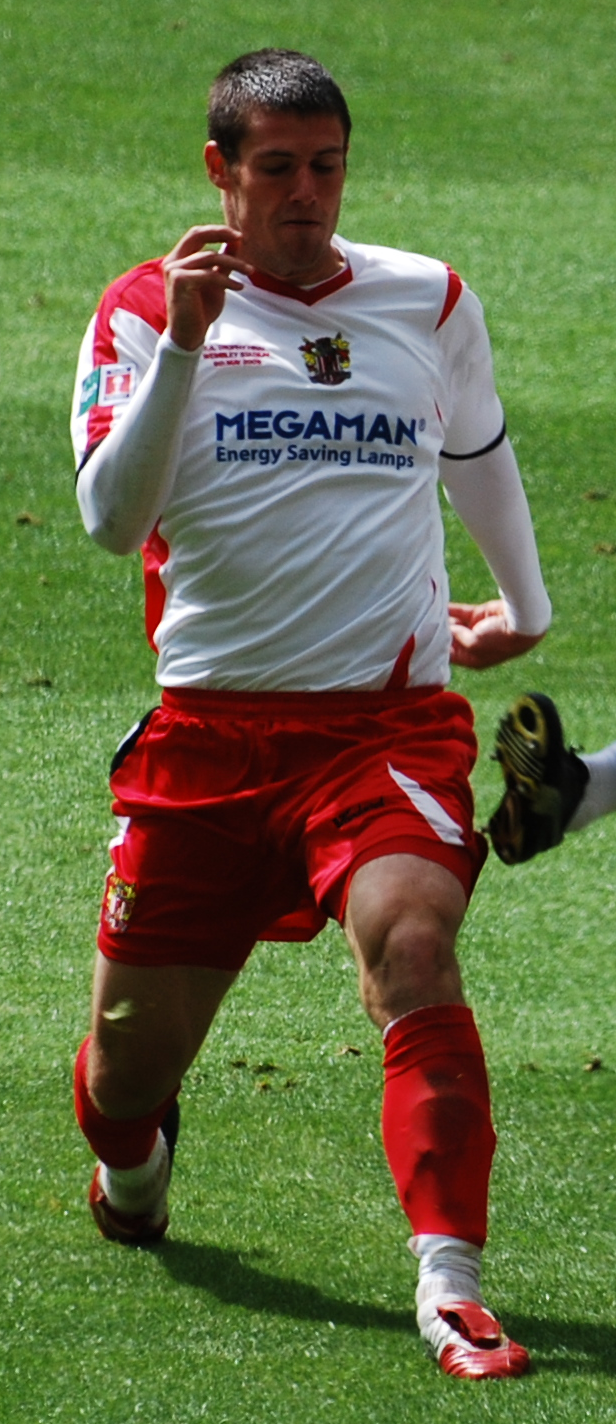
Bostwick playing for Stevenage Borough in the 2009 FA Trophy final

Bostwick was offered a new contract by Ebbsfleet ahead of the 2008–09 season, but rejected the offer, opting to join fellow Conference Premier club Stevenage Borough on a two-year deal on 21 May 2008, reuniting with manager Graham Westley. He made his debut in the club's opening match of the season, a 5–0 defeat to Wrexham at the Racecourse Ground on 9 August 2008. He scored his first goal for Stevenage on 7 October 2008, an 80th-minute winner in a 3–2 victory over Mansfield Town. Bostwick played in all seven of the club's FA Trophy matches that season, including the full 90 minutes in the 2–0 final victory against York City at Wembley Stadium on 9 May 2009, securing consecutive FA Trophy wins in his career having also won the competition at Ebbsfleet the previous year. He finished his first season at Stevenage with 49 appearances and three goals.

Bostwick scored his first goal of the 2009–10 season in a 2–1 victory against Rushden & Diamonds at Broadhall Way on 29 August 2009. He also scored in a 1–0 away victory at Chester City on 19 September 2009, although the result and goal were later expunged following Chester's expulsion from the league. Bostwick featured in the 2–0 victory against Kidderminster Harriers on 17 April 2010 that secured Stevenage's promotion to the Football League for the first time in the club's history. He made five appearances in the club's FA Trophy run, including in the final where Stevenage were defeated 2–1 by Barrow after extra time. Bostwick made 52 appearances in all competitions that season, scoring eight goals. Out of contract at the season's end, Westley stated it would be "very difficult" to retain him, but Bostwick signed a new two-year deal on 10 June 2010 amid interest from several League One clubs.

He made his Football League debut in Stevenage's opening match of the 2010–11 season, a 2–2 draw with Macclesfield Town on 7 August 2010. He scored his first goal of the season in the club's first Football League victory on 21 August 2010, a 3–1 win against Stockport County, doubling the lead with a 30-yard strike. His second came in a 3–1 FA Cup win over Premier League club Newcastle United on 8 January 2011, scoring from 25 yards to put Stevenage two goals ahead. Bostwick made 51 appearances in all competitions, scoring three goals, including three appearances in the League Two play-offs. Stevenage secured promotion to League One with a 1–0 win over Torquay United at Old Trafford on 28 May 2011, in which Bostwick played the full match.

He signed a two-year contract extension on 26 August 2011, and scored eight goals from midfield in 53 appearances during the 2011–12 season as Stevenage were beaten 1–0 over two legs by Sheffield United in the League One play-off semi-finals. Over four seasons with the club, Bostwick made 206 appearances in all competitions, scoring 21 goals.

=== Peterborough United ===
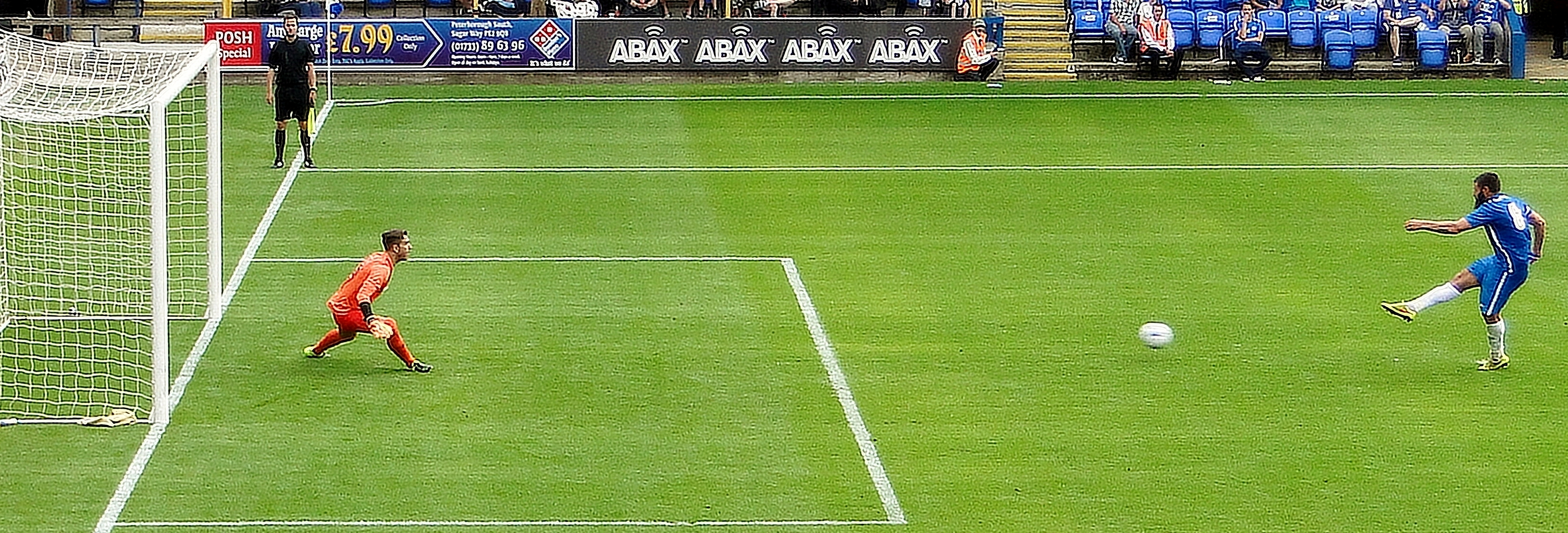
Bostwick scores Peterborough United's third goal in their friendly with West Ham United on 11 July 2015

Bostwick signed for Championship club Peterborough United on a three-year contract on 9 July 2012, for an undisclosed fee. Chairman Darragh MacAnthony stated he was manager Darren Ferguson's "number one transfer target for the summer". He made his Peterborough debut in a 4–0 home victory against Southend United in the League Cup on 14 August 2012, and scored his first goal in a 2–1 home defeat to Leeds United on 25 August 2012. Appointed captain ahead of a home match against Derby County on 27 October 2012, he opened the scoring with a volley in a 3–0 victory. Bostwick made 42 appearances in his first season, scoring five goals, as Peterborough were relegated from the Championship. In the 2013–14 season, he moved from central midfield to a regular role at centre-back, making 57 appearances in all competitions and scoring four goals. This included six matches in the Football League Trophy as Peterborough won the competition; Bostwick played the full match in the final, a 3–1 victory against Chesterfield at Wembley Stadium on 30 March 2014.

Bostwick signed a new three-and-a-half-year contract with Peterborough on 10 March 2015, with MacAnthony stating he could return to his midfield role as "you can see what he brings to that position". He scored seven times in 41 matches during the 2014–15 season. Having been a regular under Ferguson for two seasons, Bostwick continued under new manager Graham Westley during the 2015–16 season, who had previously managed Bostwick at Rushden & Diamonds and Stevenage. He made 43 appearances and scored four goals as Peterborough finished 13th in League One. In the 2016–17 season, under Grant McCann, he scored three goals in 45 appearances and was named the club's Player of the Year at the end-of-season awards. During his five years at Peterborough, he made 228 appearances in all competitions, scoring 23 goals.

=== Lincoln City ===
Bostwick signed for newly promoted League Two club Lincoln City on a two-year contract on 20 July 2017 for an undisclosed fee, turning down a higher offer from Blackburn Rovers as he did not want to relocate to the north of England. He made his debut in a 2–2 draw away at Wycombe Wanderers on 5 August 2017, and scored his first goal in a 2–1 victory against Chesterfield at Sincil Bank on 7 October 2017. He made seven appearances in Lincoln's EFL Trophy run that season, culminating in a 1–0 victory against Shrewsbury Town in the 2018 EFL Trophy final at Wembley Stadium on 8 April 2018. It was his second EFL Trophy triumph and his fourth cup success at Wembley Stadium. He finished the season with six goals in 51 appearances, helping the defence keep 17 clean sheets, and was named in the 2017–18 EFL League Two Team of the Season. He signed a one-year contract extension on 26 April 2018, keeping him at the club until June 2020.

In the 2018–19 season, Bostwick scored in Lincoln's FA Cup third round 2–1 defeat to Premier League club Everton on 5 January 2019. Deployed regularly at centre-back under manager Danny Cowley, he made 49 appearances as Lincoln won the League Two title and promotion to League One. Bostwick was named the club's Player of the Year at the end of the season. He began the 2019–20 season as a first-team regular before sustaining a calf injury in a 1–0 home defeat to Bristol Rovers on 14 September 2019, forcing him off at half-time. He returned in December, but suffered a recurrence of the injury in a 3–1 defeat at Sunderland on 4 January 2020. After another comeback the following month, the season was curtailed in March 2020 due to the COVID-19 pandemic. Bostwick was released at the end of his contract in May 2020.

=== Burton Albion ===
Bostwick signed for League One club Burton Albion on 5 August 2020, on a one-year contract, the move coming after discussions with former teammate and Burton fitness coach Chris Beardsley. He was limited to five league appearances from the substitutes' bench in the opening three months of the 2020–21 season, before establishing himself under new manager Jimmy Floyd Hasselbaink from December 2020. He scored his first goal for Burton in a 2–0 away victory against Northampton Town on 13 February 2021, converting from an indirect free-kick inside the penalty area. Bostwick made 31 appearances during the season, scoring twice, as Burton finished 16th in League One having spent most of the season in the relegation places. Described by the club as "influential" and "key" during the second half of the season, he signed a one-year contract extension in July 2021.

=== Return to Stevenage ===
Having made 10 appearances for Burton throughout the first half of the 2021–22 season, during which he sustained a hamstring injury, Bostwick rejoined League Two club Stevenage on 4 January 2022 on loan for the remainder of the season. He played 14 times as the club secured safety with three matches to spare. Following his release from Burton on 9 May 2022, he signed for Stevenage permanently on 23 May 2022. Bostwick made 37 appearances during the 2022–23 season as Stevenage finished second in League Two to win promotion to League One, leaving at the end of the season when his contract expired.

=== Boston United ===
Bostwick joined National League North club Boston United on 6 June 2023. Appointed club captain by manager Ian Culverhouse, he played regularly at centre-back throughout the 2023–24 season and scored his only goal in a 3–1 victory away to Curzon Ashton on 7 October 2023. He made 48 appearances in his debut season as Boston finished sixth and secured promotion to the National League via the play-offs. Bostwick played in all three play-off matches, scoring in the penalty shoot-outs in both the quarter-final and semi-final ties. Having made 17 appearances during the opening three months of the 2024–25 season, he sustained ankle ligament damage that ruled him out for the remainder of the season. He was released by the club in May 2025.

=== St Albans City and Bourne Town ===
Bostwick joined Isthmian League Premier Division club St Albans City on 5 June 2025, reuniting with manager Ian Culverhouse, who had previously signed him for Boston United. Following Culverhouse's departure, Bostwick was appointed player-interim manager on 29 October 2025. He took charge of four matches before Gary McCann was appointed manager on 13 November 2025. Bostwick scored five goals in 31 appearances as St Albans finished 11th, although he did not feature after February 2026.

In May 2026, Bostwick joined Northern Premier League Division One Midlands club Bourne Town.

== International career ==
Bostwick was called up to play for the England C team, who represent England at non-League level, for a match against Italy C in Benevento in November 2008. He came on as a 56th-minute substitute in a 2–2 draw. He received another call-up for a match against Belgium under-23s at the Kassam Stadium in May 2009, but withdrew due to injury. Bostwick was selected again to face Poland under-23s in Grodzisk Wielkopolski on 20 October 2009, withdrawing again through injury.

== Style of play ==
Initially deployed as a central midfielder, Bostwick has alternated between midfield and centre-back throughout his career, increasingly utilised as a central defender towards the latter stages of his career. He has been described as a tough-tackling player, strong in the air and a powerful striker of the ball, with a reputation for scoring long-range goals.

== Personal life ==
With his first partner, Bostwick had two children, a daughter and a son. With his current wife, he has one daughter.

== Career statistics ==
As of match played 18 August 2026

Appearances and goals by club, season and competition
Club	Season	League			FA Cup		League Cup		Other		Total	
Club	Season	Division	Apps	Goals	Apps	Goals	Apps	Goals	Apps	Goals	Apps	Goals
Millwall	2005–06	Championship	0	0	0	0	0	0	—		0	0
Millwall	2006–07	League One	0	0	—		—		—		0	0
Millwall	Total		0	0	0	0	0	0	0	0	0	0
Crawley Town (loan)	2005–06	Conference National	8	3	—		—		—		8	3
Crawley Town (loan)	2006–07	Conference National	24	2	1	1	—		1 (Note: Appearance(s) in FA Trophy)	0	26	3
Crawley Town (loan)	Total		32	5	1	1	0	0	1	0	34	6
Rushden & Diamonds	2006–07	Conference National	8	0	—		—		—		8	0
Ebbsfleet United	2007–08	Conference Premier	43	4	0	0	—		10 (Note: Eight appearances and one goal in FA Trophy; two appearances in Conference League Cup)	1	53	5
Stevenage	2008–09	Conference Premier	39	3	3	0	—		10 (Note: Two appearances in Conference League Cup; six appearances in FA Trophy; two appearances in 2009 Conference Premier play-offs)	0	52	3
Stevenage	2009–10	Conference Premier	42	6	3	0	—		5	1	50	7
Stevenage	2010–11	League Two	41	2	5	1	1	0	4 (Note: One appearance in Football League Trophy, three appearances in 2011 League Two play-offs)	0	51	3
Stevenage	2011–12	League One	43	7	6	0	1	1	3 (Note: One appearance in Football League Trophy; two appearances in 2012 League One play-offs)	0	53	8
Stevenage	Total		165	18	17	1	2	1	22	1	206	21
Peterborough United	2012–13	Championship	39	5	1	0	2	0	—		42	5
Peterborough United	2013–14	League One	42	4	4	0	3	0	8 (Note: Six appearances in Football League Trophy; two appearances in 2014 League One play-offs)	0	57	4
Peterborough United	2014–15	League One	38	7	2	0	1	0	0	0	41	7
Peterborough United	2015–16	League One	36	4	4	0	2	0	1 (Note: Appearance in Football League Trophy)	0	43	4
Peterborough United	2016–17	League One	38	3	4	0	2	0	1 (Note: Appearance in EFL Trophy)	0	45	3
Peterborough United	Total		193	23	15	0	10	0	10	0	228	23
Lincoln City	2017–18	League Two	44	6	1	0	1	0	9 (Note: Seven appearances in EFL Trophy; two appearances in 2018 League Two play-offs)	0	55	6
Lincoln City	2018–19	League Two	45	2	3	1	0	0	1	0	49	3
Lincoln City	2019–20	League One	18	1	0	0	2	0	1	0	21	1
Lincoln City	Total		107	9	4	1	3	0	11	0	125	10
Burton Albion	2020–21	League One	28	2	0	0	2	0	1	0	31	2
Burton Albion	2021–22	League One	10	0	0	0	0	0	0	0	10	0
Burton Albion	Total		38	2	0	0	2	0	1	0	41	2
Stevenage (loan)	2021–22	League Two	14	0	—		—		—		14	0
Stevenage	2022–23	League Two	30	0	2	0	3	0	2	0	37	0
Stevenage	Total		44	0	2	0	3	0	2	0	51	0
Boston United	2023–24	National League North	44	1	0	0	—		4 (Note: One appearance in FA Trophy; three appearances in 2024 National League North play-offs)	0	48	1
Boston United	2024–25	National League	17	0	0	0	—		0	0	17	0
Boston United	Total		61	1	0	0	0	0	4	0	65	1
St Albans City	2025–26	Isthmian League Premier Division	25	5	4	0	—		2	0	31	5
Bourne Town	2026–27	NPL Division One Midlands	2	0	1	0	—		0	0	3	0
Career total			718	67	44	3	20	1	63	2	843	73

== Honours ==
Ebbsfleet United

- FA Trophy: 2007–08

Stevenage

- Football / EFL League Two runner-up: 2022–23; play-offs: 2011
- Conference Premier: 2009–10
- FA Trophy: 2008–09; runner-up: 2009–10

Peterborough United

- Football League Trophy: 2013–14

Lincoln City

- EFL League Two: 2018–19
- EFL Trophy: 2017–18

Boston United

- National League North play-offs: 2024

Individual

- Conference Premier Team of the Year: 2009–10
- Peterborough United Player of the Year: 2016–17
- EFL League Two Team of the Year: 2017–18
- Lincoln City Player of the Year: 2018–19
- PFA Fans' League Two Player of the Year: 2018–19
