= Tyrone Barnett =

English footballer (born 1985)

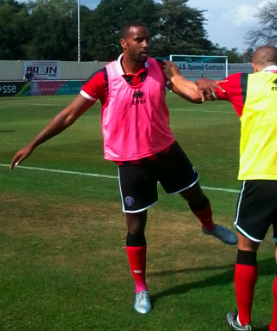
- Barnett with Shrewsbury Town in 2016

Personal information
- Full name: Tyrone Barnett
- Date of birth: 28 October 1985 (age 41)
- Place of birth: Stevenage, England
- Height: 1.91 m (6 ft 3 in)
- Position: Forward

Team information
- Current team: Halesowen Town

Youth career
- West Bromwich Albion

Senior career*
Years	Team	Apps	(Gls)
2005–2006	Rushall Olympic	56	(15)
2006–2007	AFC Telford United		
2007–2008	Willenhall Town		
2008–2010	Hednesford Town	81	(40)
2010–2011	Macclesfield Town	45	(13)
2011–2012	Crawley Town	26	(13)
2012	→ Peterborough United (loan)	13	(4)
2012–2015	Peterborough United	43	(7)
2012	→ Ipswich Town (loan)	3	(0)
2014	→ Bristol City (loan)	17	(1)
2014	→ Oxford United (loan)	12	(4)
2015–2016	Shrewsbury Town	39	(8)
2016	→ Southend United (loan)	20	(5)
2016–2017	AFC Wimbledon	36	(2)
2017–2019	Port Vale	25	(1)
2018–2019	→ Cheltenham Town (loan)	20	(4)
2019	Cheltenham Town	10	(2)
2019–2022	Eastleigh	106	(31)
2022–2023	Hereford	39	(9)
2023–2024	Leamington	39	(8)
2024–2025	Alvechurch	19	(2)
2025	Stourbridge	28	(10)
2025–	Halesowen Town	23	(4)
- * Club domestic league appearances and goals as of 10:15, 26 April 2026 (UTC)

Tyrone Barnett (born 28 October 1985) is an English semi-professional footballer who plays as a forward for Southern League Premier Division Central club Halesowen Town.

A former West Bromwich Albion youth team player, the self-described 'athletic target man' dropped into non-League football with Rushall Olympic, AFC Telford United, Willenhall Town, and Hednesford Town. He won the Birmingham Senior Cup with Hednesford before his goal-scoring record won him a move to Football League club Macclesfield Town in May 2010. He was voted the club's Player of the Year for 2010–11 and won a move to Crawley Town in June 2011. He was named to the 2011–12 League Two PFA Team of the Year. He joined Peterborough United on loan in February 2012, which was made into a permanent move at the end of the season for £1.1 million.

He struggled with injuries and discipline issues in the 2012–13 season and was loaned to Ipswich Town in November 2012. The 2013–14 season was more positive, though he was still allowed to join Bristol City on a four-month loan in January 2014. He joined Oxford United on loan in September 2014 before he was sold to Shrewsbury Town in February 2015. He helped Shrewsbury to win promotion out of League Two at the end of the 2014–15 campaign before he was loaned out to Southend United in January 2016. His contract with Shrewsbury was cancelled in August 2016, and he subsequently signed with AFC Wimbledon. He switched to Port Vale in July 2017 and moved on to Cheltenham Town in January 2019 after a successful loan spell. He joined non-League Eastleigh in August 2019, before moving to Hereford in June 2022 and Leamington in June 2023. He was promoted with Leamington out of the Southern League Premier Central play-offs in 2024 and then moved to Alvechurch, before joining Halesowen Town via Stourbridge in 2025.

== Career ==
=== Early career ===
Barnett began his career as a youth team player with West Bromwich Albion. He left The Hawthorns after not being offered a professional contract. He instead moved to Rushall Olympic, making his Southern League Division One South & West debut at the age of 19 in a 3–1 defeat to Clevedon Town. He ended the 2005–06 season with nine goals in 41 appearances. His form at the start of the 2006–07 season, scoring nine goals in 16 appearances in all competitions, led Northern Premier League Premier Division side AFC Telford United to sign Barnett in October 2006 in exchange for Dean Perrow joining Rushall on a one-month loan deal. However, he fell out of favour at the New Bucks Head and left to join Willenhall Town at the end of the season.

He spent the 2007–08 season with the "Lockmen", finishing as the club's top scorer with 22 goals, before he joined Hednesford Town. He scored 28 goals in all competitions during his first season, helping the "Pitmen" to win the Birmingham Senior Cup for the first time in 73 years with a 2–0 win over Stourbridge. He scored 26 goals in 53 games across the 2009–10 campaign to help Hednesford qualify for the Southern Premier Division play-offs. Before turning professional he had jobs working for the Halifax bank, British Car Auctions, as a security guard in job centres and as a delivery driver for a waste management company.

=== Macclesfield Town ===
In May 2010, Barnett moved to League Two side Macclesfield Town, joining former Hednesford teammate Ross Draper at Moss Rose. He made a goalscoring debut on the opening day of the 2010–11 season in a 2–2 draw at Stevenage. He initially signed a one-year deal with an option for a second; the option was quickly taken up by the "Silkmen" after he enjoyed a successful start to his league career. However, manager Gary Simpson admitted that "if he keeps playing like that we'll struggle to keep hold of him". Barnett was voted by Macclesfield Town supporters their Player of the Year for 2010–11 after scoring 13 goals in 51 matches.

=== Crawley Town ===
Barnett signed for newly-promoted League Two side Crawley Town for an undisclosed fee in June 2011. He scored the "Red Devils" first ever Football League goal on 6 August, opening the scoring in a 2–2 draw with Port Vale at Vale Park. Barnett and Crawley manager Steve Evans were nominated for Player of the Month for August and League Two Manager of the Month for August respectively, but lost to Mark Arber and Andy Scott. Barnett scored his first brace for the club against Bradford City on 16 September. His brace against Bradford attracted interest from other clubs. He went on to score a total of 14 goals in 33 games for the club in the first half of the 2011–12 season. Blackpool had a bid accepted for Barnett, but the move fell through over personal terms. Despite leaving Crawley Town, Barnett was nominated for the League Two Player of the Year, but lost out to Matt Ritchie. He was also named on the PFA Team of the Year for League Two.

=== Peterborough United ===
==== 2011–12 season ====
On 21 February 2012, Barnett signed an emergency loan deal for Championship side Peterborough United, with a permanent move worth £1.1 million agreed for the start of summer transfer window. Four days later he came off the bench to score on his debut in a 1–1 draw at Doncaster Rovers. After the match, manager Darren Ferguson described Barnett's goalscoring debut as one of the best he had witnessed. Two weeks later, on 10 March 2012, Barnett had scored three goals in three consecutive matches, bringing his tally to four. At the end of the 2011–12 season, Barnett joined Peterborough United permanently.

==== 2012–13 season ====
Barnett endured a poor start to the 2012–13 season as he suffered a hamstring problem, meaning he missed the first three matches. After his return against Birmingham City, Barnett made a reckless challenge on Greg Cunningham during a 2–1 defeat to Bristol City, which resulted in Cunningham being stretchered off; Barnett was booked rather than sent off – much to City manager Derek McInnes's frustration. Barnett scored his first goal of the 2012–13 Championship campaign with a header at Barnsley on 2 October, ending five games without scoring.

On 12 November, Barnett was transfer-listed, along with three other players, after breaching club discipline rules during an unsanctioned night out. Barnett and Nathaniel Mendez-Laing also received a police caution following the incident. Shortly after being transfer-listed, he joined Ipswich Town on loan until January 2013. Ipswich manager Mick McCarthy said that "the scouting reports have all said if you can get him until January he will be excellent." However, Barnett's loan spell ended after three appearances when he suffered a knee injury during training on 13 December.

After returning on loan from Ipswich Town, Barnett was left out of the Peterborough squad due to injury. By mid-February, manager Ferguson had forgiven Barnett and allowed him to make a return to the first team. Barnett found himself playing a smaller role in the first-team, spending time on the bench in several games. Peterborough were relegated from the Championship to League One at the end of the 2012–13 season, and Barnett was placed on the transfer list by the club, along with four players.

==== 2013–14 season ====
Barnett made his first start in over six months in the opening game of the 2013–14 season, a 1–0 win over Swindon Town at London Road. Three days later he scored his first goal in over ten months, in a 5–1 win over Colchester United in the first round of the League Cup. He went on to add six league goals to his tally with strikes against Notts County, Tranmere Rovers, Crewe Alexandra, Bristol City, Preston North End and Port Vale.

On 8 January, Barnett joined Steve Cotterill's Bristol City on loan for the remainder of the 2013–14 season. He scored his first goal for the "Robins" on 11 February, in a 3–1 win at Leyton Orient. It would prove to be the only goal from his 17 League One appearances during his spell at Ashton Gate. Upon returning to Peterborough, Barnett was told to find a new club, as per United's policy for players entering the last year of their contract.

==== 2014–15 season ====
On 2 September, Peterborough chairman Darragh MacAnthony said that he was "stunned" that Barnett and his agent did not complete a move to League Two side Oxford United in time before the transfer window shut. Eight days later Barnett joined Oxford on loan for 93 days. He made his debut on 13 September, starting in a 1–1 draw away at Exeter City. Three days later he scored his first goal for the "U's" in a 3–1 win over Accrington Stanley at the Kassam Stadium. On 4 October, Barnett was sent off for two bookings in Oxford's 1–0 home win against Newport County. Two weeks later, after returning from injury, he opened the scoring in a 2–0 home win against Tranmere Rovers. In his last three games for Oxford, Barnett scored four times, including a five-minute brace on 6 December as the team drew 2–2 with Tranmere in the second round of the FA Cup. Oxford manager Michael Appleton said he would try to re-sign Barnett at the end of his spell, but admitted that he would face competition from other clubs.

=== Shrewsbury Town ===
Barnett joined Shrewsbury Town on a two-and-a-half-year contract on 2 February 2015, for an undisclosed fee understood to be around £100,000. He made his debut five days later, replacing Mikael Mandron in the 57th minute and netting in the 85th to rescue a point in a 1–1 draw with Southend United at the New Meadow, thus preserving Shrewsbury's unbeaten home run. After seven subsequent games without a goal, he scored the final goal of a 4–1 away win over Morecambe on 17 March after coming on as a substitute for Jean-Louis Akpa Akpro with five minutes to play. On 6 April, after replacing Akpa-Akpro at half-time, Barnett scored the only goal of the game to defeat Mansfield Town at Field Mill, connecting to Mark Ellis' cross in the 50th minute. Five days later, as a late substitute again for Akpa-Akpro, he hit an added-time half-volley to conclude a 4–0 home win over Exeter City. The "Shrews" secured runners-ups spot to gain promotion out of League Two at the end of the 2014–15 season.

Barnett fell out of favour at Shrewsbury following their promotion to League One, and manager Micky Mellon handed him just one start in November and December. He was allowed to join divisional rivals Southend United on loan until the end of the season in January 2016. He scored on his "Shrimpers" debut in a 4–2 defeat at Swindon Town, and found the net four more times during his loan spell as Southend finished the season in mid-table. Despite declaring that he saw his future away from Shrewsbury Town, he returned to his parent club the following pre-season. Southend manager Phil Brown looked to sign Barnett permanently in the summer, but instead opted to go for a cheaper option and signed Nile Ranger. His contract was cancelled by mutual consent on 1 August 2016, despite having a year left to run.

=== AFC Wimbledon ===
Barnett signed for League One club AFC Wimbledon on 3 August 2016. He scored his first goal for the "Dons" in a 2–1 win at Charlton Athletic on 17 September. He started just 11 league games throughout the 2016–17 season however, claiming five goals from a total of 44 appearances, before he secured his release from the Kingsmeadow after speaking with manager Neal Ardley.

=== Port Vale ===
Barnett signed a two-year contract with newly relegated League Two side Port Vale in July 2017. However, he suffered a serious hamstring tear in a pre-season friendly which manager Michael Brown said would take "months not weeks" to recover from. He made his debut for the "Valiants" on 9 September, in a 1–0 defeat at Coventry City. He picked up a groin strain at the start of November and was ruled out of action for a few weeks. He was transfer-listed by new manager Neil Aspin at the end of the 2017–18 season after scoring just two goals in 28 appearances.

=== Cheltenham Town ===
On 30 August 2018, Barnett joined League Two rivals Cheltenham Town on a half-season loan deal; "Robins" caretaker manager Russell Milton said that "the transfer is initially until January and he has the carrot there of staying on if he does well, so we will see what happens in the future." He went on to score five goals in 26 league and cup appearances whilst on loan at Whaddon Road. On 7 January 2019, he signed a contract of undisclosed-length with Cheltenham after mutually terminating his contract at Port Vale. On 13 May 2019, he was released by Cheltenham manager Michael Duff after ending the 2018–19 season with seven goals in 37 appearances.

=== Later career ===
On 2 August 2019, Barnett joined National League side Eastleigh. Manager Ben Strevens said that he hoped Barnett's experience would be of benefit to younger members of the squad. He top-scored for the "Spitfires" with 12 goals in 39 appearances throughout the 2019–20 season, triggering a contract extension to extend his stay at Ten Acres. He scored 12 goals in 38 games during the 2020–21 campaign, finishing as the club's joint top-scorer with Joe Tomlinson. He scored eight goals from forty appearances in the 2021–22 season and was released by new manager Lee Bradbury in the summer.

After being released by Eastleigh, Barnett joined National League North side Hereford on 15 June 2022 as manager Josh Gowling's first signing of the summer. He scored nine league goals during the 2022–23 season, but was released by new manager Paul Caddis.

On 22 June 2023, Barnett joined Leamington, who had just been relegated from the National League North. He said that he joined the club to work with manager Paul Holleran once again, who had coached him early in his non-League career. He ended the 2023–24 season with ten goals in 45 appearances. He played as a late substitute in the club's play-off final victory over AFC Telford United.

On 18 May 2024, Barnett returned to the Southern League Premier Division Central, joining Alvechurch. On 26 January 2025, he joined Alvechurch's league rivals Stourbridge. He scored four goals in his first four games, including scoring twice on his debut. He ended the 2024–25 campaign with nine goals from 17 games.

In October 2025, Barnett signed for fellow Southern League Premier Division Central club Halesowen Town. He scored four goals in 23 games in the 2025–26 campaign. He was a substitute in the play-off semi-final defeat to Spalding United.

== Style of play ==
Barnett describes himself as an 'athletic target man' forward, able to use his athleticism to get on the end of a cross and his strength to hold the ball up. In February 2012, Peterborough United manager Darren Ferguson said that Barnett was "technically very good, has decent pace and he is one of the best strikers in the air that I have seen for a while".

== Career statistics ==
As of match played 29 April 2026

Appearances and goals by club, season and competition
Club	Season	League			FA Cup		League Cup		Other		Total	
Club	Season	Division	Apps	Goals	Apps	Goals	Apps	Goals	Apps	Goals	Apps	Goals
Rushall Olympic	2005–06	Southern League; Division One West	31	5	0	0	4	2	6 (Note: Appearances in the Staffordshire Senior Cup, FA Trophy, and Walsall Senior Cup.)	2	41	9
Rushall Olympic	2006–07	Southern League; Division One West	25	10	0	0	1	0	4 (Note: Appearances in the Birmingham Senior Cup, Staffordshire Senior Cup, and FA Trophy.)	1	30	11
Rushall Olympic	Total		56	15	0	0	5	2	10	3	71	20
Hednesford Town	2008–09	Northern Premier League; Premier Division	38	20	1	1	1	0	12	7	52	28
Hednesford Town	2009–10	Southern League; Premier Division	43	20	1	1	5	4	4	1	53	26
Hednesford Town	Total		81	40	2	2	6	4	16	8	105	54
Macclesfield Town	2010–11	League Two	45	13	3	0	1	0	2 (Note: Appearance(s) in the Football League Trophy / EFL Trophy.)	0	51	13
Crawley Town	2011–12	League Two	26	13	5	1	2	0	0	0	33	14
Peterborough United (loan)	2011–12	League One	13	4	—		—		—		13	4
Peterborough United	2012–13	Championship	18	1	0	0	0	0	0	0	18	1
Peterborough United	2013–14	League One	21	6	1	0	3	1	1	0	26	7
Peterborough United	2014–15	League One	4	0	0	0	1	0	1	0	6	0
Peterborough United	Total		56	11	1	0	4	1	2	0	63	12
Ipswich Town (loan)	2012–13	Championship	3	0	0	0	0	0	0	0	3	0
Bristol City (loan)	2013–14	League One	17	1	—		—		—		17	1
Oxford United (loan)	2014–15	League Two	12	4	2	2	—		—		14	6
Shrewsbury Town	2014–15	League Two	18	4	—		—		—		18	4
Shrewsbury Town	2015–16	League One	21	4	2	0	2	1	2	1	27	6
Shrewsbury Town	Total		39	8	2	0	2	1	2	1	45	10
Southend United (loan)	2015–16	League One	20	5	—		—		0	0	20	5
AFC Wimbledon	2016–17	League One	36	2	3	1	1	0	4	2	44	5
Port Vale	2017–18	League Two	25	1	1	0	0	0	2	1	28	2
Port Vale	2018–19	EFL League Two	0	0	0	0	0	0	0	0	0	0
Port Vale	Total		25	1	1	0	0	0	2	1	28	2
Cheltenham Town	2018–19	EFL League Two	30	6	3	1	0	0	4	0	37	7
Eastleigh	2019–20	National League	34	11	4	1	—		1 (Note: Appearance(s) in the FA Trophy.)	0	39	12
Eastleigh	2020–21	National League	36	12	2	0	—		0	0	38	12
Eastleigh	2021–22	National League	36	8	3	1	—		1	0	40	9
Eastleigh	Total		106	31	9	2	0	0	2	0	117	33
Hereford	2022–23	National League North	39	9	2	0	—		1	0	42	9
Leamington	2023–24	Southern League; Premier Central	39	8	2	0	—		4 (Note: One appearance in FA Trophy; one appearance, two goals in Birmingham Senior Cup; two appearances in play-offs)	2	45	10
Alvechurch	2024–25	Southern League; Premier Central	19	2	1	0	—		5 (Note: Four appearances in FA Trophy; one appearance in Worcestershire Senior Cup)	0	25	2
Stourbridge	2024–25	Southern League; Premier Central	16	8	—		—		3 (Note: Two appearances and one goal in Worcestershire Senior Cup, one appearance in Birmingham Senior Cup)	1	19	9
Stourbridge	2025–26	Southern League; Premier Central	12	2	2	1	—		1	0	15	3
Stourbridge	Total		28	10	2	1	0	0	4	1	34	12
Halesowen Town	2025–26	Southern League; Premier Central	23	4	—		—		1 (Note: Appearance(s) in the play-offs.)	0	24	4
Halesowen Town	2026–27	Southern League; Premier Central	0	0	0	0	—		0	0	0	0
Halesowen Town	Total		23	4	0	0	0	0	1	0	24	4
Career total (Note: Statistics for AFC Telford United and Willenhall Town not recorded.)			700	183	38	10	21	8	59	18	818	219

== Honours ==
Hednesford Town

- Birmingham Senior Cup: 2008–09

Shrewsbury Town

- Football League Two second-place promotion: 2014–15

Leamington

- Southern League Premier Central play-offs: 2024

Individual

- Macclesfield Town Player of the Year: 2010–11
- PFA Team of the Year: 2011–12 League Two
