= Nicky Ajose =

English footballer (born 1991)

Personal information
- Full name: Nicholas Olushola Ajose
- Date of birth: 7 October 1991 (age 35)
- Place of birth: Bury, England
- Height: 5 ft 6 in (1.68 m)
- Position: Forward

Youth career
- 1999–2009: Manchester United

Senior career*
Years	Team	Apps	(Gls)
2009–2011	Manchester United	0	(0)
2010–2011	→ Bury (loan)	28	(13)
2011–2014	Peterborough United	24	(7)
2011	→ Scunthorpe United (loan)	7	(0)
2012	→ Chesterfield (loan)	12	(1)
2012	→ Crawley Town (loan)	19	(2)
2013	→ Bury (loan)	19	(4)
2013–2014	→ Swindon Town (loan)	16	(6)
2014–2015	Leeds United	3	(0)
2014–2015	→ Crewe Alexandra (loan)	27	(8)
2015–2016	Swindon Town	38	(24)
2016–2019	Charlton Athletic	42	(8)
2017	→ Swindon Town (loan)	15	(5)
2017–2018	→ Bury (loan)	9	(1)
2019	→ Mansfield Town (loan)	10	(2)
2019–2021	Exeter City	17	(2)
Total		286	(83)

International career
2006–2007	England U16	4	(0)
2007	England U17	1	(0)
- * Club domestic league appearances and goals

Nicholas Olushola Ajose (born 7 October 1991) is an English former professional footballer who played as a forward.

Ajose began his career with Manchester United, but never made an appearance in the first team and spent much of the 2010–11 season on loan to Bury. He joined Peterborough United in July 2011, but spent time on loan with Scunthorpe United, Chesterfield, Crawley Town and Swindon Town, as well as another six months with Bury, before joining Leeds United in August 2014. After a spell on loan with Crewe Alexandra during the 2014–15 season, his contract with Leeds was terminated by mutual consent in September 2015, when he rejoined Swindon. In June 2016, Ajose moved to Charlton Athletic, where he made infrequent appearances, resulting in loan spells with Swindon, Bury and Mansfield Town. He was released at the end of the 2018–19 season, when he signed for Exeter.

Ajose played for England at under-16 and under-17 level. Also eligible to play for Nigeria, he was called up to the Nigeria under-20s for the 2009 African Youth Championship.

== Club career ==
=== Manchester United ===
Born in Bury, Ajose made his way through Manchester United's youth squads, having joined the club in 1999. He was awarded with his first professional contract by the club in the summer of 2009.

==== Bury (loan) ====
On 24 September 2010, Ajose joined his home-town club, Bury, on a one-month loan deal, he made his debut the following day as an 80th-minute substitute in a 2–0 away win over Cheltenham Town. His first goal for Bury came on his fifth appearance, a 3–0 home win over Accrington Stanley on 9 October. Seven days later he netted in a 4–3 away victory over Torquay United. His loan was later extended until 3 January 2011. Ajose then scored goals in a 3–1 away wins over Aldershot Town on 30 October, and Burton Albion on 19 November. Ajose netted twice in a 5–0 away win over Lincoln City on 23 November. On 5 January 2011, Bury announced that they had agreed at a meeting with Sir Alex Ferguson that Ajose would remain at Bury on loan until 30 June 2011. He returned to Manchester United for treatment in February after damaging his knee. Five weeks later he rejoined Bury to commence the rest of his loan spell. Ajose scored his first goal of 2011 in a 4–2 away victory over Macclesfield Town on 1 February. He scored twice in a 3–0 victory over Oxford United on 2 April, before netting another brace in a 4–2 away win over Northampton Town the following week.

=== Peterborough United ===
After failing to make it into the Manchester United first-team, Ajose joined Peterborough United – managed by Darren Ferguson, son of Manchester United manager Sir Alex Ferguson – on 5 July 2011. Peterborough paid an undisclosed fee for the striker, thought to be around £300,000 who signed a four-year contract with the club. After a short loan spell with Scunthorpe United he signed on loan with Chesterfield for the remainder of the season, scoring his first goal against his former club, Bury. However, he was unavailable to play in the final of the Football League Trophy, having played for Scunthorpe in the same competition earlier in the season. Next a loan spell with former manager Richie Barker's Crawley Town came with 18 appearances and nine goals, Ajose scored the goal that knocked Championship side Bolton Wanderers out of the Football League Cup. In January 2013, Ajose returned to Peterborough, before again signing for his home-town team, Bury, on loan for the rest of the season on 23 January. On 2 February, Ajose scored his first goal back at Bury with a headed effort in their 2–0 over Doncaster Rovers at Gigg Lane. In August 2013, Ajose joined Scottish Premiership side St Johnstone (who had qualified for UEFA Europa League) on trial.

On 30 August 2013, Ajose signed for Swindon Town on loan until 1 January 2014. He scored 10 goals in 21 games for Swindon in all competitions.

After impressing during his six-month loan spell at Swindon, Ajose returned to Peterborough United in January 2014. On 7 February, Ajose won the League One Player of the Month award for January 2014. He scored seven goals for Peterborough United in 22 league appearances, helping them reach the League One play-offs. Ajose started both legs of the play-off semi-final against Leyton Orient, playing alongside Britt Assombalonga up front, but Orient won 3–2 on aggregate and Peterborough were knocked out. Ajose scored 17 goals in all competitions during the 2013–14 season, with 13 of those coming in the league. However, as he was for Chesterfield two years earlier, he was again cup-tied for Peterborough's victory in the 2013–14 Football League Trophy.

In line with the club's policy of transfer-listing all players entering the last year of their contracts, Ajose was transfer-listed by Peterborough on 15 May 2014.

=== Leeds United ===
On 5 August 2014, Ajose signed a three-year contract with Leeds United, who paid Peterborough an undisclosed fee, reported to be around £150,000. Ajose made his debut for Leeds on 9 August against Millwall.

==== Crewe Alexandra loan ====
On 26 November 2014, Ajose joined Crewe Alexandra in an emergency loan deal until 5 January 2015. After Ajose scored three goals in five matches for the Alex, their manager Steve Davis revealed that he was in talks with Leeds head coach Neil Redfearn about renewing the loan deal, and on 8 January 2015 Crewe announced that they had secured Ajose on loan until the end of the 2014–15 season.

During his loan spell, Ajose scored eight league goals for Crewe finishing as the club's top scorer, his goals and numerous assists helped keep the club in League One with Crewe Alexandra staying up on the final day of the season and finishing in 20th place, after being firmly in the relegation places upon Ajose's initial arrival at the club. Crewe Manager Steve Davis praised Ajose's impact in helping keep the club in the division.

==== Return to Leeds ====
During the 2014–15 pre-season, incoming Leeds head coach Uwe Rösler said on his arrival at the club that all players had a clean slate, and he singled out Ajose as a player who had impressed him in training. On 10 July 2015, Ajose started Leeds' first pre-season friendly ahead of the 2015–16 season in a 1–1 draw against Harrogate Town. On 15 July, Ajose made a second appearance in Leeds' 1–1 friendly draw against York City, but he was left out of the squad for the club's tour of Austria and Norway.

=== Swindon Town ===
After not being assigned a squad number for the 2015–16 season, Ajose's contract with Leeds United was terminated by mutual consent on 2 September 2015. Later that day, he signed a three-year contract with Swindon Town, where he had spent six months on loan in 2013. He later scored on his debut in a 3–1 win against Crewe Alexandra

Ajose scored 24 League goals during the 2015/16 season for Swindon and finished as League 1's 2nd Top Goal Scorer just behind Will Grigg.

=== Charlton Athletic ===
On 16 June 2016, it was announced that Charlton Athletic were targeting Ajose from Swindon Town for a fee in the region of £800,000. He scored his first goals for Charlton when he scored twice in a 2–1 win over Walsall on 20 August 2016.

On 31 January 2017, it was announced that Ajose would return to former club Swindon Town on loan for the rest of the 2016/17 season.

Ajose scored his first two goals away at a struggling Coventry City side, where the match ended 3–1 to Swindon Town.

On 14 July 2017, Ajose returned to former club Bury on a season long loan deal.

On 1 February 2018, Ajose returned to his parent club Charlton Athletic after cutting his loan at Bury short.

On 14 January 2019, Ajose joined Mansfield Town on loan for the remainder of the 2018–19 season.

He was released by Charlton at the end of the 2018–19 season.

=== Exeter City ===
He joined Exeter City on a free transfer on 3 July 2019. He scored his first goal for Exeter when he scored in an EFL Trophy tie against Cheltenham Town on 3 September 2019. In October 2019 it was announced he would undergo surgery for an ankle injury, having missed the last month of play. He scored his first league goal for the Grecians in a 3–1 away defeat against Port Vale. On 12 May 2021 it was announced that he would leave Exeter at the end of the season, following the expiry of his contract.

== Coaching career ==
Ajose became Under 18s coach at Exeter City in September 2021.

In October 2024, he left his role at Exeter to pursue an opportunity with Manchester City Women's club.

== International career ==
Ajose was capped by England four times at under-16 level and once at under-17 level.

He is also eligible to play for Nigeria and was called up by Nigeria under-20s for the 2009 African Youth Championship.

== Career statistics ==
As of match played 9 January 2021

Appearances and goals by club, season and competition
Club	Season	League			FA Cup		League Cup		Other		Total	
Club	Season	Division	Apps	Goals	Apps	Goals	Apps	Goals	Apps	Goals	Apps	Goals
Bury (loan)	2010–11	League Two	28	13	2	0	0	0	2 (Note: Appearances in Football League Trophy)	0	32	13
Peterborough United	2011–12	Championship	2	0	0	0	0	0	—		2	0
Peterborough United	2012–13	Championship	0	0	1	0	0	0	—		1	0
Peterborough United	2013–14	League One	22	7	0	0	0	0	2 (Note: Appearances in League One play-offs)	0	24	7
Peterborough United	Total		24	7	1	0	0	0	2	0	27	7
Scunthorpe United (loan)	2011–12	League One	7	0	1	0	0	0	1	0	9	0
Chesterfield (loan)	2011–12	League One	12	1	—		0	0	—		12	1
Crawley Town (loan)	2012–13	League One	19	2	0	0	2	1	1	0	22	3
Bury (loan)	2012–13	League One	19	4	0	0	—		—		19	4
Swindon Town (loan)	2013–14	League One	16	6	1	0	1	0	3	4	21	10
Leeds United	2014–15	Championship	3	0	0	0	1	0	—		4	0
Crewe Alexandra (loan)	2014–15	League One	27	8	0	0	—		0	0	27	8
Swindon Town	2015–16	League One	38	24	1	1	0	0	1	0	40	25
Charlton Athletic	2016–17	League One	21	6	3	0	1	0	3 (Note: Appearances in EFL Trophy)	1	28	7
Charlton Athletic	2017–18	League One	12	1	—		—		2 (Note: Two appearances in the League One play-offs)	0	14	1
Charlton Athletic	2018–19	League One	9	1	3	1	1	0	3 (Note: Three appearances in the EFL Trophy)	1	16	3
Charlton Athletic	Total		42	8	6	1	2	0	8	2	58	11
Swindon Town (loan)	2016–17	League One	15	5	—		—		—		15	5
Bury (loan)	2017–18	League One	9	1	1	0	1	0	3	3	14	4
Mansfield Town (loan)	2018–19	League Two	10	2	—		—		1 (Note: One appearance in the League Two play-offs)	0	11	2
Exeter City	2019–20	League Two	13	2	0	0	0	0	3 (Note: Three appearances in the EFL Trophy)	3	16	5
Exeter City	2020–21	League Two	4	0	1	0	0	0	4 (Note: Four appearances in the EFL Trophy)	1	9	1
Exeter City	Total		17	2	1	0	0	0	7	4	25	6
Career totals			286	83	14	2	7	1	29	13	336	99

== Honours ==
Bury

- Football League Two runner-up: 2010–11

Individual

- Football League One Player of the Month: January 2014
- The Football League Team of the Season: 2015–16
