= Tommy Rowe =

English footballer

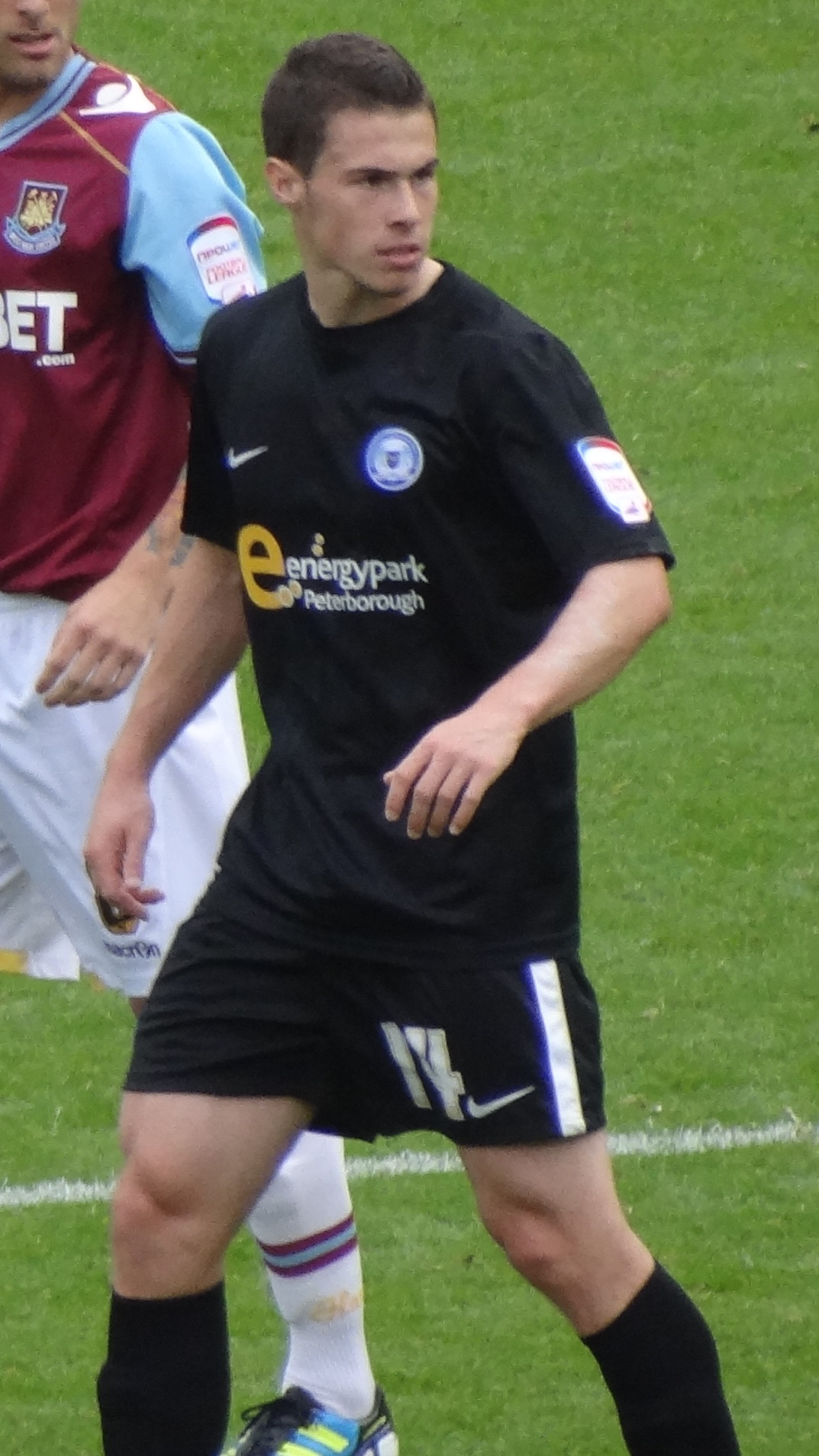
- Rowe playing for Peterborough United in 2011

Personal information
- Full name: Thomas Malcolm Rowe
- Date of birth: 24 September 1988 (age 38)
- Place of birth: Wythenshawe, England
- Height: 5 ft 11 in (1.80 m)
- Positions: Midfielder; winger

Team information
- Current team: Manchester United
- Number: 47

Youth career
- 2002–2003: Manchester United
- 2003–2007: Stockport County

Senior career*
Years	Team	Apps	(Gls)
2007–2009	Stockport County	72	(13)
2009–2014	Peterborough United	175	(23)
2014–2016	Wolverhampton Wanderers	17	(0)
2015	→ Scunthorpe United (loan)	14	(1)
2016	→ Doncaster Rovers (loan)	10	(3)
2016–2019	Doncaster Rovers	118	(22)
2019–2021	Bristol City	60	(3)
2021–2024	Doncaster Rovers	107	(13)
2024–2025	Manchester United	0	(0)
- * Club domestic league appearances and goals as of 13:58, 20 May 2024 (UTC)

Thomas Malcolm Rowe (born 24 September 1988) is a retired English professional footballer who primarily played as a winger. He is now a coach for the Manchester United academy.

== Career ==
=== Stockport County ===
Rowe was born in Wythenshawe, Manchester, and started his career as a boy with Manchester United in 2002. He joined the Stockport County youth system the following year, and made his first-team debut as an 81st-minute substitute in their 4–1 defeat away at Watford in the FA Cup third round in January 2007. He scored his first goal for Stockport against Notts County at Edgeley Park in February 2008, and followed this up with a hat-trick at Rotherham United a few days later, which prompted Stockport County manager Jim Gannon to say, "Physically, he is a supreme athlete with Premier League fitness and technically he is excellent. What an accomplished performance – the only thing is maybe the England scouts won't come to look at him. I've said it to him personally, I think he has a great future." Rowe made 30 appearances in the 2007–08 season, including all the playoff games, as Stockport won promotion to League One. At the end of the season, Rowe won the club's Young Player of the Year Award.

He made a further 50 appearances for Stockport in the 2008–09 season.

=== Peterborough United ===
After Stockport went into administration at the end of April 2009, the administrators sold Rowe to raise necessary funding for the club. Rowe joined League One side Peterborough United for £225,000 on a three-year contract in May 2009. He scored his first goal for Peterborough in a 4–0 win away at Wycombe in the first round of the League Cup at the beginning of the 2009–10 season. After becoming a regular player in the Peterborough team, Rowe ended the 2010/11 campaign by scoring the opening goal at a 3–0 win over Huddersfield Town in the League One play-off final as they won promotion to the Football League Championship.

Rowe was appointed Peterborough's captain for the 2012–13 season but the team ended up suffering relegation despite reaching 54 points. He remained with the Posh for a further season back in League One, during which he lifted the Football League Trophy after a 3–1 win over Chesterfield. However, following a play-off defeat to Leyton Orient, Rowe was named as one of a series of players who would not be offered a new contract. In total he made 199 appearances for the club, scoring 27 times.

=== Wolverhampton Wanderers ===
Out of contract at Peterborough, Rowe signed a two-year deal on 3 June 2014 with newly promoted Championship side Wolverhampton Wanderers. After overcoming a broken toe sustained during pre-season, he made his club debut on 30 August 2014 as a substitute in a 3–1 win against Blackburn. Rowe failed to establish himself in Wolves' first team, primarily appearing only as a substitute before breaking a bone in his foot on Boxing Day 2014 and undergoing surgery. A recurrence of the problem meant he failed to play again during the season.

Rowe made a solitary League Cup appearance for Wolves during the start of the 2015–16 campaign before being loaned out in October to League One Scunthorpe United for several months.

At the conclusion of the season his parent club announced they would not be renewing Rowe's contract. He had made 18 appearances for the club over two years.

=== Doncaster Rovers ===
After making three appearances for his parent club in late February 2016, he was again loaned out, joining Doncaster Rovers on loan until the end of the season linking up with former manager Darren Ferguson. He made his début later on that day in a 2–1 home defeat to his former club Peterborough United but was unable to stop the team being relegated. On 18 May 2016, Rowe signed a permanent 3-year deal at League Two Side Doncaster Rovers, becoming Ferguson's first summer signing.

Rowe scored in his permanent debut in a 3-2 loss against Accrington Stanley.

On 8 April 2017, Rowe scored the winning goal against Mansfield Town, securing Doncaster's automatic promotion from League Two in the 2016–17 season. Doncaster finished third in the table with 87 points, narrowly missing out on the league title by one point to Portsmouth. The club had remained in contention for the title until the final day of the season. Rowe scored 13 goals in 47 appearances in for Doncaster.

Following Doncaster's promotion to League One, Rowe retained his place in the side during the 2017–18 season. On 3 December 2017, Doncaster faced local rivals and Rowe's former club, Scunthorpe United, in the second round of the FA Cup at the Keepmoat Stadium. Rowe scored twice as Doncaster recorded a 3–0 victory.

He made 40 appearances in League One, scoring four goals, and was involved in 46 matches across all competitions.

During the 2018–19 season, Doncaster qualified for the League One play-offs after finishing sixth in the table. In the second leg of the semi-final against Charlton Athletic at The Valley, Rowe scored Doncaster's opening goal. The match finished 3–2 to Doncaster after extra time, leaving the tie level at 4–4 on aggregate and forcing a penalty shoot-out. Rowe took Doncaster's fifth penalty but missed, allowing Charlton to win the shoot-out 4–3 and progress to the play-off final..

He was offered a new contract by Doncaster at the end of the 2018–19 season.

=== Bristol City ===
On 1 July 2019 Rowe signed a two-year contract with Championship side Bristol City.

On 14 May 2021, Rowe left Bristol City due to his contract expiring.

=== Return to Doncaster Rovers ===
On 23 June 2021, it was announced that Rowe had rejoined Doncaster Rovers. On 5 February 2022, Rowe scored the winner against Sunderland at the Stadium of Light.

Rowe made 43 league appearances and scoring seven goals. He was also Doncaster's leading goal scorer in all competitions, with eight goals. Despite Rowe's contribution, Doncaster endured a difficult campaign and finished 22nd in League One, resulting in relegation to League Two. Rowe was subsequently named the club's Player of the Year for the 2021–22 season.

On 9 June 2022, Rowe signed a new two-year contract with Doncaster. During the 2022–23 season, Rowe was used in a variety of positions as Doncaster dealt with changes to their squad. Although primarily a midfielder by this stage of his career, he was deployed at left-back and centre-back, as well as in midfield. After a poor season, Doncaster finished in 18th place.

On 30 August 2023, Doncaster Rovers faced Everton in the second round of the EFL Cup. Rowe delivered a cross for Joe Ironside, who headed the ball into the net to give Doncaster a 1–0 lead. Everton later scored twice to win the match 2–1.

The final months of the 2023–24 season saw Doncaster produce a dramatic turnaround in form. After being in 20th place in League Two in early March, the club embarked on a run of ten consecutive league victories, which lifted them into the play-off positions and equalled the club record for consecutive league wins.

One of the most significant victories came against fellow play-off contenders Barrow on 20 April 2024. With Doncaster's promotion play-off hopes still in the balance, the match was effectively a must-win fixture in their pursuit of a top-seven finish. After the first half, Doncaster were 2-0 down, but after 2nd half goals from Joe Ironside and Hakeeb Adelakun Doncaster were level. Rowe crossed the ball into the penalty area in the 88th minute, with Harrison Biggins heading it into the net to put Doncaster 3–2 ahead. Doncaster went on to win 4–2.

Doncaster finished fifth in League Two and faced Crewe Alexandra in the play-off semi-finals. Rowe started the second leg at the Eco-Power Stadium, where Crewe won a shoot-out 4–3, ending Doncaster's promotion hopes. The match was Rowe's final appearance for the club.

On 15 May 2024, the club announced he would be released in the summer once his contract expired.

=== Return to Manchester United ===
After featuring in several Premier League 2 games, Rowe returned to Manchester United more than two decades after leaving, taking up a player-coach role with the academy team.

Rowe played in the 2024–25 EFL Trophy, wearing the number 47. He retired after the 2024-25 season to take up a coaching role with the academy.

== Personal life ==
Tommy's younger brother, Danny, is also a professional footballer.

== Career statistics ==
As of match played 12 November 2024

Club statistics
Club	Season	League			FA Cup		League Cup		Other		Total	
Club	Season	Division	Apps	Goals	Apps	Goals	Apps	Goals	Apps	Goals	Apps	Goals
Stockport County	2006–07	League Two	4	0	1	0	0	0	0	0	5	0
Stockport County	2007–08	League Two	24	6	1	0	0	0	5 (Note: Two appearances in Football League Trophy, three in Football League Two play-offs.)	0	30	6
Stockport County	2008–09	League One	44	7	4	0	1	0	1 (Note: Appearance(s) in Football League/EFL Trophy)	0	50	7
Stockport County	Total		72	13	6	0	1	0	6	0	85	13
Peterborough United	2009–10	Championship	32	2	0	0	3	1	—		35	3
Peterborough United	2010–11	League One	35	5	2	0	3	0	3 (Note: Appearances in Football League One play-offs)	1	43	6
Peterborough United	2011–12	Championship	43	4	1	0	2	0	—		46	4
Peterborough United	2012–13	Championship	31	5	1	0	0	0	—		32	5
Peterborough United	2013–14	League One	34	7	1	1	3	1	5 (Note: Three appearances in Football League Trophy, two in Football League One play-offs.)	0	43	9
Peterborough United	Total		175	23	5	1	11	2	8	1	199	27
Wolverhampton Wanderers	2014–15	Championship	14	0	0	0	0	0	—		14	0
Wolverhampton Wanderers	2015–16	Championship	3	0	0	0	1	0	—		4	0
Wolverhampton Wanderers	Total		17	0	0	0	1	0	0	0	18	0
Scunthorpe United	2015–16	League One	14	1	0	0	0	0	0	0	14	1
Doncaster Rovers	2015–16	League One	10	3	0	0	0	0	0	0	10	3
Doncaster Rovers	2016–17	League Two	46	13	0	0	1	0	0	0	47	13
Doncaster Rovers	2017–18	League One	40	4	3	4	3	1	1	0	47	9
Doncaster Rovers	2018–19	League One	32	5	4	0	1	0	3 (Note: One appearance in EFL Trophy, two in EFL League One play-offs)	1	40	6
Doncaster Rovers	Total		128	25	7	4	5	1	4	1	144	31
Bristol City	2019–20	Championship	29	2	1	0	1	0	—		31	2
Bristol City	2020–21	Championship	31	1	2	0	3	0	—		36	1
Bristol City	Total		60	3	3	0	4	0	—		67	3
Doncaster Rovers	2021–22	League One	43	7	2	1	1	0	4	0	50	8
Doncaster Rovers	2022–23	League Two	28	2	0	0	0	0	0	0	24	1
Doncaster Rovers	2023–24	League Two	38	4	1	0	2	0				
Doncaster Rovers	Total		67	8	2	1	1	0	4	0	74	9
Manchester United U21	2024–25	—	—		—		—		2	0	2	0
Career totals			533	73	23	6	23	3	24	2	603	84

== Honours ==
Stockport County

- Football League Two play-offs: 2008

Peterborough United

- Football League One play-offs: 2011
- Football League Trophy: 2013–14

Individual

- Doncaster Rovers Player of the Year: 2021–22
