= Joe Newell =

English footballer

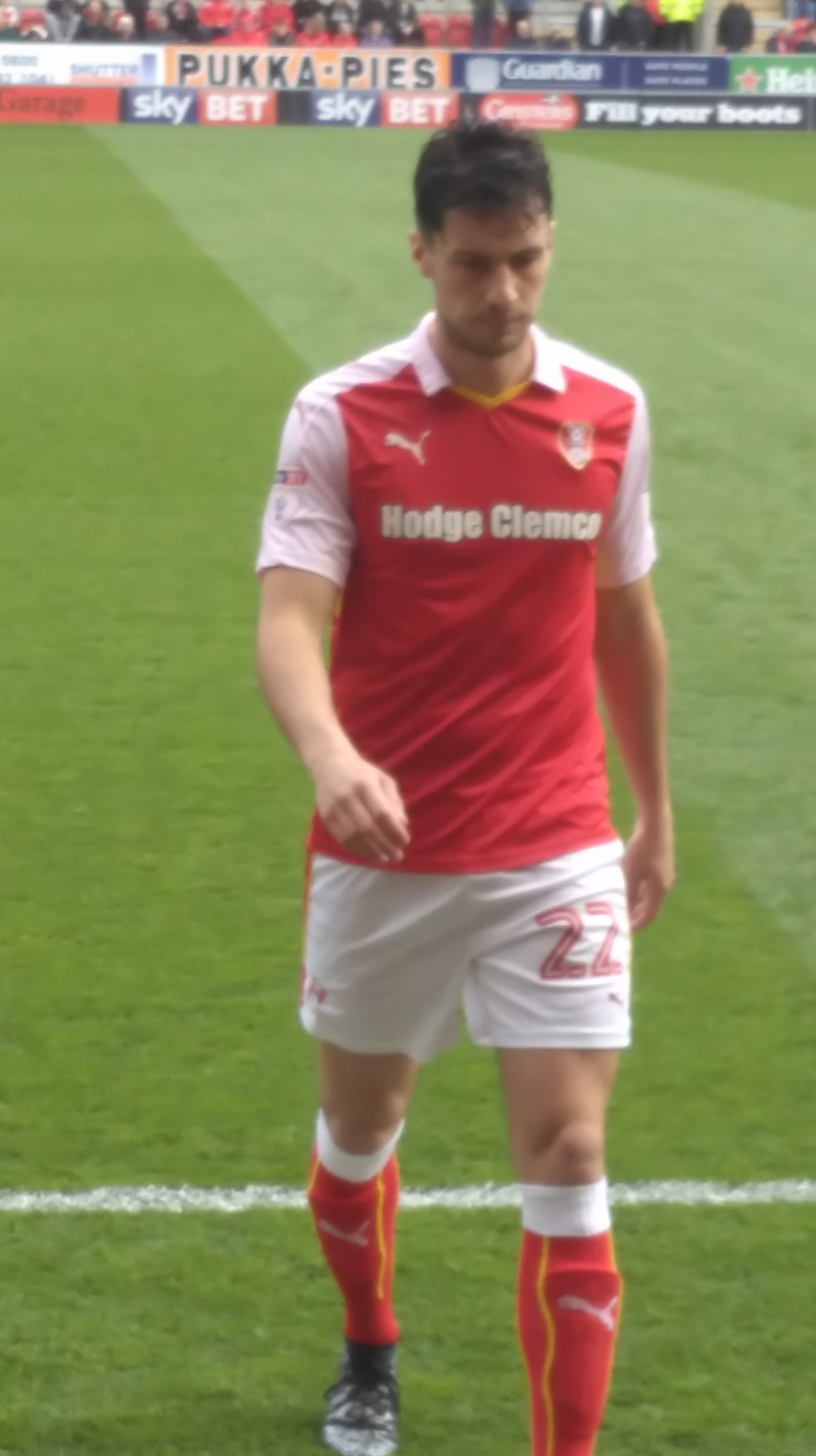
- Newell playing for Rotherham United in 2017

Personal information
- Full name: Joseph Peter Newell
- Date of birth: 15 March 1993 (age 33)
- Place of birth: Tamworth, England
- Position: Midfielder

Team information
- Current team: Hibernian
- Number: 11

Youth career
- 2001–2009: Birmingham City
- 2009–2011: Peterborough United

Senior career*
Years	Team	Apps	(Gls)
2011–2015	Peterborough United	96	(3)
2011	→ St Albans City (loan)	2	(0)
2015–2019	Rotherham United	139	(14)
2019–	Hibernian	179	(7)
- * Club domestic league appearances and goals as of 20 May 2026

Joseph Peter Newell (born 15 March 1993) is an English professional footballer who plays for Scottish Premiership club Hibernian as a midfielder, where he is captain and current longest-serving player, having signed for the club in 2019. Newell has previously played for Peterborough United, St Albans City and Rotherham United.

== Career ==
=== Peterborough United ===
Newell made his debut for Peterborough United on 25 April 2011, in a 2–2 draw at home to Yeovil Town. He made his second appearance in a 5–0 win against Dagenham & Redbridge on 7 May 2011. He began to establish himself in the team during the 2011–12 season, and scored his first goal for the club in an away match against Leeds United on 14 April 2012. He scored his second goal for the club on 14 August 2012, helping Peterborough to a 4–0 win against Southend United in the first round of the League Cup. Newell picked up the Peterborough United FC, BBC radio Cambridgeshire and away supporters player of the year awards for the 2014–15 season.

=== Rotherham United ===
On 5 August 2015, Newell joined Championship side Rotherham United on a three-year deal. After four years at the club, which included a Wembley play-off final win, he left at the end of the 2018–19 season.

=== Hibernian ===
Newell signed a two-year contract with Scottish Premiership club Hibernian in June 2019. He scored his first goal for the club in a Scottish League Cup tie against Elgin City on 26 July 2019. Newell initially struggled playing in a wide-left position, but his form improved after he was moved into a central midfield role. On 23 February 2021, Newell signed a new two-and-a-half-year deal with Hibernian, with the option to extend a further year. He signed another new contract in March 2022, which is due to run until the end of the 2024–25 season. Newell won both the Players' Player and Supporters' Player of the year awards for the 2022–23 season.

== Career statistics ==
As of match played on 16 May 2026

Appearances and goals by club, season and competition
Club	Season	League			National Cup		League Cup		Other		Total	
Club	Season	Division	Apps	Goals	Apps	Goals	Apps	Goals	Apps	Goals	Apps	Goals
Peterborough United	2010–11	League One	2	0	0	0	0	0	0	0	2	0
Peterborough United	2011–12	Championship	14	1	1	0	0	0	0	0	15	1
Peterborough United	2012–13	Championship	30	0	1	0	2	1	0	0	33	1
Peterborough United	2013–14	League One	11	0	3	0	1	0	2 (Note: Appearances in Football League Trophy)	0	17	0
Peterborough United	2014–15	League One	39	2	2	0	0	0	1	0	42	2
Peterborough United	Total		96	3	7	0	3	1	3	0	109	4
St Albans City (loan)	2010–11	Conference South	2	0	0	0	—		0	0	2	0
Rotherham United	2015–16	Championship	35	5	1	0	2	0	0	0	38	5
Rotherham United	2016–17	Championship	34	2	1	0	0	0	0	0	35	2
Rotherham United	2017–18	League One	39	7	1	0	1	0	4 (Note: 1 appearance in 2017–18 EFL Trophy. 3 appearances in 2017–18 EFL League One play-offs)	1	45	8
Rotherham United	2018–19	Championship	31	0	0	0	1	0	0	0	32	0
Rotherham United	Total		139	14	3	0	4	0	4	1	150	15
Hibernian	2019–20 (Note: One appearance in the 2019–20 Scottish Cup was in a match delayed until October 2020 due to the COVID-19 pandemic.)	Scottish Premiership	19	0	2	0	4	1	—		25	1
Hibernian	2020–21	Scottish Premiership	32	1	5	0	3	0	—		40	1
Hibernian	2021–22	Scottish Premiership	27	0	3	0	4	1	3 (Note: Appearances in the 2021–22 UEFA Europa Conference League.)	0	37	1
Hibernian	2022–23	Scottish Premiership	34	1	0	0	4	2	—		38	3
Hibernian	2023–24	Scottish Premiership	37	2	3	0	3	0	6 (Note: Appearances in the 2023–24 UEFA Europa Conference League.)	2	49	4
Hibernian	2024–25	Scottish Premiership	16	2	0	0	4	0	—		20	2
Hibernian	2025–26	Scottish Premiership	14	1	1	0	0	0	0	0	15	1
Hibernian	Total		179	7	14	0	22	4	9	2	224	13
Career total			416	24	24	0	29	5	16	3	485	32

== Honours ==
Peterborough United

- Football League One play-offs: 2011
- Football League Trophy: 2013–14

Rotherham United

- EFL League One play-offs: 2018
