= Charlie Coulson =

English footballer

Personal information
- Full name: Charlie William Coulson
- Date of birth: 11 January 1996 (age 30)
- Place of birth: Kettering, England
- Position: Midfielder

Team information
- Current team: Ilkeston F.C.

Youth career
- 2009–2012: Peterborough United

Senior career*
Years	Team	Apps	(Gls)
2012–2014	Peterborough United	1	(0)
2014–2015	Deeping Rangers	15	(2)
2015–2016	Ilkeston		
2016	St Neots Town	8	(0)
2016–	Deeping Rangers		
- * Club domestic league appearances and goals as of 19:26, 30 April 2012 (UTC)

Charlie William Coulson (born 11 January 1996 in Kettering, England) is an English footballer who plays for Deeping Rangers.

== Career ==
Coulson joined Peterborough United at the age of 13, having previously played for Rushden & Diamonds. He was drafted into first team action in April 2012, for Posh's last home game of the season, a 2–2 draw with Watford. Coulson came on as a late substitute for Joe Newell, becoming Peterborough's second youngest ever player behind Matthew Etherington. On 30 April 2012, Coulson agreed a two-and-a-half-year professional contract, with an option of an extra year, which will be enacted on his 17th birthday. Coulson had his contract cancelled by mutual consent on 2 June 2014, and he became a free agent.

On 1 November 2014, he made his debut for Deeping Rangers coming on as a substitute in the first round of the FA Vase against Wivenhoe Town. In July 2015 he signed for Ilkeston, before ending the season with St Neots Town. He returned to Deeping Rangers for the 2016–17 season.
