= David Ball (footballer) =

English footballer

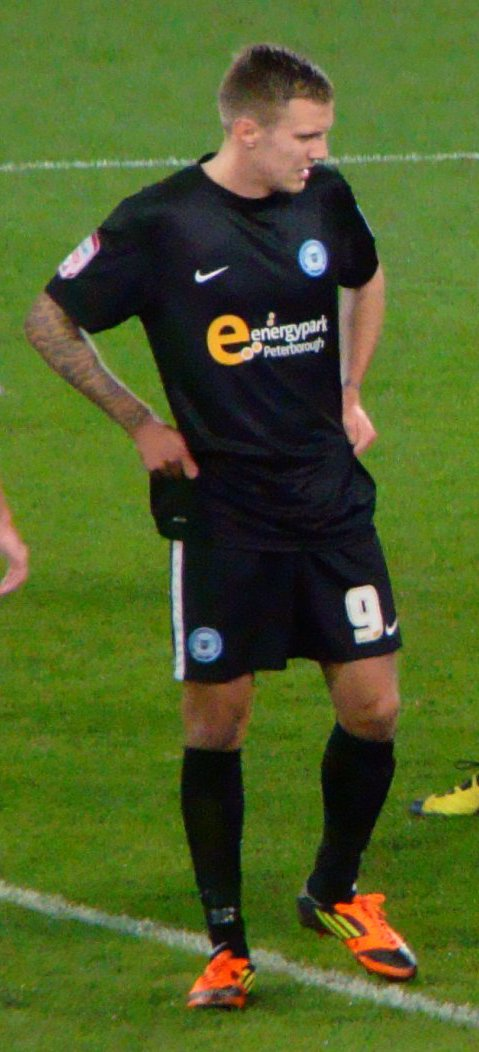
- Ball playing for Peterborough United in 2012

Personal information
- Full name: David Michael Ball
- Date of birth: 14 December 1989 (age 36)
- Place of birth: Whitefield, Greater Manchester, England
- Height: 6 ft 0 in (1.83 m)
- Position: Striker

Team information
- Current team: FC St Helens

Youth career
- 199?–1997: Prestwich Marauders
- 1997–2009: Manchester City

Senior career*
Years	Team	Apps	(Gls)
2009–2011	Manchester City	0	(0)
2010–2011	→ Swindon Town (loan)	18	(2)
2011–2012	Peterborough United	41	(9)
2011	→ Rochdale (loan)	7	(3)
2011–2012	→ Rochdale (loan)	7	(0)
2012–2017	Fleetwood Town	179	(41)
2017–2019	Rotherham United	34	(8)
2018–2019	→ Bradford City (loan)	35	(5)
2019–2025	Wellington Phoenix	124	(15)
2024	Wellington Phoenix Reserves	3	(1)
2025–2026	Radcliffe	47	(6)
2026–	FC St Helens	7	(2)
- * Club domestic league appearances and goals as of 22 Sept 2026

David Michael Ball (born 14 December 1989) is an English professional footballer who plays as a striker for FC St Helens.

Began his career at Manchester City, but he never made a first-team appearance despite being a star player in the club's Reserve and Academy teams. He started the 2010–11 season on loan at Swindon Town, before he was signed by Peterborough United in January 2011. Peterborough won promotion out of League One via the play-offs in 2011, though Ball returned to the division on loan at Rochdale for the first half of the 2011–12 season. He was signed to Fleetwood Town in July 2012, and helped the club to win the 2014 League Two play-off final. He scored 49 goals in 209 league and cup games in a five-year stay at Fleetwood, before moving on to Rotherham United in June 2017. He helped Rotherham to win the 2018 League One play-offs, but left the club after spending most of the 2018–19 season on loan at Bradford City.

== Career ==
=== Manchester City ===
Ball spent his early childhood with Prestwich Marauders, before he joined the youth system at Manchester City at the age of seven. He battled back from a foot injury at the end of his teenage years. A star of the youth and reserve sides he scored in the 2008 final of the FA Youth Cup, which City won, and was joint-fifth top-scorer in the 2008–09 Premier Reserve League and joint-second top-scorer in the 2009–10 Premier Reserve League. He was named as City's Academy Player of the Month for December 2007 and Reserve team Player of the Month for February 2008. He made it onto the first-team bench only once, though this was for the famous Manchester derby game on 20 September 2009 where City lost 4–3 to Manchester United at Old Trafford.

He was loaned out to League One club Swindon Town in July 2010 for six months, in order to gain first team experience. This came despite interest from other clubs. He made his league debut at the County Ground on 7 August 2010, in a 2–1 defeat to Brighton & Hove Albion, but was replaced by Alan O'Brien after sixty minutes for tactical reasons. He was initially played out of position in midfield by manager Danny Wilson and then spent time on the substitutes bench before taking an injured Charlie Austin's place up front in October. He scored his first senior goal on 5 October, as Swindon beat Torquay United 2–0 in the Football League Trophy. He scored a brace eleven days later in a 5–4 defeat at Peterborough United. He was then benched in favour of Charlie Austin and Vincent Péricard, returning to the City of Manchester Stadium in January after scoring a total of three goals in nine starts and 12 substitute appearances for Swindon.

=== Peterborough United ===
Ball signed a 2 1/2-year deal for Darren Ferguson's Peterborough United on 31 January 2011 after being bought for an undisclosed transfer fee. He scored five goals in 21 appearances for "Posh" in the second half of the 2010–11 season, and was a stoppage-time substitute for Lee Tomlin in the League One play-off final as United secured promotion into the Championship with a 3–0 victory over Huddersfield Town.

He was partnered with Tomlin following the sale of Craig Mackail-Smith to Brighton at the start of the 2011–12 season. However Ball returned to League One on loan at Rochdale on 31 August after Peterborough signed Emile Sinclair from Macclesfield Town. He scored four goals in eight games for the "Dale", which led to him being recalled to London Road on 10 October to compete with Paul Taylor and Emile Sinclair for a starting place in the absence of Nicky Ajose (loaned out) and Lee Tomlin (injured). Ball made just five substitute appearances however, and returned to Rochdale on loan on 24 November. His second loan spell at Rochdale was not as successful as his first spell as he failed to find the net in seven games and manager Steve Eyre was sacked. He was put on the transfer-list at Peterborough in April 2012.

=== Fleetwood Town ===
On 23 July 2012, Ball signed for newly promoted League Two side Fleetwood Town on a three-year deal. He started the 2012–13 season playing out of position until manager Micky Mellon was replaced by Graham Alexander in December. He ended the campaign with nine goals in 38 games, before scoring 13 goals from 40 appearances in the 2013–14 season. Fleetwood won promotion out of League Two with a 1–0 victory over Burton Albion in the 2014 play-off final. On 29 March 2015, he scored a goal that was a described as a "spectacular lob" and an "exquisite chip" to secure a 1–1 draw with Preston North End at Highbury Stadium, which later saw him nominated for the FIFA Puskás Award; this made him only the second Englishman to be nominated for the award, after Wayne Rooney in 2011. He scored eight goals in 30 League One games for the "Fishermen" during the 2014–15 campaign.

In August 2015, Ball signed a new two-year contract with Fleetwood. He was limited to five goals in 42 matches in the 2015–16 season, before hitting a career-high 14 goals from 55 matches in the 2016–17 season. He left the "Trawlermen" after rejecting manager Uwe Rösler's new contract offer.

=== Rotherham United ===
On 22 June 2017, Ball signed for Rotherham United on a two-year deal; he said he was persuaded to come to the New York Stadium after hearing manager Paul Warne's ambitious plans. He scored his first goal for Rotherham in an EFL Trophy tie against Manchester City Under-23s on 15 August 2017. He finished the 2017–18 season with nine goals in 38 games for the "Millers" and helped the club to win promotion despite missing a penalty during the 2–1 extra-time win over Shrewsbury Town in the League One play-off final.

On 3 September 2018, Bradford City confirmed the signing of Ball until the end of the 2018–19 season, in a deal that was signed on the loan deadline of 31 August. The deal was confirmed just hours before manager Michael Collins was sacked. He scored his first goal for Bradford in an EFL Trophy tie against Barnsley on 13 November. In December 2018 he was praised by City teammate Hope Akpan, and in May 2019 he was credited by "Bantams" manager Gary Bowyer for helping Lewis O'Brien to develop as a young player. On returning from his loan at Valley Parade, Ball was released by Rotherham at the end of his contract.

=== Wellington Phoenix ===
On 12 July 2019, Wellington Phoenix announced that Ball had signed a two-year contract with the club. He extended his contract for a further 2 years in 2022, with hopes to become a New Zealand citizen and play for New Zealand internationally in 2024, when he has lived in NZ for 5 years.

==== Wellington Phoenix Reserves ====
On 28 September 2024, Ball captained the Wellington Phoenix Reserves in their first New Zealand National League match of the year. Few weeks later, Ball scored his first goal in the National League against Birkenhead United on 27 October.

=== Radcliffe FC ===
In March 2025, Ball joined Radcliffe until the end of the season.

=== FC St Helens ===
In June 2026, Ball signed for NWCFL Premier league side FC St Helens

== Career statistics ==
As of match played 13 January 2025

Appearances and goals by club, season and competition
Club	Season	League			National cup		League Cup		Other		Total	
Club	Season	Division	Apps	Goals	Apps	Goals	Apps	Goals	Apps	Goals	Apps	Goals
Manchester City	2009–10	Premier League	0	0	0	0	0	0	0	0	0	0
Swindon Town (loan)	2010–11	League One	18	2	0	0	1	0	2 (Note: Appearances in the Football League Trophy)	1	21	3
Peterborough United	2010–11	League One	19	5	0	0	0	0	2 (Note: Appearances in the League One play-offs)	0	21	5
Peterborough United	2011–12	Championship	22	4	0	0	2	2	0	0	24	6
Peterborough United	Total		41	9	0	0	2	2	2	0	45	11
Rochdale (loan)	2011–12	League One	14	3	0	0	0	0	1	1	15	4
Fleetwood Town	2012–13	League Two	34	7	2	2	1	0	1	0	38	9
Fleetwood Town	2013–14	League Two	30	8	2	1	1	1	7 (Note: Four appearances in the Football League Trophy and three in the League Two play-offs)	3	40	13
Fleetwood Town	2014–15	League One	32	8	0	0	1	0	1	0	34	8
Fleetwood Town	2015–16	League One	37	4	1	0	1	0	3	1	42	5
Fleetwood Town	2016–17	League One	46	14	5	0	1	0	3 (Note: One appearance in the Football League Trophy and two in the League One play-offs)	0	55	14
Fleetwood Town	Total		179	41	10	3	5	1	15	4	209	49
Rotherham United	2017–18	League One	33	8	1	0	1	0	3 (Note: Two appearances in the Football League Trophy and one in the League One play-offs)	1	38	9
Rotherham United	2018–19	Championship	1	0	0	0	2	0	0	0	3	0
Rotherham United	Total		34	8	1	0	3	0	3	1	41	9
Bradford City (loan)	2018–19	League One	35	5	4	1	0	0	3 (Note: Appearances and goal in the EFL Trophy)	1	42	7
Wellington Phoenix	2019–20	A-League	25	6	1	0	0	0	0	0	26	6
Wellington Phoenix	2020–21	A-League	24	6	0	0	0	0	0	0	24	6
Wellington Phoenix	2021–22	A-League Men	24	2	4	0	0	0	0	0	28	2
Wellington Phoenix	2022–23	A-League Men	24	1	0	0	0	0	0	0	24	1
Wellington Phoenix	2023–24	A-League Men	26	0	1	0	0	0	0	0	27	0
Wellington Phoenix	2024–25	A-League Men	1	0	0	0	0	0	0	0	1	0
Wellington Phoenix	Total		124	15	6	0	0	0	0	0	130	15
Wellington Phoenix Reserves	2024	National League	3	1	— (Note: Ineligible for the New Zealand's National Cup, Chatham Cup, due to having a professional contract.)		0	0	0	0	3	1
Career total			448	84	21	4	11	3	26	8	506	99

== Honours ==
Manchester City

- FA Youth Cup: 2007–08

Peterborough United

- Football League One play-offs: 2011

Fleetwood Town

- Football League Two play-offs: 2014

Rotherham United

- EFL League One play-offs: 2018

Individual

- A-League Men Player of the Month: February 2020
