= Daniel Kearns (footballer) =

Irish footballer

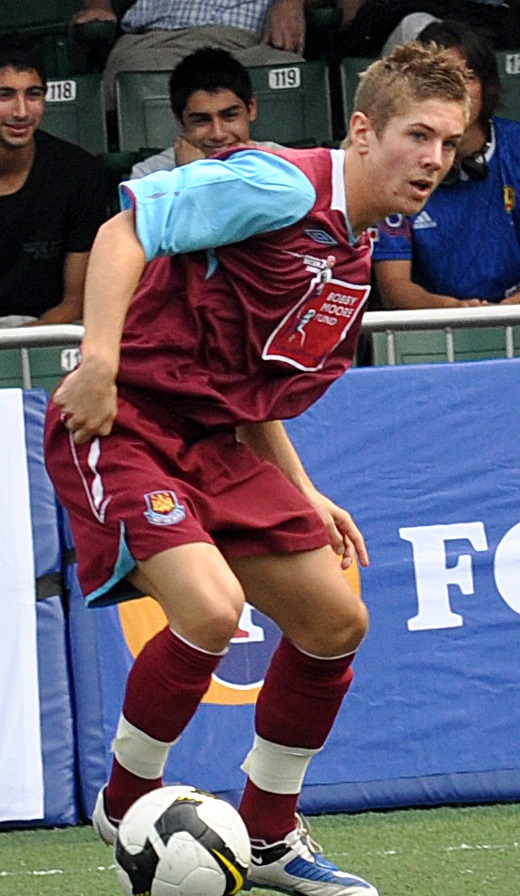
- Kearns playing for West Ham United in 2009

Personal information
- Full name: Daniel Anthony Kearns
- Date of birth: 26 August 1991 (age 35)
- Place of birth: Belfast, Northern Ireland
- Height: 5 ft 10 in (1.78 m)
- Position: Midfielder

Team information
- Current team: Harland & Wolff Welders
- Number: 6

Youth career
- 2007–2010: West Ham United

Senior career*
Years	Team	Apps	(Gls)
2010–2011	Dundalk	37	(4)
2011–2014	Peterborough United	32	(0)
2012	→ York City (loan)	9	(0)
2013	→ Rotherham United (loan)	10	(0)
2014	→ Chesterfield (loan)	10	(0)
2014–2015	Carlisle United	10	(0)
2015–2016	Glenavon	18	(5)
2016–2017	Sligo Rovers	35	(2)
2018	Limerick	13	(1)
2018–2021	Linfield	39	(3)
2021–2022	Cliftonville	42	(2)
2022–2024	Larne	30	(0)
2024–	Harland & Wolff Welders	57	(2)

International career
2007–2008	Northern Ireland U19	5	(0)
2010	Republic of Ireland U19	2	(0)
2010	Republic of Ireland U21	3	(0)
2010	Republic of Ireland U23	1	(0)
2011	League of Ireland XI	1	(0)
- * Club domestic league appearances and goals as of 29 April 2026

Daniel Anthony Kearns (born 26 August 1991) is an Irish professional footballer who plays as a midfielder for Harland & Wolff Welders. Kearns joined Peterborough United from Dundalk in 2011 and had three separate loan spells with clubs across Northern England. He permanently joined Carlisle United after leaving Peterborough, and spent a year there before returning to Ireland, spending his later career at various clubs in the Irish Premiership and League of Ireland.

== Club career ==
=== Early career ===
Born in Belfast, Kearns began his grassroots career in the youth team of his local club St Oliver Plunkett. He joined the youth team of English club West Ham United in July 2007, having been the player of the tournament at the Ballymena International Tournament in 2006. He soon established himself in the under-18 team and went on to spend three years with the club from 2007 to 2010.

After being released by West Ham in May 2010, Kearns signed for Dundalk of the League of Ireland Premier Division in August on a short-term contract. He made his debut in a 1–1 draw with University College Dublin, before going on to make 12 appearances in his first season. Kearns scored his first competitive goals for Dundalk on 14 February 2011 with a hat-trick against Linfield in the Setanta Sports Cup. Kearns played in Dundalk's seven matches in their run to the Setanta Sports Cup Final, where his team lost 2–0 to Shamrock Rovers.

=== Peterborough United ===
Kearns signed a three-year contract with English Championship club Peterborough United on 30 August 2011 for an undisclosed fee. He made his debut for Peterborough on 24 September, in a 1–0 defeat against his former club, West Ham United, coming on as an 89th-minute substitute for Lee Frecklington. He made his first start for Peterborough on 17 December in a 1–0 victory at home to Coventry City and was named man of the match, also playing a part in the buildup to the goal when laid the ball off to Paul Taylor, who assisted with Emile Sinclair's goal. He finished his first season at Peterborough with 21 appearances.

Kearns signed for League Two club York City on 4 October 2012 on a one-month loan, making his debut two days later as a 66th-minute substitute in a 0–0 draw at home to Rotherham United. On 1 November, the loan was extended for another two months. However, he was recalled by Peterborough on 29 November, after making 12 appearances for York. In January 2013, it was confirmed that Bradford City, along with Rotherham and York were interested in signing Kearns. He signed for League Two club Rotherham on 9 January 2013 on loan until the end of the 2012–13 season, making his debut on 13 January as a 51st-minute substitute in a 2–0 home defeat to Barnet. He made 10 appearances for Rotherham as they finished the season as League Two runners-up, earning automatic promotion to League One.

Kearns signed for League Two team Chesterfield on 11 March 2014 on a one-month loan and made his debut that day as a 66th-minute substitute for Jimmy Ryan in a 1–1 draw away to AFC Wimbledon. On 14 April 2014, his loan was extended until the end of the 2013–14 season. He made 10 appearances as Chesterfield won the League Two title and thus promotion to League One.

Kearns was released by Peterborough at the end of the 2013–14 season.

=== Later career ===
He signed a two-year contract with newly relegated League Two club Carlisle United on 11 July 2014. He left the club on 1 September 2015 after his contract was cancelled by mutual consent.

Kearns signed for NIFL Premiership club Glenavon on 17 October 2015. He was previously in the advanced stages of talks with another NIFL Premiership club Linfield after leaving Carlisle, but Linfield were unable to complete the deal. It was against Linfield that Kearns would play his final game for the club, as a late substitute in the 2015–16 Irish Cup Final, which Glenavon won 2–0.

Kearns signed an 18-month contract with League of Ireland Premier Division club Sligo Rovers on 5 July 2016. He signed for League of Ireland Premier Division club Limerick on 29 November 2017 in preparation for the 2018 season. He signed for NIFL Premiership club Linfield on 10 July 2018 on a two-year contract.

In January 2021 Kearns signed for Cliftonville and at the conclusion of his contract he signed for full timers Larne in June 2022

== International career ==
Kearns represented Northern Ireland in a series of UEFA European Under-17 Championship qualifiers in March 2008. However, in 2010 he switched allegiances to the Republic of Ireland, going on to represent them at under-19, under-21 and under-23 levels. The IFA contested the player's decision to switch national allegiances. He was capped once by the League of Ireland XI, playing in their 5–0 defeat to Celtic at the Aviva Stadium on 31 July 2011.

== Career statistics ==
As of match played 27 October 2018

Appearances and goals by club, season and competition
Club	Season	League			National Cup (Note: Includes FAI Cup, FA Cup and Irish Cup)		League Cup (Note: Includes League of Ireland Cup and League Cup)		Other		Total	
Club	Season	Division	Apps	Goals	Apps	Goals	Apps	Goals	Apps	Goals	Apps	Goals
Dundalk	2010	League of Ireland; Premier Division	12	0	0	0	1	0	0	0	13	0
Dundalk	2011	League of Ireland; Premier Division	25	4	2	1	1	0	8 (Note: Seven appearances and four goals in Setanta Sports Cup, one appearance in Leinster Senior Cup)	4	36	9
Dundalk	Total		37	4	2	1	2	0	8	4	49	9
Peterborough United	2011–12	Championship	20	0	1	0	—		—		21	0
Peterborough United	2012–13	Championship	1	0	0	0	0	0	—		1	0
Peterborough United	2013–14	League One	11	0	1	0	1	0	2 (Note: Appearance(s) in Football League Trophy)	0	15	0
Peterborough United	Total		32	0	2	0	1	0	2	0	37	0
York City (loan)	2012–13	League Two	9	0	2	0	—		1	0	12	0
Rotherham United (loan)	2012–13	League Two	10	0	—		—		—		10	0
Chesterfield (loan)	2013–14	League Two	10	0	—		—		—		10	0
Carlisle United	2014–15	League Two	10	0	1	0	1	0	0	0	12	0
Carlisle United	2015–16	League Two	0	0	—		0	0	—		0	0
Carlisle United	Total		10	0	1	0	1	0	0	0	12	0
Glenavon	2015–16	NIFL Premiership	18	5	3	0	—		—		21	5
Sligo Rovers	2016	League of Ireland; Premier Division	14	2	1	0	—		—		15	2
Sligo Rovers	2017	League of Ireland; Premier Division	21	0	1	1	1	0	1 (Note: Appearance in Scottish Challenge Cup)	0	24	1
Sligo Rovers	Total		35	2	2	1	1	0	1	0	39	3
Limerick	2018	League of Ireland; Premier Division	13	1	—		0	0	—		13	1
Linfield	2018–19	NIFL Premiership	13	3	0	0	0	0	—		13	3

== Honours ==
Dundalk

- Setanta Sports Cup runner-up: 2011

Rotherham United

- Football League Two runner-up: 2012–13

Chesterfield

- Football League Two: 2013–14

Glenavon

- Irish Cup: 2015–16

Linfield

- NIFL Premiership: 2018–19
- Northern Ireland Football League Cup: 2018–19
- County Antrim Shield: 2018–19

Cliftonville

- Irish League Cup: 2021–22

Larne

- County Antrim Shield: (2) 2022-23, 2023-24
- NIFL Premiership (2): 2022-23, 2023-24
