= Joe Lewis (footballer, born 1987) =

English association football player

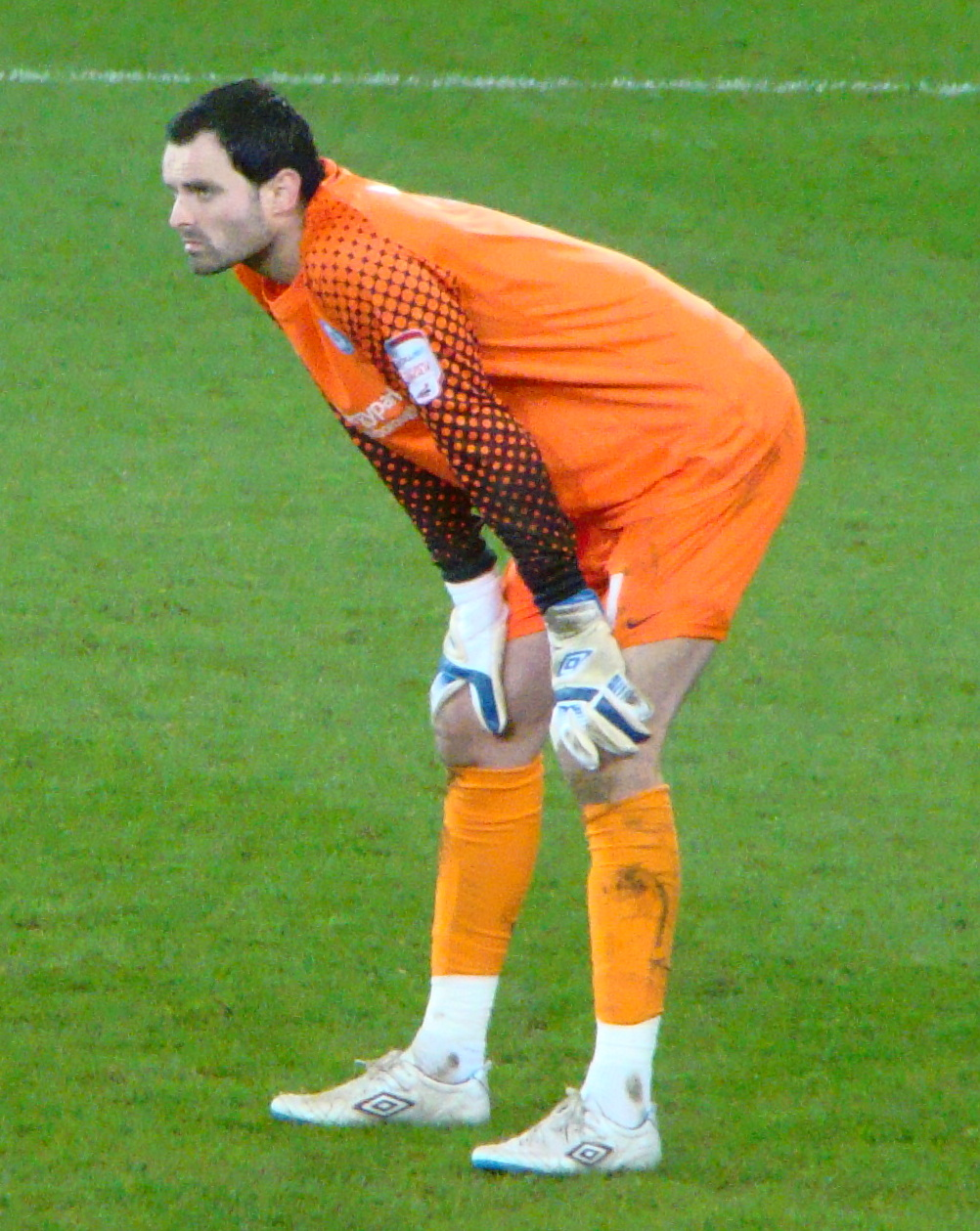
- Lewis playing for Peterborough United in 2012

Personal information
- Full name: Joseph Peter Lewis
- Date of birth: 6 October 1987 (age 39)
- Place of birth: Bury St Edmunds, England
- Height: 6 ft 6 in (1.98 m)
- Position: Goalkeeper

Youth career
- 1995–2003: Norwich City

Senior career*
Years	Team	Apps	(Gls)
2003–2008	Norwich City	0	(0)
2007	→ Stockport County (loan)	5	(0)
2007	→ Morecambe (loan)	19	(0)
2008–2012	Peterborough United	168	(0)
2012–2016	Cardiff City	1	(0)
2014–2015	→ Blackpool (loan)	34	(0)
2015–2016	→ Fulham (loan)	8	(0)
2016–2023	Aberdeen	208	(0)
Total		443	(0)

International career
	England U15	?	(0)
2002–2003	England U16	5	(0)
2003–2004	England U17	6	(0)
2005	England U19	2	(0)
2008–2009	England U21	5	(0)
Medal record
Men's football
Representing England
UEFA European Under-21 Championship
Runner-up	2009
- * Club domestic league appearances and goals

Joseph Peter Lewis (born 6 October 1987) is an English former professional footballer who played as a goalkeeper.

Lewis began his career with Norwich City but did not make a competitive appearance for them, serving loans with Stockport County and Morecambe. In early 2008 he moved to Peterborough United, and was the regular goalkeeper during four seasons in which the club were promoted twice, relegated then promoted again. He lost his place in the team, and in 2012 moved to Cardiff City where he had a backup role and went out on loan to Blackpool and Fulham. In 2016 he moved to Scotland with Aberdeen, being installed as first choice and playing in three cup finals in his first three seasons; he was named captain in 2019.

Lewis represented England at several youth levels up to under-21.

== Club career ==
=== Norwich City ===
Born in Bury St Edmunds, Suffolk, Lewis had been involved with Norwich City's youth system since 1995 at the age of eight. In August 2003 he agreed to join Norwich, the club his family supported, as a scholar at the culmination of his studies at Bungay High School in the summer of 2004. Before reaching 16 he spent time as the Norwich first team's substitute goalkeeper, but did not make an appearance. He turned professional in October 2004, but got no nearer to a first team debut than being named on the bench for portions of 2004–05 and 2005–06. The sale of first-choice goalkeeper Robert Green meant that Lewis became second-choice goalkeeper at Carrow Road before a fractured cheekbone sustained in a reserve team game against Leyton Orient prompted the loan signing of Lee Camp.

==== Loans ====
After an initial trial with Bury, Lewis joined Stockport County on loan in March 2007 for the remainder of the 2006–07 season, playing five games and keeping three clean sheets. He was rewarded with a three-year deal at Norwich, in May 2007. At the beginning of 2007–08, Lewis joined Morecambe on a five-month loan to gain more first-team experience.

=== Peterborough United ===
Lewis signed for Peterborough United on 8 January 2008, for a reported fee of £400,000, breaking the club's record transfer fee. He went on to make his debut against Macclesfield Town on 12 January. At the end of the season Peterborough finished as runners-up in League Two, meaning they were promoted to League One.

His first full season at London Road Stadium resulted in another promotion where the club won promotion to the Championship. On 13 April 2009, Lewis was made to face a penalty three times against Millwall in an unusual refereeing decision. After David Martin of Millwall was tripped and a penalty awarded against Peterborough, Lewis was twice judged by the assistant referee to have moved off his line before the ball had been struck by Gary Alexander – on both occasions Lewis saved the penalty. At the third attempt, Millwall replaced the unsuccessful Alexander with Martin, who scored and this time the penalty stood. Speaking on Sky Sports News after the event, ex-referee Dermot Gallagher commented that whilst the assistant was consistently working to the letter of the law, his decisions were harsh.

However his first season in the Championship wasn't as much of a success which resulted in relegation back down to the third tier. Peterborough started off strongly and Lewis was first choice keeper nearly all the season, however after fracturing his kneecap (and playing a whole half with it fractured) against MK Dons in the play-off semi final, he was forced to miss the second leg and final through injury. Peterborough went on to win promotion, defeating Huddersfield 3–0 in style in the final. During his fifth season at Peterborough, Lewis was replaced as first choice keeper permanently by Paul Jones and only made 12 appearances. His last appearance for the club came on 14 February, in a 3–1 loss at Cardiff City. On 30 April, Lewis was released by the club at the end of his contract, with Cardiff City and Ipswich Town interested in signing him.

=== Cardiff City ===
On 25 May 2012, Lewis agreed a three-year deal at Welsh club Cardiff City, which would commence on 1 July, where he linked up with former Norwich City teammates, Malky Mackay (at the time manager of Cardiff) and David Marshall. He made his debut for the club on 14 August, in a League Cup defeat to Northampton Town, and a second appearance came in the FA Cup exit at Macclesfield Town in January.

Following promotion to the Premier League, Lewis was named in the 25-man squad and made his league debut for the club in a 1–1 draw at Hull City.

==== Blackpool (loan) ====
On 5 August 2014 he joined Blackpool on a season-long loan. He made his debut for the club on 9 August. On 24 January 2015, he was omitted from the line-up to face Watford at Vicarage Road. Blackpool manager Lee Clark initially gave the reason as being a tactical – not monetary – one, but it was later revealed that Blackpool would have to pay his parent club a fee of £40,000 after Lewis had made a certain number of appearances for Blackpool. The payment would entitle Blackpool to sign Lewis permanently at the end of the loan deal. Blackpool attempted to terminate the loan, but the Bluebirds refused.

==== Fulham (loan) ====
On 24 August 2015, Lewis joined Fulham on a season-long loan.

=== Aberdeen ===
On 15 June 2016, Lewis signed for Scottish Premiership club Aberdeen. He made his debut for the club on 30 June 2016, in a Europa League First qualifying round tie against Fola Esch. Lewis started all matches for the Dons in 2016–17, and signed a new deal at the end of the season to keep him at the club until 2020. Lewis continued to play regularly for Aberdeen over the next two seasons, and extended his contract with the club until 2024 in May 2019.

Ahead of the 2019–20 season, Lewis was named as Aberdeen's club captain, replacing Graeme Shinnie in the role following his transfer to Derby County.

Having lost his position as first-choice goalkeeper to Kelle Roos during the 2022–23 season, Lewis left Aberdeen at the season's end after seven years at the club.

From December 2023, Lewis trained with Manchester United.

On 15 October 2024, Lewis announced his retirement from football.

== International career ==
Lewis made his debut for the England under-21s on 15 May 2008, in a friendly against Wales. He replaced Joe Hart at half time and carried through a clean sheet, in a game that saw England win 2–0.

In May 2008, he received a call-up to the senior England squad, replacing an injured Chris Kirkland for the friendlies against USA and Trinidad and Tobago. However, Lewis was an unused substitute for both games.

On 18 August 2008 he started and played for the under-21 England side at Hull City's KC Stadium.

He made his third appearance for the under-21s in a friendly against the Czech Republic only to come off with an ankle injury after 33 minutes. He came on from the bench as a forward in the game against Azerbaijan, replacing Lee Cattermole for the last 15 minutes with England already 6–0 ahead and having used all their outfield substitutes.

== Career statistics ==
As of 13 February 2023

Appearances and goals by club, season and competition
Club	Season	League			National Cup		League Cup		Other		Total	
Club	Season	Division	Apps	Goals	Apps	Goals	Apps	Goals	Apps	Goals	Apps	Goals
Norwich City	2006–07	Championship	0	0	0	0	0	0	—		0	0
Norwich City	2007–08	Championship	0	0	0	0	0	0	—		0	0
Norwich City	Total		0	0	0	0	0	0	0	0	0	0
Stockport County (loan)	2006–07	League Two	5	0	0	0	0	0	0	0	5	0
Morecambe (loan)	2007–08	League Two	19	0	0	0	3	0	0	0	22	0
Peterborough United	2007–08	League Two	22	0	1	0	0	0	0	0	23	0
Peterborough United	2008–09	League One	46	0	5	0	1	0	1 (Note: Appearances in Football League Trophy)	0	53	0
Peterborough United	2009–10	Championship	43	0	1	0	4	0	—		48	0
Peterborough United	2010–11	League One	46	0	4	0	3	0	1	0	54	0
Peterborough United	2011–12	Championship	11	0	1	0	0	0	—		12	0
Peterborough United	Total		168	0	12	0	8	0	2	0	190	0
Cardiff City	2012–13	Championship	0	0	1	0	1	0	—		2	0
Cardiff City	2013–14	Premier League	1	0	0	0	2	0	—		3	0
Cardiff City	2014–15	Championship	0	0	0	0	0	0	—		0	0
Cardiff City	2015–16	Championship	0	0	0	0	0	0	—		0	0
Cardiff City	Total		1	0	1	0	3	0	0	0	5	0
Blackpool (loan)	2014–15	Championship	34	0	1	0	1	0	—		36	0
Fulham (loan)	2015–16	Championship	8	0	0	0	1	0	—		9	0
Aberdeen	2016–17	Scottish Premiership	38	0	5	0	4	0	6 (Note: Appearances in UEFA Europa League)	0	53	0
Aberdeen	2017–18	Scottish Premiership	31	0	2	0	2	0	4	0	39	0
Aberdeen	2018–19	Scottish Premiership	37	0	6	0	4	0	2	0	49	0
Aberdeen	2019–20	Scottish Premiership	30	0	5	0	2	0	6	0	43	0
Aberdeen	2020–21	Scottish Premiership	35	0	2	0	1	0	3	0	41	0
Aberdeen	2021–22	Scottish Premiership	34	0	1	0	1	0	6 (Note: Appearances in the UEFA Europa Conference League)	0	42	0
Aberdeen	2022–23	Scottish Premiership	3	0	1	0	0	0	—		4	0
Aberdeen	Total		208	0	22	0	14	0	27	0	271	0
Career total			443	0	36	0	30	0	29	0	538	0

== Honours ==
Peterborough United

- Football League One runner-up: 2008–09
- Football League One play-offs: 2010–11
- Football League Two runner-up: 2007–08

Aberdeen

- Scottish Cup runner-up: 2016–17
- Scottish League Cup runner-up 2016–17, 2018–19

England U21

- UEFA European Under-21 Championship runner-up: 2009

Individual

- PFA Team of the Year: 2007–08 Football League Two
