= 2011 Football League One play-off final =

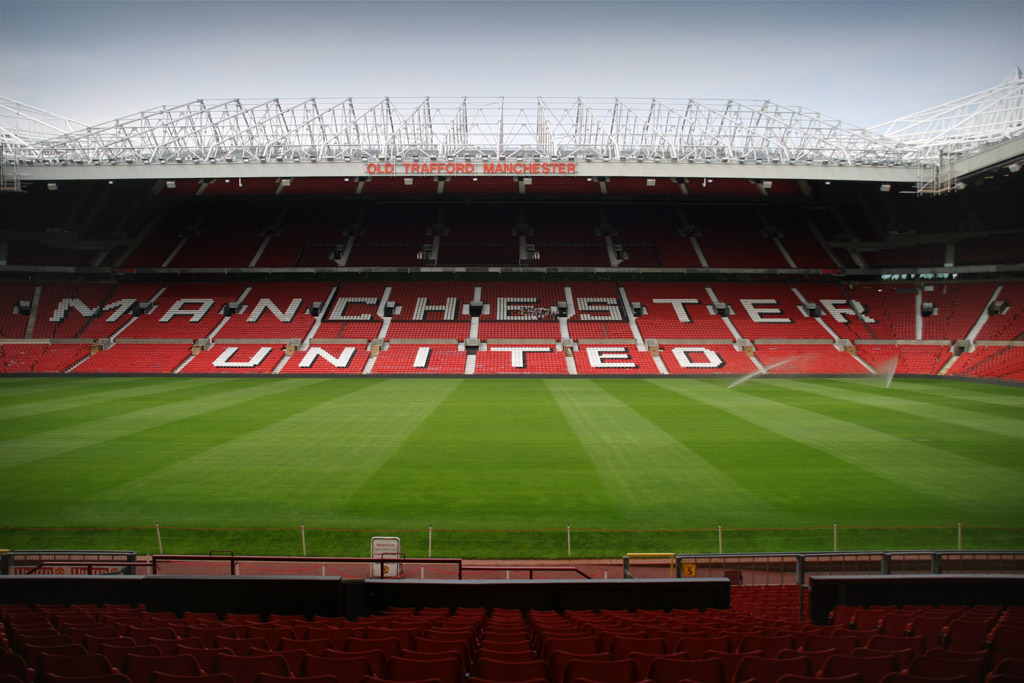
- Old Trafford
- Event: 2010–11 Football League One
Huddersfield Town	Peterborough United
0	3
- Date: 29 May 2011
- Venue: Old Trafford, Manchester
- Referee: Steve Tanner
- Attendance: 48,410

The 2011 Football League One play-off final was an association football match which was played on 29 May 2011 at Old Trafford in Manchester, between Huddersfield Town and Peterborough United, to determine the third and final team to gain promotion from Football League One to the Football League Championship. The top two teams of the 2010–11 Football League One season, Brighton & Hove Albion and Southampton, gained automatic promotion to the Championship, while the teams placed from third to sixth position took part in play-offs. The winners of the play-off semi-finals competed for the final place for the 2011–12 season in the Championship. AFC Bournemouth and Milton Keynes Dons were the defeated semi-finalists, losing to Huddersfield Town and Peterborough United respectively.

Steve Tanner was the referee for the match, which was played in front of 48,410 spectators. Craig Mackail-Smith, League One's leading scorer, went close for Peterborough on several occasions in the first half but it ended goalless. In the 78th minute, Peterborough took the lead as Tommy Rowe headed Grant McCann's free-kick into the Huddersfield net. Mackail-Smith doubled Peterborough's lead within two minutes, his shot deflecting into the goal off Antony Kay. With five minutes remaining, McCann increased the lead with a long-range strike to give Peterborough a 3–0 victory and promotion to the Championship.

Peterborough United ended their next season in 18th place in the Championship, four places and ten points above the relegation zone. Huddersfield Town finished their following season in fourth position in League One and qualified for the 2012 Football League play-offs where they met Sheffield United in the final and won promotion to the Championship after a penalty shootout.

== Route to the final ==
Football League One final table, leading positions
Pos	Team	Pld	W	D	L	GF	GA	GD	Pts
1	Brighton & Hove Albion	46	28	11	7	85	40	+45	95
2	Southampton	46	28	8	10	86	38	+48	92
3	Huddersfield Town	46	25	12	9	77	48	+29	87
4	Peterborough United	46	23	10	13	106	75	+31	79
5	Milton Keynes Dons	46	23	8	15	67	60	+7	77
6	Bournemouth	46	19	14	13	75	54	+21	71

Huddersfield Town finished the regular 2010–11 season in third place in Football League One, the third tier of the English football league system, one place and eight points ahead of Peterborough United. Both therefore missed out on the two automatic places for promotion to the Football League Championship and instead took part in the play-offs to determine the third promoted team. Huddersfield Town finished five points behind Southampton (who were promoted in second place) and eight behind league winners Brighton & Hove Albion.

Peterborough United's opponents for their play-off semi-final were Milton Keynes Dons with the first match of the two-legged tie taking place at Stadium MK in Milton Keynes on 15 May 2011. Craig Mackail-Smith gave the visitors the lead in the 8th minute, scoring after MK Dons goalkeeper David Martin pushed away a strike from Nathaniel Mendez-Laing. In the 47th minute, Daniel Powell levelled the score from close range after a defensive error from Tommy Rowe and three minutes later MK Dons went ahead 2–1 after Sam Baldock's free-kick went through the wall into the Peterborough net. Ángelo Balanta made it 3–1 in the 56th minute after beating Peterborough goalkeeper Paul Jones at the near post. Charlie Lee was then sent off for Peterborough after receiving two yellow cards, the second for a foul on Powell. With nine minutes remaining, Stephen Gleeson was also sent off, for a foul on Mark Little, and Grant McCann converted the subsequent penalty to make the final score 3–2 to MK Dons. The second leg was held four days later at London Road in Peterborough. McCann scored in the 11th minute from a free-kick to put Peterborough into the lead before Mackail-Smith's close-range strike made it 2–0 and sent his side to the final with a 4–3 aggregate victory.

Huddersfield Town faced AFC Bournemouth in the other semi-final; the first leg was played at Dean Court in Bournemouth on 14 May 2011. Midway through the first half, Kevin Kilbane put the visitors ahead with a header from Gary Roberts' cross. Soon after, Rhoys Wiggins was fouled by Huddersfield goalkeeper Ian Bennett, who conceded a penalty. Danny Ings took the spot-kick but Bennett dived to his right to make the save. In the 60th minute, Donal McDermott scored with a shot from around 25 yards (23 metres) to level the match, which ended 1–1. The second leg took place four days later at the Galpharm Stadium in Huddersfield. Lee Peltier gave Huddersfield the lead on 26 minutes from a Roberts corner, but Steve Lovell equalised just before half-time from the penalty spot after Adam Smith was fouled in the Huddersfield penalty area. Danny Ward restored the home side's lead just before half-time with a strike past Bournemouth's goalkeeper Shwan Jalal. Midway through the second half, McDermott's pass found Lovell who rounded Bennett and scored to make it 2–2. With the aggregate score 3–3 at the final whistle, the match went into extra time. Ings scored for Bournemouth from a Marc Pugh cross in the 104th minute but Antony Kay equalised almost immediately with a header from a Roberts corner. Midway through the second period of additional time, Jason Pearce was shown the red card for a foul. The match ended 3–3, and with the scores level at 4–4 on aggregate, a penalty shootout was required to determine who would progress. Michael Symes and Lee Novak scored the opening penalties for Bournemouth and Huddersfield respectively but Liam Feeney's spot-kick was saved by Bennett. Ward made it 2–1 to Huddersfield before Anton Robinson missed his penalty. Kilbane and Shaun Cooper then scored for Huddersfield and Bournemouth respectively, but Kay scored the decider and Huddersfield won the shootout 4–2, progressing to the final.

== Match ==
=== Background ===
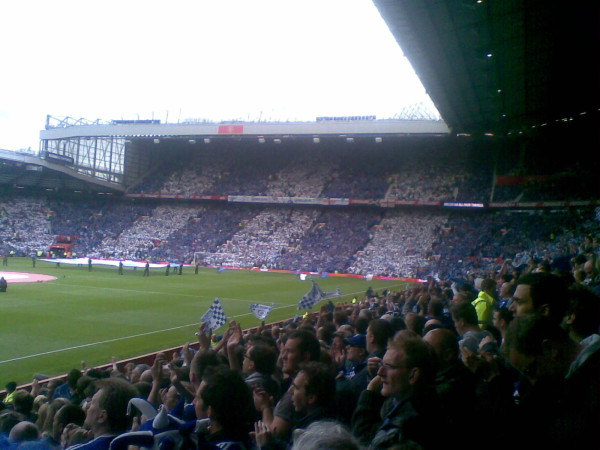
Huddersfield Town fans at Old Trafford

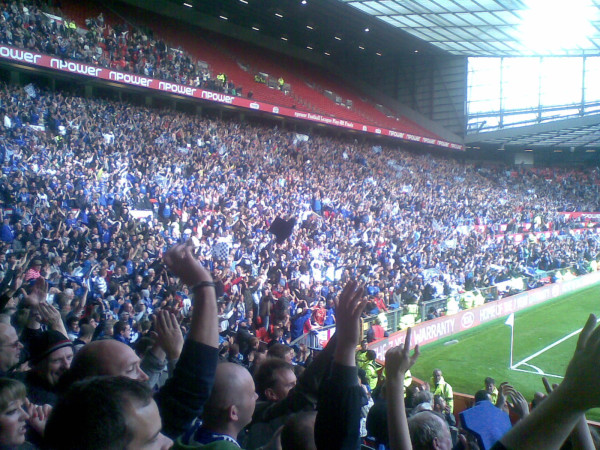
Peterborough United fans celebrate

Due to the 2011 UEFA Champions League Final being held at Wembley Stadium on 28 May 2011, it appeared that the three Football League play-off finals may have to be played at a different venue for the first time since 2007. Manchester United's Old Trafford had been confirmed as a possible alternative, while Arsenal's Emirates Stadium and the Millennium Stadium in Cardiff were also under consideration to host the Championship, League One and League Two play-off finals. It was confirmed in January 2011 that Wembley would host the Championship play-off final on 30 May, while Old Trafford would host the League Two and League One finals on 28 and 29 May respectively.

The match was Huddersfield Town's third play-off final—their previous appearances came in 1995 (a 2–1 win over Bristol Rovers) and 2004 (a 4–1 penalty shootout win over Mansfield Town)—and capped their seventh overall appearance in the Football League play-offs. They had been relegated to the third tier of English football at the end of the 2002–03 season. Peterborough United had also featured in two previous play-off finals, winning the Football League Third Division final in both 1992 (2–1 against Stockport County) and 2000 (1–0 against Darlington). They had been relegated to League One the previous season, finishing bottom of the division and 15 points from safety.

The sides had played each other three times during the season, twice in the league and once in the Football League Trophy. Peterborough won the first league encounter 4–2 at London Road in August 2010; Huddersfield secured a 3–2 victory six weeks later in the cup competition. The second league match took place in April 2011 and ended in a 1–1 draw. This was also the second time the sides had faced one another in the play-offs, with Peterborough winning 4–3 on aggregate in the 1992 semi-finals.

Peterborough's Mackail-Smith was the division's top scorer during the regular season with 32 goals (27 in the league, 2 in the FA Cup and 3 in the League Cup). His side's other leading scorers were George Boyd with 17 (15 in the league and 2 in the League Cup) and Aaron McLean on 13 (10 in the league, 2 in the FA Cup and 1 in the League Cup). Jordan Rhodes was Huddersfield's top scorer with 26 goals (20 in the league, 1 in the FA Cup, 1 in the League Cup and 4 in the Football League Trophy) followed by Anthony Pilkington with 14 (10 in the league and 3 in the Football League Trophy).

The referee for the match was Steve Tanner. He was assisted by Peter Bankes and Charles Breakspear, Mick Russell acted as the fourth official and Seb Stockbridge was reserve assistant referee. The final was broadcast live in the United Kingdom on Sky Sports. Huddersfield adopted a 4–5–1 formation while Peterborough played as a 4–3–2–1.

=== Summary ===
The match kicked off around 3 p.m. on 29 May 2011 at Old Trafford in front of 48,410 spectators. In the fifth minute, Mackail-Smith's shot was deflected by Kay onto the outside of Huddersfield's post from a tackle. Boyd then struck from around 30 yards (27 metres) but his shot was saved by Bennett. For Huddersfield, Peltier headed a Roberts pass over the Peterborough crossbar before Jones caught Clarke's on-target header. Benik Afobe, playing as a lone striker, then missed an opportunity for Huddersfield before Mackail-Smith was denied once again by Kay. Roberts' free-kick was then tipped round the post by Jones before Afobe struck wide from 8 yards (7.3 metres) from the resulting corner. Mackail-Smith then hit a shot wide while unmarked after receiving a pass from Boyd, and the half ended goalless.

The first chance of the second half fell to McCann who struck a curling free-kick over the bar from around 20 yards (18 metres), before Ward's run down the wing ended with his shot striking the Peterborough crossbar. Kay then fouled Mackail-Smith, who was through on goal, and was shown a yellow card. In the 78th minute, Peterborough took the lead as Rowe's header from McCann's free-kick went into the Huddersfield net. In immediate response, Danny Cadamarteri was brought on for Ward as Huddersfield switched to two strikers, but Mackail-Smith doubled Peterborough's lead within two minutes, his shot deflecting into the goal off Kay. With five minutes remaining, McCann increased his side's lead with a long-range strike before Lee Tomlin's shot went over the Huddersfield crossbar. Peterborough won the match 3–0 and were promoted to the Championship.

=== Details ===
29 May 2011
15:00 BST

Huddersfield Town	0–3	Peterborough United
	Report	Rowe 78'; Mackail-Smith 80'; McCann 85'

Old Trafford, Manchester
Attendance: 48,410
Referee: Steve Tanner (Somerset)

Huddersfield Town	Peterborough United

GK	13	Ian Bennett
DF	32	Jack Hunt	(yellow card) 39'
DF	8	Antony Kay	(yellow card) 76'
DF	5	Peter Clarke (c)
DF	3	Gary Naysmith
MF	20	Kevin Kilbane
MF	10	Danny Ward		(substituted off) 79'
MF	2	Lee Peltier	(yellow card) 34'
MF	16	Scott Arfield		(substituted off) 81'
MF	7	Gary Roberts
FW	24	Benik Afobe		(substituted off) 81'
Substitutes:
GK	25	Nick Colgan
DF	18	Jamie McCombe
MF	4	Joey Guðjónsson
FW	9	Danny Cadamarteri		(substituted in) 79'
FW	17	Jordan Rhodes		(substituted in) 81'
FW	19	Alan Lee		(substituted in) 81'
FW	21	Lee Novak
Manager:
Lee Clark

GK	28	Paul Jones
DF	2	Mark Little
DF	5	Gabriel Zakuani
DF	16	Ryan Bennett
DF	27	Grant Basey		(substituted off) 64'
MF	7	James Wesolowski
MF	11	Grant McCann (c)
MF	14	Tommy Rowe		(substituted off) 84'
MF	10	George Boyd
MF	24	Lee Tomlin	(yellow card) 29'	(substituted off) 90+2'
FW	12	Craig Mackail-Smith
Substitutes:
GK	30	Barry Richardson
DF	4	Kelvin Langmead
DF	6	Charlie Lee	(yellow card) 65'	(substituted in) 64'
MF	18	Chris Whelpdale		(substituted in) 84'
MF	19	Nathaniel Mendez-Laing
MF	35	Joe Newell
FW	9	David Ball		(substituted in) 90+2'
Manager:
Darren Ferguson

Match officials:

- Assistant referees:
  - Peter Bankes
  - Charles Breakspear
- Fourth official: Mick Russell

Statistics
	Huddersfield Town	Peterborough United
Total shots	7	9
Shots on target	3	5
Ball possession	44%	56%
Corner kicks	5	4
Fouls committed	13	10
Yellow cards	3	2
Red cards	0	0

== Post-match ==
Darren Ferguson, the Peterborough manager, was quick to praise his chairman, Darragh MacAnthony, noting "he's spent money, had a right go and had the bottle to get me back at the club". He also noted that his father, Manchester United manager Alex Ferguson, had not been present at the final, calling him a "jinx" and jokingly attributing Peterborough's semi-final first-leg loss to MK Dons to him. The Huddersfield manager Lee Clark said that the final score did not tell the whole story of the match: "It was just a crazy eight, ten minutes. For the first half-hour of the second half we dominated, but they had a set-piece expert ... I'm hurting for the owner, for the fantastic supporters".

Peterborough United ended their next season in 18th place in the Championship, four places and ten points above the relegation zone. Huddersfield Town finished their following season in fourth position in League One and qualified for the 2012 Football League play-offs where they met Sheffield United in the final, winning promotion to the Championship after a penalty shootout.
