= Matthew Briggs =

English-born Guyanese footballer (born 1991)

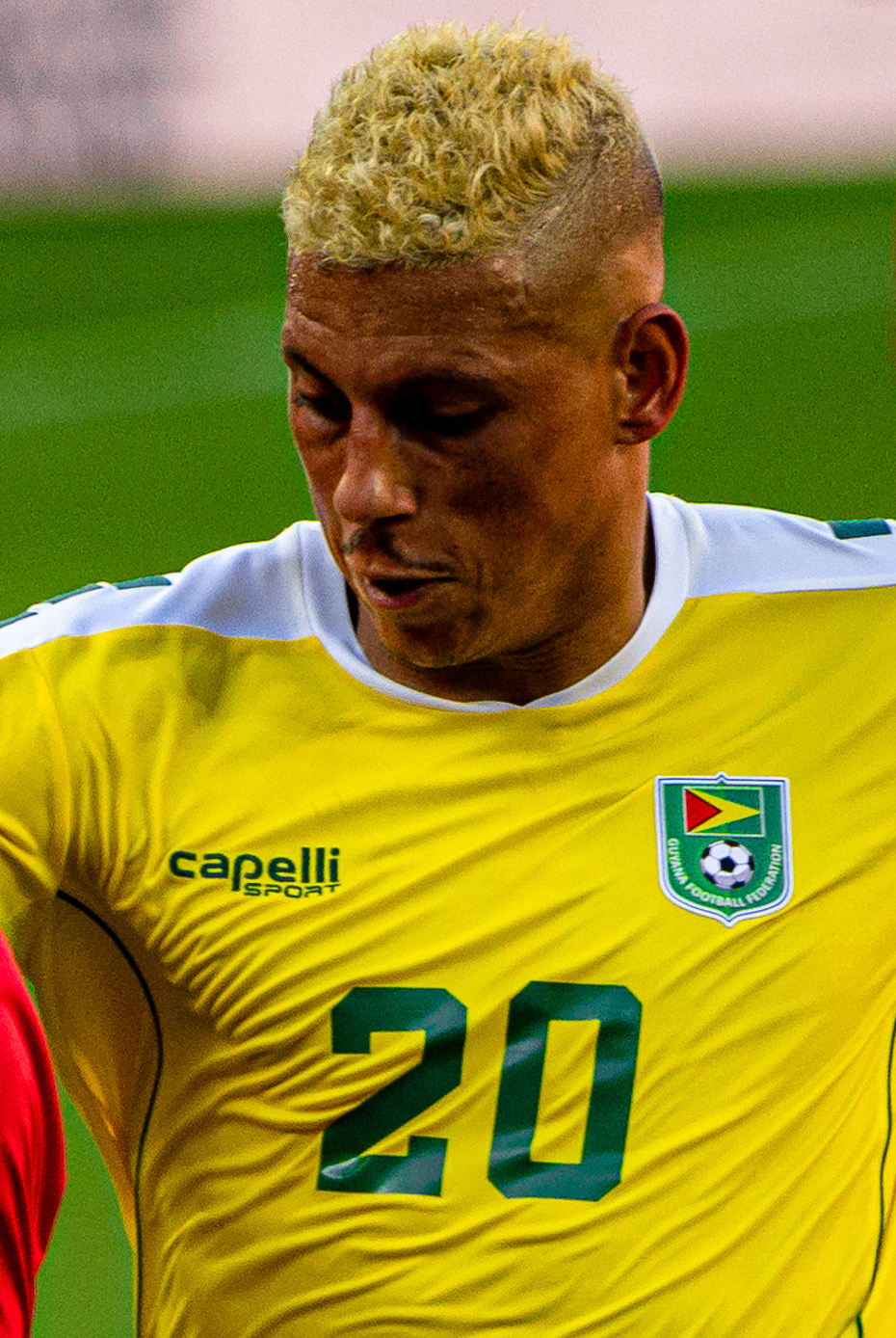
- Briggs with Guyana at the 2019 CONCACAF Gold Cup

Personal information
- Full name: Matthew Anthony Briggs
- Date of birth: 6 March 1991 (age 35)
- Place of birth: Wandsworth, London, England
- Height: 1.83 m (6 ft 0 in)
- Position: Left-back

Youth career
- 2001–2007: Fulham

Senior career*
| Years | Team | Apps | (Gls) |
| 2007–2014 | Fulham | 13 | (0) |
| 2010 | → Leyton Orient (loan) | 1 | (0) |
| 2012 | → Peterborough United (loan) | 5 | (0) |
| 2012 | → Bristol City (loan) | 4 | (0) |
| 2013 | → Watford (loan) | 7 | (1) |
| 2014–2015 | Millwall | 8 | (0) |
| 2015 | → Colchester United (loan) | 18 | (0) |
| 2015–2017 | Colchester United | 41 | (0) |
| 2017–2018 | Chesterfield | 11 | (0) |
| 2018 | Barnet | 1 | (0) |
| 2018–2019 | Maldon & Tiptree | 34 | (5) |
| 2019 | Coggeshall Town | 0 | (0) |
| 2019–2020 | HB Køge | 14 | (0) |
| 2020 | Dartford | 1 | (0) |
| 2020–2021 | Vejle | 3 | (0) |
| 2021–2023 | Gosport Borough | 59 | (2) |
| 2023 | Horsham | 0 | (0) |
| Total | | 220 | (8) |

International career
| 2006 | England U16 | 1 | (0) |
| 2007–2008 | England U17 | 13 | (0) |
| 2008–2010 | England U19 | 12 | (1) |
| 2009 | England U20 | 2 | (0) |
| 2011 | England U21 | 2 | (0) |
| 2015–2022 | Guyana | 17 | (1) |
- * Club domestic league appearances and goals

Matthew Anthony Briggs (born 6 March 1991) is a former professional footballer who played as a left-back. Born in England, he represented the Guyana national team.

Briggs began his career with Fulham, where he progressed through the club's academy from the age of ten. He made his first-team debut in May 2007, becoming the youngest player to play in the Premier League, aged 16 years and 68 days. He made 13 league appearances over eight years with the club, and 30 in all competitions. He had loan spells with a number of Football League clubs, including Leyton Orient, Peterborough United, Bristol City and Watford. He was released by Fulham in 2014, and he joined Championship side Millwall. He found opportunities limited at Millwall, and he was loaned out to League One club Colchester United during the latter half of the 2014–15 season. He was released by Millwall at the end of that season, joining Colchester United on a permanent basis where he remained until May 2017, playing 47 games. He joined Chesterfield in August 2017.

Eligible to represent both England and Guyana, Briggs has represented England at under-16, under-17, under-19, under-20 and under-21 levels, and has represented Guyana at full international level.

== Club career ==
=== Fulham ===
Born in Wandsworth, London, Briggs was spotted by Fulham scouts at the age of ten. Able to play at left-back or the left of midfield, Briggs became a regular in the under-18 side despite still being registered with the under-16s, having put in some impressive performances in his age group. He featured at reserve level before being called up to Lawrie Sanchez's first-team for a trip to Middlesbrough in May 2007. He made his debut in the 3–1 defeat at the Riverside Stadium on 13 May, replacing Moritz Volz after 77 minutes to become the Premier League's youngest ever player at the age of 16 years and 65 days old. Briggs held the record for 12 years, until Harvey Elliott made an appearance, also for Fulham.

After the match, the club's head of youth development, John Murtough, said of Briggs:

Matthew's a good lad and a good athlete. He's come in and hasn't been fazed by anything we've asked of him. It's still early days but he's shown promise in the Reserves – Lawrie Sanchez saw him and rewarded him with an opportunity to travel with the first team.

Briggs later said of the experience:

Lawrie Sanchez said he wanted me to travel with the squad and there was a chance I'd get on. I was buzzing. Going back to school the day after, everyone was like 'oh my God' you've played in the Premier League.

Briggs returned to school the next day to take his GCSE exams.

==== Leyton Orient loan ====
On 16 January 2010, Briggs signed for League One club Leyton Orient in a one-month loan deal that would run until 13 February. He made his first professional appearance in two and a half years on 19 January when he played the full 90 minutes in Orient's 2–0 home win over Yeovil Town. This was to be his only appearance of the season.

==== Return to Fulham ====
On his return to Fulham, Briggs was handed his full debut by manager Mark Hughes in Fulham's 6–0 win against Port Vale in the League Cup at Craven Cottage on 25 August 2010. He played for 58 minutes before being replaced by Stephen Kelly. In the same season, he made his first start in the Premier League during a 1–0 defeat to Chelsea at Stamford Bridge on 10 November. He played in Fulham's 2–1 defeat to Arsenal on 4 December, but was replaced by Chris Baird after just 28 minutes through injury, after which he had an operation on his calf muscles which Mark Hughes hoped Briggs would have fully recovered from in early 2011.

A troublesome ankle injury kept Briggs out of action for longer than expected, but in March 2011, he signed a contract extension to keep him with the club until the summer of 2014.

Under new manager Martin Jol, Briggs believed that the 2011–12 season would be the year that he became a regular starter for the Fulham first-team. With Jol placing an emphasis on a youthful side and Fulham competing in the UEFA Europa League through the Fair Play ranking, Briggs started in the 3–0 Europa League first qualifying round win over Faroese club NSÍ Runavík on 30 June 2011. He scored his first goal on 14 July with the opening goal in Fulham's 3–1 win over Crusaders at Seaview in Belfast.

==== Peterborough United loan ====
After Martin Jol had made Briggs available for loan in late January 2012, he joined Championship side Peterborough United on a month's loan on 7 February 2012. Immediately after making the switch, Briggs admitted that he hoped he would be able to remain with Peterborough until the end of the 2011–12 season. He made his debut on 14 February in Peterborough's 3–1 defeat away to Cardiff City. He played five games during his one-month spell at London Road.

==== Bristol City loan ====
On his return to Fulham, Briggs was told by Jol that he would have to wait his chance in the first-team owing to the form of regular left-back John Arne Riise. Both Peterborough and Watford enquired about Briggs' availability for loan, but Briggs ruled out an exit, saying that he wanted "to fight for the shirt". He started in Fulham's 3–2 defeat to Manchester United in the Premier League on 25 August, before he was loaned to Bristol City for one month on 26 October 2012. He made his debut the next day in a 2–1 home defeat to Hull City. After making four starts for the Championship club, Fulham were prepared to extend Briggs' loan provided the club didn't suffer a further injury crisis, but he instead returned to his parent club after his loan expired.

==== Watford loan ====
Watford signed Briggs on loan until the end of the season on 1 March 2013. He made his debut on 9 March in Watford's 2–1 home defeat by Blackpool. He scored his first professional league goal while with Watford, scoring the final goal in their 4–0 win over Blackburn Rovers on 20 April at Vicarage Road.

Briggs helped Watford reach the play-offs, where he played in both legs of the 3–2 aggregate win over Leicester City, taking the club to Wembley for the final. However, Briggs was an unused substitute as Watford were beaten 1–0 by Crystal Palace, denying them promotion to the Premier League. He made nine appearances for Watford during his loan stay.

After his Watford loan came to an end, Martin Jol planned to loan out Briggs across the course of the 2013–14 season. He made what was to be his last appearance for Fulham on 31 August when he came on as a second-half substitute for Sascha Riether at St James' Park. In a season which Briggs described as "massive for me", he suffered an injury setback, requiring a hernia operation in September 2013.

At the end of the 2013–14 season when Fulham were relegated to the Championship, Briggs was released from the club alongside eight other players. He had spent 13 years at Fulham.

=== Millwall ===
Briggs joined Championship club Millwall on trial in July 2014. He featured in a friendly against Dartford as manager Ian Holloway decided whether to make a move for the player. He also played in a 2–2 friendly draw with Stevenage, while Holloway said that "Briggs is growing on me". Briggs initially rejected the contract offered by Millwall, instead holding talks with Blackpool over a move. He decided against joining Blackpool, and instead signed a one-year deal with Millwall on 1 August 2014. Briggs revealed that his agent had also spoken to Blackburn Rovers and also received a contract offer from Huddersfield Town after spending a few days with the club. He added that his decision was swayed because he "wanted to stay in London as my friends and family are here".

Briggs made his debut on 12 August 2014 at The Den in a League Cup match against Wycombe Wanderers. It was a mixed game for Briggs, scoring on his debut to hand Millwall a 1–0 win, but he was sent off for a second bookable offence after 59 minutes. However, after making his debut, his opportunities in the first-team became limited, with Holloway making changes to his starting line-up, making just 12 appearances from his debut to the middle of January 2015.

==== Colchester United loan ====
On 22 January 2015, Briggs joined League One club Colchester United on loan until the end of the season. He went straight into Colchester's starting line-up in their 2–0 win against Leyton Orient at the Colchester Community Stadium on 24 January. While playing for Colchester, Briggs received a call-up to the Guyana squad to face Grenada in a friendly. Before making his international debut, Briggs was sent-off for the second time in the 2014–15 season when he received a second yellow card during Colchester's 2–2 away draw with Gillingham on 21 March. He made 18 appearances for the U's in the closing stages of the season as he helped the club remain in League One for another season, fending off relegation with a final day victory over promotion hopefuls Preston North End.

Following the expiry of his contract with Millwall, Briggs was released at the end of the 2014–15 season.

=== Colchester United ===
Colchester United signed Briggs on a permanent basis on 22 June 2015. He signed a two-year contract with the club following his loan spell at the end of the 2014–15 season.

He made his second debut for the club in their 2–2 opening day draw with Blackpool on 8 August, playing 79 minutes before being replaced by Kane Vincent-Young. He finished his first full season with the club with 32 first-team appearances to his name.

A hip injury ahead of the 2016–17 season forced Briggs to undergo surgery which would leave him out of action for several months. He made a return to competitive action on 4 February 2017 in Colchester's 1–1 draw at Blackpool. Despite his injury, Briggs finished the campaign with 15 League Two appearances to his name.

On the expiry of his contract, he was not offered a new deal by Colchester and released on 10 May 2017.

In July 2017, Briggs joined Lincoln City on trial.

=== Chesterfield ===
Briggs joined EFL League Two side Chesterfield in August 2017 on a short-term contract. He commuted between Colchester and Chesterfield every day, a 10-hour round trip, while he was caring for his ill partner.

After 11 appearances, manager Jack Lester stated in January 2018 that Briggs was out of contract.

=== Barnet ===
Briggs joined Barnet on 10 March 2018 on a non-contract basis. He made one appearance, at home to Port Vale, but following the departure of Graham Westley new manager Martin Allen announced that Briggs had departed the club as there was not enough room for him due to the size of the squad.

=== Non-League ===
After working on a construction site, Briggs joined Maldon & Tiptree for the 2018–19 season. He won the Player of the Year award in his first season.

=== HB Køge ===
In August 2019 Briggs joined Danish 1st Division side HB Køge, following a brief spell at Coggeshall Town. Briggs was one of the profiles for the club in the first half season. However, Briggs never returned from his winter vacation. In the beginning, it was reported that he would like to have more days off with the family but the club didn't allow this. Afterwards, it was reported that he was on sick leave. However, the club announced on 2 March 2020, that they had terminated his contract by mutual consent.

=== Dartford ===
Briggs joined Dartford on 14 March 2020 for the rest of the 2019–20 season.

=== Vejle BK ===
On 10 September 2020, Briggs returned to Denmark and signed with newly promoted Danish Superliga club Vejle Boldklub after a trial, on a deal until the summer 2022. He made his debut for the side on 30 October 2020 in their 3–0 win against Randers, replacing Wahid Faghir.

After five appearances for the club, Vejle confirmed on 13 July 2021, that Briggs contract had been terminated by mutual consent.

=== Gosport Borough ===
On 23 July 2021, Briggs returned to England to join Southern League Premier Division South side Gosport Borough.

=== Horsham ===
In July 2023, Briggs signed for Isthmian League Premier Division side Horsham. However, he retired from football just one month later.

== International career ==
Briggs is eligible to play for both England and Guyana. He qualifies to play for Guyana through his grandmother.

=== England under-16 ===
Briggs was first called up to the England under-16 squad on 9 November 2006, where he played in England's 3–0 win over Northern Ireland in the Victory Shield. This was his only game for the under-16 side.

=== England under-17 ===
Briggs played the first of 13 appearances for the England under-17s on 8 April 2007 during a 4–1 away win over their Norwegian counterparts. In his 13 games for the under-17s, he featured in sides that won seven, drew five and lost only once, with his final appearance in the age group against Israel on 30 March 2008, a game which ended 2–2.

=== England under-19 ===
Briggs made his debut for the under-19s on 13 October 2008 in a 4–1 European Under-19 Championship qualification defeat by Serbia at The Showgrounds in Newry, Northern Ireland. Briggs was a key member of England's squad that reached the tournament final in Donetsk, Ukraine in 2009. He was a late addition to the squad, having to fly back from Fulham's pre-season tour of Australia to link up with his teammates in Ukraine.

Ahead of the tournament, Briggs had made a substitute appearance in England's 2–1 elite qualification win over Scotland on 1 June 2009 at Bramall Lane, Sheffield. He started in all of England's game en route to the final, including England's 1–1 Group A draw with Switzerland on 21 July, the 2–2 draw with Ukraine on 24 July, and he scored in their 7–1 thrashing of Slovenia on 27 July to secure their place in the semi-final with France. He played in the 3–1 victory on 30 July which put England in the final, which saw a rematch with Ukraine. England finished as runners-up to Ukraine after they were beaten 2–0 in Donetsk.

Briggs made further appearances for the under-19s in the 2010 elite qualifying round in the 1–0 win over Republic of Ireland in Kyiv on 26 May 2010, and the 1–1 draw with Ukraine in Borodyanka on 31 May 2010. Briggs played only once in the finals held in France, starting in England's 3–2 win against Austria on 18 July in Flers, Orne. This was to be his final appearance for the under-19s.

=== England under-20 ===
In September 2009, Briggs travelled with the under-20 team for the FIFA U-20 World Cup in Egypt. He made his debut in the starting line-up of England's 1–0 defeat to Uruguay on 26 September in Ismaïlia. He made his second and final appearance on 2 October in the 1–1 draw with Uzbekistan in Suez.

=== England under-21 ===
Briggs played in two 2013 European Under-21 Championship Group 8 qualifiers in 2011, the first of which was a 6–0 win at Vicarage Road over Azerbaijan on 1 September, and his second and last England under-21 appearance came at Laugardalsvöllur in Reykjavík as England beat Iceland 3–0.

=== Guyana ===
Briggs was called up by the Guyana national team in March 2015 ahead of their friendlies against Saint Lucia and Grenada. He made his full international debut 29 March 2015 as the Golden Jaguars beat Grenada 2–0. After four years away from the national set-up he returned to the Guyana squad for the 2019 CONCACAF Gold Cup. On the 15th of November 2019, Briggs scored his first international goal, tapping in from six yards from an indirect free kick by Kadell Daniel during a CONCACAF Nations League Match.

== Career statistics ==
=== Club ===
Appearances and goals by club, season and competition
| Club | Season | League | | | National Cup | | League Cup | | Europe | | Other | | Total | |
| Club | Season | Division | Apps | Goals | Apps | Goals | Apps | Goals | Apps | Goals | Apps | Goals | Apps | Goals |
|---|---|---|---|---|---|---|---|---|---|---|---|---|---|---|
| Fulham | 2006–07 | Premier League | 1 | 0 | 0 | 0 | 0 | 0 | — | | — | | 1 | 0 |
| Fulham | 2007–08 | Premier League | 0 | 0 | 0 | 0 | 0 | 0 | — | | — | | 0 | 0 |
| Fulham | 2008–09 | Premier League | 0 | 0 | 0 | 0 | 0 | 0 | — | | — | | 0 | 0 |
| Fulham | 2009–10 | Premier League | 0 | 0 | 0 | 0 | 0 | 0 | 0 | 0 | — | | 0 | 0 |
| Fulham | 2010–11 | Premier League | 3 | 0 | 0 | 0 | 1 | 0 | — | | — | | 4 | 0 |
| Fulham | 2011–12 (Note: Soccerbase does not list the UEFA Europa League second leg tie against Dnipro Dnipropetrovsk on 25 August 2011) | Premier League | 2 | 0 | 0 | 0 | 1 | 0 | 12 (Note: Appearance(s) in UEFA Europa League) | 1 | — | | 15 | 1 |
| Fulham | 2012–13 | Premier League | 5 | 0 | 2 | 0 | 1 | 0 | — | | — | | 8 | 0 |
| Fulham | 2013–14 | Premier League | 2 | 0 | 0 | 0 | 0 | 0 | — | | — | | 2 | 0 |
| Fulham | Total | | 13 | 0 | 2 | 0 | 3 | 0 | 12 | 1 | — | | 30 | 1 |
| Leyton Orient (loan) | 2009–10 | League One | 1 | 0 | — | | — | | — | | — | | 1 | 0 |
| Peterborough United (loan) | 2011–12 | Championship | 5 | 0 | — | | — | | — | | — | | 5 | 0 |
| Bristol City (loan) | 2012–13 | Championship | 4 | 0 | — | | — | | — | | — | | 4 | 0 |
| Watford (loan) | 2012–13 | Championship | 7 | 1 | — | | — | | — | | 2 (Note: Appearance(s) in Championship play-offs) | 0 | 9 | 1 |
| Millwall | 2014–15 | Championship | 8 | 0 | 2 | 0 | 2 | 1 | — | | — | | 12 | 1 |
| Colchester United (loan) | 2014–15 | League One | 18 | 0 | — | | — | | — | | — | | 18 | 0 |
| Colchester United | 2015–16 | League One | 26 | 0 | 4 | 0 | 1 | 0 | — | | 1 (Note: Appearance(s) in Football League Trophy) | 0 | 32 | 0 |
| Colchester United | 2016–17 | League Two | 15 | 0 | 0 | 0 | 0 | 0 | — | | 0 | 0 | 15 | 0 |
| Colchester United | Total | | 59 | 0 | 4 | 0 | 1 | 0 | — | | 1 | 0 | 65 | 0 |
| Chesterfield | 2017–18 | League Two | 11 | 0 | 0 | 0 | — | | — | | 1 | 0 | 12 | 0 |
| Barnet | 2017–18 | League Two | 1 | 0 | — | | — | | — | | — | | 1 | 0 |
| Maldon & Tiptree | 2018–19 | Isthmian League Division One North | 34 | 5 | 1 | 0 | — | | — | | 4 (Note: Two appearances one goal in Alan Turvey Trophy; one appearance one goal in FA Trophy; one appearance in Essex Senior Cup) | 2 | 39 | 7 |
| HB Køge | 2019–20 | Danish 1st Division | 14 | 0 | 1 | 0 | — | | — | | — | | 15 | 0 |
| Dartford | 2019–20 | National League South | 1 | 0 | — | | — | | — | | 1 (Note: Appearance(s) in National League South play-offs) | 0 | 2 | 0 |
| Vejle BK | 2020–21 | Danish Superliga | 3 | 0 | 1 | 0 | — | | — | | — | | 4 | 0 |
| Gosport Borough | 2021–22 | Southern League Premier Division South | 37 | 2 | 1 | 0 | — | | — | | 4 (Note: One appearance in Hampshire Senior Cup; three appearances in Portsmouth Senior Cup) | 0 | 42 | 2 |
| Gosport Borough | 2022–23 | Southern League Premier Division South | 22 | 0 | 1 | 0 | — | | — | | 1 (Note: Appearance(s) in Hampshire Senior Cup) | 0 | 24 | 0 |
| Gosport Borough | Total | | 59 | 2 | 2 | 0 | — | | — | | 5 | 0 | 66 | 2 |
| Horsham | 2023–24 | Isthmian League Premier Division | 0 | 0 | 0 | 0 | — | | — | | 0 | 0 | 0 | 0 |
| Career total | | | 220 | 8 | 13 | 0 | 6 | 1 | 12 | 1 | 14 | 2 | 265 | 12 |

=== International ===
Appearances and goals by national team and year
| National team | Year | Apps | Goals |
|---|---|---|---|
| Guyana | 2015 | 1 | 0 |
| Guyana | 2016 | 0 | 0 |
| Guyana | 2017 | 0 | 0 |
| Guyana | 2018 | 0 | 0 |
| Guyana | 2019 | 9 | 1 |
| Guyana | 2020 | 0 | 0 |
| Guyana | 2021 | 5 | 0 |
| Guyana | 2022 | 2 | 0 |
| Total | | 17 | 1 |

Scores and results list Guyana's goal tally first, score column indicates score after each Briggs goal.

List of international goals scored by Matthew Briggs
| No. | Date | Venue | Opponent | Score | Result | Competition |
|---|---|---|---|---|---|---|
| 1 | 15 November 2019 | Synthetic Track and Field Facility, Leonora, Guyana | Aruba | 1–1 | 4–2 | 2019–20 CONCACAF Nations League B |

== Honours ==
England U19

- UEFA European Under-19 Championship runner-up: 2009
