= 2011–12 Peterborough United F.C. season =

Peterborough United
2011–12 season
- Chairman: Darragh MacAnthony
- Manager: Darren Ferguson
- Stadium: London Road Stadium
- Championship: 18th
- FA Cup: Third round
- Football League Cup: Second round
- Top goalscorer: League: Paul Taylor (12); All: Paul Taylor (12)
- Highest home attendance: League: 13,517 vs West Ham United (27 March 2012); All: 13,517 vs West Ham United (27 March 2012)
- Lowest home attendance: League: 6,351 vs Cardiff City (18 October 2011); All: 6,351 vs Cardiff City (18 October 2011)
- Average home league attendance: League: 9,766; All: 9,766
Home colours	Away colours

The 2011–12 season was Peterborough United's 51st season in the Football League, competing in the Football League Championship after being promoted from Football League One, beating Huddersfield Town 3–0 in the Play-off final.

== Squad ==
Note: Flags indicate national team as defined under FIFA eligibility rules; some limited exceptions apply. Players may hold more than one non-FIFA nationality.

No.	Pos.	Nation	Player
1	GK	ENG	Joe Lewis
2	DF	ENG	Mark Little
3	DF	ENG	Matthew Briggs (on loan from Fulham)
4	DF	ENG	Ryan Bennett
5	DF	COD	Gabriel Zakuani
7	FW	ENG	Nicky Ajose (on loan to Chesterfield)
8	MF	ENG	Lee Tomlin
9	FW	ENG	David Ball
10	MF	SCO	George Boyd
11	MF	NIR	Grant McCann (club captain)
12	FW	ENG	Emile Sinclair
13	GK	ENG	Joe Day (on loan to Alfreton Town)
14	MF	ENG	Tommy Rowe
15	FW	ENG	Dave Hibbert
17	MF	ENG	Joe Newell

No.	Pos.	Nation	Player
18	DF	ENG	Shaun Brisley (on loan from Macclesfield Town)
19	GK	ENG	Barry Richardson
20	FW	ENG	Tyrone Barnett (on loan from Crawley Town)
21	MF	IRL	Daniel Kearns
23	MF	IRL	Lee Frecklington
25	MF	ENG	Nathan Ralph (on loan to Kettering Town)
26	FW	ENG	Paul Taylor
27	DF	ENG	Craig Alcock
29	DF	RSA	Kgosi Ntlhe
31	FW	ENG	Jaanai Gordon-Hutton
33	DF	ENG	Peter Grant
34	MF	ENG	Dan Lawlor
44	MF	ENG	Nathaniel Mendez-Laing
—	FW	ENG	Danny Mills (on loan to Kettering Town)
—	DF	ENG	Scott Griffiths (on loan to Rotherham United)

=== Detailed overview ===
No.	Name	Nat.	Place of birth	Date of birth	Club apps.	Club goals	Int. caps	Int. goals	Previous club	Date joined	Fee
1	Joe Lewis	(England)	Broome, Norfolk	6 October 1987	200	0	–	–	Norwich City	8 January 2008	£400,000
2	Mark Little	(England)	Worcester	20 August 1988	53	1	–	–	Wolverhampton Wanderers	30 June 2010	Free
3	Matthew Briggs	(England)	London	9 March 1991	–	–	–	–	Fulham	7 February 2012	Loan
4	Ryan Bennett	(England)	Orsett	6 March 1990	96	7	–	–	Norwich City	31 January 2012	Loan
5	Gabriel Zakuani	(Democratic Republic of the Congo)	Kinshasa	31 May 1986	107	3	1	0	Fulham	1 January 2009	£500,000
7	Nicky Ajose	(England)	Bury	7 October 1991	–	–	–	–	Manchester United	5 July 2011	£300,000
8	Lee Tomlin	(England)	Leicester	12 January 1988	47	11	–	–	Rushden & Diamonds	6 August 2010	Undisclosed
9	David Ball	(England)	Whitefield, Greater Manchester	14 December 1989	21	5	–	–	Manchester City	31 January 2011	Undisclosed
10	George Boyd	(Scotland)	(England) Chatham	2 October 1985	215	60	–	–	Stevenage	1 January 2007	£260,000
11	Grant McCann	(Northern Ireland)	Belfast	14 April 1980	45	13	33	4	Scunthorpe United	24 May 2010	Free
12	Emile Sinclair	(England)	Leeds	29 December 1987	–	–	–	–	Macclesfield Town	31 August 2011	£250,000
13	Joe Day	(England)		13 August 1990	–	–	–	–	Rushden & Diamonds	7 April 2011	Undisclosed
14	Tommy Rowe	(England)	Wythenshawe	24 September 1988	78	9	–	–	Stockport County	1 July 2009	Undisclosed
15	David Hibbert	(England)	Stafford	28 January 1986	12	1	–	–	Shrewsbury Town	31 May 2010	Free
16	Ryan Tunnicliffe	(England)	Bury	30 December 1992	–	–	–	–	Manchester United	1 July 2011	Loan
17	Joe Newell	(England)	Birmingham	15 March 1992	2	0	–	–	N/A	21 April 2011	Trainee
18	Shaun Brisley	(England)	Macclesfield	6 May 1990	-	-	-	-	Macclesfield Town	9 February 2012	Loan
19	Barry Richardson	(England)	Wallsend	5 August 1969	–	–	–	–	Cheltenham Town	3 February 2010	Free
20	Tyrone Barnett	(England)	Birmingham	28 October 1985	–	–	–	–	Crawley Town	21 February 2012	Loan
21	Daniel Kearns	(Republic of Ireland)	Belfast	26 August 1991	–	–	–	–	Dundalk	30 August 2011	Undisclosed
23	Lee Frecklington	(Republic of Ireland)	(England) Lincoln	8 September 1985	57	3	–	–	Lincoln City	15 May 2009	Undisclosed
25	Nathan Ralph	(England)	Great Dunmow	14 February 1993	–	–	–	–	N/A	1 June 2011	Trainee
26	Paul Taylor	(England)	Liverpool	4 October 1987	–	–	–	–	Anderlecht	28 February 2011	Free
27	Craig Alcock	(England)	Truro	8 December 1987	–	–	–	–	Yeovil Town	7 July 2011	Undisclosed
28	Paul Jones	(England)	Snodland	28 June 1986	–	–	–	–	Exeter City	24 June 2011	Free
–	Danny Mills	(England)	Peterborough	27 November 1991	3	0	–	–	Crawley Town	24 July 2009	Undisclosed
–	Scott Griffiths	(England)	London	27 November 1985	21	0	–	–	Dagenham & Redbridge	22 January 2010	Undisclosed

== Friendly matches ==
16 July Friendly	Barnet	2–2	Peterborough United	Barnet, Greater London
15:00 BST	McLeod 1'; Holmes 15'	Report	Frecklington 29'; Tomlin 48'	Stadium: Underhill Stadium; Attendance: 531

20 July Friendly	Notts County	2–3	Peterborough United	Nottingham, Nottinghamshire
19:45 BST	Westcarr 48'; Bencherif 62'	Report	McCann 22'; Rowe 27'; Boyd 37'	Stadium: Meadow Lane; Attendance: 1,248

23 July Friendly	St Neots Town	3–7	Peterborough United	Hunts Post Community Stadium
13:00 BST	Hope 30'; Konuda 33'; Hilliard 55'		Taylor 13'; Boyd 35', 37'; Tomlin 48'; Frecklington 65'; Ajose 90'

26 July Friendly	Crawley Town	2–4	Peterborough United	Broadfield Stadium
15:00 BST	Barnett 27'; Howell 28'	Report	Rowe 43'; Ajose 54'; Ball 70'; Taylor 75'	Attendance: 615

30 July 2011 Friendly	Gillingham	1–2	Peterborough United	MEMS Priestield Stadium
15:00	Lawrence 41'	Report	McCann 79'; Griffiths 88'

=== Championship ===
==== Standings ====
Pos	Team	Pld	W	D	L	GF	GA	GD	Pts
16	Millwall	46	15	12	19	55	57	−2	57
17	Crystal Palace	46	13	17	16	46	51	−5	56
18	Peterborough United	46	13	11	22	67	77	−10	50
19	Nottingham Forest	46	14	8	24	48	63	−15	50
20	Bristol City	46	12	13	21	44	68	−24	49

Updated to match(es) played on 28 April 2012. Source: BBC Sport
Rules for classification: 1) points; 2) goal difference; 3) number of goals scored.

==== Results summary ====
Overall								Home						Away					
Pld	W	D	L	GF	GA	GD	Pts	W	D	L	GF	GA	GD	W	D	L	GF	GA	GD
46	13	10	23	67	82	−15	49	10	3	10	42	41	+1	3	7	13	25	41	−16

Last updated: 28 April 2012.

==== Results ====
6 August 2011 1	Peterborough United	2–1	Crystal Palace	London Road Stadium
15:00	McCann 58'; Ball 73'		33' Scannell

14 August 2011 2	Blackpool	2–1	Peterborough United	Bloomfield Road
15:00	Phillips 44' 48'		82' Boyd

17 August 2011 3	Millwall	2–2	Peterborough United	The Den
19:45	Trotter 32'; Bouazza 55'		72' Frecklington; 75' Taylor

20 August 2011 4	Peterborough United	7–1	Ipswich Town	London Road Stadium
17:20	Taylor 30' 40'; Tomlin 38' 42' 90+3'; McCann 48' (pen.) 56'		23' Andrews

27 August 2011 5	Brighton & Hove Albion	2–0	Peterborough United	Falmer Stadium
15:00	Noone 10'; Harley 64'

10 September 2011 6	Peterborough United	0–1	Hull City	London Road Stadium
15:00 BST			McLean 47'

17 September 2011 7	Peterborough United	2–1	Burnley	London Road Stadium
15:00 BST	Emile Sinclair 3', 38'

24 September 2011 8	West Ham United	1–0	Peterborough United	Boleyn Ground
19:45 BST	Noble 11' (pen.)

27 September 2011 9	Portsmouth	2–3	Peterborough United	Fratton Park
15:00 BST	Zakuani 8'; Benjani 54'		Frecklington 4', 21'; Huseklepp 90+5' (o.g.)

1 October 2011 10	Peterborough United	1–2	Doncaster Rovers	London Road Stadium
15:00 BST	McCann 19'		Stock 55'; Bennett 67'

15 October 2011 11	Bristol City	1–2	Peterborough United	Ashton Gate Stadium
15:00 BST	Elliott 82'		Boyd 51'; Tomlin 72'

18 October 2011 12	Peterborough United	4–3	Cardiff City	London Road Stadium
19:45 BST	Boyd 21'; McCann 24', 87' (pen.); Taylor 90+2'		Cowie 6'; Whittingham 60'; Gunnarsson 79'

22 October 2011 13	Peterborough United	2–3	Leeds United	London Road Stadium
15:00 BST	Zakuani 23'; Tomlin (red card) 37'; Little 88'		Keogh 4'; Clayton 54'; O'Dea 90+5'

29 October 2011 14	Watford	3–2	Peterborough United	Vicarage Road
15:00 BST	Yeates 5'; Sordell 31' (pen.), 33'		Frecklington 15'; Sinclair 39'

1 November 2011 15	Southampton	2–1	Peterborough United	St Mary's Stadium
19:45 GMT	Chaplow 14'; Hooiveld 17'		Sinclair 76'

5 November 2011 16	Peterborough United	3–2	Derby County	London Road Stadium
15:00 GMT	Taylor 37'; Rowe 51'; McCann 90+3'		Robinson 28', 32'

19 November 2011 17	Birmingham City	1–1	Peterborough United	St Andrew's
15:00 GMT	King 22'		McCann 61'

26 November 2011 18	Peterborough United	1–1	Middlesbrough	London Road Stadium
15:00 GMT	Taylor 81'		Bates 54'

29 November 2011 19	Reading	3–2	Peterborough United	Madjeski Stadium
19:45 GMT	Church 27'; Le Fondre 78'; Robson-Kanu 80'		Rowe 16'; Sinclair 90'

3 December 2011 20	Peterborough United	3–4	Barnsley	London Road Stadium
15:00 GMT	Boyd 64'; Bennett 68'; Frecklington 70'		O'Brien 17'; Butterfield 45+1'; Vaz Tê 55'; Davies 78'	Attendance: 8,320

10 December 2011 21	Leicester City	1–1	Peterborough United	King Power Stadium
15:00 GMT	Gallagher 56'		Tomlin 71'	Attendance: 25,948

17 December 2011 22	Peterborough United	1–0	Coventry City	London Road Stadium
15:00 GMT	Sinclair 66'			Attendance: 8,062

26 December 2011 23	Nottingham Forest	0–1	Peterborough United	City Ground
15:00 GMT			Boyd 20'	Attendance: 24,376

31 December 2011 24	Middlesbrough	1–1	Peterborough United	Riverside Stadium
15:00 GMT	McDonald 51'		Rowe 87'	Attendance: 18,899

2 January 2012 25	Peterborough United	1–1	Birmingham City	London Road Stadium
15:00 GMT	Sinclair 1'		King 90+4'	Attendance: 11,167

14 January 2012 26	Hull City	1–0	Peterborough United	Kingston Communications Stadium
15:00 GMT	Koren 27'			Attendance: 18,074

21 January 2012 27	Peterborough United	1–2	Brighton & Hove Albion	London Road Stadium
15:00 GMT	Ball 72'		Buckley 32', 88'	Attendance: 9,474

28 January 2012 28	Peterborough United	0–3	Portsmouth	London Road Stadium
15:45 GMT			Huseklepp 5', 79'; Pearce 40'	Attendance: 7,555

4 February 2012 29	Burnley	1–1	Peterborough United	Turf Moor
15:00 GMT	Rodriguez 87'		Taylor	Attendance: 13,258

14 February 2012 30	Cardiff City	3–1	Peterborough United	Cardiff City Stadium
19:45 GMT	Whittingham 34'; Gestede 38'; Vučkić 40'		Taylor 90'	Attendance: 21,342

18 February 2012 31	Peterborough United	3–0	Bristol City	London Road Stadium
15:00 GMT	Tomlin 7', 84'; Ball 62'			Attendance: 7,004

25 February 2012 32	Doncaster Rovers	1–1	Peterborough United	Keepmoat Stadium
15:00 GMT	Barnes 45'		Barnett 90+2'	Attendance: 10,375

3 March 2012 33	Crystal Palace	1–0	Peterborough United	Selhurst Park
15:00 GMT	Jedinak 76'			Attendance: 18,559

6 March 2012 34	Peterborough United	0–3	Millwall	London Road Stadium
19:45 GMT			Bouazza 5'; Keogh 70'; Kane 89'	Attendance: 6,392

10 March 2012 35	Peterborough United	3–1	Blackpool	London Road Stadium
15:00 GMT	Barnett 27'; Taylor 43'; Boyd 86'		Dicko 80'

17 March 2012 36	Ipswich Town	3–2	Peterborough United	Portman Road
15:00 GMT	Leadbitter 15'; Murphy 77'; Cresswell 85'		Barnett 34'; Sinclair 83'

20 March 2012 37	Peterborough United	3–1	Reading	London Road Stadium
19:45 GMT	Boyd 25'; Barnett 34'; Taylor 82'		Hunt 20'

24 March 2012 38	Barnsley	1–0	Peterborough United	Oakwell
15:00 GMT	Cotterill 24'; Doyle (red card) 32'

27 March 2012 39	Peterborough United	0–2	West Ham United	London Road Stadium
19:45 UTC			Vaz Tê 51'; O'Neil 57'

31 March 2012 40	Peterborough United	1–0	Leicester City	London Road Stadium
15:00 UTC	Taylor 60'

7 April 2012 41	Coventry City	2–2	Peterborough United	Ricoh Arena
15:00 UTC	McDonald 26'; McSheffery 45' (pen.)		Sinclair 3', 76'

9 April 2012 42	Peterborough United	0–1	Nottingham Forest	London Road Stadium
15:00 UTC			Blackstock 38'; McCleary (red card) 70'

14 April 2012 43	Leeds United	4–1	Peterborough United	Elland Road
15:00 UTC	Paynter 45', 73'; McCormack 47', 48'		Newell 38'

17 April 2012 44	Peterborough United	1–3	Southampton	London Road Stadium
19:45 UTC	Rowe 86'		Hooiveld 5'; Sharp 10', 57'

21 April 2012 45	Peterborough United	2–2	Watford	London Road Stadium
15:00 UTC	Tomlin 14' (pen.); Taylor 54'		Deeney 26'; Murray 48'

28 April 2012 46	Derby County	1–1	Peterborough United	Pride Park Stadium
12:30 UTC	Robinson 21'		Ball 82'

=== League Cup ===
9 August 2011 R1	Stevenage	3–4 (a.e.t.)	Peterborough United	Lamex Stadium
19:45	Long 32'; Bostwick 80'; Beardsley 117'		Ball 16', 65'; Boyd 96'; Tomlin 120+1' (pen.)	Attendance: 2,414

23 August 2011 R2	Peterborough United	0–2	Middlesbrough	London Road Stadium
19:45			4' Robson; 27' Hines	Attendance: 5,012; Referee: Gibbs

=== FA Cup ===
8 January 2012 3	Peterborough United	0–2	Sunderland	London Road Stadium
15:30	Bennett (yellow card) 90'	Report	Larsson 48'; McClean 58'; Cattermole (yellow card) 88'	Attendance: 8,954; Referee: Martin Atkinson

== Player statistics ==
=== Appearances and goals ===
As of 29 April 2012

No.	Pos	Nat	Player	Total		Championship		FA Cup		League Cup	
No.	Pos	Nat	Player	Apps	Goals	Apps	Goals	Apps	Goals	Apps	Goals
1	GK	(England) ENG	Joe Lewis	12	0	11+0	0	1+0	0	0+0	0
2	DF	(England) ENG	Mark Little	37	1	26+8	1	0+1	0	2+0	0
5	DF	(Democratic Republic of the Congo) COD	Gabriel Zakuani	42	1	40+0	1	1+0	0	1+0	0
7	FW	(England) ENG	Nicky Ajose	2	0	1+1	0	0+0	0	0+0	0
8	MF	(England) ENG	Lee Tomlin	40	9	31+6	8	1+0	0	2+0	1
9	FW	(England) ENG	David Ball	24	6	6+16	4	0+0	0	1+1	2
10	FW	(Scotland) SCO	George Boyd	48	8	45+0	7	1+0	0	2+0	1
11	MF	(Northern Ireland) NIR	Grant McCann	42	8	38+3	8	0+0	0	1+0	0
12	FW	(England) ENG	Emile Sinclair	29	10	14+14	10	1+0	0	0+0	0
13	GK	(England) ENG	Joe Day	0	0	0+0	0	0+0	0	0+0	0
14	MF	(England) ENG	Tommy Rowe	45	4	39+3	4	1+0	0	2+0	0
15	FW	(England) ENG	Dave Hibbert	0	0	0+0	0	0+0	0	0+0	0
17	MF	(England) ENG	Joe Newell	15	1	8+6	1	0+1	0	0+0	0
18	DF	(England) ENG	Shaun Brisley	11	0	11+0	0	0+0	0	0+0	0
20	FW	(England) ENG	Tyrone Barnett	13	4	12+1	4	0+0	0	0+0	0
21	MF	(Republic of Ireland) IRL	Daniel Kearns	19	0	5+13	0	0+1	0	0+0	0
23	MF	(Republic of Ireland) IRL	Lee Frecklington	39	5	35+2	5	0+0	0	2+0	0
25	MF	(England) ENG	Nathan Ralph	0	0	0+0	0	0+0	0	0+0	0
26	FW	(England) ENG	Paul Taylor	47	12	36+8	12	1+0	0	1+1	0
27	DF	(England) ENG	Craig Alcock	44	0	40+1	0	1+0	0	1+1	0
28	GK	(England) ENG	Paul Jones	37	0	35+0	0	0+0	0	2+0	0
29	DF	(South Africa) RSA	Kgosi Ntlhe	2	0	0+2	0	0+0	0	0+0	0
35	MF	(England) ENG	Charlie Coulson	1	0	0+1	0	0+0	0	0+0	0
Players featured for club who have left:
	DF	(Wales) WAL	Grant Basey	4	0	2+1	0	0+0	0	1+0	0
	DF	(England) ENG	Ryan Bennett	35	1	32+0	1	1+0	0	2+0	0
	DF	(England) ENG	Matthew Briggs	5	0	5+0	0	0+0	0	0+0	0
	DF	(England) ENG	Ben Gordon	2	0	0+1	0	0+0	0	0+1	0
	DF	(England) ENG	Tom Kennedy	8	0	6+2	0	0+0	0	0+0	0
	MF	(England) ENG	Ryan Tunnicliffe	29	0	10+16	0	1+0	0	1+1	0
	DF	(England) ENG	Scott Wootton	14	0	7+4	0	1+0	0	1+1	0

=== Goalscorers ===
N	P	Name	Championship	FA Cup	League Cup	Total
26	FW	Paul Taylor	12	0	0	12
12	FW	Emile Sinclair	10	0	0	10
8	FW	Lee Tomlin	8	0	1	9
10	MF	George Boyd	7	0	1	8
11	MF	Grant McCann	8	0	0	8
9	FW	David Ball	4	0	2	6
23	MF	Lee Frecklington	5	0	0	5
20	FW	Tyrone Barnett	4	0	0	4
14	MF	Tommy Rowe	4	0	0	4
4	DF	Ryan Bennett	1	0	0	1
2	DF	Mark Little	1	0	0	1
17	MF	Joe Newell	1	0	0	1
5	DF	Gabriel Zakuani	1	0	0	1
Totals			65	0	4	69

=== Disciplinary record ===
No.	Pos.	Name	Championship		FA Cup		League Cup		Total	
No.	Pos.	Name	Yellow card	Red card	Yellow card	Red card	Yellow card	Red card	Yellow card	Red card
23	MF	Lee Frecklington	5	1	0	0	0	0	5	1
8	FW	Lee Tomlin	5	1	0	0	0	0	5	1
11	FW	Grant McCann	7	0	0	0	0	0	7	0
27	DF	Craig Alcock	5	0	0	0	0	0	5	0
~~4~~	DF	Ryan Bennett	3	0	1	0	1	0	5	0
10	MF	George Boyd	5	0	0	0	0	0	5	0
26	FW	Paul Taylor	5	0	0	0	0	0	5	0
14	MF	Tommy Rowe	4	0	0	0	0	0	4	0
5	DF	Gabriel Zakuani	3	0	0	0	1	0	4	0
29	MF	Kgosi Ntlhe	2	0	0	0	0	0	2	0
~~6~~	DF	Scott Wootton	2	0	0	0	0	0	2	0
20	FW	Tyrone Barnett	1	0	0	0	0	0	1	0
3	DF	Matthew Briggs	1	0	0	0	0	0	1	0
18	DF	Shaun Brisley	1	0	0	0	0	0	1	0
21	MF	Daniel Kearns	1	0	0	0	0	0	1	0
~~30~~	DF	Tom Kennedy	1	0	0	0	0	0	1	0
2	DF	Mark Little	1	0	0	0	0	0	1	0
17	MF	Joe Newell	1	0	0	0	0	0	1	0
12	FW	Emile Sinclair	1	0	0	0	0	0	1	0
Total			53	2	1	0	2	0	57	2

=== Penalties ===
Date	Penalty taker	Scored	Opponent	Competition
9 August	Lee Tomlin	Penalty scored	Stevenage	League Cup Round 1
20 August	Grant McCann	Penalty scored	Ipswich Town	Championship Match 4
18 October	Grant McCann	Penalty scored	Cardiff City	Championship Match 12

==== Suspensions served ====
Date	Matches Missed	Player	Reason	Opponents Missed
22 October	3	Lee Tomlin	(red card) vs Leeds United	Watford (A), Southampton (A), Derby County (H)
1 November	1	Lee Frecklington	(red card) vs Southampton	Derby County (H), Birmingham City (A), Middlesbrough (H)

== Transfers ==
=== In ===
No.	Pos.	Nat.	Name	Age	EU	Moving from	Type	Transfer window	Ends	Transfer fee	Source
13	GK	(England)	Day	20	EU	Rushden & Diamonds	Transfer	Summer	2015	Undisclosed	BBC Sport
28	GK	(England)	Jones	24	EU	Exeter City	Transfer	Summer	2013	Free	BBC Sport
7	FW	(England)	Ajose	19	EU	Manchester United	Transfer	Summer	2015	£300,000	BBC Sport
27	DF	(England)	Alcock	23	EU	Yeovil Town	Transfer	Summer	2014	Undisclosed	Sky Sports
21	MF	(Republic of Ireland) (Northern Ireland)	Kearns	20	EU	Dundalk (Republic of Ireland)	Transfer	Summer	2014	Undisclosed	Sky Sports
12	FW	(England)	Sinclair	23	EU	Macclesfield Town	Transfer	Summer	2014	£250,000	Peterborough United

- Total spending: ▼ ~ £550,000+

Notes
^{1}Although officially undisclosed, The Evening Telegraph reported the fee to be £300,000.

=== Loans in ===
No.	Pos.	Name	Country	Age	Loan club	Started	Ended	Start source	End source
16	MF	Tunnicliffe	(England)	33	Manchester United	1 July	29 February	BBC Sport	
6	DF	Wootton	(England)	20	Manchester United	1 July	23 January	BBC Sport	The Posh Site
20	DF	Thompson	(England)	20	Celtic	9 August	18 January	Sky Sports	The Posh Site
18	DF	Gordon	(England)	20	Chelsea	18 August	2 January	BBC Sport	Soccerbase
30	DF	Kennedy	(England)	26	Leicester City	30 September	1 January	Sky Sports	
4	DF	Bennett	(England)	21	Norwich City	31 January	29 February	BBC Sport	Evening News
3	DF	Briggs	(England)	35	Fulham	7 February	7 March	BBC Sport	
18	DF	Brisley	(England)	22	Macclesfield Town	9 February	30 June	BBC Sport	
20	FW	Barnett	(England)	26	Crawley Town	21 February	30 June	BBC Sport	

Sources: For loan start source see "Start source". For loan end source see "End source".
EU = if holds or not a European Union passport; Country: when 2 flags, 1st flag = country that plays for internationally, 2nd flag = country of birth; No. = number on jersey; P = Position (for position name, pause mouse pointer on abbreviation); Name = Name on jersey (for more extensive name, pause mouse pointer on name); In/Out = In: The player came in on loan, Out: The player went out on loan; Loan club = the club that the player moved on loan to or the club that the player came from on loan; Started = the date when the player's loan started; Ended = the date when the player's loan ended.

=== Out ===
No.	Pos.	Name	Country	Age	Type	Moving to	Transfer window	Transfer fee	Apps	Goals	Source
17	DF	Nana	(England) (Ghana)	21	Free Transfer	Northampton Town	Summer	Free	16	0	BBC Sport
21	MF	Davies	(Wales)	27	Released	Northampton Town	Summer	Free	28	1	BBC Sport
—	MF	Green	(England)	21	Released	Dagenham & Redbridge	Summer	Free	31	2	BBC Sport
18	MF	Whelpdale	(England)	24	Transfer	Gillingham	Summer	Undisclosed	143	13	Gillingham F.C.
12	FW	Mackail-Smith	(England)	27	Transfer	Brighton & Hove Albion	Summer	£2.5m^{1}	212	99	BBC Sport
6	DF	Lee	(England)	25	Transfer	Gillingham	Summer	Undisclosed	177	16	Gillingham F.C.
	FW	Howe	(England)	24	Transfer	Torquay United	Summer	Free	15	1	BBC Sport
	MF	Geohaghon	(England)	26	Free Transfer	Barnet	Summer	Free	19	1	BBC Sport
21	MF	Wesolowski	(Australia)	23	Free Transfer	Oldham Athletic	Summer	Free	39	2	BBC Sport
18	DF	Piergianni	(England)	19	Free Transfer	Stockport County	Summer	Free	1	0	BBC Sport
3	DF	Basey	(Wales)	23	Transfer	Wycombe Wanderers	Winter	Free	13	1	The Posh Site
24	DF	Langmead	(England)	26	Free Transfer	Northampton Town	Winter	Free	41	4	The Posh Site
4	DF	Bennett	(England)	21	Transfer	Norwich City	Winter	£3.2m^{2}	96	7	BBC Sport

EU = if holds or not a European Union passport; Country: when 2 flags, 1st flag = country that plays for internationally, 2nd flag = country of birth; N = number on jersey; P = Position (for position name, pause mouse pointer on abbreviation); Name = Name on jersey (for more extensive name, pause mouse pointer on name); Age = age on the day of the signing; Moving from = only indicate the club the player was playing before start playing for this club in this season, for the type of the moving see Status column; Moving to = only indicates the club the player is going to play next, for the type of the moving see Status column; Ends = when the player's current contract ends; n/a = Not applicable.

- Total income: ▲ ~ £5,700,000+

Notes

^{1}Although officially undisclosed The Evening Telegraph reported the transfer fee was £2.5 million.

^{2}Although officially undisclosed The Evening Telegraph reported the transfer fee was £3.2 million.

=== Loans outs ===
No.	Pos.	Name	Country	Age	Loan club	Started	Ended	Start source	End source
—	FW	Mills	(England)	20	Tamworth	8 August	1 January	BBC Sport	Soccerbase
24	DF	Langmead	(England)	26	Northampton Town	9 August	5 January	Sky Sports	The Posh Site
	FW	Ball	(England)	21	Rochdale	31 August	12 October	BBC Football	BBC Sport
	DF	Griffiths	(England)	26	Crawley Town	8 September	1 January 2012	BBC Football	Soccerbase
7	FW	Ajose	(England)	20	Scunthorpe United	22 September	29 November	BBC Sport	Soccerbase
13	GK	Day	(England)	36	Alfreton Town	6 October	30 June	BBC Sport	The Posh Site
3	DF	Basey	(Wales) (England)	23	Wycombe Wanderers	6 October	31 December	BBC Sport	Soccerbase
	DF	Griffiths	(England)	40	Rotherham United	10 January	30 June	The Posh Site	
	FW	Mills	(England)	35	Kettering Town	13 January	30 June	The Posh Site	
25	DF	Ralph	(England)	33	Kettering Town	13 January		The Posh Site	

Sources: For loan start source see "Start source". For loan end source see "End source".
EU = if holds or not a European Union passport; Country: when 2 flags, 1st flag = country that plays for internationally, 2nd flag = country of birth; No. = number on jersey; P = Position (for position name, pause mouse pointer on abbreviation); Name = Name on jersey (for more extensive name, pause mouse pointer on name); In/Out = In: The player came in on loan, Out: The player went out on loan; Loan club = the club that the player moved on loan to or the club that the player came from on loan; Started = the date when the player's loan started; Ended = the date when the player's loan ended.

=== Contracts ===
No.	Pos.	Nat.	Name	Age	Status	Contract length	Expiry date	Source
5	DF	(Democratic Republic of the Congo)	Zakuani	25	✓ Signed	3 years	June 2014	BBC Sport
4	DF	(England)	Bennett	21	✓ Signed	4 years	June 2015	BBC Sport
14	MF	(England)	Rowe	22	✓ Signed	3 years	June 2014	BBC Sport
23	MF	(Republic of Ireland) (England)	Frecklington	26	✓ Signed	1.5 years	June 2014	BBC Sport
17	MF	(England)	Newell	18	✓ Signed	4 years	June 2016	The Posh Site
10	MF	(Scotland) (England)	Boyd	26	✗ Rejected	Undisclosed	Undisclosed	The Posh Site
26	FW	(England)	Taylor	24	✗ Rejected	4 years	June 2015	BBC Sport
28	GK	(England)	Jones	25	✗ Rejected	Undisclosed	Undisclosed	Sky Sports

== Overall summary ==
=== Summary ===
Games played	49 (46 Championship, 1 FA Cup, 2 League Cup)
Games won	14 (13 Championship, 0 FA Cup, 1 League Cup)
Games drawn	11 (11 Championship, 0 FA Cup, 0 League Cup)
Games lost	24 (22 Championship, 1 FA Cup, 1 League Cup)
Goals scored	70 (66 Championship, 0 FA Cup, 4 League Cup)
Goals conceded	84 (77 Championship, 2 FA Cup, 5 League Cup)
Goal difference	-14
Clean sheets	4 (4 Championship, 0 FA Cup, 0 League Cup)
Yellow cards	57 (53 Championship, 2 FA Cup, 2 League Cup)
Red cards	2 (2 Championship, 0 FA Cup, 0 League Cup)
Worst discipline	5 (yellow card) , 1 (red card) Lee Frecklington & Lee Tomlin
Best result	7–1 vs Ipswich Town
Worst result	0–3 vs Portsmouth & Millwall
Most appearances	Ryan Bennett (34)
Top scorer	12, Paul Taylor
Points	50

=== Competition summary ===
Competition	Started round	Current position / round	Final position / round	First match	Last match
2011–12 Football League Championship	—	18th		6 August 2011	28/29 April 2012
2011–12 Football League Cup	1st Round	—	2nd Round	9 August 2011	24 August 2011
FA Cup	3rd round	—	3rd round	8 January 2012	8 January 2012

Updated to match played 24 August 2011
Source: Competitions
