= Emile Sinclair =

English footballer

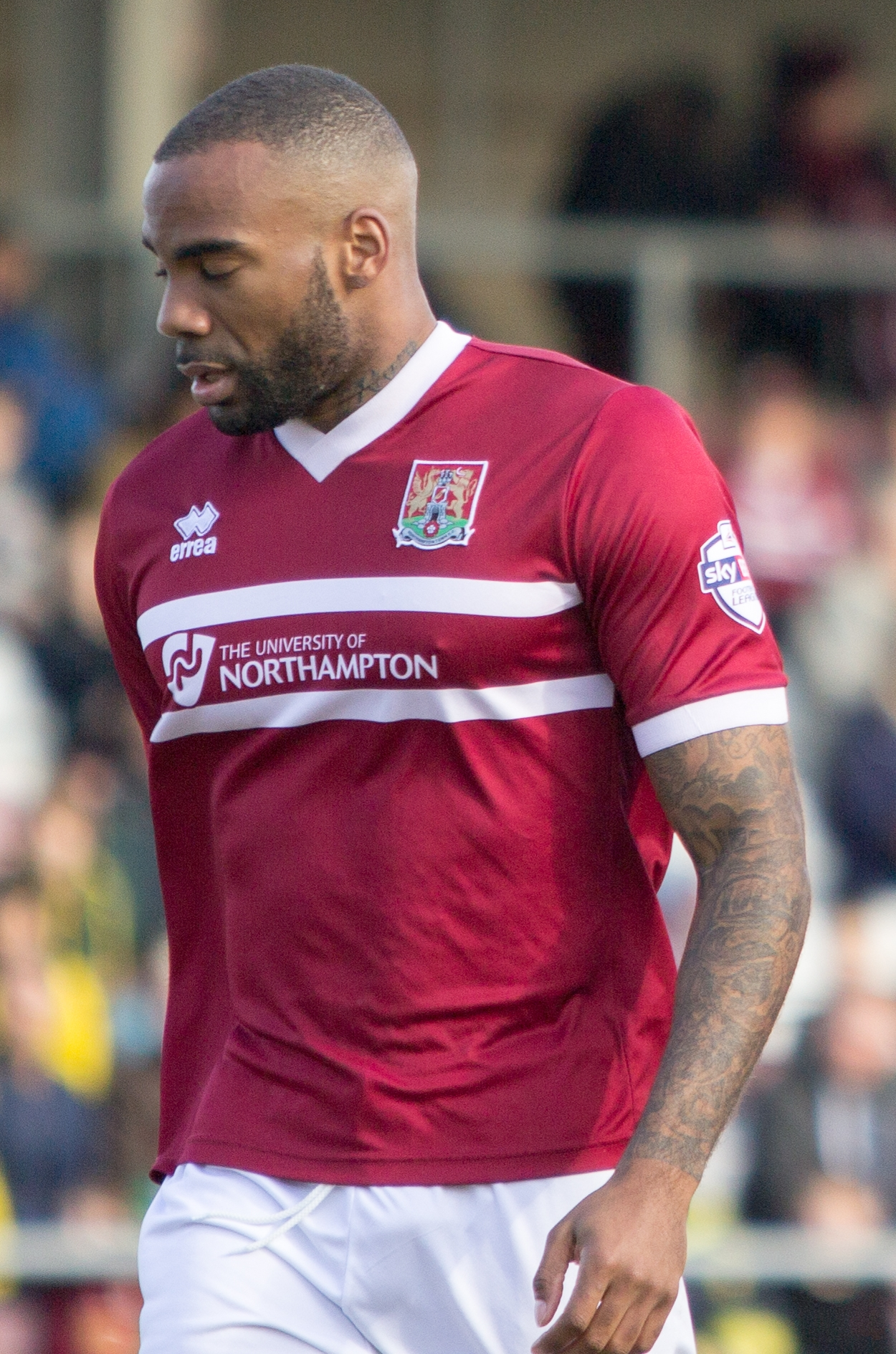
- Sinclair playing for Northampton Town in 2014

Personal information
- Full name: Emile Anthony Sinclair
- Date of birth: 29 December 1987 (age 38)
- Place of birth: Leeds, England
- Height: 6 ft 0 in (1.83 m)
- Position: Striker

Youth career
- 2005–2006: Bradford City
- 2006–2007: Nottingham Forest

Senior career*
Years	Team	Apps	(Gls)
2007–2009	Nottingham Forest	15	(1)
2007–2008	→ Brentford (loan)	4	(0)
2008	→ Mansfield Town (loan)	10	(4)
2009	→ Macclesfield Town (loan)	17	(1)
2009–2011	Macclesfield Town	78	(13)
2011–2013	Peterborough United	47	(13)
2012	→ Barnsley (loan)	4	(0)
2013	→ Doncaster Rovers (loan)	4	(0)
2013–2014	Crawley Town	15	(2)
2014	→ Northampton Town (loan)	20	(2)
2014–2015	Northampton Town	10	(1)
2015–2016	York City	24	(2)
2016	→ Guiseley (loan)	11	(2)
2016	Altrincham	4	(1)
2016–2017	Bradford Park Avenue	28	(3)
2017	Scarborough Athletic	5	(4)
2017–2018	Ossett Town	4	(1)
2018	Goole		
2018–2020	Liversedge		
- * Club domestic league appearances and goals as of 10:52, 20 February 2020 (UTC)

Emile Anthony Sinclair (born 29 December 1987) is an English semi-professional footballer who plays as a striker.

== Career ==
=== Nottingham Forest ===
Born in Leeds, West Yorkshire, Sinclair started his career with Bradford City's youth system in 2005 before being released and signing for Nottingham Forest in 2006. The forward was given chances, along with other young players, in Forest's 2007 pre-season.

Sinclair made his professional debut away at Chester City in the first round of the League Cup. He came on as a substitute in extra time and went on to score the winning penalty in the penalty shootout.

He made his League debut with a brief appearance at Swansea City. He scored his first professional goal after netting the last of Forest's 4–0 victory against Gillingham, just two minutes after coming on as a substitute for hat-trick man Junior Agogo. Following this run of form, the 19-year-old was rewarded with a new two-year deal at the City Ground club on 2 October 2007.

On 22 November 2007, Sinclair joined Brentford on a one-month loan deal. His debut was in a 7–0 loss against to Peterborough United. He was dropped onto the bench and made his other three appearances as a substitute. His loan spell ended on 2 January 2008. He netted two goals in the reserves upon his return and returned to the first team days later as he came off the bench in Forest's 4–0 victory over Leyton Orient. He helped The Reds finish second in the 2007–08 season in League One, gaining promotion to the Championship.

With The Reds gaining promotion, manager Colin Calderwood has commented that he will be given the chance to impress next season after Forest's promotion to the Championship in the upcoming 2008–09 campaign.

On 16 October, he joined Conference Premier club Mansfield Town on loan, scoring on his debut against Wrexham. His impressive display at the club soon led Mansfield Town extending his loan until 17 January 2009. He went on to score five goals in 15 appearances on loan with Mansfield before returning to Forest.

After his loan spell at Macclesfield Town ended, Sinclair was involved in the first team against Ipswich Town as a substitute and replaced Joe Garner at half-time, but lost 2–1. After the match was concluded, Manager Billy Davies criticised Sinclair's performance by stating he was no where near from being a first team player.

At the end of the 2008–09 season, it was announced in May 2009 that Sinclair was released by Nottingham Forest.

=== Macclesfield Town ===
Sinclair joined Macclesfield Town on loan on 15 January 2009 on a one-month loan deal. After making his debut against Aldershot Town on 21 January 2009, Sinclair scored his Macclesfield Town goal on 24 January 2009, in a 2–0 win over Brentford. With six appearances and scoring once, Sinclair made his return to his parent as a result of loan spell expired at Macclesfield Town. After playing game for Nottingham Forest, Sinclair made his return to the club, where he went on to make eleven appearances. Sinclair was keen to join Macclesfield Town on a permanent basis.

After a successful loan spell out the club, it was announced on 22 May 2009 that Sinclair had signed a permanent one-year deal. Sinclair made his Macclesfield Town debut, in the opening match of the season, in a 0–0 draw against Northampton Town. It took until on 29 September 2009 for Sinclair to score his first goal after signing for the club on a permanent basis, in a 1–1 draw against Burton Albion. Sinclair scored a brace, in a 3–1 win over Hereford United on 12 December 2009 and then scored against Hereford United for the third time this season, in a 2–0 win on 6 March 2010. Sinclair scored three more goals against Bradford City, Barnet and Chesterfield. Sinclair progressed through the 2009/10 season, making 42 appearances and scoring 7 goals. He signed a new two-year contract with the club, keeping him at the end of the 2011/12 season.

In the 2010–11 season, Sinclair started well when he scored his first goal of the season, in a 1–1 draw against Chesterfield on 28 August 2010. Sincalir's second goal came on 25 September 2010, in a 3–1 win over Torquay United. His performance was subjected to transfer bid, only for the club to reject it. Unfortunately, Sinclair suffered a hamstring injury that kept him out for four weeks. After returning to training, Sinclair made his return to the first team, in a 1–0 win over Bradford City on 20 November 2010. Despite being sent-off in a 1–0 loss against Wycombe Wanderers on 26 February 2011, which saw him miss three match, Sinclair scored three goals later in the 2010–11 season: twice against Burton Albion and once against Gillingham.

At the start of the 2011–12 season, Sinclair scored twice, in the first round of League Cup, in a 2–0 win over Hull City and scored again in the second round of League Cup, in a 2–1 loss against Bolton Wanderers. Three days later, Sinclair scored his first league goal of the season, in a 4–0 win over Wimbledon. His goal scoring form for the seven matches attracted further interests from clubs, as Macclesfield Town were determined to keep the hold of Sinclair.

=== Peterborough United ===
Sinclair signed for Peterborough United on 31 August 2011. Peterborough paid an undisclosed fee for the striker, who signed a three-year contract with the club. He believed his pace, power and goals abilities could see him fit in at the club.

Sinclair made his Peterborough United debut, coming on as a substitute for Paul Taylor in the 59th minute, in a 1–0 loss against Hull City, just month after scoring them in the League Cup. In the next match, Sinclair scored a brace on his debut start in a 2–1 home victory against Burnley with both goals. By November, Sinclair scored three goals in fourteen matches against Watford, Southampton and Reading. On 17 December he started against Coventry City at home, Paul Taylor picked up the ball with 20 minutes remaining and found Sinclair in the box, Sinclair guided the ball into the top corner, the match finished 1–0. Sinclair scored his first 2012 goal for the club, in a 1–1 draw against Birmingham City. But soon after, Sinclair find himself in a pecking order following a new signing of Tyrone Barnett. As a result, Championship's rival Coventry City and other clubs made a bid for him, but this was rejected by Peterborough United. Weeks after the bid was rejected, Sinclair scored his first goal in two months, in a 3–2 loss against Ipswich Town. Then on 7 April 2012, Sinclair scored twice, in a 2–2 draw against Coventry City. However, Sinclair suffered ankle injury during a match against Nottingham Forest and was out for the rest of the 2011–12 season. Despite this, he helped the club survive relegation to stay in the Championship next season, as he scored ten times in thirty-five appearances.

In the 2012–13 season, Sinclair scored his first goals of the 2012–13 season with a hat-trick in a 3–1 win at Hull City on 29 September. These goals helped Peterborough to their first points of the season, Peterborough were the only team in all 4 divisions without a point. After the match, Sinclair described scoring a hat-trick as "incredible". Sinclair continued to be in the first team at Peterborough United until Sinclair was transfer-listed following a breach of club discipline, along with three other players. Sinclair was previously placed on the transfer list over contract negotiation that yet responded from the player. Rotherham United and Barnsley were keen to sign Sinclair and Barnett on loan, but the attempt to sign the pair were rejected by Peterborough United.

On 20 November, he signed for Barnsley on loan until 19 January 2013. Sinclair made his Barnsley debut, where he came on as a substitute for Marcus Tudgay in the 81st minute, in a 2–1 loss against Cardiff City on 24 November 2012. After making four appearances for the club, Sinclair's loan spell at Barnsley ended abruptly.

Shortly after his loan spell with Barnsley came to an end, Sinclair signed for Doncaster Rovers on loan until the end of the season on 5 January 2013. Upon moving to the club, Manager Brian Flynn believed Sinclair could play a vital of helping the club's attempt to get promoted to Championship. He made his debut immediately, starting in the match against Colchester on 5 January, being subbed in 67th minute as manager Dean Saunders chose to bolster the midfield. However, he only made four appearances, and he spent most of his career at Doncaster Rovers on the bench.

Ahead of the 2013–14 season, Sinclair started his Peterborough United return when he scored the winning goal in a 1–0 win over Queens Park Rangers. Following this, Sinclair said he determined to fight for his first team place. However, after appearing the first five matches as an unused substitute, the club and unnamed League One club made an agreement for Sinclair.

=== Crawley Town ===
Sinclair signed for League One club Crawley Town on 29 August 2013 on a two-year contract for a £100,000 fee. He made his debut when he came on as a substitute for Billy Clarke in the 90th minute of a 3–2 loss against Gillingham on 7 September 2013. Two weeks later on 21 September 2013, Sinclair scored his first Crawley Town goal, in a 1–1 draw against Colchester United. After the match, Sinclair said he determined to impress Manager Richie Barker following his first goal for the club. His second goal for the club then came on 19 October 2013, in a 1–0 win over Bradford City. Sinclair's third goal came on 8 October 2013, in a 3–2 loss against Newport County in the second round of Football League Trophy. Sinclair scored his fourth goal of the season, in a 2–1 win over Hednesford Town.

However, Sinclair struggled to score goals regularly, as he scored four times, which he said he fallen out of football. Sinclair was allowed to leave the club in the January transfer window. Mansfield Town, who he played in 2008, were keen to sign Sinclair, but decided against over issues.

=== Northampton Town ===
On 31 January 2014, Sinclair joined League Two club Northampton Town on loan for the remainder of the season. The options included with a view to a two-year contract.

The next day on 1 February, Sinclair made his Northampton Town debut, coming on as a substitute for Alan Connell in the 57th minute, in a 1–1 draw against Cheltenham Town. His performance saw him named the Northampton Town Player of the Month for February. Two weeks later on 11 February 2014, Sinclair scored his first goals, in a 2–1 win over Torquay United. Sinclair went on to make twenty appearances and scoring two times.

In the 2014–15 season, Sinclair suffered a groin injury that kept him out for weeks and soon regained his fitness. Upon returning to training, the club was considering selling Sinclair after finding himself in the pecking order following new signings. Sinclair made his first appearance of the season, where he came on as a substitute in the 58th minute and scored a late equaliser, in a 1–1 draw against Shrewsbury Town. Sinclair then suffered ankle injury that kept him out for a month. Sinclair continued to have injury plagued when he suffered a hamstring injury.

Sinclair was released by Northampton on 19 January 2015, just six months into a two-year deal.

=== York City ===
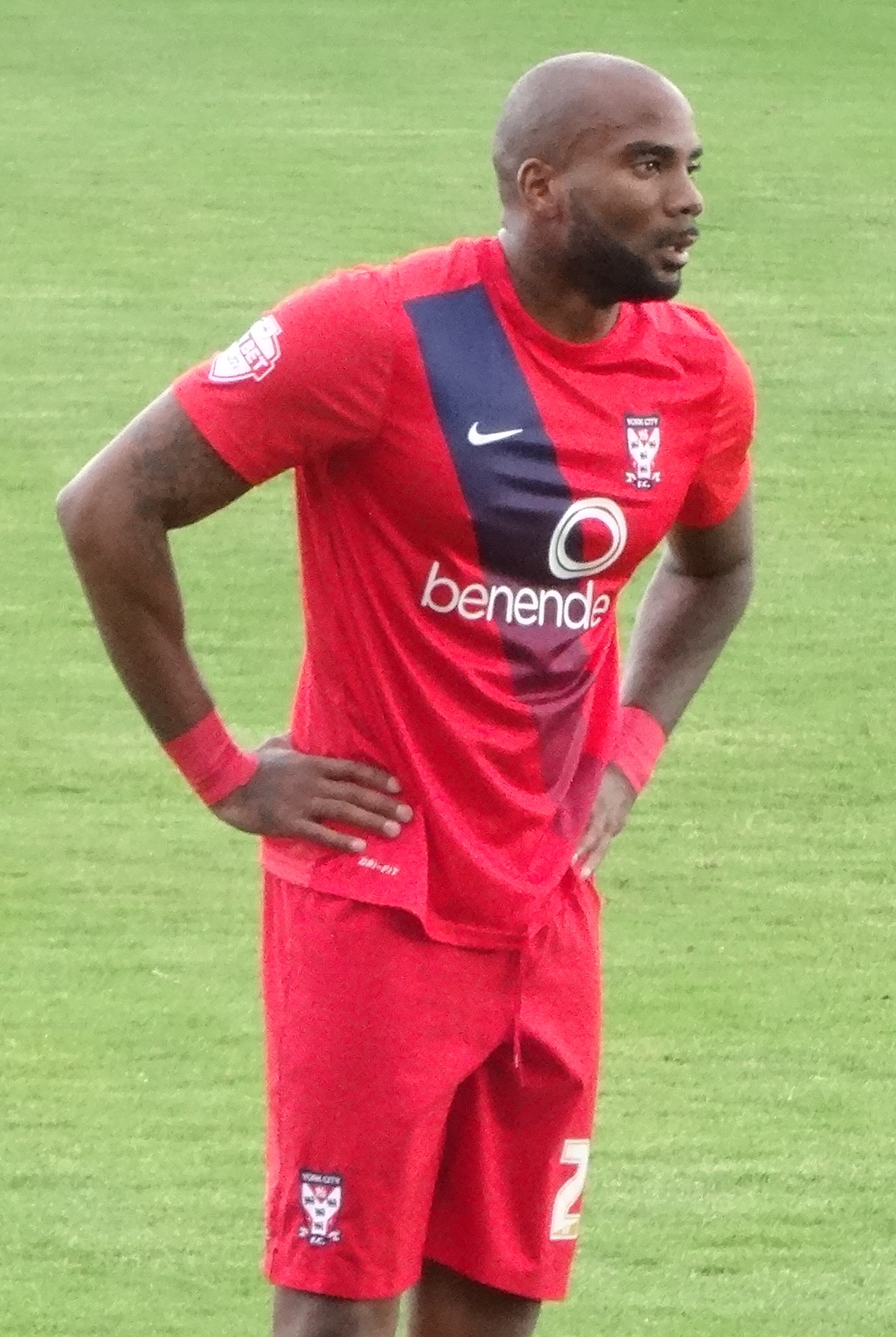
Sinclair playing for York City in 2015

On 20 January 2015, Sinclair signed for League Two club York City on a one-and-a-half-year contract. Following his move to the club, Sinclair determined to score more goals for York City. Four days later, Sinclair made a quick impact when he scored in a 1–1 draw against Burton Albion. Three weeks later on 10 February 2015, Sinclair scored his second goal for the club, in a 2–2 draw against Luton Town. But unfortunately, Sinclair went on to make twelve appearances and scoring two times after suffering a thigh injury he sustained in the 14th minute and was substituted in the 14th minute against Accrington Stanley.

On 1 February 2016, Sinclair joined National League club Guiseley on a one-month loan. He made 13 appearances and scored two goals as Guiseley finished the 2015–16 National League in 20th place. Sinclair was released by York when his contract expired at the end of 2015–16.

=== Later career ===
In August 2016, Sinclair signed for National League North club Altrincham. He signed for their divisional rivals Bradford Park Avenue on 14 September 2016. He was released at the end of 2016–17.

On 9 June 2017, Sinclair signed for Northern Premier League Division One North club Scarborough Athletic. He signed for another Northern Premier League Division One North club, Ossett Town, in October 2017. He moved on to Goole in January 2018. Sinclair moved to Liversedge in late December 2018.

== Career statistics ==
As of match played 11 November 2017

Appearances and goals by club, season and competition
Club	Season	League			FA Cup		League Cup		Other		Total	
Club	Season	Division	Apps	Goals	Apps	Goals	Apps	Goals	Apps	Goals	Apps	Goals
Nottingham Forest	2007–08	League One	12	1	0	0	1	0	1 (Note: Appearance in Football League Trophy)	0	14	1
Nottingham Forest	2008–09	Championship	3	0	—		1	0	—		4	0
Nottingham Forest	Total		15	1	0	0	2	0	1	0	18	1
Brentford (loan)	2007–08	League Two	4	0	0	0	—		—		4	0
Mansfield Town (loan)	2008–09	Conference Premier	10	4	3	0	—		2 (Note: One appearance and one goal in Conference League Cup, one appearance in FA Trophy)	1	15	5
Macclesfield Town (loan)	2008–09	League Two	17	1	—		—		—		17	1
Macclesfield Town	2009–10	League Two	42	7	1	0	0	0	1	0	44	7
Macclesfield Town	2010–11	League Two	31	5	2	1	1	0	1	0	35	6
Macclesfield Town	2011–12	League Two	5	1	—		2	3	—		7	4
Macclesfield Town	Total		95	14	3	1	3	3	2	0	103	18
Peterborough United	2011–12	Championship	35	10	1	0	—		—		36	10
Peterborough United	2012–13	Championship	12	3	0	0	1	0	—		13	3
Peterborough United	2013–14	League One	0	0	—		0	0	—		0	0
Peterborough United	Total		47	13	1	0	1	0	—		49	13
Barnsley (loan)	2012–13	Championship	4	0	—		—		—		4	0
Doncaster Rovers (loan)	2012–13	League One	4	0	—		—		—		4	0
Crawley Town	2013–14	League One	15	2	3	1	—		1	1	19	4
Northampton Town (loan)	2013–14	League Two	20	2	—		—		—		20	2
Northampton Town	2014–15	League Two	10	1	2	0	1	0	1	0	14	1
Northampton Town	Total		30	3	2	0	1	0	1	0	34	3
York City	2014–15	League Two	12	2	—		—		—		12	2
York City	2015–16	League Two	12	0	1	0	0	0	1	0	14	0
York City	Total		24	2	1	0	0	0	1	0	26	2
Guiseley (loan)	2015–16	National League	11	2	—		—		2 (Note: Appearance(s) in FA Trophy)	0	13	2
Altrincham	2016–17	National League North	4	1	—		—		—		4	1
Bradford Park Avenue	2016–17	National League North	28	3	1	0	—		1	0	30	3
Ossett Town	2017–18	Northern Premier League Division One North	4	1	—		—		1	0	5	1
Career total			295	46	14	2	7	3	12	2	328	53
