= Paul Taylor (footballer, born 1987) =

English footballer

Personal information
- Full name: Paul Thomas Taylor
- Date of birth: 4 October 1987 (age 39)
- Place of birth: Liverpool, England
- Height: 1.70 m (5 ft 7 in)
- Position: Striker

Team information
- Current team: Congleton Town

Youth career
- Everton
- Liverpool
- 2005–2006: Manchester City

Senior career*
Years	Team	Apps	(Gls)
2007–2008	Vauxhall Motors	32	(17)
2008	→ Chester City (loan)	9	(0)
2009	Montegnée	18	(13)
2009–2011	Anderlecht	0	(0)
2010	→ Charleroi (loan)	2	(0)
2011–2012	Peterborough United	48	(12)
2012–2015	Ipswich Town	21	(1)
2013	→ Peterborough United (loan)	6	(0)
2014	→ Rotherham United (loan)	17	(0)
2015	→ Blackburn Rovers (loan)	5	(0)
2016–2017	Peterborough United	39	(3)
2017–2018	Bradford City	27	(6)
2018–2019	Doncaster Rovers	14	(1)
2019–2020	Stevenage	10	(0)
2022	Sandbach United	4	(0)
2022–	Congleton Town	0	(0)
- * Club domestic league appearances and goals as of 08:43, 27 February 2022 (UTC)

Paul Thomas Taylor (born 4 October 1987) is an English footballer who plays as a striker for Congleton Town.

He has previously played for Vauxhall Motors, Chester City, Montegnée, Anderlecht, Charleroi, Ipswich Town, Peterborough United, Rotherham United, Blackburn Rovers, Bradford City, Doncaster Rovers and Stevenage.

== Career ==
=== Apprenticeship and Vauxhall Motors ===
Born in Liverpool, Taylor is a former youth player of both Liverpool & Everton who then moved onto Manchester City from 2005 to 2006. Taylor joined non–league side Vauxhall Motors in 2007 and scored 17 goals in the Conference North in 2007–08.

During the season, Chester City had a bid for the player rejected and Taylor spent time on trial with Nottingham Forest. After several weeks of talks in the summer of 2008, Taylor joined Chester on 1 July on a six-month loan deal with a view to a permanent signing. On 27 October 2008, he was released from his loan contract with Chester City, he moved back to Vauxhall Motors.

=== Chester City and controversy ===
Taylor made his Chester debut as a substitute in a 6–0 defeat at Dagenham & Redbridge on 9 August 2008, which was also his first Football League appearance. He went on to play nine league games (seven as substitute) and one cup match before the club announced his loan was being terminated on 24 October 2008. This followed a "third breach of club discipline". Due to Chester city not paying Paul Taylor full wages he was unable to travel to 3 away matches. Despite Chester not wanting his services, Vauxhall Motors insisted City were legally bound to pay for his transfer in January 2009.

On 31 October 2008, it was reported that Taylor had tested positive in a random drugs test when at Chester, after traces of cocaine were found in his sample. As a result, he faced a six-month playing ban, before joining Belgian fifth division Montegnée.

=== Belgium ===
On 16 December 2009, he signed for Anderlecht, but on 26 January 2010 was loaned to Charleroi.

=== Peterborough United ===
Taylor signed for Peterborough United on an 18-month deal on 28 February 2011. He scored his first goal in the 2–2 draw at Millwall on 17 August 2011. He went on to make his first start on 20 August against Ipswich Town and scored two goals in a 7–1 victory. On 26 November, he scored a volley in the 1–1 draw against Middlesbrough. On 17 December 2011, Peterborough faced Coventry City at home, and with 20 minutes remaining Taylor picked up the ball and played it into the path of Emile Sinclair who finished off the move nicely, the game finished 1–0 to the Posh. He then continued his fine form in 2012, helping Peterborough avoid relegation to secure another year in the Championship. In April 2012, Taylor rejected a four-year deal at London Road Stadium, a chance to become the highest paid player at the club, as a result he was put on the Summer transfer list as part of the club's new policy.

On 28 August 2012, Taylor, along with teammate George Boyd, were the subject of an undisclosed bid from fellow Championship side, Ipswich Town, which was accepted by the club. The following day, both players travelled to discuss personal terms and both also passed medicals. However, later that night the deals fell through as neither player could agree personal terms.

=== Ipswich Town ===
On 30 August 2012, Ipswich returned with a second undisclosed bid of an initial £1.5 million, this time for Taylor only, which was also accepted by Peterborough. Taylor agreed personal terms the same day. On 14 June 2013, Taylor pleaded guilty to a charge of assault occasioning actual bodily harm. In April 2014, Ipswich manager Mick McCarthy confirmed that Taylor had been placed on the transfer list along with out of favour Goalkeeper Scott Loach.

On 26 September 2013, Taylor rejoined former club Peterborough United on a short-term loan deal running until 2 November 2013, as a replacement for the injured Lee Tomlin and to help gain first team football after a season long injury in his debut season at Ipswich Town.

In August 2014, it was announced Taylor had joined Rotherham United on loan until January 2015.

=== Return to Peterborough United ===
In July 2016 it was announced that Taylor had rejoined Peterborough United on a 1-year deal. He scored his first goal in his third spell for Peterborough in a 3–2 EFL Cup win against AFC Wimbledon on 9 August 2016.

=== Bradford City ===
On 23 June 2017, Bradford City confirmed the signing of Taylor from Peterborough United. He arrived on a free transfer, with his contract at Peterborough having left them in the summer. He left the club for personal reasons in April 2018.

=== Doncaster Rovers ===
On 2 August 2018, Taylor joined Doncaster Rovers on a free transfer, signing a one-year deal. On 31 January 2019, Taylor had his contract terminated by mutual consent following 19 appearances, scoring one goal.

=== Sandbach United ===
In January 2022, Taylor has joined North West Counties League Division 1 South Team Sandbach United.

== Career statistics ==
As of match played 18 January 2020

Appearances and goals by club, season and competition
Club	Season	League			FA Cup		League Cup		Other		Total	
Club	Season	Division	Apps	Goals	Apps	Goals	Apps	Goals	Apps	Goals	Apps	Goals
Peterborough United	2010–11	League One	1	0	0	0	0	0	0	0	1	0
Peterborough United	2011–12	Championship	44	12	1	0	2	0	—		47	12
Peterborough United	2012–13	Championship	3	0	0	0	2	2	—		5	2
Peterborough United	Total		48	12	1	0	4	2	0	0	53	12
Ipswich Town	2012–13	Championship	3	0	0	0	0	0	—		3	0
Ipswich Town	2013–14	Championship	18	1	2	0	1	0	—		21	1
Ipswich Town	2014–15	Championship	0	0	0	0	1	0	0	0	1	0
Ipswich Town	Total		21	1	2	0	2	0	0	0	25	1
Peterborough United (loan)	2013–14	League One	6	0	0	0	0	0	1 (Note: Appearance in Football League Trophy)	0	7	0
Rotherham United (loan)	2014–15	Championship	17	0	0	0	0	0	—		17	0
Blackburn Rovers (loan)	2014–15	Championship	5	0	0	0	0	0	—		5	0
Peterborough United	2016–17	League One	39	3	4	1	2	1	2 (Note: Appearance(s) in EFL Trophy)	1	47	6
Bradford City	2017–18	League One	27	6	3	0	1	0	2	0	33	6
Doncaster Rovers	2018–19	League One	14	1	2	0	2	0	1	0	19	1
Stevenage	2019–20	League Two	10	0	0	0	1	0	1	0	12	0
Guilsfield F.C.	2021–22	Cymru North	0	0	0	0	0	0	0	0	0	0
Sandbach United	2022-	NWCL Div1	0	0	0	0	0	0	0	0	0	0
Career total			187	23	12	1	12	3	7	1	218	28
