= 2011–12 Macclesfield Town F.C. season =

Macclesfield Town F.C.
2011–12 season
- Chairman: Mike Rance
- Manager: Gary Simpson (sacked 18 March 2012); Brian Horton (until 30 April 2012); Glyn Chamberlain (caretaker)
- League Two: 24th relegated
- FA Cup: 3rd round
- League Cup: 2nd round
- Football League Trophy: 2nd round (North)
- Top goalscorer: League: George Donnelly & Ben Tomlinson (6); All: George Donnelly (7)
- Highest home attendance: League: 3,434 vs Crewe Alexandra (14 April 2012); All: 5,757 vs Bolton Wanderers (7 January 2012)
- Lowest home attendance: League: 1,527 vs Morecambe (13 September 2011); All: 1,527 vs Morecambe (13 September 2011)
- Average home league attendance: 2,227
| Home colours | Away colours |

This page shows the progress of Macclesfield Town F.C. in the 2011–12 English football season. This year they play their games in League Two in the English league system, the fourth tier.

== League data ==
=== League table ===
| Pos | Team | Pld | W | D | L | GF | GA | GD | Pts | Promotion, qualification or relegation |
|---|---|---|---|---|---|---|---|---|---|---|
| 20 | Northampton Town | 46 | 12 | 12 | 22 | 56 | 79 | −23 | 48 | |
| 21 | Plymouth Argyle | 46 | 10 | 16 | 20 | 47 | 64 | −17 | 46 | |
| 22 | Barnet | 46 | 12 | 10 | 24 | 52 | 79 | −27 | 46 | |
| 23 | Hereford United (R) | 46 | 10 | 14 | 22 | 50 | 70 | −20 | 44 | Relegation to the Conference Premier |
| 24 | Macclesfield Town (R) | 46 | 8 | 13 | 25 | 39 | 64 | −25 | 37 | Relegation to the Conference Premier |

Updated to match(es) played on 5 May 2012. Source: BBC Sport
Rules for classification: 1) Points; 2) Goal difference; 3) Number of goals scored
(R) Relegated

=== Results summary ===
| Overall | | | | | | | | Home | | | | | | Away | | | | | |
| Pld | W | D | L | GF | GA | GD | Pts | W | D | L | GF | GA | GD | W | D | L | GF | GA | GD |
|---|---|---|---|---|---|---|---|---|---|---|---|---|---|---|---|---|---|---|---|
| 46 | 8 | 13 | 25 | 39 | 64 | −25 | 37 | 5 | 11 | 7 | 25 | 26 | −1 | 3 | 2 | 18 | 14 | 38 | −24 |

Source: Macclesfield Town F.C.

=== Managerial change ===
| Outgoing manager | Manner of departure | Date of vacancy | Position in table | Incoming manager | Date of appointment |
|---|---|---|---|---|---|
| (England) Gary Simpson | Sacked | 18 March 2012 | 21st | Brian Horton | 19 March 2012 |

Following Macclesfield's victory over Port Vale on 31 December 2011, the club then went 16 consecutive games without a victory and found themselves out of the relegation places in League Two only by way of goal difference. This prompted chairman Mike Rance to sack Gary Simpson on 18 March 2012. Brian Horton was installed as manager until the end of the season, in what is his second spell at the club, a day later.

== Squad statistics ==
=== Appearances and goals ===
| No. | Pos | Nat | Player | Total | | League Two | | FA Cup | | League Cup | | FL Trophy | |
| No. | Pos | Nat | Player | Apps | Goals | Apps | Goals | Apps | Goals | Apps | Goals | Apps | Goals |
|---|---|---|---|---|---|---|---|---|---|---|---|---|---|
| 1 | GK | (Cape Verde) CPV | José Veiga | 42 | 0 | 35+0 | 0 | 5+0 | 0 | 2+0 | 0 | 0+0 | 0 |
| 2 | DF | (England) ENG | Jonathan Bateson | 28 | 0 | 17+4 | 0 | 5+0 | 0 | 1+0 | 0 | 1+0 | 0 |
| 3 | DF | (England) ENG | Carl Tremarco | 42 | 2 | 35+0 | 0 | 4+0 | 2 | 2+0 | 0 | 1+0 | 0 |
| 4 | MF | (England) ENG | Scott Kay | 18 | 0 | 10+5 | 0 | 0+0 | 0 | 1+1 | 0 | 1+0 | 0 |
| 5 | DF | (England) ENG | Nat Brown | 45 | 0 | 37+0 | 0 | 5+0 | 0 | 2+0 | 0 | 1+0 | 0 |
| 6 | DF | (Northern Ireland) NIR | Paul Morgan | 3 | 0 | 2+1 | 0 | 0+0 | 0 | 0+0 | 0 | 0+0 | 0 |
| 7 | MF | (England) ENG | Lewis Chalmers | 27 | 3 | 17+6 | 3 | 1+0 | 0 | 2+0 | 0 | 1+0 | 0 |
| 8 | MF | (England) ENG | Ross Draper | 32 | 4 | 27+1 | 4 | 1+0 | 0 | 2+0 | 0 | 1+0 | 0 |
| 9 | FW | (England) ENG | George Donnelly | 32 | 7 | 28+0 | 6 | 4+0 | 1 | 0+0 | 0 | 0+0 | 0 |
| 10 | FW | (Democratic Republic of the Congo) COD | Vinny Mukendi | 20 | 1 | 4+12 | 1 | 1+2 | 0 | 0+1 | 0 | 0+0 | 0 |
| 11 | MF | (England) ENG | Colin Daniel | 41 | 3 | 30+6 | 2 | 5+0 | 1 | 0+0 | 0 | 0+0 | 0 |
| 12 | MF | (Guinea-Bissau) GBS | Arnaud Mendy | 33 | 3 | 23+5 | 2 | 4+0 | 1 | 0+1 | 0 | 0+0 | 0 |
| 14 | DF | (France) FRA | Tony Diagne | 48 | 4 | 40+1 | 3 | 4+0 | 1 | 2+0 | 0 | 1+0 | 0 |
| 16 | DF | (England) ENG | Shaun Brisley | 37 | 3 | 29+0 | 3 | 5+0 | 0 | 2+0 | 0 | 1+0 | 0 |
| 17 | MF | (England) ENG | Sam Wedgbury | 47 | 1 | 37+2 | 1 | 5+0 | 0 | 2+0 | 0 | 1+0 | 0 |
| 18 | FW | (England) ENG | Waide Fairhurst | 20 | 0 | 4+14 | 0 | 0+2 | 0 | 0+0 | 0 | 0+0 | 0 |
| 19 | FW | (England) ENG | Tom Fisher | 1 | 0 | 0+1 | 0 | 0+0 | 0 | 0+0 | 0 | 0+0 | 0 |
| 20 | MF | (England) ENG | Matt Hamshaw | 46 | 3 | 30+8 | 2 | 4+1 | 1 | 0+2 | 0 | 0+1 | 0 |
| 22 | GK | (England) ENG | Steve Collis | 1 | 0 | 0+0 | 0 | 0+0 | 0 | 0+0 | 0 | 1+0 | 0 |
| 23 | FW | (England) ENG | Ben Tomlinson | 27 | 6 | 15+10 | 6 | 0+0 | 0 | 1+0 | 0 | 1+0 | 0 |
| 24 | DF | (Wales) WAL | Elliott Hewitt | 24 | 0 | 17+4 | 0 | 1+1 | 0 | 1+0 | 0 | 0+0 | 0 |
| 25 | MF | (England) ENG | Michael Thomas | 6 | 0 | 2+4 | 0 | 0+0 | 0 | 0+0 | 0 | 0+0 | 0 |
| 26 | MF | (England) ENG | Adam Roberts | 4 | 0 | 1+1 | 0 | 0+1 | 0 | 0+0 | 0 | 0+1 | 0 |
| 29 | FW | (England) ENG | Ben Mills | 12 | 0 | 5+7 | 0 | 0+0 | 0 | 0+0 | 0 | 0+0 | 0 |
| 31 | MF | (Republic of Ireland) IRL | Dwayne Mattis | 3 | 1 | 3+0 | 1 | 0+0 | 0 | 0+0 | 0 | 0+0 | 0 |
| 33 | DF | (England) ENG | George Whiteoak | 1 | 0 | 0+0 | 0 | 0+1 | 0 | 0+0 | 0 | 0+0 | 0 |
| 34 | MF | (England) ENG | Michael Bakare | 9 | 0 | 0+9 | 0 | 0+0 | 0 | 0+0 | 0 | 0+0 | 0 |
Players who no longer play for Macclesfield but have made appearances this season:
| 9 | FW | (England) ENG | Emile Sinclair | 7 | 4 | 4+1 | 1 | 0+0 | 0 | 2+0 | 3 | 0+0 | 0 |
| 15 | FW | (England) ENG | John Grant | 5 | 0 | 0+4 | 0 | 0+0 | 0 | 0+0 | 0 | 0+1 | 0 |
Players on loan to Macclesfield who returned to their parent club:
| 15 | MF | (England) ENG | Marcus Marshall | 14 | 1 | 13+1 | 1 | 0+0 | 0 | 0+0 | 0 | 0+0 | 0 |
| 35 | DF | (England) ENG | Ben Futcher | 10 | 0 | 10+0 | 0 | 0+0 | 0 | 0+0 | 0 | 0+0 | 0 |
| 36 | DF | (Republic of Ireland) IRL | Mark Connolly | 7 | 0 | 7+0 | 0 | 0+0 | 0 | 0+0 | 0 | 0+0 | 0 |
| 38 | FW | (England) ENG | Matt Smith | 8 | 1 | 6+2 | 1 | 0+0 | 0 | 0+0 | 0 | 0+0 | 0 |
| 39 | FW | (England) ENG | Zac Aley | 1 | 0 | 1+0 | 0 | 0+0 | 0 | 0+0 | 0 | 0+0 | 0 |
| 40 | GK | (England) ENG | Richard O'Donnell | 11 | 0 | 11+0 | 0 | 0+0 | 0 | 0+0 | 0 | 0+0 | 0 |
| 29 | FW | (England) ENG | Scott Boden | 8 | 0 | 6+1 | 0 | 1+0 | 0 | 0+0 | 0 | 0+0 | 0 |
| 31 | DF | (England) ENG | Dan Gray | 2 | 0 | 2+0 | 0 | 0+0 | 0 | 0+0 | 0 | 0+0 | 0 |

=== Top scorers ===
| Place | Position | Nation | Number | Name | League Two | FA Cup | League Cup | FL Trophy | Total |
|---|---|---|---|---|---|---|---|---|---|
| 1 | FW | (England) | 9 | George Donnelly | 6 | 1 | 0 | 0 | 7 |
| 2 | FW | (England) | 23 | Ben Tomlinson | 6 | 0 | 0 | 0 | 6 |
| 3 | FW | (England) | 9 | Emile Sinclair | 1 | 0 | 3 | 0 | 4 |
| = | MF | (England) | 8 | Ross Draper | 4 | 0 | 0 | 0 | 4 |
| = | DF | (France) | 14 | Tony Diagne | 3 | 1 | 0 | 0 | 4 |
| 6 | DF | (England) | 16 | Shaun Brisley | 3 | 0 | 0 | 0 | 3 |
| = | MF | (England) | 7 | Lewis Chalmers | 3 | 0 | 0 | 0 | 3 |
| = | MF | (England) | 20 | Matt Hamshaw | 2 | 1 | 0 | 0 | 3 |
| = | MF | (Guinea-Bissau) | 12 | Arnaud Mendy | 2 | 1 | 0 | 0 | 3 |
| = | MF | (England) | 11 | Colin Daniel | 2 | 1 | 0 | 0 | 3 |
| 11 | DF | (England) | 3 | Carl Tremarco | 0 | 2 | 0 | 0 | 2 |
| 12 | MF | (Republic of Ireland) | 31 | Dwayne Mattis | 1 | 0 | 0 | 0 | 1 |
| = | MF | (England) | 15 | Marcus Marshall | 1 | 0 | 0 | 0 | 1 |
| = | MF | (England) | 17 | Sam Wedgbury | 1 | 0 | 0 | 0 | 1 |
| = | MF | (Democratic Republic of the Congo) | 10 | Vinny Mukendi | 1 | 0 | 0 | 0 | 1 |
| = | MF | (England) | 38 | Matt Smith | 1 | 0 | 0 | 0 | 1 |
| | | | | TOTALS | 37 | 7 | 3 | 0 | 47 |

=== Disciplinary record ===
| Number | Nation | Position | Name | League Two | | FA Cup | | League Cup | | FL Trophy | | Total | |
| Number | Nation | Position | Name | Yellow card | Red card | Yellow card | Red card | Yellow card | Red card | Yellow card | Red card | Yellow card | Red card |
| 8 | (England) | MF | Ross Draper | 9 | 1 | 0 | 0 | 0 | 0 | 0 | 0 | 9 | 1 |
| 3 | (England) | DF | Carl Tremarco | 6 | 1 | 2 | 0 | 0 | 0 | 0 | 0 | 8 | 1 |
| 9 | (England) | FW | George Donnelly | 5 | 0 | 1 | 0 | 0 | 0 | 0 | 0 | 6 | 0 |
| 5 | (England) | DF | Nat Brown | 3 | 1 | 1 | 0 | 0 | 0 | 1 | 0 | 5 | 1 |
| 14 | (France) | MF | Tony Diagne | 5 | 0 | 0 | 0 | 0 | 0 | 0 | 0 | 5 | 0 |
| 12 | (Guinea-Bissau) | MF | Arnaud Mendy | 4 | 0 | 1 | 0 | 0 | 0 | 0 | 0 | 5 | 0 |
| 23 | (England) | FW | Ben Tomlinson | 5 | 0 | 0 | 0 | 0 | 0 | 0 | 0 | 5 | 0 |
| 4 | (England) | MF | Scott Kay | 3 | 0 | 0 | 0 | 1 | 0 | 0 | 0 | 4 | 0 |
| 17 | (England) | MF | Sam Wedgbury | 2 | 0 | 1 | 0 | 0 | 0 | 0 | 0 | 3 | 0 |
| 2 | (England) | DF | Jonathan Bateson | 2 | 0 | 1 | 0 | 0 | 0 | 0 | 0 | 3 | 0 |
| 11 | (England) | MF | Colin Daniel | 2 | 0 | 0 | 0 | 0 | 0 | 0 | 0 | 2 | 0 |
| 16 | (England) | DF | Shaun Brisley | 1 | 0 | 1 | 0 | 0 | 0 | 0 | 0 | 2 | 0 |
| 24 | (Wales) | DF | Elliott Hewitt | 1 | 0 | 1 | 0 | 0 | 0 | 0 | 0 | 2 | 0 |
| 14 | (England) | MF | Michael Thomas | 2 | 0 | 0 | 0 | 0 | 0 | 0 | 0 | 2 | 0 |
| 7 | (England) | MF | Lewis Chalmers | 2 | 0 | 0 | 0 | 0 | 0 | 0 | 0 | 2 | 0 |
| 1 | (Cape Verde) | GK | José Veiga | 2 | 0 | 0 | 0 | 0 | 0 | 0 | 0 | 2 | 0 |
| 15 | (England) | MF | Marcus Marshall | 2 | 0 | 0 | 0 | 0 | 0 | 0 | 0 | 2 | 0 |
| 20 | (England) | MF | Matt Hamshaw | 2 | 0 | 0 | 0 | 0 | 0 | 0 | 0 | 2 | 0 |
| 29 | (England) | FW | Ben Mills | 1 | 0 | 0 | 0 | 0 | 0 | 0 | 0 | 1 | 0 |
| 40 | (England) | GK | Richard O'Donnell | 1 | 0 | 0 | 0 | 0 | 0 | 0 | 0 | 1 | 0 |
| 35 | (England) | DF | Ben Futcher | 1 | 0 | 0 | 0 | 0 | 0 | 0 | 0 | 1 | 0 |
| 26 | (England) | MF | Adam Roberts | 1 | 0 | 0 | 0 | 0 | 0 | 0 | 0 | 1 | 0 |
| 10 | (Democratic Republic of the Congo) | FW | Vinny Mukendi | 0 | 1 | 0 | 0 | 0 | 0 | 0 | 0 | 0 | 1 |
| | | | TOTALS | 64 | 4 | 8 | 0 | 1 | 0 | 1 | 0 | 74 | 4 |

== Results ==
=== Pre-season friendlies ===
| 8 July 2011 | Parkgate | 2–5 | Macclesfield Town |
| 19:30 | Forbes-Swindels; Laight | | Tomlinson; Draper; Kymantas; Wedgbury | Attendance: 120 |

| 9 July 2011 | Buxton | 1–3 | Macclesfield Town | The Silverlands |
| 15:00 | Johnson | | Brisley; Tremarco; Diagne |

| 16 July 2011 | Nantwich Town | 1–0 | Macclesfield Town | The Weaver Stadium |
| 15:00 |

| 19 July 2011 | Macclesfield Town | 2–2 | Derby County | Moss Rose |
| 19:30 | Brisley 12'; Sinclair 46' | | Ball 13', 62' |

| 23 July 2011 | Macclesfield Town | 1–1 | Chesterfield | Moss Rose |
| 15:00 | Sinclair 8' | | Bowery 39' |

| 26 July 2011 | Leek Town | 0–1 | Macclesfield Town | Harrison Park |
| 19:30 | | | Chalmers 90' (pen.) |

| 30 July 2011 | Macclesfield Town | 1–0 | Notts County | Moss Rose |
| 15:00 | Fairhurst 57' | | | Attendance: 572 |

=== League Two ===
| 6 August 2011 1 | Macclesfield Town | 0–1 | Dagenham & Redbridge | Moss Rose |
| 15:00 | | | Elito 60' | Attendance: 1,566 |

| 13 August 2011 2 | Crawley Town | 2–0 | Macclesfield Town | Broadfield Stadium |
| 15:00 | Barnett 57'; Thomas 75' | | | Attendance: 2,389 |

| 16 August 2011 3 | Hereford United | 0–4 | Macclesfield Town | Edgar Street |
| 19:45 | | | Diagne 53'; Draper 81'; Tomlinson 90', 90+2' | Attendance: 1,609 |

| 20 August 2011 4 | Macclesfield Town | 0–0 | Bristol Rovers | Moss Rose |
| 15:00 | | | | Attendance: 1,865 |

| 27 August 2011 5 | Macclesfield Town | 4–0 | AFC Wimbledon | Moss Rose |
| 15:00 | Brisley 3'; Diagne 24'; Sinclair 48'; Mendy 87' | | | Attendance: 1,881 |

| 3 September 2011 6 | Torquay United | 3–0 | Macclesfield Town | Plainmoor |
| 15:00 | Saah 63'; McPhee 75'; O'Kane 90' | | | Attendance: 2,307 |

| 10 September 2011 7 | Cheltenham Town | 2–0 | Macclesfield Town | Abbey Business Stadium |
| 15:00 | Goulding 34' (pen.); Spencer 88' | | | Attendance: 2,268 |

| 13 September 2011 8 | Macclesfield Town | 1–1 | Morecambe | Moss Rose |
| 19:45 | Tomlinson 1' | | Carlton 16' | Attendance: 1,527 |

| 17 September 2011 9 | Macclesfield Town | 3–1 | Northampton Town | Moss Rose |
| 15:00 | Tomlinson 36', 84'; Daniel 88' | | Jackson 44' | Attendance: 2,033 |

| 24 September 2011 10 | Plymouth Argyle | 2–0 | Macclesfield Town | Home Park |
| 15:00 | Feeney 20'; Williams 53' | | | Attendance: 6,005 |

| 30 September 2011 11 | Macclesfield Town | 2–0 | Swindon Town | Moss Rose |
| 19:45 | Donnelly 62'; Draper 83' | | | Attendance: 2,317 |

| 8 October 2011 12 | Aldershot Town | 1–2 | Macclesfield Town | Recreation Ground |
| 15:00 | Hylton 41' | | Donnelly 53'; Draper 73' | Attendance: 2,341 |

| 15 October 2011 13 | Macclesfield Town | 1–1 | Oxford United | Moss Rose |
| 15:00 | Diagne 60' | | Hall 90+4' | Attendance: 2,293 |

| 22 October 2011 14 | Crewe Alexandra | 0–1 | Macclesfield Town | Alexandra Stadium |
| 15:00 | | | Draper 19' | Attendance: 3,877 |

| 25 October 2011 15 | Macclesfield Town | 1–0 | Bradford City | Moss Rose |
| 19:45 | Chalmers 66' (pen.) | | | Attendance: 2,373 |

| 29 October 2011 16 | Macclesfield Town | 0–2 | Southend United | Moss Rose |
| 15:00 | | | Hall 39'; Ferdinand 62' | Attendance: 2,174 |

| 5 November 2011 17 | Burton Albion | 1–0 | Macclesfield Town | Pirelli Stadium |
| 15:00 | Kee 11' | | | Attendance: 2,698 |

| 19 November 2011 18 | Macclesfield Town | 1–1 | Accrington Stanley | Moss Rose |
| 15:00 | Brisley 19' | | Stockley 79' | Attendance: 1,792 |

| 25 November 2011 19 | Barnet | 2–1 | Macclesfield Town | Underhill Stadium |
| 19:45 | McLeod 41' (pen.), 45' (pen.) | | Hamshaw 61' | Attendance: 2,200 |

| 10 December 2011 20 | Macclesfield Town | 0–0 | Gillingham | Moss Rose |
| 15:00 | | | | Attendance: 1,724 |

| 17 December 2011 21 | Shrewsbury Town | 1–0 | Macclesfield Town | New Meadow |
| 15:00 | Cansdell-Sherriff 49' | | | Attendance: 4,871 |

| 26 December 2011 22 | Macclesfield Town | 0–0 | Rotherham United | Moss Rose |
| 15:00 | | | | Attendance: 3,132 |

| 31 December 2011 23 | Macclesfield Town | 2–1 | Port Vale | Moss Rose |
| 13:00 | Tomlinson 37' (o.g.); Donnelly 71' | | Richards 61' | Attendance: 4,214 |

| 2 January 2012 24 | Accrington Stanley | 4–0 | Macclesfield Town | Crown Ground |
| 15:00 | Lindfield 13'; Long 45+1'; Evans 62'; Procter 76' | | | Attendance: 1,704 |

| 14 January 2012 25 | Macclesfield Town | 1–2 | Torquay United | Moss Rose |
| 15:00 | Brisley 81' | | Morris 52'; Ellis 74' | Attendance: 1,878 |

| 21 January 2012 26 | Swindon Town | 1–0 | Macclesfield Town | County Ground |
| 15:00 | Benson 76' | | | Attendance: 7,639 |

| 24 January 2012 27 | AFC Wimbledon | 2–1 | Macclesfield Town | Kingsmeadow |
| 19:45 | Knott 60'; Moore 88' | | Mattis 58' | Attendance: 4,000 |

| 28 January 2012 28 | Macclesfield Town | 1–3 | Cheltenham Town | Moss Rose |
| 15:00 | Marshall 30' | | Sido Jombarti 37'; Goulding 67'; Garbutt 90+4' | Attendance: 1,659 |

| 14 February 2012 29 | Morecambe | 1–0 | Macclesfield Town | Globe Arena |
| 19:45 | Carlton 56' | | | Attendance: 1,316 |

| 18 February 2012 30 | Macclesfield Town | 0–1 | Aldershot Town | Moss Rose |
| 15:00 | | | Morris 65' | Attendance: 1,715 |

| 21 February 2012 31 | Northampton Town | 3–2 | Macclesfield Town | Sixfields Stadium |
| 19:45 | Jacobs 26'; Guttridge 45+1'; Akinfenwa 52' | | Donnelly 17'; Tomlinson 85' | Attendance: 4,529 |

| 25 February 2012 32 | Oxford United | 1–1 | Macclesfield Town | Kassam Stadium |
| 15:00 | Johnson 42' | | Duberry 9' (o.g.) | Attendance: 6,189 |

| 28 February 2012 33 | Macclesfield Town | 1–1 | Plymouth Argyle | Moss Rose |
| 19:45 | Donnelly 90+5' | | Hourihane 71' | Attendance: 1,888 |

| 3 March 2012 34 | Bristol Rovers | 0–0 | Macclesfield Town | Memorial Stadium |
| 15:00 | | | | Attendance: 5,420 |

| 6 March 2012 35 | Macclesfield Town | 2–2 | Hereford United | Moss Rose |
| 19:45 | Wedgbury 48'; Hamshaw 79' | | Evans 1' 26' | Attendance: 1,676 |

| 10 March 2012 36 | Macclesfield Town | 2–2 | Crawley Town | Moss Rose |
| 15:00 | Mukendi 85'; Donnelly 90+2' | | Davis 37'; McFadzean 47' | Attendance: 1,802 |

| 17 March 2012 37 | Dagenham & Redbridge | 2–0 | Macclesfield Town | Victoria Stadium |
| 15:00 | Elito 16' 90+6' | | | Attendance: 1,446 |

| 20 March 2012 38 | Rotherham United | 4–2 | Macclesfield Town | Don Valley Stadium |
| 19:45 | Bradley 37'; Pringle 57'; Revell 68'; Cadogan 77' | | Smith 65'; Chalmers 73' (pen.) | Attendance: 2,505 |

| 23 March 2012 39 | Macclesfield Town | 0–0 | Barnet | Moss Rose |
| 19:45 | | | | Attendance: 2,123 |

| 31 March 2012 40 | Gillingham | 2–0 | Macclesfield Town | Priestfield Stadium |
| 15:00 | Fish 51'; Whelpdale 85' | | | Attendance: 4,562 |

| 6 April 2012 41 | Macclesfield Town | 1–3 | Shrewsbury Town | Moss Rose |
| 19:45 | Arnaud Mendy 85' | | Collins 33' 86'; Wright 83' | Attendance: 3,403 |

| 9 April 2012 42 | Port Vale | 1–0 | Macclesfield Town | Vale Park |
| 15:00 | Yates 82' | | | Attendance: 4,246 |

| 14 April 2012 43 | Macclesfield Town | 2–2 | Crewe Alexandra | Moss Rose |
| 15:00 | Chalmers 17' (pen.); Daniel 80' | | Powell 40' 58' | Attendance: 3,434 |

| 21 April 2012 44 | Bradford City | 1–0 | Macclesfield Town | Valley Parade |
| 15:00 | Hanson 65' | | | Attendance: 10,106 |

| 28 April 2012 45 | Macclesfield Town | 0–2 | Burton Albion | Moss Rose |
| 15:00 | | | Maghoma 81'; Zola 90+2' | Attendance: 2,760 |

| 5 May 2012 46 | Southend United | 2–0 | Macclesfield Town | Roots Hall |
| 15:00 | Gilbert 24'; Timlin (yellow card) 38'; Harris 90+1' | | Roberts (yellow card) 50'; Tomlinson (yellow card) 63' | Attendance: 9,122 |

=== FA Cup ===
| 12 November 2011 Round 1 | East Thurrock | 0–3 | Macclesfield Town | Rookery Hill |
| 14:00 | | | Tremarco 43'; Hamshaw 61'; Donnelly 65' | Attendance: 1,207 |

| 3 December 2011 Round 2 | Chelmsford City | 1–1 | Macclesfield Town | Melbourne Stadium |
| 15:00 | Cornhill 35' | | Diagne 64' |

| 14 December 2011 Round 2 replay | Macclesfield Town | 1–0 | Chelmsford City | Moss Rose |
| 20:05 | Tremarco 26' |

| 7 January 2012 Round 3 | Macclesfield Town | 2–2 | Bolton Wanderers | Moss Rose |
| 15:00 | Daniel 16'; Mendy 68' | | Klasnić 7'; Wheater 77' | Attendance: 5,757 |

| 17 January 2012 Round 3 replay | Bolton Wanderers | 2–0 | Macclesfield Town | Reebok Stadium |
| 19:45 | Davies 1'; Petrov 26'; Davies (yellow card) 47'; Boyata (yellow card) 78' | | Hewitt (yellow card) 90+1' | Attendance: 9,466 |

=== League Cup ===
| 9 August 2011 Round 1 | Hull City | 0–2 | Macclesfield Town | KC Stadium |
| 19:45 | | | Sinclair 17', 59' | Attendance: 4,826 |

| 24 August 2011 Round 2 | Bolton Wanderers | 2–1 | Macclesfield Town | Reebok Stadium |
| 20:00 | Tuncay 56'; Petrov 73' | | Sinclair 11' | Attendance: 6,777; Referee: Eddie Ilderton |

=== Football League Trophy ===
| 5 October 2011 Round 2 | Crewe Alexandra | 1–0 | Macclesfield Town | Crewe |
| 19:30 | Clayton 76' | | | Stadium: Alexandra Stadium; Attendance: 2,271; Referee: Jack Waugh |

== Transfers ==
Players transferred in
| Date | Pos. | Name | Previous club | Fee | Ref. |
|---|---|---|---|---|---|
| 24 June 2011 | DF | (England) Jonathan Bateson | (England) Accrington Stanley | Free | |
| 25 June 2011 | MF | (England) Scott Kay | (England) Manchester City | Free | |
| 29 June 2011 | FW | (England) Ben Tomlinson | (England) Worksop Town | Undisclosed | |
| 11 July 2011 | MF | (Guinea-Bissau) Arnaud Mendy | (England) Derby County | Free (unattached) | |
| 12 July 2011 | FW | (England) Tom Fisher | (England) Stockport County | Free | |
| 19 July 2011 | FW | (England) Waide Fairhurst | (England) Doncaster Rovers | Undisclosed | |
| 5 August 2011 | FW | (England) John Grant | (England) Barrow | Free | |
| 22 September 2011 | GK | (England) Steve Collis | (England) Peterborough United | Free | |
| 1 January 2012 | FW | (England) George Donnelly | (England) Fleetwood Town | Undisclosed | |
| 10 January 2012 | FW | (England) Ben Mills | (England) Nantwich Town | Undisclosed | |
| 19 January 2012 | FW | (England) Michael Bakare | (England) Chelmsford | Free | |
| 21 January 2012 | MF | (Republic of Ireland) Dwayne Mattis | (England) Chesterfield | Free | |
Players transferred out
| Date | Pos. | Name | Subsequent club | Fee | Ref. |
| 18 June 2011 | MF | (England) Izak Reid | (England) Morecambe | (Tribunal decision) | |
| 29 June 2011 | FW | (England) Tyrone Barnett | (England) Crawley Town | £150,000 | |
| 31 August 2011 | FW | (England) Emile Sinclair | (England) Peterborough United | Undisclosed | |
Players loaned in
| Date from | Pos. | Name | From | Date to | Ref. |
| 9 September 2011 | FW | (England) George Donnelly | (England) Fleetwood Town | 9 October 2011 | |
| 9 September 2011 | FW | (England) Scott Boden | (England) Chesterfield | 9 December 2011 | |
| 31 October 2011 | FW | (England) George Donnelly | (England) Fleetwood Town | 1 January 2012 | |
| 9 November 2011 | DF | (England) Dan Gray | (England) Chesterfield | 9 December 2011 | |
| 27 January 2012 | MF | (England) Marcus Marshall | (England) Rotherham United | 30 April 2012 | |
| 20 February 2012 | DF | (England) Ben Futcher | (England) Bury | End of season | |
| 24 February 2012 | DF | (Republic of Ireland) Mark Connolly | (England) Bolton Wanderers | 24 March 2012 | |
| 24 February 2012 | GK | (England) Richard O'Donnell | (England) Sheffield Wednesday | 26 April 2012 | |
| 15 March 2012 | FW | (England) Matt Smith | (England) Oldham Athletic | End of season | |
| 15 March 2012 | MF | (Northern Ireland) Matt Ball | (England) Norwich City | 15 April 2012 | |
| 22 March 2012 | FW | (England) Zac Aley | (England) Blackburn Rovers | End of season | |
Players loaned out
| Date from | Pos. | Name | To | Date to | Ref. |
| 26 August 2011 | DF | (England) Jack Lane | (England) Newcastle Town | | |
| 24 September 2011 | FW | (Democratic Republic of the Congo) Vinny Mukendi | (England) Southport | 26 October 2011 | |
| 4 November 2011 | FW | (England) Tom Fisher | (England) Hyde | 9 December 2011 | |
| 17 December 2011 | DF | (England) Jack Lane | (England) Woodley Sports | | |
| 19 January 2012 | FW | (Democratic Republic of the Congo) Vinny Mukendi | (England) Southport | 19 March 2012 | |
| 20 January 2012 | FW | (England) Tom Fisher | (England) Droylsden | 20 February 2012 | |
| 9 February 2012 | DF | (England) Shaun Brisley | (England) Peterborough United | End of season | |
| 22 March 2012 | GK | (England) Jack Cudworth | (England) Barrow | End of season | |
Players released
| Date | Pos. | Name | Subsequent club | Join date | Ref. |
| 1 June 2011 | MF | (England) Paul Bolland | (England) Mansfield Town | 1 July 2011 (Bosman) | |
| 3 June 2011 | MF | (England) Matthew Lowe | (England) Nantwich Town | 1 July 2011 | |
| 23 June 2011 | MF | (Algeria) Hamza Bencherif | (England) Notts County | 1 July 2011 (Bosman) | |
| 1 July 2011 | DF | (England) Jason Beardsley | (England) Mickleover Sports | 12 August 2011 | |
| 1 July 2011 | FW | (Jamaica) Ricky Sappleton | (England) Bishop's Stortford | ? | |
| 1 January 2012 | FW | (England) John Grant | Unattached | | |

== Awards ==
| End of Season Awards | Winner |
|---|---|
| Player of the Year | José Veiga |
| Players' Player of the Year | Carl Tremarco |
| Jean Ridgeway Award | Carl Tremarco |
| Andy Mellor Award | Sam Wedgbury |
| Young Player of the Year | James Bolton |
