= 2010–11 Macclesfield Town F.C. season =

Macclesfield Town F.C.
2010–11 season
- Chairman: Mike Rance
- Manager: Gary Simpson
- Football League Two: 15th
- FA Cup: Second round (eliminated by Huddersfield Town)
- League Cup: First round (eliminated by Leicester City)
- Football League Trophy: Northern Section; Second round (eliminated by Crewe Alexandra)
- Top goalscorer: League: Tyrone Barnett (13); All: Tyrone Barnett (13)
- Highest home attendance: 3,915 vs. Port Vale, 18 September 2010
- Lowest home attendance: 720 vs. Morecambe, 31 August 2010

This page shows the progress of Macclesfield Town F.C. in the 2010–11 football season. They competed in League Two, the fourth tier of English football, in which they finished 15th, and also competed in the FA Cup, League Cup and Football League Trophy where they were eliminated in the second round, first round and second round respectively.

== League Two ==
=== League table ===
Pos	Team	Pld	W	D	L	GF	GA	GD	Pts
13	Southend United	46	16	13	17	62	56	+6	61
14	Aldershot Town	46	14	19	13	54	54	0	61
15	Macclesfield Town	46	14	13	19	59	73	−14	55
16	Northampton Town	46	11	19	16	63	71	−8	52
17	Cheltenham Town	46	13	13	20	56	77	−21	52

Updated to match(es) played on 28 May 2011. Source: The Football League
Rules for classification: 1) points; 2) goal difference; 3) number of goals scored.

=== Results summary ===
Overall								Home						Away					
Pld	W	D	L	GF	GA	GD	Pts	W	D	L	GF	GA	GD	W	D	L	GF	GA	GD
46	14	13	19	59	73	−14	55	6	7	10	25	36	−11	8	6	9	34	37	−3

Last updated: 11 May 2011.
Source: Macclesfield Town F.C.

=== Results by round ===
Round	1	2	3	4	5	6	7	8	9	10	11	12	13	14	15	16	17	18	19	20	21	22	23	24	25	26	27	28	29	30	31	32	33	34	35	36	37	38	39	40	41	42	43	44	45	46
Ground	A	H	A	H	H	A	H	A	A	H	A	H	A	H	A	H	A	H	H	A	A	H	H	A	H	A	A	A	H	H	A	H	A	H	H	A	H	A	A	H	H	A	A	H	A	H
Result	D	L	L	D	L	W	L	W	D	W	L	W	L	W	D	W	W	L	L	L	D	L	D	L	L	D	D	W	W	L	L	W	W	D	D	W	L	L	L	L	D	L	W	D	W	D
Position			23	22	23	20	22	19	19	16	18	13	17	12	13	10	8	9	10	12	14	16	19	19	21	21	21	21	18	21	21	21	18	18	18	16	16	16	17	18	16	18	16	16	15	15

Updated to match(es) played on 19 June 2011. Source: Results
A = Away; H = Home; W = Win; D = Draw; L = Loss

==== Results ====
Win	Draw	Loss

Date	Opponent	Venue	Result (Note: Macclesfield Town's score shown first)	Scorers	Attendance
7 August 2010	Stevenage	A	2–2	Brown 12', Barnett 53'	3,553
14 August 2010	Shrewsbury Town	H	0–1		2,302
21 August 2010	Accrington Stanley	A	0–3		1,371
28 August 2010	Chesterfield	H	1–1	Sinclair 74'	2,176
4 September 2010	Stockport County	H	0–2		3,683
11 September 2010	Wycombe Wanderers	A	2–1	Daniel 11', Barnett 14'	3,789
18 September 2010	Port Vale	H	0–3		3,915
25 September 2010	Torquay United	A	3–1	Bencherif 12', Draper 76', Sinclair 78'	2,551
28 September 2010	Crewe Alexandra	A	1–1	Barnett 52'	3,659
2 October 2010	Northampton Town	H	2–0	Bencherif 25', Brown 71'	1,699
9 October 2010	Lincoln City	A	1–2	Bencherif 55'	3,047
16 October 2010	Oxford United	H	3–2	Bolland 51', 76', Hamshaw 67'	1,395
23 October 2010	Barnet	A	0–1		1,594
30 October 2010	Burton Albion	H	2–1	Bencherif 29', 48'	1,791
2 November 2010	Rotherham United	A	1–1	Barnett 84'	2,548
13 November 2010	Aldershot Town	H	2–0	Daniel 17', Barnett 77'	1,519
20 November 2010	Bradford City	A	1–0	Draper 23'	10,779
23 November 2010	Cheltenham Town	H	0–2		1,870
11 December 2010	Gillingham	H	2–4	Bencherif 7', Barnett 71'	1,507
28 December 2010	Oxford United	A	1–2	Sappleton 82'	9,440
1 January 2011	Bury	A	2–2	Butcher 29', Gray 69'	2,860
3 January 2011	Rotherham United	H	0–2		2,316
22 January 2011	Barnet	H	1–1	Daniel 70'	1,655
25 January 2011	Southend United	A	1–4	Daniel 79'	3,500
1 February 2011	Bury	H	2–4	Draper 37', Barnett 39'	1,267
8 February 2011	Hereford United	A	2–2	Diagne 18', Barnett 90'	1,975
12 February 2011	Aldershot Town	A	0–0		2,373
19 February 2011	Stockport County	A	4–1	Reid 33', Barnett 48', Turnbull (o.g) 60', Bencherif 67'	5,470
22 February 2011	Morecambe	H	2–0	Hamshaw 21', McCready (o.g) 26'	1,286
26 February 2011	Wycombe Wanderers	H	0–1		1,622
5 March 2011	Port Vale	A	1–2	Barnett 90'	5,459
8 March 2011	Crewe Alexandra	H	1–0	Draper 41'	1,485
12 March 2011	Northampton Town	A	1–0	Daniel 54'	4,707
15 March 2011	Lincoln City	H	1–1	Wedgbury 90'	1,067
19 March 2011	Torquay United	H	3–3	Barnett 29', Daniel 35', Bencherif 57'	1,556
22 March 2011	Morecambe	A	2–1	Bencherif 43', Barnett 56'	1,612
26 March 2011	Stevenage	H	0–4		1,346
30 March 2011	Burton Albion	A	2–3	Sinclair 1', 81'	1,974
2 April 2011	Shrewsbury Town	A	1–4	Bencherif 19'	5,396
5 April 2011	Bradford City	H	0–1		1,207
8 April 2011	Accrington Stanley	H	2–2	Bencherif 22', Mukendi 90'	1,674
16 April 2011	Chesterfield	A	1–2	Chalmers (pen) 45'	8,206
23 April 2011	Cheltenham Town	A	1–0	Barnett 27'	2,757
25 April 2011	Southend United	H	0–0		1,427
30 April 2011	Gillingham	A	4–2	Draper 3', Daniel 7', 17', Sinclair 48'	6,841
7 May 2011	Hereford United	H	1–1	Chalmers (pen) 57'	2,013

=== FA Cup ===
Win	Draw	Loss

Date	Round	Opponent	Venue	Result	Attendance	Scorers
6 November 2010	First round	Southend United	H	2–2	1,582	Daniel 8', Brown 47'
16 November 2010	First round replay	Southend United	A	2–2 (a.e.t.) (Note: Macclesfield win 5–3 on pens)	2,194	Sinclair 61', Nsiala 99'
27 November 2010	Second round	Huddersfield Town	A	0–6	4,924	

=== League Cup ===
Win	Draw	Loss

Date	Round	Opponent	Venue	Result	Attendance	Scorers
10 August 2010	First round	Leicester City	A	3–4	6,142	Brown 15', Mukendi 64', Daniel 83'

=== Football League Trophy ===
Win	Draw	Loss

Date	Round	Opponent	Venue	Result	Attendance	Scorers
31 August 2010	First round	Morecambe	H	1–0	720	Mukendi 42'
5 October 2010	Second round	Crewe Alexandra	H	2–4	1,103	Ada (o.g) 13', (o.g) 30'

== Appearances and goals ==
As of 6 May 2011.
(Substitute appearances in brackets)

No.	Pos.	Name	League		FA Cup		League Cup		League Trophy		Total		Discipline	
No.	Pos.	Name	Apps	Goals	Apps	Goals	Apps	Goals	Apps	Goals	Apps	Goals	Yellow card	Red card
1	GK	(Cape Verde) José Veiga	46	0	3	0	1	0	2	0	52	0	1	0
2	DF	(England) Izak Reid	34 (3)	1	2	0	0	0	1	0	37 (3)	1	4	0
3	DF	(England) Carl Tremarco	20 (5)	0	1 (1)	0	1	0	1	0	23 (6)	0	5	1
4	MF	(Algeria) Hamza Bencherif	36 (5)	11	2	0	1	0	2	0	41 (5)	11	5	0
5	DF	(England) Nat Brown	44	2	3	1	1	1	2	0	50	4	2	0
6	DF	(Northern Ireland) Paul Morgan	27 (1)	0	3	0	0	0	2	0	32 (1)	0	2	0
7	MF	(England) Lewis Chalmers	22 (8)	2	3	0	0 (1)	0	2	0	27 (9)	2	1	0
8	MF	(England) Ross Draper	34 (6)	5	2 (1)	0	0	0	0	0	36 (7)	5	9	0
9	FW	(England) Emile Sinclair	26 (5)	5	2	1	1	0	1	0	30 (5)	6	3	1
10	FW	(Jamaica) Ricky Sappleton	1 (9)	1	0	0	0	0	0	0	1 (9)	1	0	1
11	FW	(England) Colin Daniel	36 (7)	7	3	1	1	1	2	0	42 (7)	9	3	0
12	DF	(England) Jason Beardsley	0	0	0	0	0	0	1	0	1	0	0	0
14	DF	(Wales) Aristote Nsiala	10	0	3	1	0	0	0	0	13	1	3	0
14	DF	(France) Tony Diagne	19 (1)	0	0	0	0	0	0	0	19 (1)	0	5	0
15	MF	(England) Paul Bolland	31 (1)	2	3	1	1	0	1 (1)	0	36 (2)	2	4	0
16	DF	(England) Shaun Brisley	12 (2)	0	0	0	1	0	0 (1)	0	13 (3)	0	2	0
17	MF	(England) Sam Wedgbury	13 (10)	1	0	0	0 (1)	0	1 (1)	0	14 (12)	1	2	0
19	DF	(England) Matt Lowe	0 (1)	0	0	0	0	0	0	0	0 (1)	0	0	0
20	MF	(England) Matt Hamshaw	18 (10)	2	0 (1)	0	1	0	1	0	20 (11)	2	0	0
21	MF	(England) Richard Butcher	5 (2)	1	0	0	1	0	0 (1)	0	6 (3)	1	0	0
22	DF	(England) Dan Gray	18 (3)	1	0	0	0	0	0	0	18 (3)	1	1	0
23	FW	(England) Tyrone Barnett	45	13	3	0	1	0	1 (1)	0	50 (1)	13	7	0
24	FW	(England) Vinny Mukendi	8 (13)	1	0 (3)	0	0 (1)	1	2	1	10 (17)	3	5	0
26	MF	(England) Adam Roberts	0 (2)	0	0	0	0	0	0	0	0 (2)	0	0	0
33	DF	(Wales) Elliott Hewitt	1	0	0	0	0	0	0	0	1	0	0	0

== Awards ==
End of Season Awards	Winner
Fans Player of the Season	Tyrone Barnett
Players' Player of the Season	Paul Bolland

== Transfers ==
Players transferred in
Date	Pos.	Name	From	Fee	Ref.
9 May 2010	FW	(England) Tyrone Barnett	(England) Hednesford Town	Free	
20 May 2010	MF	(England) Richard Butcher	(England) Lincoln City	Free	
30 June 2010	MF	(England) Lewis Chalmers	(England) Aldershot Town	Free	
30 June 2010	MF	(England) Sam Wedgbury	(England) Sheffield United	Free	
26 July 2010	MF	(England) Matt Hamshaw	(England) Notts County	Free	
29 July 2010	GK	(England) Jack Cudworth	(Wales) Rhyl	Free	
31 July 2010	DF	(England) Jason Beardsley	(United States) FC Tampa Bay	Free	
18 January 2011	DF	(France) Tony Diagne	(France) Aubervilliers	Free	
19 January 2011	FW	(England) Simon Yeo	(England) New Mills	Free	
Players loaned in
Date from	Pos.	Name	From	Date to	Ref.
8 October 2010	DF	(Wales) Aristote Nsiala	(England) Everton	4 January 2011	
1 January 2011	DF	(England) Dan Gray	(England) Chesterfield	End of season	
Players loaned out
Date from	Pos.	Name	To	Date to	Ref.
25 October 2010	DF	(England) Jason Beardsley	(England) Eastwood Town	25 November 2010	
29 October 2010	MF	(England) Michael Thomas	(England) Mossley	30 January 2011	
26 November 2010	MF	(England) Adam Roberts	(England) Northwich Victoria	26 December 2010	
25 January 2011	MF	(England) Sam Wedgbury	(England) Altrincham	25 February 2011	
18 February 2011	MF	(England) Adam Roberts	(England) Northwich Victoria	18 March 2011	
10 March 2011	DF	(England) Matt Lowe	(England) Kidderminster Harriers	End of season	
Players released
Date	Pos.	Name	Subsequent club	Join date	Ref.
21 May 2010	MF	(England) Lee Bell	(England) Crewe Alexandra	1 July 2010	
4 June 2010	FW	(England) Craig Lindfield	(England) Accrington Stanley	1 July 2010	
30 June 2010	GK	(England) Jonny Brain	(England) Walsall	1 July 2010	
1 July 2010	MF	(England) Steve Reed	(England) Chelmsford City	13 July 2010	
1 July 2010	FW	(England) Kyle Wilson	(England) Hyde	20 July 2010	
1 July 2010	MF	(England) Scott Beckett	(Wales) Rhyl	22 July 2010	
1 July 2010	FW	(Wales) Matthew Tipton	(Republic of Ireland) Dundalk	29 July 2010	
1 July 2010	DF	(England) Sean Hessey	(England) Accrington Stanley	3 August 2010	
1 July 2010	FW	(England) Kristian Dennis	(England) Woodley Sports	16 August 2010	
1 July 2010	DF	(England) Adam Jukes	(England) Warrington Town	?? October 2010	
1 July 2010	FW	(England) Ben Wright	(New Zealand) Richmond Athletic	12 January 2011	
1 July 2010	FW	(England) John Rooney	(United States) New York Red Bulls	13 January 2011 (Bosman)	
1 July 2010	MF	(Belgium) François Kompany	Unattached		
