= Elliott Hewitt =

Welsh footballer (born 1994)

Personal information
- Full name: Elliott Jack Hewitt
- Date of birth: 30 May 1994 (age 32)
- Place of birth: Rhyl, Wales
- Height: 6 ft 3 in (1.91 m)
- Positions: Defender; midfielder

Team information
- Current team: Mansfield Town
- Number: 4

Youth career
- Macclesfield Town

Senior career*
Years	Team	Apps	(Gls)
2011–2012	Macclesfield Town	22	(0)
2012–2015	Ipswich Town	14	(0)
2013–2014	→ Gillingham (loan)	20	(0)
2014–2015	→ Colchester United (loan)	21	(1)
2015–2019	Notts County	135	(8)
2019–2021	Grimsby Town	57	(1)
2021–	Mansfield Town	132	(3)

International career^{‡}
2011	Wales U17	3	(0)
2011–2014	Wales U21	10	(0)
- * Club domestic league appearances and goals as of 26 January 2026 (UTC) ‡ National team caps and goals as of 22:19, 9 September 2014 (UTC)

Elliott Jack Hewitt (born 30 May 1994) is a Welsh professional footballer who plays as a defender or midfielder for EFL League One club Mansfield Town.

He began his career at Macclesfield Town, where he graduated from the club's youth system. He joined Ipswich Town in 2012. He spent three years at Ipswich, spending time on loan at Gillingham and Colchester United before joining Notts County in 2015. He made over one hundred appearances in four seasons for Notts County. He signed for Grimsby Town in 2019 and played 66 games in a two-year spell with the club before joining Mansfield in 2021.

== Club career ==
=== Macclesfield Town ===
Born in Rhyl, Denbighshire, Wales, Hewitt progressed through the Macclesfield Town youth ranks and signed his first professional contract in 2010. He made his professional debut in the last game of the 2010–11 season on 7 May 2011, in the EFL League Two 1–1 draw with Hereford United at Moss Rose. He started the 2011–12 season as first choice right back at the club.

=== Ipswich Town ===
Hewitt signed a three-year contract with Ipswich Town on 30 May 2012. He travelled with the first team squad on their pre-season tour of the Netherlands, despite continuing his rehabilitation following a hip impingement injury.

==== Gillingham (loan) ====
On 13 November 2013, Hewitt signed a 28-day loan with League One side Gillingham. His loan was apparently cut short due to an injury in early December, but on 31 December, Hewitt again signed on loan with Gillingham.

==== Colchester United (loan) ====
Hewitt joined Colchester United on a month's loan in October 2014 to provide additional options at the back. He was recalled by Town at the end of his first month, but returned soon afterwards for a second stint. Having been used briefly as a winger during his time at Ipswich, U's boss Tony Humes began to use him in this position over the course of the season, exploiting his attacking nature and pace. He scored his first senior goal against Peterborough United on 10 January 2015, a solo run from his own half to finish from 20 yards.

==== Notts County ====
Hewitt joined Notts County in the summer of 2015 after leaving Ipswich. He featured 137 times for County across 4 seasons before being released at the end of the 2018-19 season.

He later joined Mansfield after departing Grimsby Town. On 7 May 2025 the club announced it had triggered an extension to the player's contract. On 19 May 2026, Mansfield said the player had signed a contract extension.

== International career ==
Hewitt started his international career earning Wales schoolboy honours. He was first called up to the Wales U17 squad for the Four Nations Tournament in July 2011 in Falkenberg, Sweden. He started in all three matches against Iceland U17, Norway U17 and Sweden U17. His form in this tournament led Brian Flynn to call him up on standby for the Wales U21 squad for the game against Hungary U21 on 10 August 2011. Hewitt did feature in the game, coming on as a half time substitute for David Stephens, in the 2–1 defeat. In January 2013 he was selected in the Wales under 21 squad for the friendly match against Iceland on 6 February 2013

== Career statistics ==
As of match played 7 April 2023

Appearances and goals by club, season and competition
Club	Season	League			FA Cup		League Cup		Other		Total	
Club	Season	Division	Apps	Goals	Apps	Goals	Apps	Goals	Apps	Goals	Apps	Goals
Macclesfield Town	2010–11	League Two	1	0	0	0	0	0	0	0	1	0
Macclesfield Town	2011–12	League Two	21	0	2	0	1	0	0	0	24	0
Macclesfield Town	Total		22	0	2	0	1	0	0	0	25	0
Ipswich Town	2012–13	Championship	7	0	1	0	0	0	—		8	0
Ipswich Town	2013–14	Championship	4	0	0	0	0	0	—		4	0
Ipswich Town	2014–15	Championship	3	0	0	0	1	0	0	0	4	0
Ipswich Town	Total		14	0	1	0	1	0	0	0	16	0
Gillingham (loan)	2013–14	League One	20	0	0	0	0	0	0	0	20	0
Colchester United (loan)	2014–15	League One	21	1	2	0	0	0	1 (Note: Appearance(s) in Football League Trophy)	0	24	1
Notts County	2015–16	League Two	38	0	1	0	1	0	1	0	41	0
Notts County	2016–17	League Two	29	2	1	0	0	0	3 (Note: Appearance(s) in EFL Trophy)	0	33	2
Notts County	2017–18	League Two	43	4	4	0	0	0	3 (Note: One appearance in EFL Trophy, two appearances in League Two play-offs)	0	50	4
Notts County	2018–19	League Two	25	2	1	0	1	0	3	0	30	2
Notts County	Total		135	8	7	0	2	0	10	0	154	8
Grimsby Town	2019–20	League Two	20	0	1	0	3	0	3	0	27	0
Grimsby Town	2020–21	League Two	37	1	0	0	1	0	1	0	39	1
Grimsby Town	Total		57	1	1	0	4	0	4	0	66	1
Mansfield Town	2021–22	League Two	43	1	3	0	0	0	3	0	49	1
Mansfield Town	2022–23	League Two	35	1	2	0	1	0	4	0	42	1
Mansfield Town	Total		78	2	5	0	1	0	7	0	91	2
Career total			347	12	18	0	9	0	22	0	396	12

== Honours ==
Mansfield Town

- EFL League Two third-place promotion: 2023–24

Individual

- Mansfield Town Player of the Year: 2022
