= Matthew Lowe =

Matthew Lowe is the name of:

- Matthew Lowe (footballer, born 1990)
- Matt Lowe (footballer, born 1996)
- Matthew Lowe (swimmer) (born 1994)
