= Sam Wedgbury =

English footballer (born 1989)

Personal information
- Full name: Samuel Wedgbury
- Date of birth: 26 February 1989 (age 37)
- Place of birth: Oldbury, England
- Positions: Defender; midfielder

Team information
- Current team: Worksop Town

Youth career
- 2005: Worcester City
- 2006–2008: Sheffield United

Senior career*
Years	Team	Apps	(Gls)
2005–2006	Worcester City	10	(0)
2006–2010	Sheffield United	0	(0)
2008	→ Mansfield Town (loan)	1	(0)
2009–2010	→ Ferencváros (loan)	17	(2)
2010–2013	Macclesfield Town	100	(2)
2011	→ Altrincham (loan)	6	(1)
2013–2014	Stevenage	14	(0)
2014–2017	Forest Green Rovers	86	(0)
2017–2018	Wrexham	41	(1)
2018–2020	Chesterfield	16	(0)
2020–2021	Buxton	5	(0)
2021–2022	Stalybridge Celtic	40	(1)
2022–	Worksop Town	90	(0)
Total		426	(7)

International career
2013	England C	1	(0)
- * Club domestic league appearances and goals as of 12:13, 4 July 2025 (UTC)

Samuel Wedgbury (born 26 February 1989) is an English footballer who plays as a central midfielder.

Wedgbury began his career at Worcester City in 2005 and became the club's youngest ever goalscorer after scoring on his debut aged 16. He attracted the interest of Sheffield United, and joined the club for a five-figure fee in January 2006. He made no first-team appearances during his time in South Yorkshire, although was loaned out twice; first to Mansfield Town and then to Hungarian club Ferencváros. He was released by Sheffield United upon the expiry of his contract in the summer of 2010, and signed for Macclesfield Town shortly after. He spent three seasons at Macclesfield, playing over 100 games. In May 2013, Wedgbury signed for Stevenage on a free transfer. In May 2014, he joined Forest Green Rovers, where he became a fan favourite for his guile, character and uncompromising style of play. He signed for Chesterfield on 22 May 2018 after his contract with Wrexham was cancelled by mutual consent. He has also represented the England C team.

== Club career ==
=== Early career ===
Wedgbury started his career at non-league Worcester City in the summer of 2005, where he played regularly for the club's U18 and reserve sides despite being in a younger age bracket. He made a goalscoring debut for the first-team aged just 16, in an FA Cup tie against Bemerton Heath Harlequins, a match that Worcester won 7–0, and became the club's youngest ever goalscorer in the process. He attracted the interest of then-Championship side Sheffield United in January 2006, and subsequently signed for the club on a scholarship contract for a five-figure fee. On Wedgbury's move, Worcester chairman Dave Boddy stated: "I am delighted for Sam, it's a great deal and opportunity for him and obviously a great deal for the club. He is a lovely lad with a superb attitude to the game and he shows unbelievable maturity beyond his years". He was loaned back to Worcester for the remainder of the 2005–06 season, with the two clubs also arranging a pre-season friendly as part of the deal. Wedgbury played regularly for Sheffield United's youth and reserve teams during his first season there, but did not make any first-team appearances.

In October 2008, Wedgbury was loaned out to Conference National side Mansfield Town on a one-month deal to gain more first-team experience. He made his debut a day after signing, on 18 October, starting in the club's 2–1 home defeat to Wrexham. However, he suffered an injury in the match and had to be substituted in the 42nd minute. Although the injury was not a broken leg as first thought, Wedgbury had chipped a bone in his leg and ultimately returned to his parent club to undergo treatment. He was loaned out once again in January 2009, this time to Sheffield United's Hungarian sister club Ferencváros, for the remainder of the 2009–10 campaign. Wedgbury made his first-team debut for Ferencváros two weeks later, on 8 February 2009, in a 0–0 draw with Kecskeméti in the Hungarian League Cup. He went on to play 17 league games for the club, scoring two goals, before returning to Bramall Lane a month into the 2009–10 season. However, on his return Wedgbury was unable to break into the first-team and was released from his contract upon its expiry in May 2010.

=== Macclesfield Town ===
Following his release from Sheffield United, Wedgbury signed a one-year contract at then-League Two side Macclesfield Town on 6 July 2010. He made his debut for Macclesfield on the opening day of the 2010–11 season, starting in a 2–2 draw against Stevenage at Broadhall Way. Wedgbury made thirteen appearances during the first half of the season, before being loaned out for a month to Conference North side Altrincham in January 2011, having been out of the Macclesfield first-team for two months. Wedgbury made a goalscoring debut for Altrincham, restoring parity just before half-time as the club came from behind to defeat Hayes & Yeading at Moss Lane. He played six times during the brief loan agreement, before returning to his parent club in late February 2011. Wedgbury regained his place in the Macclesfield first-team on his return, and played regularly for the remainder of the campaign. He scored his first goal for Macclesfield in a 1–1 draw with Lincoln City on 15 March 2011, scoring with an injury-time volley from outside the area to earn the club a point. During his first season with the club, Wedgbury scored once in 26 appearances. Wedgbury's impressive performances earned him an offer of a two-year contract at the end of the season, which he ultimately signed on 10 May 2011.

The 2011–12 season was Wedgbury's breakthrough year of regular first-team football, and he impressed as he made 47 appearances, of which 45 were starting, in what was a difficult season for the club as they suffered relegation to the Conference National. Wedgbury scored once during the campaign, a low volley from George Donnelly's cross in a 2–2 draw with fellow strugglers Hereford United at Moss Rose in March 2012. He was described as "visibly distraught" following Macclesfield's 2–0 defeat to Burton Albion, the game that confirmed the club's relegation, and he stated – "It was a sad day. We feel we've let the fans, the club, the board, everyone down. It's the first time I've experienced anything like that in my career. I'm devastated. We're truly sorry, we've let our loyal fans down after 15 years in the Football League and we know we're to blame". He remained at Macclesfield for the 2012–13 season despite a mass overhaul of players over the summer, and started in the club's first game back in the Conference, which ended in a 2–1 loss to Hereford United at Edgar Street. Wedgbury was once again a regular throughout the season, making 43 appearances in all competitions. He particularly impressed during Macclesfield's FA Cup run during the season, as they defeated Cardiff City in the Third Round, before bowing out in the next round following a narrow 1–0 defeat to eventual winners, Wigan Athletic. After Macclesfield's 2–1 victory over Cambridge United on 20 April 2013, the club's final game of the season, Wedgbury was voted as both Fans and Players' Player of the Year. During his three seasons at Macclesfield, Wedgbury made 116 appearances and scored twice.

=== Stevenage ===
His contract at Macclesfield expired at the end of the season, and Wedgbury subsequently signed for League One side Stevenage on 21 May 2013. He made his Stevenage debut on the opening day of the 2013–14 season, playing the whole match at right-back in a 4–3 home defeat to Oldham Athletic. On 12 May 2014, Wedgbury left Stevenage by mutual consent.

=== Forest Green Rovers ===
On 12 May 2014, Wedgbury joined Forest Green Rovers in the Conference National on a two-year contract. He made his debut for the club on 9 August 2014 playing the full 90 minutes in a 1–0 away win against Southport. He helped the club to their first ever Conference National play-offs only to be knocked out in the semi-finals in a two-legged tie with Bristol Rovers.

In April 2016, an anterior cruciate ligament injury picked up in a home match against FC Halifax Town saw him ruled out with a nine-month injury lay-off. He missed Forest Green's 2015–16 National League play-off campaign, although was shown loyalty by the club and signed a new one-year contract in May 2016. On 14 May 2017, he appeared as a substitute in the 2017 National League play-off final at Wembley Stadium to help Forest Green secure promotion to the Football League for the first time in their history in a 3–1 win over Tranmere Rovers. A few days later, after Forest Green's promotion to League Two, Wedgbury was released from the club alongside four other players.

=== Wrexham ===
In May 2017 Wedgbury signed a one-year deal with Wrexham. He signed a one-year contract extension in February 2018, however the contract was cancelled by mutual consent in May 2018.

=== Chesterfield ===
Wedgbury signed to play for Chesterfield during the 2018–19 season. He made his debut coming on as a 69th-minute substitute during the first home game of the season against Aldershot Town on 7 August. Chesterfield won the game 3–0. He was released by Chesterfield at the end of the 2019–20 season.

=== Buxton ===
On 1 August 2020, Wedgbury signed for Buxton.

=== Stalybridge Celtic ===
In May 2021 he joined Stalybridge Celtic.

=== Worksop Town ===
On 10 June 2022, Wedgbury joined Worksop Town.

On 3 July 2025, Wedgbury announced his retirement from football.

On 8 November 2025, Worksop Town FC announced Wedgbury would return to the club and come out of retirement.

== International career ==
Wedgbury was called up to represent the England C team in January 2013, for the International Challenge Trophy semi-final tie against Turkey U23s. He played the whole match in England's 1–0 defeat to a strong Turkish side at Princes Park on 5 February.

== Personal life ==
Born in Oldbury, West Midlands, Wedgbury states he "comes from a working-class family" and that he has been brought up to work hard. His mother is the manager at a care home and his father a self-employed builder, and he believes he would probably be working with his father if he "hadn't been playing football".

- His cousin is ex Chelsea footballer Jacob Mellis.

== Honours ==
Worksop Town

- Northern Premier League Premier Division play-offs: 2024–25
- Northern Premier League Division One East: 2022–23
- Sheffield & Hallamshire Senior Cup: 2023–24, 2024–25

Individual

- Macclesfield Town Player of the Year: 2012–13

== Career statistics ==
As of end of 2024–25 season

Appearances and goals by club, season and competition
Club	Season	League			National Cup		League Cup		Other		Total	
Club	Season	Division	Apps	Goals	Apps	Goals	Apps	Goals	Apps	Goals	Apps	Goals
Worcester City	2005–06	Conference North	10	0	3	1	—		0	0	13	1
Sheffield United	2008–09	Championship	0	0	0	0	0	0	0	0	0	0
Sheffield United	2009–10	Championship	0	0	0	0	0	0	—		0	0
Sheffield United	Total		0	0	0	0	0	0	0	0	0	0
Mansfield Town (loan)	2008–09	Conference Premier	1	0	0	0	—		0	0	1	0
Ferencváros (loan)	2008–09	Nemzeti Bajnokság II	11	1	0	0	2	0	—		13	1
Ferencváros (loan)	2009–10	Nemzeti Bajnokság I	6	1	0	0	2	0	—		8	1
Ferencváros (loan)	Total		17	2	0	0	4	0	—		21	2
Macclesfield Town	2010–11	League Two	23	1	0	0	1	0	2 (Note: Appearance(s) in Football League Trophy)	0	26	1
Macclesfield Town	2011–12	League Two	39	1	5	0	2	0	1	0	47	1
Macclesfield Town	2012–13	Conference Premier	38	0	6	0	—		2 (Note: One appearance in FA Trophy; one appearance in Cheshire Senior Cup)	0	46	0
Macclesfield Town	Total		100	2	11	0	3	0	5	0	119	2
Altrincham (loan)	2010–11	Conference Premier	6	1	—		—		—		6	1
Stevenage	2013–14	League One	14	0	2	0	1	0	3	0	20	0
Forest Green Rovers	2014–15	Conference Premier	37	0	2	0	—		5 (Note: Three appearances in FA Trophy; two appearance in Conference Premier play-offs)	0	44	0
Forest Green Rovers	2015–16	National League	38	0	3	0	—		1 (Note: Appearance(s) in FA Trophy)	0	42	0
Forest Green Rovers	2016–17	National League	11	0	0	0	—		3 (Note: One appearance in FA Trophy; two appearances in National League play-offs)	0	14	0
Forest Green Rovers	Total		86	0	5	0	—		9	0	100	0
Wrexham	2017–18	National League	41	1	1	0	—		0	0	42	1
Chesterfield	2018–19	National League	3	0	0	0	—		0	0	3	0
Chesterfield	2019–20	National League	13	0	1	0	—		0	0	14	0
Chesterfield	Total		16	0	1	0	—		0	0	17	0
Buxton	2020–21	Northern Premier League Premier Division	5	0	1	0	—		0	0	6	0
Stalybridge Celtic	2021–22	Northern Premier League Premier Division	40	1	1	0	—		3	0	44	1
Worksop Town	2022–23	Northern Premier League Division One East	32	0	4	0	—		3	0	39	0
Worksop Town	2023–24	Northern Premier League Premier Division	30	0	6	0	—		5 (Note: Three appearances in Sheffield & Hallamshire Senior Cup, one appearance in FA Trophy, one appearance in Northern Premier League Premier Division play-offs)	0	41	0
Worksop Town	2024–25	Northern Premier League Premier Division	28	0	3	0	—		7 (Note: Three appearances in Sheffield & Hallamshire Senior Cup, three appearances in FA Trophy, one appearance in Northern Premier League Premier Division play-offs)	0	38	0
Worksop Town	Total		90	0	13	0	0	0	15	0	118	0
Career total			426	7	38	1	8	0	35	0	507	8
