= Steve Collis =

English footballer and coach (born 1981)

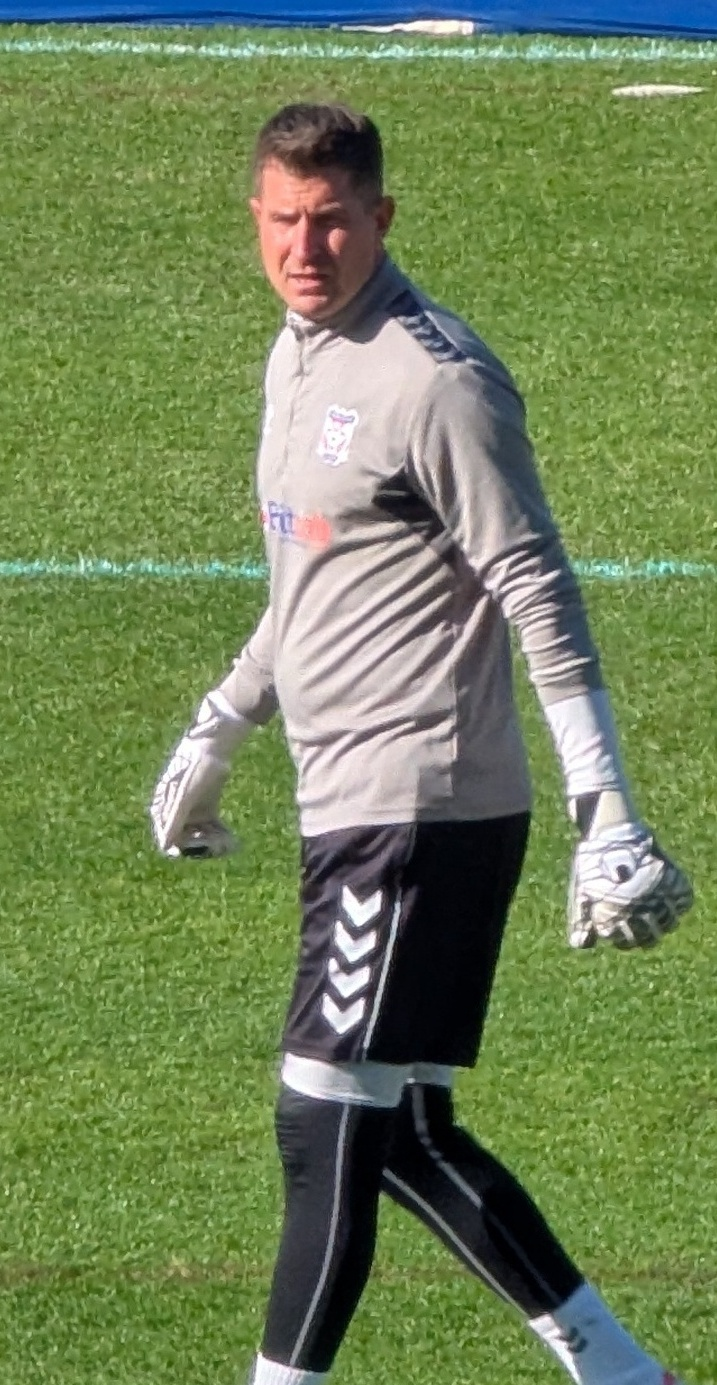
- Collis in 2026

Personal information
- Full name: Stephen Philip Collis
- Date of birth: 18 March 1981 (age 45)
- Place of birth: Harrow, England
- Height: 6 ft 3 in (1.91 m)
- Position: Goalkeeper

Team information
- Current team: York city (goalkeeping coach)

Youth career
- Watford

Senior career*
Years	Team	Apps	(Gls)
1999–2000	Barnet	0	(0)
2000–2001	Nottingham Forest	0	(0)
2001–2006	Yeovil Town	47	(0)
2002	→ Aldershot Town (loan)	3	(0)
2002	→ Tiverton Town (loan)	15	(0)
2006–2008	Southend United	21	(0)
2008–2010	Crewe Alexandra	19	(0)
2010	Bristol City	0	(0)
2010	→ Torquay United (loan)	1	(0)
2010–2011	Peterborough United	0	(0)
2011	→ Northampton Town (loan)	4	(0)
2011–2012	Macclesfield Town	0	(0)
2012–2013	Buxton	6	(0)
2013–2018	Rochdale	0	(0)
Total		116	(0)
- * Club domestic league appearances and goals

Stephen Philip Collis (born 18 March 1981) is an English former professional footballer who is currently the goalkeeping coach at York City.

== Club career ==
=== Barnet & Nottingham Forest ===
Collis began his career in the youth team at Watford before moving to Barnet and then signing for Nottingham Forest in 2000.

=== Yeovil Town ===
After failing to break into the first team at Nottingham Forest, Collis was invited down by Gary Johnson for a trial match at Yeovil Town and signed the same month on a free transfer. Collis went on to make over forty appearances for the South West outfit. During his stay at Yeovil, Collis spent short loan spells at Tiverton Town and Aldershot Town with failed talks also from Exeter City. Throughout his spell with Yeovil Collis acted as back-up to Chris Weale who was much in favour at the time.

=== Southend ===
After leaving Yeovil, Collis signed a two-year contract in 2006 to become Southend's first signing ahead of the new season in The Championship, but was released by the club at the end of the 2007–08 season.

=== Crewe Alexandra ===
Following his spell at Southend, Collis signed for Crewe Alexandra as a replacement for departing goalkeeper Ben Williams. His first game in goal saw him save a penalty. On 1 January 2010, Crewe agreed to terminate his contract after he had lost his place to on-loan keeper John Ruddy.

=== Bristol City ===
In January 2010, Collis joined back up with Gary Johnson and signed a short-term deal for Football League Championship side Bristol City to take him to the end of the season.

Collis joined Torquay United on a seven-day emergency loan deal on 6 May 2010, for Torquay's final game of the season against Notts County. Collis was released by Bristol City at the end of the season.

=== Peterborough United ===
Collis signed a short-term deal with Peterborough United on 6 August 2010. He was then released after his loan move to Northampton Town when Peterborough invested in Exeter City Keeper Paul Jones.

=== Macclesfield Town ===
He signed for Macclesfield Town on 23 September 2011 on a short-term contract until January 2012 to provide cover for José Veiga.

=== Buxton ===
Collis was signed by Buxton manager Martin McIntosh at the start of the 2012–13 season after participating in several pre-season matches for the Northern Premier League Premier Division side.

=== Rochdale ===
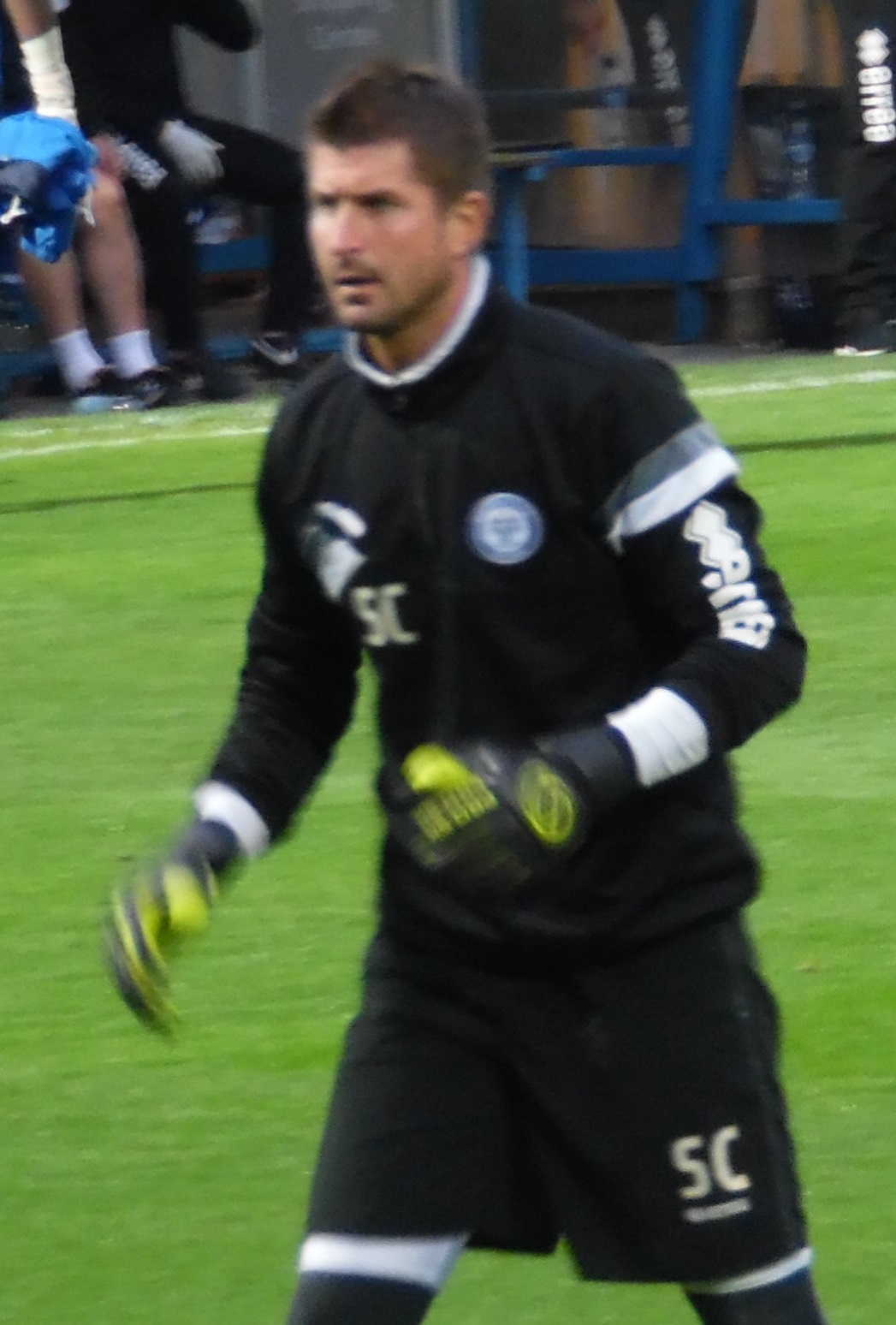
Collis training with Rochdale in 2015

On 29 January 2013, Collis signed a short-term deal with Rochdale to take him to the summer. "Goalkeeper Steve Collis was drafted in on Thursday as a replacement for Ben Smith who has departed the club in a bid to find regular football closer to home. Hill explains more: "It is difficult with the 'keeper situation because you're either in goal or you're on the bench. As a centre half you may be able to play full back or in midfield so you've got alternatives, but it's not very often that a goalkeeper will get replaced. It was an ideal situation to get Steve here as he's got experience."

== Career statistics ==
Appearances and goals by club, season and competition
Club	Season	League			FA Cup		League Cup		Other		Total	
Club	Season	Division	Apps	Goals	Apps	Goals	Apps	Goals	Apps	Goals	Apps	Goals
Barnet	1999–2000	Third Division	0	0	0	0	0	0	0	0	0	0
Nottingham Forest	2000–01	First Division	0	0	0	0	0	0	0	0	0	0
Yeovil Town	2001–02	Conference	2	0	0	0	0	0	0	0	2	0
Yeovil Town	2002–03	Conference	1	0	0	0	0	0	0	0	1	0
Yeovil Town	2003–04	Third Division	11	0	0	0	0	0	1 (Note: Appearance(s) in Football League Trophy)	0	12	0
Yeovil Town	2004–05	League Two	10	0	0	0	0	0	1	0	11	0
Yeovil Town	2005–06	League One	23	0	1	0	0	0	0	0	24	0
Yeovil Town	Total		47	0	1	0	0	0	2	0	50	0
Aldershot Town (loan)	2001–02	Isthmian League Premier	3	0	0	0	0	0	0	0	3	0
Tiverton Town (loan)	2002–03	Southern League Premier	15	0	0	0	0	0	0	0	15	0
Southend United	2006–07	Championship	1	0	0	0	0	0	0	0	1	0
Southend United	2007–08	League One	20	0	3	0	2	0	1	0	26	0
Southend United	Total		21	0	3	0	2	0	1	0	27	0
Crewe Alexandra	2008–09	League One	18	0	2	0	3	0	2	0	25	0
Crewe Alexandra	2009–10	League Two	1	0	0	0	0	0	0	0	1	0
Crewe Alexandra	Total		19	0	2	0	3	0	2	0	26	0
Bristol City	2009–10	Championship	0	0	0	0	0	0	0	0	0	0
Torquay United (loan)	2009–10	League Two	1	0	0	0	0	0	0	0	1	0
Peterborough United	2010–11	League One	0	0	0	0	0	0	0	0	0	0
Northampton Town (loan)	2010–11	League Two	4	0	0	0	0	0	0	0	4	0
Macclesfield Town	2011–12	League Two	0	0	0	0	0	0	1	0	1	0
Buxton	2012–13	NPL Premier Division	6	0	0	0	0	0	0	0	6	0
Rochdale	2012–13	League Two	0	0	0	0	0	0	0	0	0	0
Rochdale	2013–14	League Two	0	0	0	0	0	0	0	0	0	0
Rochdale	2014–15	League One	0	0	0	0	0	0	0	0	0	0
Rochdale	2015–16	League One	0	0	0	0	0	0	0	0	0	0
Rochdale	2016–17	League One	0	0	0	0	0	0	0	0	0	0
Rochdale	2017–18	League One	0	0	0	0	0	0	0	0	0	0
Rochdale	Total		0	0	0	0	0	0	0	0	26	0
Career total			116	0	6	0	5	0	6	0	133	0

== Coaching career ==
At the end of his playing career he became a player/goalkeeping coach with Rochdale where he spent 5 years before officially hanging up his boots in 2018 upon his departure. Collis then joined former colleague Chris Beech as goalkeeping coach at Carlisle United in August 2020. In July 2021, he made the move to Oldham Athletic, again in the role of goalkeeper coach. Oldham Athletic were relegated from the football league at the end of the 2021–2022 season.

On 5 June 2024, Collis joined Notts County as goalkeeper coach.

In November 2025, Collis joined National League club York City as goalkeeping coach, reuniting with former Notts County manager Stuart Maynard.
