= Matt Hamshaw =

English footballer

Personal information
- Full name: Matthew Thomas Hamshaw
- Date of birth: 1 January 1982 (age 44)
- Place of birth: Rotherham, England
- Height: 5 ft 9 in (1.75 m)
- Position: Midfielder

Team information
- Current team: Sheffield Wednesday (assistant coach)

Senior career*
Years	Team	Apps	(Gls)
2000–2005	Sheffield Wednesday	76	(2)
2005–2006	Stockport County	39	(5)
2006–2008	Mansfield Town	85	(6)
2008–2010	Notts County	61	(3)
2010–2012	Macclesfield Town	66	(4)
2012	Matlock Town	5	(1)
2012–2013	Stocksbridge Park Steels	42	(4)
Total		374	(25)

Managerial career
- 2025: Derby County (caretaker)
- 2025–2026: Rotherham United
- 2026: Sheffield Wednesday (caretaker)
- * Club domestic league appearances and goals

Matthew Thomas Hamshaw (born 1 January 1982) is an English professional football coach and former player, who is currently a assistant coach at Sheffield Wednesday.

He has previously played for Sheffield Wednesday, Stockport County, Mansfield Town and Notts County. He usually played on the right side of midfield. After his playing career, Hamshaw started coaching at Rotherham United before joining Derby County as first team coach, before leaving this role in February 2025, he also had two games in as caretaker head coach of Derby County in the same month.

== Playing career ==
=== Sheffield Wednesday ===
Born in Rotherham, South Yorkshire, Hamshaw came through the youth system at Sheffield Wednesday and represented England at schoolboy and under 18 level. He made his first-team debut in August 2000 and made 88 appearances, scoring four goals, in five seasons. After Sheffield Wednesday won the Football League One play-off final in May 2005, he was one of several players released by manager Paul Sturrock

=== Stockport County ===
He then joined Stockport County, where he was made captain and made 44 first-team appearances, scoring five goals in the 2005–06 season. He was released by Stockport at the end of the 2005–06 season.

=== Mansfield Town ===
In June 2006 he signed a two-year contract with Mansfield Town. After Mansfield Town were relegated to the Conference National at the end of the 2007–08 season, he was released by the club. Hamshaw had made over 90 appearances in all competitions for Mansfield Town.

=== Notts County ===
His next move was to join Notts County for two years. On 10 May 2010 it was announced that he had been released by Notts County along with 7 other players.

=== Macclesfield Town ===
On 26 July he signed for Macclesfield Town on a one-year deal. On 18 May 2011 he signed a further one-year extension contract at Macclesfield Town. In May 2012, Hamshaw was released by Macclesfield due to the expiry of his contract.

=== Matlock Town ===
In September 2012 he signed for Matlock Town of the Evo-Stik League Premier Division and scored on his debut against Blyth Spartans.

=== Stocksbridge Park Steels ===
In October 2012 he moved to Stocksbridge Park Steels.

== Coaching career ==
=== Rotherham United ===
As Hamshaw's playing career came to an end, he began working at Rotherham United in various coaching capacities. After his contract with relegated Macclesfield Town ran out in the summer of 2012, Matt made the switch into full-time coaching with the Millers, whilst continuing to play in the Evo-Stick League for Stocksbridge Park Steels. Taking on the role of Development Phase Lead Coach, he oversaw the development of the 12–16 year olds at New York, while he also coached youngsters at Thomas Rotherham College. He then became a first team coach under Paul Warne, before both left the club in September 2022.

=== Derby County ===
On 22 September 2022, Hamshaw was appointed first team coach at Derby County, working under head coach Paul Warne.

Following Warne's sacking on 7 February 2025, Hamshaw was appointed caretaker manager. A day later, Hamshaw oversaw a 1–1 draw at Norwich City which ended a run of seven consecutive defeats for Derby. He oversaw another draw; before the appointment of John Eustace as first-team head coach, Hamshaw kept his role as first-team coach under Eustace. Despite this, Hamshaw stepped down from his role at the club on 17 February 2025.

=== Return to Rotherham United ===
On 30 March 2025, following the sacking of Steve Evans, Hamshaw was appointed interim manager of Rotherham United until the end of the season.

On 15 April 2025, Rotherham United announced that Hamshaw agreed to become permanent manager on a three-year contract. On 18 March 2026, Hamshaw was sacked following a 5–0 defeat to Peterborough United that left the club six points from safety with nine games remaining.

=== Sheffield Wednesday ===
On 14 August 2026, Hamshaw agreed to become a first-team coach at League One club Sheffield Wednesday, to manager Henrik Pedersen. On 25 October 2026, Pedersen left the club and Hamshaw was placed in interim charge of the first team, taking charge of successive 1–1 draws against Cambridge United and Blackpool ahead of the appointment of Dave Challinor. Following the appointment of Challinor, Hamshaw remained with the first team staff as an assistant coach with Clint Hill and Antony Sweeney.

== Career statistics ==
Appearances and goals by club, season and competition
Club	Season	League			FA Cup		EFL Cup		Other		Total	
Club	Season	Division	Apps	Goals	Apps	Goals	Apps	Goals	Apps	Goals	Apps	Goals
Sheffield Wednesday	2000–01	First Division	18	0	1	1	3	1	—		22	2
Sheffield Wednesday	2001–02	First Division	21	0	1	1	4	1	—		26	2
Sheffield Wednesday	2002–03	First Division	15	1	0	0	2	0	—		17	1
Sheffield Wednesday	2003–04	Second Division	0	0	0	0	0	0	0	0	0	0
Sheffield Wednesday	2004–05	League One	22	1	1	0	0	0	0	0	23	1
Sheffield Wednesday	Total		76	2	3	2	9	2	0	0	88	4
Stockport County	2005–06	League Two	39	5	3	0	1	0	1 (Note: Appearances in Football League Trophy / EFL Trophy)	0	44	5
Mansfield Town	2006–07	League Two	40	4	3	0	2	0	1	0	46	4
Mansfield Town	2007–08	League Two	45	2	4	1	0	0	1	0	50	3
Mansfield Town	Total		85	6	7	1	2	0	2	0	96	7
Notts County	2008–09	League Two	41	3	2	0	2	0	1	0	46	3
Notts County	2009–10	League Two	20	0	3	0	1	0	0	0	24	0
Notts County	Total		61	3	5	0	3	0	1	0	70	3
Macclesfield Town	2010–11	League Two	28	2	1	0	1	0	1	0	31	2
Macclesfield Town	2011–12	League Two	38	2	5	1	2	0	1	0	46	3
Macclesfield Town	Total		66	4	6	1	3	0	2	0	77	5
Career total			327	20	24	4	18	2	6	0	375	26

== Managerial statistics ==
As of 1 November 2026

Managerial record by team and tenure
Team	From	To	Record					Ref.
Team	From	To	P	W	D	L	Win %	Ref.
Derby County (caretaker)	7 February 2025	13 February 2025	2	0	2	0	0.0	
Rotherham United	30 March 2025	18 March 2026	53	16	12	25	30.2	
Sheffield Wednesday (caretaker)	25 October 2026	2 November 2026	2	0	2	0	0.0	
Total			57	16	16	25	28.1	

== Honours ==
Notts County

- Football League Two: 2009–10
