= Carl Tremarco =

English footballer

Personal information
- Full name: Carl Philip Tremarco
- Date of birth: 11 October 1985 (age 41)
- Place of birth: Liverpool, England
- Position: Defender

Team information
- Current team: Brora Rangers (Asst. Manager)

Senior career*
| Years | Team | Apps | (Gls) |
| 2003–2008 | Tranmere Rovers | 52 | (1) |
| 2008–2009 | Wrexham | 27 | (0) |
| 2009 | → Darlington (loan) | 2 | (0) |
| 2009–2013 | Macclesfield Town | 89 | (0) |
| 2012–2013 | → Floriana (loan) | 22 | (1) |
| 2013–2020 | Inverness Caledonian Thistle | 161 | (10) |
| 2020–2021 | Ross County | 12 | (0) |
| Total | | 365 | (12) |
- * Club domestic league appearances and goals

Carl Philip Tremarco (born 11 October 1985) is an English retired professional footballer who played as a left-back. He is currently the assistant manager at Highland League club, Brora Rangers.

== Playing Career ==
Tremarco began his career as a trainee at Tranmere Rovers in August 2003 and made his first team debut in December 2003 against Hornchurch in the 2nd round of the FA Cup. He soon signed a full professional contract and made his first league appearances towards the end of the 2004–05 season.
The following season, Tremarco became a regular in the first team, making a total of 19 league appearances at left midfield and left back and scoring a single goal. The end of the 2005–06 season saw Tremarco sign a new two-year contract and he made a further 25 appearances in the 2006–07 season.

In January 2008, Tremarco joined Wrexham until the end of the season, after the club bought out the remaining four months of his contract with Tranmere. Following Wrexham's relegation to the Conference National in May 2008, he was out-of-contract but was offered, and signed, a two-year contract with the club.

It was announced on 2 June 2009 that Tremarco had signed a one-year deal for Macclesfield Town, and in May 2010, he signed a further two-year deal to stay with the Silkmen.

He joined Maltese Premier League side Floriana in August 2012, on loan, until the end of the 2012–13 season. He made 22 appearances for the Greens, scoring one goal against Qormi on the final day of the season.

Tremarco signed for Inverness Caledonian Thistle in July 2013. On 30 May 2015, he won the Scottish Cup with ICT, despite having been sent off for a last man foul. After having been a backup to Graeme Shinnie in his first two seasons, he established himself in the first team in 2015–16 after Shinnie's departure to Aberdeen. He quickly became a fan favourite in the Highlands. On 24 March 2018, in the final of the Scottish Challenge Cup, he scored a last minute winner, after an assist from Daniel Mackay, as Inverness beat Dumbarton 1–0. In July 2018, Tremarco was named club captain following the departure of previous captain Gary Warren.

On 16 July 2020, Tremarco joined Ross County on a one-year contract. He was released by County on 27 May 2021 along with nine other players. In June 2021, he announced his retirement from playing, joining the youth setup. In February 2024, after Derek Adams tendered his resignation, Tremarco, was promoted to be assistant manager to interim manager, Don Cowie, a role which he remained in until 20 June 2025, when Tremarco was relieved of his duties following Ross County's relegation to the Scottish Championship.

== Managerial career ==
In February 2024, after Derek Adams tendered his resignation, Tremarco was promoted to be assistant manager to interim manager, Don Cowie, a role which he remained in until 20 June 2025, when Tremarco was relieved of his duties following Ross County's relegation to the Scottish Championship.

On 20 August 2025, Tremarco joined Highland League club, Brora Rangers as assistant manager.

== Honours ==
Inverness Caledonian Thistle

- Scottish Cup : 2014–15
- Scottish Challenge Cup : 2017–18

== Career statistics ==
Appearances and goals by club, season and competition
| Club | Season | League | | | National Cup | | League Cup | | Other | | Total | |
| Club | Season | Division | Apps | Goals | Apps | Goals | Apps | Goals | Apps | Goals | Apps | Goals |
|---|---|---|---|---|---|---|---|---|---|---|---|---|
| Tranmere Rovers | 2003–04 | Second Division | 0 | 0 | 1 | 0 | 0 | 0 | 0 | 0 | 1 | 0 |
| Tranmere Rovers | 2004–05 | League One | 3 | 0 | 0 | 0 | 0 | 0 | 0 | 0 | 3 | 0 |
| Tranmere Rovers | 2005–06 | League One | 18 | 1 | 0 | 0 | 0 | 0 | 1 (Note: Appearances in the Football League Trophy) | 0 | 19 | 1 |
| Tranmere Rovers | 2006–07 | League One | 23 | 0 | 0 | 0 | 0 | 0 | 2 | 0 | 25 | 0 |
| Tranmere Rovers | 2007–08 | League One | 8 | 0 | 1 | 0 | 0 | 0 | 1 | 0 | 10 | 0 |
| Tranmere Rovers | Tranmere Total | | 52 | 1 | 2 | 0 | 0 | 0 | 4 | 0 | 58 | 1 |
| Wrexham | 2007–08 | League Two | 10 | 0 | 0 | 0 | 0 | 0 | 0 | 0 | 10 | 0 |
| Wrexham | 2008–09 | Conference Premier | 17 | 0 | 0 | 0 | — | | 0 | 0 | 17 | 0 |
| Wrexham | Wrexham Total | | 27 | 0 | 0 | 0 | 0 | 0 | 0 | 0 | 27 | 0 |
| Darlington (loan) | 2008–09 | League Two | 2 | 0 | 0 | 0 | 0 | 0 | 0 | 0 | 2 | 0 |
| Macclesfield Town | 2009–10 | League Two | 29 | 0 | 0 | 0 | 1 | 0 | 0 | 0 | 30 | 0 |
| Macclesfield Town | 2010–11 | League Two | 25 | 0 | 2 | 0 | 1 | 0 | 1 | 0 | 29 | 0 |
| Macclesfield Town | 2011–12 | League Two | 35 | 0 | 4 | 2 | 2 | 0 | 1 | 0 | 42 | 2 |
| Macclesfield Town | Macclesfield Total | | 89 | 0 | 6 | 2 | 4 | 0 | 2 | 0 | 101 | 2 |
| Floriana (loan) | 2012–13 | Maltese Premier League | 22 | 1 | 1 | 0 | — | | 0 | 0 | 23 | 1 |
| Inverness Caledonian Thistle | 2013–14 | Scottish Premiership | 21 | 0 | 1 | 0 | 2 | 0 | — | | 24 | 0 |
| Inverness Caledonian Thistle | 2014–15 | Scottish Premiership | 11 | 0 | 1 | 0 | 1 | 0 | — | | 13 | 0 |
| Inverness Caledonian Thistle | 2015–16 | Scottish Premiership | 32 | 2 | 3 | 0 | 2 | 0 | 0 | 0 | 37 | 2 |
| Inverness Caledonian Thistle | 2016–17 | Scottish Premiership | 29 | 4 | 2 | 0 | 5 | 3 | — | | 36 | 7 |
| Inverness Caledonian Thistle | 2017–18 | Scottish Championship | 25 | 1 | 0 | 0 | 0 | 0 | 4 (Note: Appearances in the Scottish Challenge Cup) | 2 | 29 | 3 |
| Inverness Caledonian Thistle | 2018–19 | Scottish Championship | 22 | 2 | 5 | 0 | 4 | 0 | 0 | 0 | 31 | 2 |
| Inverness Caledonian Thistle | 2019–20 | Scottish Championship | 21 | 1 | 2 | 0 | 4 | 0 | 2 | 0 | 29 | 1 |
| Inverness Caledonian Thistle | Inverness Total | | 161 | 10 | 14 | 0 | 18 | 3 | 6 | 2 | 199 | 15 |
| Ross County | 2020–21 | Scottish Premiership | 12 | 0 | 0 | 0 | 3 | 0 | — | | 15 | 0 |
| Career total | | | 365 | 12 | 23 | 2 | 25 | 3 | 12 | 2 | 425 | 19 |
