= Ben Tomlinson =

English footballer (born 1989)

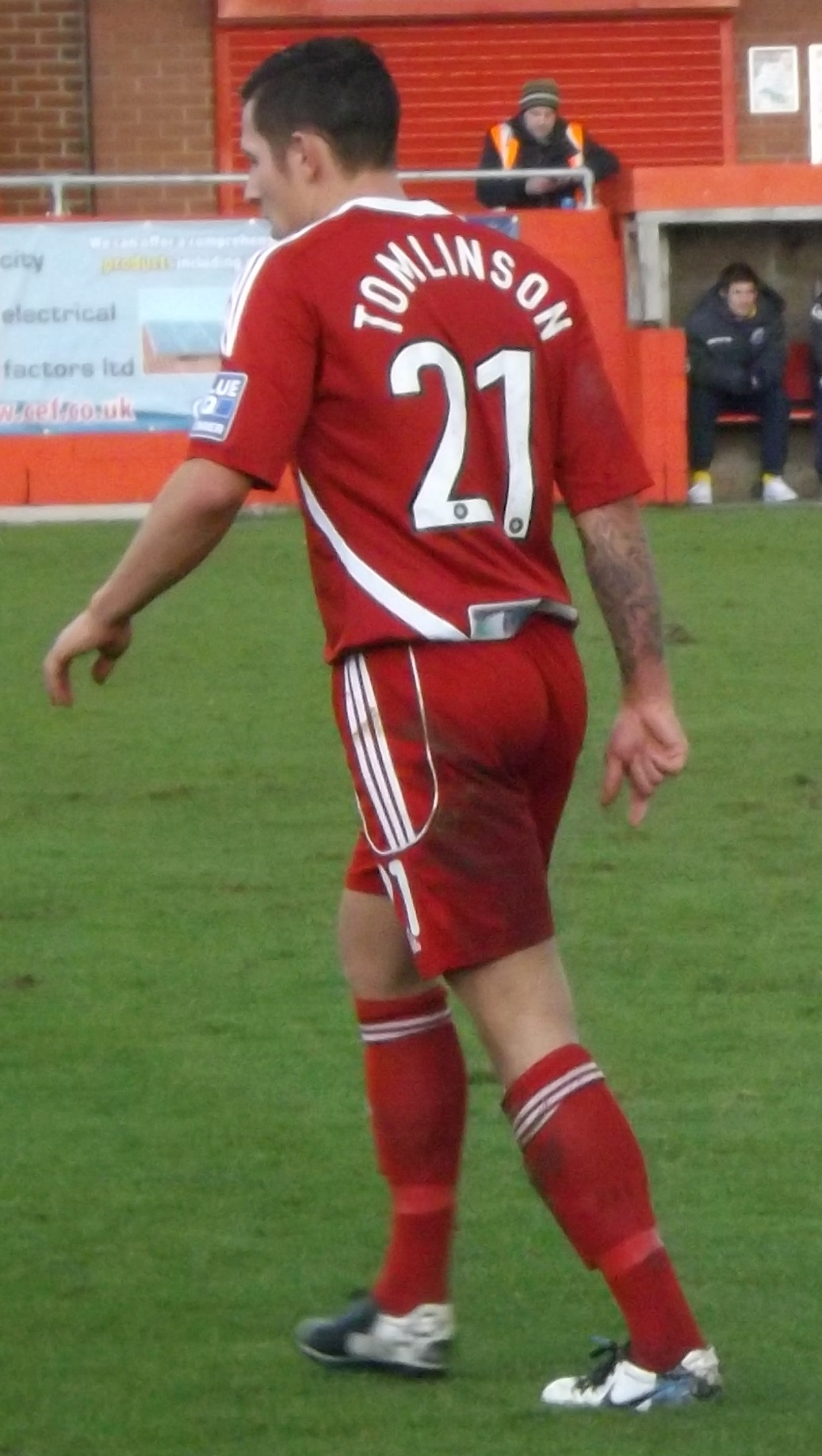
- Tomlinson playing for Alfreton Town in 2013

Personal information
- Full name: Ben Tomlinson
- Date of birth: 31 October 1989 (age 37)
- Place of birth: Dinnington, England
- Height: 1.80 m (5 ft 11 in)
- Position: Forward

Team information
- Current team: Worksop Town

Youth career
- –2008: Worksop Town

Senior career*
Years	Team	Apps	(Gls)
2008–2011	Worksop Town		
2011–2012	Macclesfield Town	25	(6)
2012–2013	Alfreton Town	39	(11)
2013–2015	Lincoln City	85	(32)
2015–2017	Barnet	6	(0)
2015	→ Grimsby Town (loan)	7	(0)
2015–2016	→ Tranmere Rovers (loan)	10	(0)
2016	→ Barrow (loan)	14	(4)
2017	Carlisle United	2	(0)
2017–2019	FC Halifax Town	52	(4)
2019–2020	Alfreton Town	21	(2)
2020	→ Frickley Athletic (loan)	4	(1)
2020–	Worksop Town	36	(2)
- * Club domestic league appearances and goals as of 20:52, 14 August 2024 (UTC)

Ben Tomlinson (born 31 October 1989) is an English professional footballer who plays as a striker for Worksop Town

== Career ==
Tomlinson was born in Dinnington, South Yorkshire. He came through the youth setup of Nottinghamshire-based club Worksop Town, and originally played for the under-19s before making it into the first team for the Tigers. He signed for Football League Two side Macclesfield Town on 29 June 2011 for an undisclosed five figure sum. He made his professional debut on 6 August 2011, in the opening day defeat to Dagenham & Redbridge at Moss Rose. Tomlinson scored his first league goals at Hereford United, scoring twice in the last five minutes after coming on as a late substitute. On 13 September he scored o–ne of the fastest goals in Football League history, scoring in just 6.4 seconds straight from kick off against then League Two leaders Morecambe.

On 8 August 2012 Tomlinson joined Conference Premier side Alfreton Town on a two-year contract for an undisclosed fee. In July 2013, less than a year after moving to Alfreton, he joined fellow Conference side Lincoln City on a two-year contract for an undisclosed four-figure fee.

After two years at Lincoln, Tomlinson joined Barnet in May 2015, on a two-year deal.

On 17 September 2015, Tomlinson joined National League side Grimsby Town on a one-month loan. After seven appearances, he returned to Barnet and then joined Tranmere Rovers on loan on 29 October 2015. Tomlinson left Barnet by mutual consent on 31 January 2017, having made only 12 appearances in one-and-a-half seasons at the club.

Tomlinson joined Carlisle United on a non-contract basis in March 2017. He then signed for FC Halifax Town on a one-year deal on 18 July 2017. He signed a new one-year contract with Halifax in June 2018. He went on to play 56 games in all competitions for the Shaymen, scoring four goals.

Tomlinson re-joined Alfreton for the 2019–20 season.

In October 2020, Tomlinson joined Frickley Athletic on loan to cover for injuries to their forwards.

On 17 November 2020, he returned to Northern Premier League Division One east side Worksop Town after nine years away.

== Career statistics ==
As of match played 8 January 2022

Appearances and goals by club, season and competition
Club	Season	League			FA Cup		League Cup		Other		Total	
Club	Season	Division	Apps	Goals	Apps	Goals	Apps	Goals	Apps	Goals	Apps	Goals
Macclesfield Town	2011–12	League Two	25	6	0	0	1	0	1 (Note: Appearance in the Football League Trophy)	0	27	6
Alfreton Town	2012–13	Conference Premier	39	11	3	4	—		4 (Note: One appearance in the FA Trophy, three appearances and one goal in the Derbyshire Senior Cup)	1	46	16
Lincoln City	2013–14	Conference Premier	39	18	4	2	—		1 (Note: Appearance in the FA Trophy)	0	44	20
Lincoln City	2014–15	Conference Premier	46	14	2	0	—		1	0	49	14
Lincoln City	Total		85	32	6	2	—		2	0	93	34
Barnet	2015–16	League Two	3	0	0	0	1	0	1	0	5	0
Barnet	2016–17	League Two	3	0	1	0	0	0	3	0	7	0
Barnet	Total		6	0	1	0	1	0	4	0	12	0
Grimsby Town (loan)	2015–16	National League	7	0	0	0	—		0	0	7	0
Tranmere Rovers (loan)	2015–16	National League	10	0	0	0	—		1	0	11	0
Barrow (loan)	2015–16	National League	14	4	0	0	—		0	0	14	4
Carlisle United	2016–17	League Two	2	0	0	0	0	0	0	0	2	0
FC Halifax Town	2017–18	National League	34	3	1	0	—		2	0	37	3
FC Halifax Town	2018–19	National League	18	1	0	0	—		1	0	19	1
FC Halifax Town	Total		52	4	1	0	—		3	0	56	4
Alfreton Town	2019–20	National League North	21	2	0	0	—		0	0	21	2
Frickley Athletic	2020–21	NPL Division One South East	4	1	0	0	—		1	0	5	1
Worksop Town	2021–22	NPL Division One East	17	0	4	1	—		3 (Note: One appearance and one goal in the FA Trophy, two appearances and one goal in Sheffield & Hallam Senior Cup)	2	24	3
Career total			282	60	15	7	2	0	17	3	318	70
