= Dan Gray (footballer) =

English footballer

Personal information
- Full name: Daniel Edward Gray
- Date of birth: 23 November 1989 (age 36)
- Place of birth: Mansfield, England
- Height: 6 ft 0 in (1.83 m)
- Positions: Right back; midfielder

Team information
- Current team: Alfreton Town
- Number: 16

Senior career*
Years	Team	Apps	(Gls)
2008–2012	Chesterfield	45	(0)
2008	→ Alfreton Town (loan)		
2011	→ Macclesfield Town (loan)	21	(1)
2011	→ Macclesfield Town (loan)	2	(0)
2012–2014	Lincoln City	52	(1)
2014–	Alfreton Town	7	(0)
2015	→ Bradford Park Avenue (loan)	1	(0)
- * Club domestic league appearances and goals as of 18:17, 20 February 2015 (UTC)

Daniel Edward Gray (born 23 November 1989) is an English semi-professional footballer who plays for Alfreton Town. Gray began his career as a central midfielder, before being converted into a right back, where he has spent most of his first-team career.

== Career ==
Born in Mansfield, Nottinghamshire, Gray made his debut for Chesterfield in October 2008, having earlier spent a work experience placement at non-league Alfreton Town in March 2008.

On 31 December 2010, it was announced that Gray would sign a one-month loan contract with Macclesfield Town, effective from 1 January 2011.

Gray made his debut for the club on 1 January 2011, scoring in a 2–2 draw against Bury.

Gray re-joined Macclesfield on loan in November 2011.

He was released by Chesterfield at the end of the 2011–12 season.

Gray signed for Lincoln City on 24 July 2012 after a successful trial period at the club.

He joined Conference Premier team Alfreton Town on a one-year contract on 15 July 2014.

On 9 January 2015, he completed a loan move to Bradford Park Avenue.

== Career statistics ==
As of 20 February 2015

Club	Season	League		FA Cup		League Cup		Other		Total	
Club	Season	Apps	Goals	Apps	Goals	Apps	Goals	Apps	Goals	Apps	Goals
Chesterfield	2008–09	24	0	3	0	0	0	0	0	27	0
Chesterfield	2009–10	19	0	0	0	1	0	3	0	23	0
Chesterfield	2010–11	2	0	1	0	0	0	0	0	3	0
Chesterfield	2011–12	0	0	0	0	0	0	0	0	0	0
Chesterfield	Total	45	0	4	0	1	0	3	0	53	0
Macclesfield Town (loan)	2010–11	21	1	0	0	0	0	0	0	21	1
Macclesfield Town (loan)	2011–12	2	0	0	0	0	0	0	0	2	0
Macclesfield Town (loan)	Total	23	1	0	0	0	0	0	0	23	1
Lincoln City	2012–13	35	1	4	0	0	0	0	0	39	1
Lincoln City	2013–14	17	0	0	0	0	0	1	0	18	0
Lincoln City	Total	52	1	4	0	0	0	1	0	57	1
Alfreton Town	2014–15	7	0	0	0	—		0	0	7	0
Bradford Park Avenue (loan)	2014–15	1	0	0	0	—		0	0	1	0
Career total		128	2	8	0	1	0	4	0	141	2
