= Tony Diagne =

French footballer (born 1990)

Personal information
- Full name: Anthony Diagne
- Date of birth: 7 September 1990 (age 36)
- Place of birth: Aubergenville, France
- Position: Defender

Youth career
- 2007–2010: Nottingham Forest

Senior career*
Years	Team	Apps	(Gls)
2010–2011	Aubervilliers	0	(0)
2011–2013	Macclesfield Town	77	(4)
2013	→ Lincoln City (loan)	7	(2)
2013–2014	Morecambe	27	(2)
2014–2016	Lincoln City	18	(0)
2015–2016	→ Macclesfield Town (loan)	32	(2)
2016–2017	Hemel Hempstead Town	33	(2)
2017–2018	Barrow	17	(0)
2018–2019	A.C.B.B	18	(1)
- * Club domestic league appearances and goals as of 00:14, 6 July 2020 (UTC)

Anthony Diagne (born 7 September 1990) is a French footballer who plays as a defender.

== Career ==
Born in Aubergenville, Yvelines, Diagne started his career playing in the youth teams at Nottingham Forest. On 2 June 2010 he was released by Forest and went back to France to play for his local side Aubervilliers in the Championnat de France amateur.

He stayed there for half a year until in January 2011 he was signed by Football League Two side Macclesfield Town. He made his debut for Macclesfield on 1 February 2011 in a 4–2 defeat to Bury, coming on as a second-half substitute. He scored his first goal just eight days later in a 2–2 draw with Hereford United. Diagne initially signed a contract to the end of the 2010–11 season but after a series of good performances in defence that contract was extended to the end of the 2011–12 season.

After impressing in a relegation threatened side, in April 2012, Diagne was linked with a move to Leeds United and Blackburn Rovers at the end of the season.

At the end of August 2012 Diagne was due to sign for League One club Bury on loan with a view to making the move permanent in January. But the deal fell through and he stayed with Macclesfield. On 3 November 2012, Diagne scored a long range free kick from around 40 yards out against Swindon Town in the FA Cup where Macclesfield Town famously defeated Paulo Di Canio's Swindon Town side 2–0 at the County Ground.

It was announced on 2 March 2013 that Diagne was rejoining former Macclesfield manager Gary Simpson at Lincoln City on loan, he joined the imps till the end of the season accompanied by former Imp and then Macclesfield captain Nat Brown. Despite borrowing two of the Silkmen's defenders Lincoln conceded within two minutes of their Conference National match against Woking, which took place on the same day as Diagne signed for Lincoln, the match finished 1–1. The next match for Diagne's Lincoln was away at Macclesfield on the following Wednesday, as a part of the loan deal Diagne and Brown were not eligible to play in the match.

At the end of the season Diagne left Macclesfield and joined nearby Football League side Morecambe on a two-year contract. Manager Jim Bentley was impressed with Diagne's ability to adapt to different positions.

On 6 May 2014 it was announced that Diagne had been put on the transfer list at the Globe Arena.

== Career statistics ==
As of 4 March 2013

Appearances and goals by club, season and competition
Club	Season	League^{[A]}		FA Cup		League Cup		Other^{[B]}		Total	
Club	Season	Apps	Goals	Apps	Goals	Apps	Goals	Apps	Goals	Apps	Goals
Macclesfield Town	2010–11	20	1	0	0	0	0	0	0	20	1
Macclesfield Town	2011–12	41	3	4	1	2	0	1	0	48	4
Macclesfield Town	2012–13	16	0	1	1	0	0	1	0	18	1
Macclesfield Town	Total	77	4	5	2	2	0	2	0	86	6
Lincoln City (loan)	2012–13	1	0	0	0	0	0	0	0	1	0
Lincoln City	2014–15	18	0	0	0	0	0	0	0	18	0
Career totals		96	4	5	2	2	0	2	0	105	6

== Footnotes ==
A. The "Other" column constitutes appearances and goals (including those as a substitute) in the Football League and Football Conference.
B. The "Other" column constitutes appearances and goals (including those as a substitute) in the Football League Trophy.
