= Scott Kay =

English footballer

Personal information
- Full name: Scott John David Kay
- Date of birth: 18 September 1989 (age 37)
- Place of birth: Denton, England
- Height: 5 ft 10 1/2 in (1.79 m)
- Position: Midfielder

Youth career
- 2003–2009: Manchester City

Senior career*
| Years | Team | Apps | (Gls) |
| 2009–2011 | Manchester City | 0 | (0) |
| 2011–2012 | Macclesfield Town | 15 | (0) |
| 2012–2013 | Huddersfield Town | 0 | (0) |
| 2013 | → Southport (loan) | 16 | (0) |
| 2013–2014 | Macclesfield Town | 27 | (0) |
| 2014–2015 | Southport | 27 | (1) |
| 2015 | Mossley | | |
| 2015–2018 | FC United of Manchester | 103 | (2) |
| 2018–2019 | Ashton United | 25 | (0) |
| 2019–2020 | Glossop North End | 15 | (0) |
| 2023–2024 | Trafford | 13 | (1) |
- * Club domestic league appearances and goals as of 22:08, 3 February 2025 (UTC)

Scott John David Kay (born 18 September 1989) is an English semi-professional footballer.

== Career ==
Kay, a lifelong Manchester City fan, started career coming through the Manchester City youth system, failing to make an appearance for the first team.

=== Macclesfield Town ===
He signed for Football League Two side Macclesfield Town on 25 June 2011 on a free transfer after being released by City. He made his professional debut on 6 August 2011, in the opening day defeat to Dagenham & Redbridge at Moss Rose. In May 2012, Kay was released by Macclesfield due to the expiry of his contract.

=== Huddersfield Town ===
After impressing trial over the summer catching the eye of Huddersfield Development Squad coach Steve Eyre who he had worked with at Manchester City, Kay was offered a short-term deal with the club to play in the Development Squad for the 2012–13 season.

=== Southport ===
Kay joined Southport in January 2013 and went on to make 16 appearances for the club in the second half of the 2012–13 season.

=== Return to Macclesfield Town ===
On 8 August 2013, Scott re signed for Macclesfield Town after having been on trial with the club in pre-season.

=== Return to Southport ===
Scott returned to Southport on the 18 June 2014 ahead of the 2014–15 season, after his contract at Macclesfield Town expired.

=== FC United of Manchester ===
He played three seasons for the club leaving in 2018.

=== Ashton United ===
In October 2018 he joined Ashton United.

=== Trafford ===
In October 2023, Kay returned to the pitch, signing with Trafford FC.
