= Ben Mills (footballer) =

English footballer (born 1989)

Personal information
- Date of birth: 23 March 1989 (age 37)
- Place of birth: Stoke-on-Trent, England
- Height: 6 ft 2 in (1.88 m)
- Position: Forward

Team information
- Current team: Whitchurch Alport

Youth career
- Port Vale
- ?–2007: Leek Town

Senior career*
Years	Team	Apps	(Gls)
2007–2008	Newcastle Town	32	(9)
2008	→ Leek Town (loan)	4	(1)
2008–2009	Leek Town	33	(12)
2009	Stafford Rangers	15	(6)
2009–2010	Alfreton Town	13	(1)
2010–2011	Stafford Rangers	33	(6)
2011–2012	Nantwich Town	25	(11)
2012	Macclesfield Town	13	(0)
2012	→ Chester (loan)	8	(9)
2012–2013	Chester	24	(4)
2013	→ Altrincham (loan)	4	(1)
2013–2014	Brackley Town	19	(3)
2014	Leek Town	9	(5)
2014	Newcastle Town	8	(1)
2015	Witton Albion	7	(2)
2015–	Newcastle Town	5	(2)
2017–	Whitchurch Alport		
- * Club domestic league appearances and goals as of 17:00, 18 July 2019 (UTC)

Ben Mills (born 23 March 1989) is an English professional footballer who plays as a forward for Whitchurch Alport.

== Career ==
Mills was a trainee at Port Vale and was also at Leek Town as a youth player.

He joined Newcastle Town in July 2007, turning down a deal with Leek and in September 2008 joined former club Leek, initially on loan. However, the decision by Newcastle to take Mills off contract to enable him to play for Leek backfired on the club, after the player decided to remain with Leek and sign with them.

In March 2009 he turned down moves to Stafford Rangers and to Tamworth and Hednesford Town. opting to remain with Leek for the remainder of the season. In July did sign for Stafford, with an opportunity to play at two steps higher in the football pyramid.

He then spent time with Alfreton Town before returning for a second spell at Stafford Rangers.

In the 2011/12 season he played for Nantwich Town, including featuring for the club in their 6–0 defeat by MK Dons in the FA Cup in November 2011.

He moved to Macclesfield Town in January 2012 and made his Football League debut on 14 January in a League Two game against Torquay.

In August 2012 he joined Chester on loan, scoring nine goals in the seven appearances he made for the club during his loan spell, including a hat-trick in a 4–0 victory over Guiseley. Whilst Mills was keen to join Chester if the right deal could be made Macclesfield initially rejected Chester's offer but then indicated they would be willing to accept their bid, however Chester manager Neil Young chose not to continue negotiations due to a tight transfer budget.

After his return from loan he made his first appearance for Macclesfield in the Conference National in October 2012. In November 2012, with a lack of first team football, Mills transferred back to Chester on a permanent basis, despite being reluctant on a move to part-time football 2 months earlier. The move was funded by donations from Chester fans.

Struggling with injuries and form he was loaned to Altrincham, scoring once in four games. He sustained an injury which ended his season. He returned to Chester for the start of the next season but only managed to score once within eleven appearances and left the club in October 2013.

After spells with Brackley Town, Leek Town and Newcastle Town he signed for Witton Albion in August 2015.
