= Hamza Bencherif =

French-Algerian footballer (born 1988)

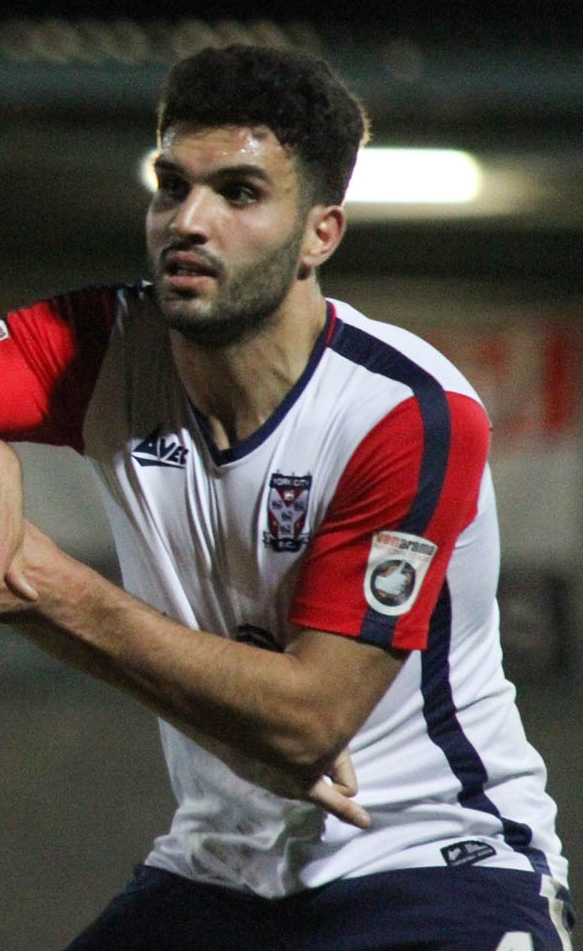
- Bencherif playing for York City in 2018

Personal information
- Full name: Hamza Bencherif
- Date of birth: 9 February 1988 (age 38)
- Place of birth: Paris, France
- Height: 1.91 m (6 ft 3 in)
- Positions: Defender; midfielder

Team information
- Current team: Worksop Town

Youth career
- –2006: Guingamp
- 2006–2007: Nottingham Forest

Senior career*
Years	Team	Apps	(Gls)
2007–2009	Nottingham Forest	0	(0)
2007	→ Lincoln City (loan)	12	(1)
2009–2011	Macclesfield Town	60	(16)
2011–2013	Notts County	31	(2)
2013–2014	Plymouth Argyle	7	(0)
2014	JS Kabylie	6	(0)
2014–2015	Lincoln City	41	(6)
2015–2016	FC Halifax Town	41	(0)
2016–2017	Wrexham	27	(2)
2017	→ York City (loan)	17	(0)
2017–2019	York City	64	(3)
2019–2022	Guiseley	46	(5)
2022–2026	Worksop Town	88	(9)
2026	Mickleover F.C.	-	(-)

International career
2005–2006	Algeria U20	7	(1)
- * Club domestic league appearances and goals as of 17:30, 25 November 2024 (UTC)

Hamza Bencherif (Arabic: حمزة بن شريف; born 9 February 1988) is a professional footballer who plays as a defender or midfielder for Mickleover F.C. where he is club captain. Born in Paris, he has played in the Football League for several clubs and represented Algeria at youth international level.

== Club career ==
Bencherif was born in Paris and started his career with Guingamp before joining Nottingham Forest's youth system in August 2006. He joined League Two club Lincoln City on 2 October 2007 on a one-month loan, which was extended for a second month. He made 12 appearances and scored 1 goal against Chesterfield. He was released by Forest at the end of the 2008–09 season and signed a one-year contract with League Two club Macclesfield Town on 6 July 2009. He became a first-team regular in the first half of the season at Moss Rose, but a broken ankle he sustained in December 2009 ended his season. Bencherif signed a one-year extension to his contract in May 2010, and scored 11 goals in 46 appearances in 2010–11.

He rejected a new contract offer from Macclesfield to sign a two-year contract with League One club Notts County on 23 June 2011. He was released when his contract expired in the summer of 2013. Bencherif signed a short-term contract with League Two club Plymouth Argyle in September 2013, and scored on his debut the next day against Cheltenham Town. He was released in January 2014, having made nine appearances for the club, before signing for Algerian Ligue Professionnelle 1 club JS Kabylie on a one-and-a-half-year contract.

Bencherif joined Conference Premier club Lincoln City on 1 August 2014 on a one-year contract. After one season with Lincoln, he turned down a new contract to join National League club FC Halifax Town. He started as F.C. Halifax beat Grimsby Town 1–0 on 22 May 2016 at Wembley Stadium in the 2016 FA Trophy Final.

Bencherif signed for National League club Wrexham on 24 May 2016 on a one-year contract. On 17 January 2017, Bencherif joined Wrexham's National League rivals York City on loan until the end of 2016–17. On 21 May 2017, he started as York beat Macclesfield Town 3–2 at Wembley Stadium in the 2017 FA Trophy Final. Bencherif signed for York permanently on 16 June 2017 on a one-year contract. He was released at the end of the 2018–19 season.

Bencherif signed for National League North club Guiseley on 24 June 2019. On 9 January 2021 he was appointed Club Captain.

On 9 June 2022, Bencherif signed for Northern Premier League club Worksop Town.

In 2026 Hamza left Worksop Town and signed for Mickleover F.C.

== International career ==
Bencherif made seven appearances, scoring one goal, for the Algeria national under-20 team from 2005 to 2006. A call-up to the senior team was talked about in 2009 due to his form at Macclesfield Town before a broken ankle ended his season.

== Career statistics ==
As of 24 June 2019

Appearances and goals by club, season and competition
Club	Season	League			National Cup (Note: Includes FA Cup, Algerian Cup)		League Cup		Other		Total	
Club	Season	Division	Apps	Goals	Apps	Goals	Apps	Goals	Apps	Goals	Apps	Goals
Nottingham Forest	2006–07	League One	0	0	0	0	0	0	0	0	0	0
Nottingham Forest	2007–08	League One	0	0	—		0	0	0	0	0	0
Nottingham Forest	2008–09	Championship	0	0	0	0	0	0	—		0	0
Nottingham Forest	Total		0	0	0	0	0	0	0	0	0	0
Lincoln City (loan)	2007–08	League Two	12	1	—		—		1 (Note: Appearance(s) in Football League Trophy)	0	13	1
Macclesfield Town	2009–10	League Two	19	5	1	0	1	0	1	0	22	5
Macclesfield Town	2010–11	League Two	41	11	2	0	1	0	2	0	46	11
Macclesfield Town	Total		60	16	3	0	2	0	3	0	68	16
Notts County	2011–12	League One	20	2	3	0	1	0	1	0	25	2
Notts County	2012–13	League One	11	0	1	0	1	0	2	0	15	0
Notts County	Total		31	2	4	0	2	0	3	0	40	2
Plymouth Argyle	2013–14	League Two	7	0	0	0	0	0	2	1	9	1
JS Kabylie	2013–14	Algerian Ligue Professionnelle 1	6	0	1	0	—		—		7	0
Lincoln City	2014–15	Conference Premier	41	6	2	0	—		1 (Note: Appearance(s) in FA Trophy)	0	44	6
FC Halifax Town	2015–16	National League	41	0	1	0	—		8	0	50	0
Wrexham	2016–17	National League	27	2	2	0	—		0	0	29	2
York City (loan)	2016–17	National League	17	0	—		—		5	0	22	0
York City	2017–18	National League North	40	0	2	0	—		2	0	44	0
York City	2018–19	National League North	24	3	2	0	—		0	0	26	3
York City	Total		81	3	4	0	—		7	0	92	3
Guiseley	2019–20	National League North	0	0	0	0	—		0	0	0	0
Career total			306	30	17	0	4	0	25	1	352	31

== Honours ==
FC Halifax Town

- FA Trophy: 2015–16

York City

- FA Trophy: 2016–17
