= Michael Thomas (footballer, born 1992) =

English footballer

Personal information
- Full name: Michael David Thomas
- Date of birth: 12 August 1992 (age 34)
- Place of birth: Manchester, England
- Position: Midfielder

Team information
- Current team: Leek Town
- Number: 25

Youth career
- –2009: Macclesfield Town

Senior career*
Years	Team	Apps	(Gls)
2009–2012	Macclesfield Town	10	(0)
2010–2011	→ Mossley (loan)	28	(2)
2011	→ Leek Town (loan)	?	(?)
2012	Colwyn Bay	?	(?)
2012–	Leek Town	?	(?)
- * Club domestic league appearances and goals as of 15:14, 22 May 2012 (UTC)

Michael David Thomas (born 12 August 1992) is a professional English footballer who plays as a midfielder for Leek Town.

== Career ==
Thomas made his debut on 29 September 2009 for Macclesfield Town in their 1–1 away draw with Burton Albion in League Two, replacing Paul Morgan in the 81st minute as a substitute.

On 29 October 2010 he joined Mossley on loan, and joined Leek Town on the eve 2011/12 season. In May 2012, Thomas was released by Macclesfield due to the expiry of his contract.

He joined Colwyn Bay in the summer of 2012, but after struggling to hold down a place in the first team, he moved back to Leek Town in October 2012.
