= George Donnelly (footballer) =

English footballer (born 1988)

Personal information
- Full name: George John Donnelly
- Date of birth: 28 May 1988 (age 38)
- Place of birth: Kirkby, Merseyside, England
- Height: 6 ft 2 in (1.88 m)
- Position: Striker

Youth career
- 2004–2007: Liverpool

Senior career*
Years	Team	Apps	(Gls)
2007	Runcorn Town	9	(11)
2007–2009	Skelmersdale United	47	(36)
2009–2011	Plymouth Argyle	2	(0)
2009	→ Luton Town (loan)	4	(0)
2009–2010	→ Stockport County (loan)	19	(4)
2010–2011	→ Stockport County (loan)	23	(8)
2011–2012	Fleetwood Town	25	(5)
2011	→ Macclesfield Town (loan)	13	(3)
2012	Macclesfield Town	15	(3)
2012–2014	Rochdale	78	(13)
2014–2015	Tranmere Rovers	11	(0)
2015	→ Southport (loan)	16	(1)
2015–?	Skelmersdale United		
2016	AFC Liverpool	9	(3)
2018	Marine	5	(0)

International career
2011	England C	1	(0)
- * Club domestic league appearances and goals as of 27 May 2018

George John Donnelly (born 28 May 1988) is an English professional footballer who plays as a striker.

He has previously played for Skelmersdale United, Plymouth Argyle, Luton Town, Stockport County, Fleetwood Town, Macclesfield Town and Tranmere Rovers.

Donnelly has played internationally for England at non-league level.

== Club career ==
=== Early career ===
As a youth player, Donnelly played for Liverpool. He started his career with Runcorn Town and Northern Premier League Division One North club Skelmersdale United, becoming a prolific goalscorer.

=== Plymouth Argyle ===
In March 2009 he joined Championship side Plymouth Argyle. Donnelly also had offers from Conference North clubs Southport and Fleetwood Town and Football League side Scunthorpe United. Donnelly made his debut for Plymouth on 18 April 2009 as a substitute in a 3–0 defeat at home against Doncaster Rovers in the Championship.

==== Luton Town loan ====
On 28 August 2009, Donnelly signed on a one-month loan for Conference Premier club Luton Town, where he made four substitute appearances.

==== Stockport County loans ====
He moved on loan to Stockport County on 29 January 2010, signing initially for one month. He made his debut for the club as second-half substitute on 30 January in a match against Southampton. His loan was later extended until the end of the season but he missed the last game of the season as his parent club Plymouth withdrew his loan. He scored 4 goals in the 19 games he played for the club.

In July 2010 he rejoined Stockport on loan for a further six months in a spell which saw him score 8 goals in 27 matches.

=== Fleetwood Town ===
On 6 January 2011 he moved to Fleetwood Town for a club record fee, believed to be in the region of £50,000. He made his debut for the club on 8 January.

In August 2011, George was the subject of speculation of an unusual bid from his former loan club Stockport County. Through the social networking site Twitter, County asked their fans who they would like to sign between Donnelly and Halifax Town forward Jamie Vardy. County director Tony Evans entered into negotiations with Fleetwood but valuations between the two clubs were irreparably different.

==== Macclesfield Town loans ====
Despite the Twitter interest, George signed for League Two club Macclesfield Town on an initial one-month loan on 9 September 2011.

=== Macclesfield Town ===
On 1 January 2012 he signed a two-and-a-half-year deal with Macclesfield Town after his loan period ended for an undisclosed five-figure sum.

=== Rochdale ===
On 15 May 2012 it was announced that Donnelly had signed for Rochdale for an undisclosed fee on a two-year deal. He made his debut on 11 August in a 4–3 defeat against Barnsley in the League Cup. He scored his first goal for the club on 6 October in a 3–2 win against Accrington Stanley. He scored his second goal on 13 October in a 2–1 defeat at home to Morecambe.

=== Tranmere Rovers ===
On 1 September 2014, George joined Tranmere Rovers on a two-year deal for an undisclosed fee from Rochdale.

In January 2015, manager Micky Adams announced that Donnelly was available for transfer, and he joined Southport on loan until the end of the season on 30 January.

Donnelly's contract was cancelled by mutual consent in July 2015.

=== AFC Liverpool ===
In August 2016 he joined AFC Liverpool.

=== Marine ===
In March 2018 he signed for Marine.

== Personal life ==
Before turning professional as a footballer, Donnelly worked in a warehouse.

He is also a personal trainer.
