= Lewis Chalmers =

English footballer

Personal information
- Full name: Lewis John Chalmers
- Date of birth: 4 February 1986 (age 40)
- Place of birth: Manchester, England
- Height: 6 ft 0 in (1.83 m)
- Position: Midfielder

Youth career
- Fletcher Moss Rangers
- Manchester City
- Accrington Stanley

Senior career*
Years	Team	Apps	(Gls)
2004–2007	Altrincham	73	(6)
2007–2010	Aldershot Town	88	(4)
2009	→ Crawley Town (loan)	4	(0)
2010	→ Oxford United (loan)	8	(0)
2010–2012	Macclesfield Town	53	(5)
2012	Radcliffe Borough		
2012–2013	FC United of Manchester		
2013	Droylsden		
2013	Nantwich Town		
2014	New Mills		
2014–15	Northwich Villa		
2015	Trafford		

International career
2006–2008	England C	10	(0)
- * Club domestic league appearances and goals as of 17:54, 11 May 2012 (UTC)

Lewis John Chalmers (born 4 February 1986) is an English professional footballer who plays as a midfielder.

Having started playing football at Fletcher Moss Rangers, he moved to Altrincham he then moved on to Aldershot Town where he made several loan appearances for Crawley Town and Oxford United before joining Macclesfield Town on a free transfer in 2009. He has since played for a series of non league clubs including Radcliffe Borough and FC United of Manchester.

== Career ==
=== Altrincham ===
Chalmers played youth team football at Manchester City and Accrington Stanley before joining Altrincham during the 2002–03 season. He played regularly in Altrincham's reserves and signed a full contract in November 2004 before making his debut in March 2005.

=== Aldershot Town ===
In June 2007, Chalmers joined Aldershot Town. He was an important part of the squad that won the Conference National title and the Conference League Cup. He was also one of five Aldershot Town players that were named in the Conference Select XI Team of the Year.

In the summer of 2008, Chalmers signed a new two-year deal to remain at Aldershot Town. He made his Football League debut by coming on as a substitute in the opening League Two game of 2008–09 season at Accrington Stanley. In January 2009, Chalmers was loaned out for one-month to Crawley Town. The loan was later extended for a second month. Chalmers was then recalled early from his loan spell at the Broadfield Stadium, due to an injury crisis back at Aldershot Town. Chalmers scored his first-ever Football League goal against Barnet in April 2009.

Chalmers moved on loan to Conference championship chasing Oxford United on 5 March 2010 for the rest of the season, joining fellow Shots player John Grant who made the same move a week earlier. He made his debut a day later coming on for Chris Hargreaves in the 2–1 home defeat to Hayes & Yeading.

=== Macclesfield Town ===
Chalmers was released by Aldershot at the end of the 2009–10 season and subsequently signed for Macclesfield Town in June 2010, initially on a one-year contract. He left Macclesfield at the end of the 2011–12 season after making 53 league appearances, scoring 5 goals.

In July 2012 he joined Conference National side Grimsby Town on trial, and played in the club's 12–3 victory over Grimsby Borough on 11 July 2012, however two days later it was announced that he would not be offered a contract.

=== Move into Non-league ===
In October 2012 he joined Radcliffe Borough. He then moved to FC United of Manchester in mid November. In January 2013 he moved to Droylsden.

== International career ==
Chalmers won his first England National Game XI cap against Holland in November 2006. He was also involved in the winning of the 2005–07 European Challenge Trophy and the Four Nations Tournament in 2007. He was also part of the England C squad that won the Four Nations Tournament in May 2008.

== Honours ==
Aldershot Town

- Conference National (V): 2008
- Conference League Cup: 2008

England C

- Four Nations Tournament: 2008
