= Vinny Mukendi =

English-born Congolese footballer

Personal information
- Full name: Vinny Mukendi
- Date of birth: 12 March 1992 (age 34)
- Place of birth: Manchester, England
- Height: 6 ft 6 in (1.98 m)
- Position: Striker

Youth career
- 2006–2009: Macclesfield Town

Senior career*
Years	Team	Apps	(Gls)
2009–2012	Macclesfield Town	47	(3)
2011	→ Southport (loan)	8	(2)
2012	→ Southport (loan)	5	(1)
2012	Barrow	4	(0)
2012	→ Tamworth (loan)	1	(0)
2012	Droylsden	3	(0)
2012	Stalybridge Celtic	3	(0)
2013	Salford City		
2013	Goole	4	(1)
2014	Southport	14	(1)
2014	Colwyn Bay (trialist)	3	(0)
2014	Nantwich Town		
2015	Gap Connah's Quay	0	(0)
2015	Radcliffe Borough		
2015	Ramsbottom United	7	(1)
2015–2016	Oxford City	7	(3)
2016	North Ferriby United	14	(0)
2016–2017	Hednesford Town	10	(4)
2017	Nantwich Town		
2017–2018	Redditch United	4	(2)
2020–2021	Atherton LR		
2021	Pennington		
2021–2022	Sheffield		
2022–2023	AFC Mansfield		

International career
2011	DR Congo U19	2	(0)
- * Club domestic league appearances and goals as of 12:46, 24 January 2017 (UTC)

Vinny Mukendi (born 12 March 1992) is an English-born Congolese footballer who plays as a striker. During his career played for 20 clubs including Macclesfield Town, Barrow, Droylsden, Stalybridge Celtic, Salford City, Southport, Oxford City, North Ferriby United, Nantwich Town and Redditch United, and on loan spells at Southport and Tamworth.

== Club career ==
=== Macclesfield Town ===
Born in Manchester, Greater Manchester, Mukendi started at Macclesfield Town in 2008, joining their youth academy on a two-year scholarship. He impressed enough to be given a squad number while still 16 and made his league debut on the final day of the 2008–09 season in a 0–0 draw against Grimsby Town. His first goal for the club came on 16 April 2010 when his team beat Chesterfield.

==== Southport (loans) ====
Mukendi joined Conference National side Southport on a one-month loan deal on 23 September 2011. He made his debut for the club a day later, coming on as a 68th-minute substitute in a 4–0 home defeat against Braintree Town.

Mukendi's first goal on loan at Southport was a second half equaliser in a 1–1 draw at home to York City on 11 October 2011. He subsequently received a yellow card for his celebration.

Mukendi was recalled to Macclesfield on 26 October 2011 following a selection crisis among the club's strikers. He re-joined Southport again on 19 January 2012 for an initial month's loan but was again recalled when Macclesfield suffered another selection problem. In May 2012, Mukendi was released by Macclesfield due to the expiry of his contract.

=== Barrow ===
On 10 August 2012, Mukendi signed for Barrow. He made his debut for the club in the 0–0 draw with AFC Telford United the following day and went on to make four appearances for the Cumbrian side, three of them as a substitute. On 11 September 2012, Mukendi was released from his contract for personal reasons.

==== Tamworth (loan) ====
After less than a month with Barrow, Mukendi joined Conference National rivals Tamworth on 31 August 2012 on a one-month loan deal. He made one appearance for Tamworth before his loan was cancelled when he was released by Barrow on 11 September 2012.

=== Droylsden ===
He signed for Droylsden on 14 September although the club stated that he signed forms but on advice from FA could only play for them from 28 September onwards. The following day he made his club debut in a match against Gloucester City.

=== Stalybridge Celtic ===
He then joined Stalybridge Celtic in October 2012 and made three appearances before leaving the club in November 2012.

=== Salford ===
His next move in 2013 was to Salford City.

=== Goole ===
He briefly signed then for Goole in November 2013, making four league appearances for the club in November and December, scoring once for the club.

=== Southport ===
In February 2014 he re-joined Southport, this time on a permanent deal.

=== Colwyn Bay ===
In the summer of 2014 he moved to Colwyn Bay on trial. He played three games before leaving the club.

=== Nantwich Town ===
He then moved to Nantwich Town in August 2014.

=== Connah's Quay ===
He then briefly signed for Welsh Premier League club Gap Connah's Quay, but left without making a league appearance.

=== Radcliffe Borough ===
In February 2015 he joined Radcliffe Borough.

=== Ramsbottom United ===
The following month he signed for Ramsbottom United, scoring on his debut for the club. He made seven appearances for the club between March and April.

=== Oxford City ===
Following on from this, after scoring as a trialist in July 2015 he joined Oxford City. He made his competitive debut for the club in a 0–6 away win against Truro City, scoring a second-half hat-trick.

=== North Ferriby United ===
In July 2016 he joined North Ferriby United. He left the club in December.

=== Hednesford Town ===
In December 2016 he joined Hednesford Town. He made his debut for the club on Boxing Day but was substituted after 22 minutes after breaking his nose. He left the club in March 2017. He played ten games for the club, scoring four goals.

=== Nantwich Town (second spell) ===
He then re-joined Nantwich Town for a second spell.

=== Redditch United ===
In the summer of 2017 he was on trial at Torquay United but did not earn a contract before joining Redditch United. After an impressive start of two goals in his first four games, Mukendi picked up an injury on 26 August against Dorchester Town, and subsequently missed games against Stratford Town and Lincoln United. In November he was ruled out due to an injury for the rest of the season.

=== Atherton LR ===
In September 2020 he joined North West Counties League club Atherton LR

=== Sheffield ===
In December 2021 he joined Sheffield, having last played for Pennington.

=== AFC Mansfield ===
In September 2022, Mukendi signed for AFC Mansfield.

== International career ==
Mukendi was called up for the Democratic Republic of the Congo under-19 squad in March 2011, being capped for the national team before being ruled out by injury in the Reze tournament.

== Personal life ==
His younger brother, Henoc, is also a footballer.
