= Gary Simpson (footballer, born 1961) =

English footballer and manager

Personal information
- Date of birth: 11 April 1961 (age 65)
- Place of birth: Sheffield, England
- Position: Midfielder

Senior career*
Years	Team	Apps	(Gls)
1980	Stoke City	0	(0)
1980–1985	Boston United	160	(8)
1985–1986	Stafford Rangers	30	(3)
1986–1987	Weymouth	14	(3)
1986–1988	Stafford Rangers	66	(5)
1988–1990	Boston United	33	(1)
1989–1991	Altrincham	25	(0)
1991–1993	Gainsborough Trinity		
1993–1996	Arnold Town	50	(3)
1994–1995	Hyde United	3	(0)

International career
1986–1990	England C	9	

Managerial career
- 1991–1993: Gainsborough Trinity (Player/Manager)
- 2003–2004: Lincoln City (Caretaker manager)
- 2010–2012: Macclesfield Town
- 2013–2014: Lincoln City
- * Club domestic league appearances and goals

Gary Simpson (born 11 April 1961) is an English football manager and former player.

As a player, he was a midfielder. He played for Boston United and Altrincham amongst other clubs. He acted as a coach and assistant to Keith Alexander at a number of Football League clubs, and upon Alexander's death in March 2010 he replaced him as manager at Macclesfield Town until March 2012. He has also had spells as manager of Gainsborough Trinity and Lincoln City, and as assistant manager of Barrow.

== Playing career ==
Simpson started his career with Stoke City, making more than 100 reserve team appearances, before joining Boston United in the summer of 1980. He remained with the club for five seasons, skippering the club in the 1985 FA Trophy final, before leaving to join Stafford Rangers, Weymouth and Altrincham.

Simpson moved on to his first managerial role becoming Player/Manager at Gainsborough Trinity, winning the club's first ever Manager of the Month award in March 1993. Having been in charge at The Northolme for three years, following a 3–1 home defeat to Whitby Town on 9 October 1993 Simpson resigned from his role with Leighton James succeeding him in Trinity's hotseat. He quickly signed as a player for Arnold Townoperating under the stewardship of his one-time Boston United manager Ray O'Brien. He became something of a cult-figure with the club, helping them secure the Northern Counties East League Division One Title for 1993–1994 before joining Hyde United in September 1994. He debuted in the 2–1 Northern Premier League away defeat to Boston United on 14 September and spent a month with the club before leaving. He returned to Arnold Town at the start of the 1995 season before leaving in March 1996 to become Assistant Manager at Ilkeston Town.

He won nine England semi-professional international caps and also captained the Middlesex Wanderers touring side, playing games in Indonesia, Holland and Hungary.

== Coaching career ==
Having first met Keith Alexander whilst both were players at Boston United, Simpson acted as Alexander's assistant manager at Ilkeston Town, Northwich Victoria, Lincoln City, Peterborough United and Macclesfield Town whilst also acting as a scout and coach during Alexander's spell as Director of Football at Bury.

=== Lincoln City ===
Between November 2003 and March 2004, he was caretaker manager with the club for 11 Football League games in the absence of Keith Alexander, winning five, drawing four and losing just two.

On 2 January 2006, Lincoln placed both Alexander and Simpson on gardening leave with John Schofield being given the responsibilities of pro-football. A board meeting three days later saw Alexander return to the manager's seat but Simpson leave the club by mutual consent for footballing reasons.

=== Bury ===
Keith Alexander was appointed Director of Football at Bury in May 2007 with Chris Casper remaining in the managerial chair. On 3 July 2007 Simpson rejoined Alexander at Gigg Lane joining the club as a coach with responsibility for the reserve side and scouting.

=== Macclesfield Town ===
When Keith Alexander died on 3 March 2010, Simpson, who by now was Assistant Manager at Macclesfield Town, took over as caretaker manager. On 13 April 2010, Simpson was appointed permanent manager, signing a two-year deal to the end of the 2010–11 season, after having won 18 points from a possible 30. This was extended in April 2011 by a further year to the end of the 2012–13 season. However, he was asked to stand down by chairman Mike Rance on 18 March 2012 following a run of 16 consecutive games without victory, with the club finding themselves out of the relegation places in League Two only by way of goal difference.

During his time as manager of Macclesfield Town, Simpson always wore yellow socks during matches as a tribute to Keith Alexander. Following the death of Richard Butcher, he wore the number 21 during matches as a tribute to his friend; 21 was Butcher's squad number and was retired by Macclesfield Town in his honour.

=== Return to Lincoln City ===
On 27 February 2013, Simpson was appointed manager of Lincoln City following the departure of David Holdsworth. Prior to his first game in charge, Simpson re-signed former City defender Nat Brown from former club Macclesfield, and the following day he oversaw City's 1–1 draw away at Woking which left Lincoln in 18th place in the Conference two points above the relegation zone.

On 3 November 2014, Simpson was placed on gardening leave while a review of his position of manager was carried out. He was then sacked and replaced by Chris Moyses.

=== Barrow ===
On 9 February 2016, Simpson was appointed as assistant manager of Barrow, but left them in 2017.

== Managerial statistics ==
As of 3 November 2014

Managerial record by team and tenure
Team	From	To	Record					Ref
Team	From	To	G	W	D	L	Win %	Ref
Macclesfield Town	5 March 2010	18 March 2012	111	32	32	47	28.8	
Lincoln City	27 February 2013	3 November 2014	85	32	24	29	37.6	
Total			196	64	56	76	32.7	
