= José Veiga =

Cape Verdean footballer (born 1976)

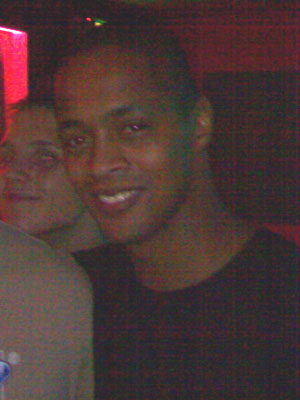
- Veiga in 2007

Personal information
- Full name: José Manuel Monteiro da Veiga
- Date of birth: 18 December 1976 (age 49)
- Place of birth: Lisbon, Portugal
- Height: 1.88 m (6 ft 2 in)
- Position: Goalkeeper

Youth career
- 1987–1988: Ponte Frielas
- 1988–1995: Benfica

Senior career*
| Years | Team | Apps | (Gls) |
| 1995–1996 | Benfica | 0 | (0) |
| 1996–1998 | Alverca | 47 | (0) |
| 1998–2002 | Levante | 130 | (0) |
| 2002 | → Valladolid (loan) | 0 | (0) |
| 2002–2005 | Estrela Amadora | 92 | (0) |
| 2005–2006 | Olhanense | 2 | (0) |
| 2006–2008 | Tamworth | 40 | (0) |
| 2008 | Atherstone Town | 0 | (0) |
| 2008–2009 | Hereford United | 1 | (0) |
| 2009–2012 | Macclesfield Town | 86 | (0) |
| 2012–2013 | Harrogate Town | 13 | (0) |
| 2013–2014 | Tamworth | 0 | (0) |
| 2013–2015 | Worcester City | 44 | (0) |
| 2015 | Nantwich Town | 2 | (0) |
| 2015–2016 | Redditch United | 6 | (0) |
| 2016–2017 | Rushall Olympic | 26 | (0) |
| 2017–2021 | Hednesford Town | 0 | (0) |
| Total | | 489 | (0) |

International career
| 1994 | Portugal U18 | 2 | (0) |
| 2004–2007 | Cape Verde | 14 | (0) |
- * Club domestic league appearances and goals

José Manuel Monteiro da Veiga (born 18 December 1976) is a retired Cape Verdean footballer who played as a goalkeeper.

He competed professionally in the second divisions of Portugal and Spain, also appearing for several teams in the lower leagues of England.

Born in Portugal, Veiga played for the Cape Verde national team, winning 14 caps in three years.

== Club career ==
=== Portugal and Spain ===
Born in Lisbon, Veiga was brought up in local S.L. Benfica's youth system, but only managed to be third choice in the 1995–96 season. He then spent two years with neighbouring Alverca in the second division, after which he moved to Spain and joined Levante UD in the country's third level.

With the Valencian team Veiga rarely missed a game, being essential in their promotion in his first season, as champions, and helping them maintain their division two status in the following three years. In the January transfer window of 2001–02, he was loaned to Real Valladolid in La Liga, but failed to make any competitive appearances.

Veiga wrapped up his career in Portugal playing three years for C.F. Estrela da Amadora – in the 2003–04 campaign he had his first and only top flight experience, but the team ranked 18th and last – and one for S.C. Olhanense (second tier).

=== Tamworth ===
Veiga trained with English clubs Walsall and Bury, before having trials at Tamworth during the 2006–07 pre-season. He had to wait for international clearance before boss Mark Cooper could bring him to The Lamb Ground but, on 11 November 2006, the player signed for the Conference National side.

Despite Tamworth's relegation, Veiga signed a one-year contract extension on 10 July 2007. On 14 March of the following year, it was announced that he would be leaving at the end of 2007–08: he missed most of the campaign after dislocating his shoulder during training, and was told by manager Gary Mills that he did not figure in his long-term plans.

=== Hereford United ===
Veiga signed for League One's Hereford United on 26 December 2008, on non-contract terms as emergency goalkeeping cover. He was an unused substitute for the match against Tranmere Rovers, and made his debut in a 4–2 away defeat against Hartlepool United on 4 April 2009.

=== Macclesfield Town ===
On 4 August 2009, Veiga agreed to a one-year contract with Macclesfield Town. He went on to become the regular starter for the Cheshire team's reserves that season and also played in five league matches, keeping a clean sheet in the final game, a 0–0 at Lincoln City. He also played in an FA Cup contest at Milton Keynes Dons.

Veiga's performances for the reserves were enough to secure him a further one-year contract with Macclesfield. In May 2011 he signed a further one-year deal with the club but, exactly one year later, was released due to the expiry of his contract.

== International career ==
A Cape Verde international since 2004, Veiga had a falling out with the national team's management in March 2007, and was left out of the squad for the 2008 Africa Cup of Nations qualifier against Algeria in favour of Ernesto Soares. He did however receive a re-call for the game against Gambia on 16 June, in the same competition.

In late May 2010, Veiga was picked for a friendly with Portugal, who were preparing for the FIFA World Cup. As the 117th-ranked team managed an historic 0–0 draw in Covilhã, he remained on the bench.

== Honours ==
Levante

- Segunda División B: 1998–99

Individual

- Tamworth Player of the Year: 2006–07
