= Matthew Lowe (footballer, born 1990) =

English footballer

Personal information
- Date of birth: 20 October 1990 (age 36)
- Place of birth: Stoke-on-Trent, England
- Position: Defender

Team information
- Current team: Nantwich Town

Youth career
- –2009: Macclesfield Town

Senior career*
Years	Team	Apps	(Gls)
2009–2011	Macclesfield Town	11	(0)
2011	→ Kidderminster Harriers (loan)	1	(0)
2011–	Nantwich Town	0	(0)
- * Club domestic league appearances and goals as of 00:00, 10 March 2011 (UTC)

Matthew Lowe (born 20 October 1990) is an English footballer who plays for Nantwich Town. He plays as a defender.

== Career ==
Born in Stoke-on-Trent, England, Lowe is a central defender who rose through the ranks at Macclesfield Town. He broke into the first team in the 2009–10 season. He not only plays at centre half, but also right back too. His long throws cause problems in opposing penalty areas. In March 2011 he was sent out on loan to Kidderminster Harriers and was released by the Silkmen at the end of the season. In July 2011, Lowe joined Nantwich Town along with striker Ben Mills from Stafford Rangers.
