= Kristian Dennis =

English footballer (born 1990)

Personal information
- Full name: Kristian Dennis
- Date of birth: 11 March 1990 (age 36)
- Place of birth: Manchester, England
- Height: 6 ft 1 in (1.85 m)
- Position: Forward

Team information
- Current team: Altrincham

Youth career
- –2008: Macclesfield Town

Senior career*
Years	Team	Apps	(Gls)
2007–2010	Macclesfield Town	4	(1)
2008	→ Ashton United (loan)	3	(1)
2009–2010	→ Woodley Sports (loan)		
2010	Woodley Sports	15	(8)
2010–2011	Mossley	31	(10)
2011–2013	Curzon Ashton	82	(69)
2013–2016	Stockport County	60	(27)
2015–2016	→ Macclesfield Town (loan)	38	(22)
2016–2018	Chesterfield	78	(27)
2018–2020	Notts County	54	(15)
2019	→ Grimsby Town (loan)	13	(1)
2020–2022	St Mirren	30	(3)
2022–2023	Carlisle United	61	(22)
2023–2026	Tranmere Rovers	92	(15)
2026–	Altrincham	0	(0)
- * Club domestic league appearances and goals as of 11:21, 1 July 2026 (UTC)

Kristian Dennis (born 12 March 1990) is an English footballer who plays as a forward for National League club Altrincham.

Dennis began his career at Football League Two club Macclesfield Town, graduating from the Centre of Excellence and Youth Academy and making his first-team debut in 2007. He had brief loan spells with Ashton United and Woodley Sports before he was released in May 2010 following the 2009–10 Football League Two season.

He joined Woodley Sports permanently, before moving on to Mossley in November 2010. He signed with Curzon Ashton in June 2011, and went on to score 72 goals in two seasons with the club, before joining Stockport County in May 2013. He spent three seasons with County, though spent the third season on loan at Macclesfield Town, where he scored 29 goals, picking up the National League Player of the Month award for November 2015. He returned to the English Football League when he signed with Chesterfield in May 2016, and despite suffering consecutive relegation from League One and League Two, he impressed with 32 goals in 90 appearances in a struggling team.

== Club career ==
=== Macclesfield Town ===
==== 2005–06 season ====
Dennis formed part of Macclesfield Town's Centre of Excellence, which beat clubs like Manchester United and Manchester City in scouting local talented players. In May 2006, the Macclesfield Express reported that Dennis was one of ten Macclesfield Town U16 squad members, including Christopher Dykes, Danny White, Ben Hunt, Shaun Brisley, James Rothel, Danny Egan, Chris Hirst, Matt Pearson and Jordan Walker who signed as first year scholars for the club's U18 Academy squad, where they also joined Christian Millar. During his youth team career at Macclesfield Town, Dennis was coached by John Askey, and played alongside Wayne Rooney's younger brother, John Rooney, as well as Nick Blackman, Matthew Flynn, Shaun Brisley and Christian Millar.

==== 2006–07 season ====
In November 2006, Dennis scored a first half goal for Macclesfield Town's U18 squad in a 1–1 away fixture against League leaders Walsall in the 2006–07 North West Conference Group B season. Dennis gave Macclesfield Town the lead in the 40th minute and missed a couple of opportunities inside the Walsall 18-yard-box before half time. Dennis started for Macclesfield Town's U18 squad in a 2006–07 FA Youth Cup Third Round 3–0 away defeat against Everton U18 on 4 January 2007. He was replaced by Christopher Dykes in the 60th minute.

==== 2007–08 season ====
In August 2007, Dennis debuted in his first competitive appearance for Macclesfield Town's first-team in a friendly against Marine AFC in which he scored. He made his Football League Two debut in a 3–0 defeat at Rotherham United on 1 January 2008, coming onto the pitch as an 89th-minute substitute for Danny Thomas. In January 2008, Dennis scored for Macclesfield Town's U18 Academy squad in a 2–1 2007–08 FA Youth Cup Fourth Round defeat against Sunderland's U18 Academy squad at the Stadium of Light. After shooting wide from goalkeeper Martin Hunter's post in a one-on-one opportunity and then being denied by a point-blank stop from him again, Dennis rose high to head from a cross from John Rooney. In May 2008, Dennis was one of four second-year Academy scholars, with Shaun Brisley, Chris Hirst and Christian Millar, to receive professional contracts for the 2008–09 season, whilst six others were released from the club's Academy.

==== 2008–09 season ====
In July 2008, Macclesfield Express branded Dennis and Chris Hirst as two stars of Macclesfield Town's highly successful U18 Academy Squad following a strong showing in the Puma Youth Alliance League and a run to the fifth round of the 2007–08 FA Youth Cup, after signing their 12-month deals with the first team. Dennis and Hirst joined Shaun Brisley, Christian Millar, James Jennings, Izak Reid, Jordan Hadfield, Matthew Flynn and Nick Blackman as first-team squad members who were trained by John Askey and Mick Holgate before getting a professional deal. In November 2008, Dennis joined Northern Premier League Premier Division side Ashton United on loan. Back with Macclesfield, he made his first League Two appearance of the 2008–09 season as a substitute in a 1–0 defeat to Morecambe at Moss Rose on 13 April. He scored his first goal in the English Football League 12 days later, in a 2–1 home win over Barnet, after putting the ball into the net from a Macclesfield corner for the winning goal of the game.

==== 2009–10 season ====
In July 2009, Dennis was one of five strikers, with Emile Sinclaire, Stephen Reed, Kyle Wilson and Vinny Mukendi, in Macclesfield Town's first-team squad ahead of the 2009–10 season. In November 2009, he joined Northern Premier League Division One North side Woodley Sports on an initial one-month loan, which was extended for a second month, before he returned to Macclesfield in mid-January 2010. He scored regularly for the "Saxons", including a hat-trick against Radcliffe Borough. On 14 May 2010, he was one of 11 players released by Macclesfield at the conclusion of the 2009–10 season.

=== Non-League ===
Dennis had a trial with Kidderminster Harriers in July 2010. He instead signed with Woodley Sports, and scored 12 goals for them before joining Mossley in November 2010. He scored 16 goals in 31 appearances for the "Lilywhites", helping the club to a 15th-place finish in the Northern Premier League Division One North. He signed for Curzon Ashton in June 2011. The "Nash" finished as runners-up to AFC Fylde in the Northern Premier League Division One North during the 2011–12 campaign, losing out to Witton Albion in the play-off final. They finished seventh in the 2012–13 season. On 1 April, Dennis scored six goals as Ashton recorded a club record 10–1 victory over Wakefield. On 23 April, Curzon drew 1–1 with North Ferriby United in the Northern Premier League Challenge Cup Final at Throstle Nest, and lost 2–1 in the resulting penalty shoot-out, with Dennis being the only Curzon player to successfully convert his penalty. He scored 72 goals in his two seasons at the Tameside Stadium, scoring 26 goals in his first season and 46 goals in his second season. During his time at the club he worked as an archive administrator for Just Costs Solicitors in Manchester city centre.

Dennis signed for Ian Bogie's Stockport County in May 2013. He scored a hat-trick in a 5–1 win at Gainsborough Trinity on 4 January. The "Hatters" went on to record a 14th-place finish in the Conference North by the end of the 2013–14 campaign, with Dennis contributing ten goals from 32 league games. He scored 12 goals in 32 appearances in all competitions in the 2014–15 season, as County posted an 11th-place finish. He was transfer-listed at Edgeley Park by new manager Neil Young in May 2015.

On 24 June 2015, Dennis returned to Macclesfield Town on a season-long loan. He was named as National League Player of the Month for November after scoring seven goals in four games for the "Silkmen". He scored a total of 29 goals in 45 appearances during the 2015–16 season, helping John Askey's Macclesfield to a tenth-place finish. Stockport were keen to recall Dennis in the January transfer window in order to sell him on before the expiry of his contract at the end of the season, but were unable to do so as they had failed to insert a recall option in the loan deal.

=== Chesterfield ===
On 10 May 2016, Dennis signed for League One side Chesterfield. Manager Danny Wilson said that "he's a very level-headed boy who is determined to do well in the Football League and become an established player. He is prolific and I think he can offer us a great deal". He scored his first goal for Chesterfield in an EFL Trophy tie against Wolves Under-23s on 30 August. He scored ten goals in 42 appearances during the 2016–17 campaign, finishing as the "Spireites" top-scorer, though could not prevent Gary Caldwell's side being relegated in last place. He was nominated for the EFL League Two Player of the Month award for November after scoring three goals and providing one assist for Jack Lester's struggling side. He again finished as top-scorer at the Proact Stadium in the 2017–18 season with 21 goals in 48 games, and despite his 19-goal tally being the joint-fifth highest in League Two, Chesterfield were again relegated in last place. On 22 May 2018, Dennis was transfer-listed by incoming manager Martin Allen after rejecting the club's offer of a new contract in search of a return to the EFL.

=== Notts County ===
On 31 May 2018, Dennis signed for local rivals Notts County on a three-year contract (two years with the club having the option for a third term). He joined after Chesterfield were relegated for a reported fee of £150,000.

On 31 January 2019, Dennis signed for League Two rival Grimsby Town until the end of the 2018/19 season.

=== St Mirren ===
In August 2020, Dennis signed a two-year deal with St Mirren. Upon his move to the Paisley club, manager Jim Goodwin said '"He is a proven goalscorer, he is a great age and a natural finisher."

=== Carlisle United ===
On 31 January 2022, Dennis joined League Two side Carlisle United on an 18-month contract.

The 2022–23 season saw Dennis score twenty league goals as Carlisle reached the play-offs, being awarded the Players' Player of the Year at the end of season awards ceremony. On 28 May 2023, Dennis was used as a substitute in the play-off final, scoring his penalty in the shoot-out as Carlisle defeated Stockport County to earn promotion to League One. Following promotion, he was offered a new contract.

=== Tranmere Rovers ===
On 5 June 2023, Dennis was announced to be returning to League Two with Tranmere Rovers on a two-year contract, having rejected the new contract offer from Carlisle. On 12 May 2026, the club announced he would be leaving in the summer once his contract expired.

=== Altrincham ===
On 1 July 2026, Dennis joined National League club Altrincham.

== Style of play ==
Former Chesterfield manager Gary Caldwell described Dennis as "first and foremost a team player... in terms of his workrate, running after lost causes, shutting people down and working for the team".

== Personal life ==
Dennis attended St Paul's Catholic High School in Manchester.

== Career statistics ==
As of end of 2025–26 season

Appearances and goals by club, season and competition
Club	Season	League			National cup (Note: Includes FA Cup, Scottish Cup)		League cup (Note: Includes EFL Cup, Scottish League Cup)		Other		Total	
Club	Season	Division	Apps	Goals	Apps	Goals	Apps	Goals	Apps	Goals	Apps	Goals
Macclesfield Town	2007–08	League Two	1	0	0	0	0	0	1	1	2	1
Macclesfield Town	2008–09	League Two	3	1	0	0	0	0	1 (Note: Appearance in Football League Trophy)	0	4	1
Macclesfield Town	2009–10	League Two	0	0	0	0	0	0	0	0	0	0
Macclesfield Town	Total		4	1	0	0	0	0	2	1	6	2
Mossley	2010–11	Northern Premier League Division One North	31	16	0	0	–		0	0	31	16
Curzon Ashton	2011–12	Northern Premier League Division One North	42	25	2	1	–		0	0	44	26
Curzon Ashton	2012–13	Northern Premier League Division One North	40	44	4	2	–		0	0	44	46
Curzon Ashton	Total		82	69	6	3	0	0	0	0	88	72
Stockport County	2013–14	Conference North	32	10	0	0	–		0	0	32	10
Stockport County	2014–15	Conference North	28	12	1	0	–		3 (Note: Appearances in FA Trophy)	0	32	12
Stockport County	Total		60	22	1	0	–		3	0	64	22
Macclesfield Town (loan)	2015–16	National League	38	22	1	1	–		5	4	44	27
Chesterfield	2016–17	League One	35	8	2	0	0	0	5 (Note: Appearance(s) in EFL Trophy)	2	42	10
Chesterfield	2017–18	League Two	43	19	1	0	1	1	3	1	48	21
Chesterfield	Total		78	27	3	0	1	1	8	3	90	31
Notts County	2018–19	League Two	24	3	1	0	0	0	4	3	29	6
Notts County	2019–20	National League	30	12	2	1	–		3	2	35	15
Notts County	Total		54	15	3	1	0	0	7	5	64	21
Grimsby Town (loan)	2018–19	League Two	13	1	0	0	0	0	0	0	13	1
St Mirren	2020–21	Scottish Premiership	17	3	4	2	3	0	–		24	5
St Mirren	2021–22	Scottish Premiership	13	0	1	0	2	1	–		16	1
St Mirren	Total		30	3	5	2	5	1	–		40	6
Carlisle United	2021–22	League Two	17	2	0	0	0	0	0	0	17	2
Carlisle United	2022–23	League Two	44	20	1	0	1	1	2	0	48	21
Carlisle United	Total		61	22	1	0	1	1	2	0	65	23
Tranmere Rovers	2023–24	League Two	30	2	1	0	2	0	1	0	34	2
Tranmere Rovers	2024–25	League Two	37	9	1	0	2	0	4	2	44	11
Tranmere Rovers	2025–26	League Two	25	4	1	0	0	0	2	0	28	4
Tranmere Rovers	Total		92	15	3	0	4	0	7	2	106	17
Career total (Note: Appearances for Ashton United, Woodley Sports and Curzon Ashton not recorded.)			538	213	23	7	11	3	39	15	611	238

== Honours ==
Curzon Ashton

- Northern Premier League Challenge Cup runner-up: 2013

Carlisle United

- EFL League Two play-offs: 2023

Individual

- National League Player of the Month: November 2015
