= 2008–09 Macclesfield Town F.C. season =

Macclesfield Town F.C.
2008–09 season
- Manager: Keith Alexander
- Football League Two: 20th
- FA Cup: Third Round
- League Cup: Second Round
- Football League Trophy: First Round

This article documents the 2008–09 season of Cheshire football club Macclesfield Town F.C.

== League table ==
Pos	Team	Pld	W	D	L	GF	GA	GD	Pts
17	Torquay United	46	14	15	17	64	55	+9	57
18	Crewe Alexandra	46	15	10	21	68	73	−5	55
19	Macclesfield Town	46	12	18	16	49	58	−9	54
20	Lincoln City	46	13	11	22	42	65	−23	50
21	Barnet	46	12	12	22	47	63	−16	48

Updated to match(es) played on unknown. Source: football-league.co.uk

== Results ==
=== League Two ===
9 August 2008 1	Shrewsbury Town	4–0	Macclesfield Town	Shrewsbury
	Cansdell-Sherriff 31'; Holt 51' (pen.); Coughlan 79'; Hibbert 85'			Stadium: Prostar Stadium; Attendance: 5,812

16 August 2008 2	Macclesfield Town	0–2	Bradford City	Macclesfield
			Thorne 10', 14'	Stadium: Moss Rose; Attendance: 2,556

23 August 2008 3	Accrington Stanley	2–0	Macclesfield Town	Accrington
	Mullin 50'; Ryan 60'			Stadium: Crown Ground; Attendance: 1,323

30 August 2008 4	Macclesfield Town	0–6	Darlington	Macclesfield
	Hessey (red card) 62'		Clarke 26', 53', 64' (pen.), 67'; Walker 56' (o.g.); Austin 89'	Stadium: Moss Rose; Attendance: 1,554

6 September 2008 5	Macclesfield Town	2–1	Luton Town	Macclesfield
	Yeo 12'; Morgan 61'		Charles 90'	Stadium: Moss Rose; Attendance: 2,349

13 September 2008 6	Bournemouth	0–1	Macclesfield Town	Bournemouth
			Evans 2' (red card) 17'	Stadium: Fitness First Stadium; Attendance: 3,922

20 September 2008 7	Port Vale	1–4	Macclesfield Town	Stoke on Trent
	Dodds 44'		Dunfield 36'; Yeo 75', 83' (pen.); Reid 86'	Stadium: Vale Park; Attendance: 6,645

27 September 2008 8	Macclesfield Town	1–4	Exeter City	Macclesfield
	Yeo 45'		Stansfield 1', 48'; Harley 35'; Gill 85'	Stadium: Moss Rose; Attendance: 1,854

4 October 2008 9	Brentford	1–0	Macclesfield Town	London
	MacDonald 15'			Stadium: Griffin Park; Attendance: 4,773

11 October 2008 10	Macclesfield Town	4–2	Aldershot Town	Macclesfield
	Evans 48'; Thomas 55', 58'; Green 83'		Hudson 51'; Hylton 64'	Stadium: Moss Rose; Attendance: 1,857

18 October 2008 11	Notts County	1–1	Macclesfield Town	Nottingham
	Facey 48'; Evans (red card) 67'		Yeo 65'	Stadium: Meadow Lane; Attendance: 4,600

21 October 2008 12	Macclesfield Town	1–2	Lincoln City	Macclesfield
	Yeo 5'		Beevers 45'; Frecklington 82'	Stadium: Moss Rose; Attendance: 1,247

25 October 2008 13	Macclesfield Town	1–2	Rotherham United	Macclesfield
	Green 90'; Jennings (red card) 90'		Tonge 5'; Sharps 90' (red card) 90'	Stadium: Moss Rose; Attendance: 2,020

1 November 2008 14	Macclesfield Town	0–1	Gillingham	Macclesfield
	Miller 18'			Stadium: Moss Rose; Attendance: 1,635

15 November 2008 15	Rochdale	1–1	Macclesfield Town	Rochdale
	Rundle 66'		Brown 81'	Stadium: Spotland; Attendance: 3,013

22 November 2008 16	Barnet	1–3	Macclesfield Town	London
	O'Flynn 59'		Gritton 15'; Green 87'; Brown 89'	Stadium: Underhill; Attendance: 1,579

25 November 2008 17	Macclesfield Town	1–0	Grimsby Town	Macclesfield
	Brown 68'			Stadium: Moss Rose; Attendance: 1,182

2 December 2008 18	Wycombe Wanderers	4–0	Macclesfield Town	High Wycombe
	Vieira 11', 51'; Balanta 45'; Johnson 71'			Stadium: Adams Park; Attendance: 3,770

6 December 2008 19	Macclesfield Town	1–1	Bury	Macclesfield
	Gritton 6'; Flynn (red card) 74'		Dawson 8'	Stadium: Moss Rose; Attendance: 2,431

12 December 2008 20	Chesterfield	2–4	Macclesfield Town	Chesterfield
	Ward 38', 67'; Goodall (red card) 90'		Gritton 23', 57'; Bell 25'; Evans 77'; Green (red card) 90'	Stadium: Saltergate; Attendance: 2,451

20 December 2008 21	Macclesfield Town	0–4	Dagenham & Redbridge	Macclesfield
			Benson 4', 19'; Taiwo 7'; Saunders 48'	Stadium: Moss Rose; Attendance: 1,909

26 December 2008 22	Morecambe	4–1	Macclesfield Town	Morecambe
	McStay 17'; Carlton 24'; Drummond 63'; Howe 79'		Reid 3'	Stadium: Christie Park; Attendance: 2,578

28 December 2008 23	Macclesfield Town	3–1	Chester City	Macclesfield
	Brown 6'; Evans 76' (pen.); Gritton 85'		Lowe 56'	Stadium: Moss Rose; Attendance: 2,219

17 January 2009 24	Aldershot Town	1–1	Macclesfield Town	Aldershot
	Hudson 90'		Evans 21'	Stadium: EBB Stadium; Attendance: 3,018

24 January 2009 25	Macclesfield Town	2–0	Brentford	Macclesfield
	Sinclair 45'; Evans 58' (pen.)			Stadium: Moss Rose; Attendance: 1,942

27 January 2009 26	Macclesfield Town	0–0	Wycombe Wanderers	Macclesfield
				Stadium: Moss Rose; Attendance: 1,306

31 January 2009 27	Rotherham United	2–0	Macclesfield Town	Sheffield
	Hudson 12'; Reid 76'			Stadium: Don Valley Stadium; Attendance: 2,945

10 February 2009 28	Exeter City	4–0	Macclesfield Town	Exeter
	Stansfield 16'; Logan 44'; Saunders 73'; McAllister 75'			Stadium: St James Park; Attendance: 2,839

14 February 2009 29	Macclesfield Town	0–1	Rochdale	Macclesfield
			Kennedy 45' (pen.)	Stadium: Moss Rose; Attendance: 2,396

17 February 2009 30	Macclesfield Town	1–1	Notts County	Macclesfield
	Yeo 26'		Hamshaw 72'	Stadium: Moss Rose; Attendance: 1,370

21 February 2009 31	Gillingham	3–1	Macclesfield Town	Gillingham
	King 2'; Barcham 74', 88'		Evans 80' (pen.)	Stadium: Priestfield; Attendance: 4,620

25 February 2009 32	Macclesfield Town	0–2	Port Vale	Macclesfield
			Ahmed 85'; Dodds 90'	Stadium: Moss Rose; Attendance: 2,267

28 February 2009 33	Macclesfield Town	3–0	Shrewsbury Town	Macclesfield
	Cansdell-Sherriff 21' (o.g.); Evans 53' (pen.); Brown 90'			Stadium: Moss Rose; Attendance: 2,553

3 March 2009 34	Bradford City	1–0	Macclesfield Town	Bradford
	Furman 60'			Stadium: Coral Windows Stadium; Attendance: 11,908

7 March 2009 35	Darlington	1–2	Macclesfield Town	Darlington
	Poole 61'		Evans 40' (67), pen.'	Stadium: The Darlington Arena; Attendance: 2,995

10 March 2009 36	Macclesfield Town	0–2	Accrington Stanley	Macclesfield
	Cansdell-Sherriff 21' (o.g.); Evans 53' (pen.); Brown 90'		Williams 42'; Procter 89'	Stadium: Moss Rose; Attendance: 1,746

14 March 2009 37	Macclesfield Town	0–2	Bournemouth	Macclesfield
			Bradbury 50', 70'	Stadium: Moss Rose; Attendance: 1,589

21 March 2009 38	Luton Town	1–0	Macclesfield Town	Luton
	Craddock 69' (pen.)			Stadium: Kenilworth Road; Attendance: 5,363

28 March 2009 39	Dagenham & Redbridge	2–1	Macclesfield Town	London
	Benson 71'; Ritchie 83'		Rooney 38'	Stadium: Victoria Road; Attendance: 1,347

31 March 2009 40	Lincoln City	1–0	Macclesfield Town	Lincoln
	Pătulea 27'			Stadium: Sincil Bank; Attendance: 2,478

4 April 2009 41	Macclesfield Town	1–1	Chesterfield	Macclesfield
	Evans 15'		Gritton 8'	Stadium: Moss Rose; Attendance: 2,276

11 April 2009 42	Chester City	0–2	Macclesfield Town	Chester
			Rooney 8'; Evans 29'	Stadium: Deva Stadium; Attendance: 2,248

13 April 2009 43	Macclesfield Town	0–1	Morecambe	Macclesfield
			Artell 85'	Stadium: Moss Rose; Attendance: 1,773

18 April 2009 44	Bury	3–0	Macclesfield Town	Bury
	Bishop 4'; Hurst 57', 75'			Stadium: Gigg Lane; Attendance: 3,499

25 April 2009 45	Macclesfield Town	2–1	Barnet	Macclesfield
	Brown 2'; Dennis 82'		Adomah 54'	Stadium: Moss Rose; Attendance: 1,619

2 May 2009 46	Grimsby Town	0–0	Macclesfield Town	Grimsby
				Stadium: Blundell Park; Attendance: 6,876

=== FA Cup ===
8 November 2008 Round 1	Harlow Town	0–2	Macclesfield Town	Harlow
			Brisley 65'; Dunfield 86'	Stadium: Barrows Farm Stadium; Attendance: 2,149

28 November 2008 Round 2	Port Vale	1–3	Macclesfield Town	Stoke on Trent
	Dodds 71'		Green 9', 73'; Gritton 90'	Stadium: Vale Park; Attendance: 4,684

3 January 2009 Round 3	Macclesfield Town	0–1	Everton	Macclesfield
			Osman 43'	Stadium: Moss Rose; Attendance: 6,008

=== League Cup ===
12 August 2008 Round 1	Macclesfield Town	2–0	Blackpool	Macclesfield
	Brisley 25'; Gritton 59'; Dunfield (red card) 59'		Southern (red card) 57'	Stadium: Moss Rose; Attendance: 1,631

27 August 2008 Round 2	West Ham United	4–1 (a.e.t.)	Macclesfield Town	London
	Bowyer 74'; Cole 100'; Hines 105'; Reid 117'		Evans 5'	Stadium: Boleyn Ground; Attendance: 10,055

=== Football League Trophy ===
2 September 2008 Northern Section Round 1	Crewe Alexandra	3–0	Macclesfield Town	Crewe
	Schumacher 5'; Jones 27'; O'Donnell 42'		Gritton (red card) 13'	Stadium: Gresty Road; Attendance: 2,463

== Players ==
=== First-team squad ===
Includes all players who were awarded squad numbers during the season.

Note: Flags indicate national team as defined under FIFA eligibility rules; some limited exceptions apply. Players may hold more than one non-FIFA nationality.

No.	Pos.	Nation	Player
1	GK	(England) ENG	Jonny Brain
2	MF	(England) ENG	Izak Reid
3	DF	(Sierra Leone) SLE	Ahmed Deen
4	DF	(England) ENG	Sean Hessey
5	DF	(England) ENG	Richard Walker
6	DF	(England) ENG	Paul Morgan (on loan from Bury)
7	MF	(England) ENG	Lee Bell
8	FW	(England) ENG	Francis Green
9	FW	(England) ENG	Emile Sinclair (on loan from Nottingham Forest)
10	FW	(England) ENG	Simon Yeo
11	MF	(England) ENG	Jamie Tolley
12	MF	(England) ENG	Danny Thomas
13	GK	(England) ENG	Matt Towns
14	FW	(England) ENG	John Rooney
15	FW	(Barbados) BRB	Neil Harvey
16	DF	(England) ENG	Shaun Brisley

No.	Pos.	Nation	Player
17	MF	(England) ENG	Jordan Hadfield
18	FW	(England) ENG	Kristian Dennis
19	DF	(England) ENG	James Jennings
20	DF	(England) ENG	Rikki Bains
21	MF	(England) ENG	Chris Hirst
22	DF	(England) ENG	Matthew Flynn
23	MF	(England) ENG	Christian Millar
24	FW	(England) ENG	Vinny Mukendi
26	FW	(England) ENG	Gareth Evans
27	DF	(England) ENG	Nat Brown (on loan from Wrexham)
28	DF	(Argentina) ARG	Joaquin Medinilla-Cabotti
29	DF	(Saint Kitts and Nevis) SKN	Patrece Liburd
32	MF	(England) ENG	Colin Daniel (on loan from Crewe Alexandra)
33	MF	(England) ENG	Aaron Chalmers

=== Left club during season ===
Note: Flags indicate national team as defined under FIFA eligibility rules; some limited exceptions apply. Players may hold more than one non-FIFA nationality.

No.	Pos.	Nation	Player
24	DF	(England) ENG	Clayton McDonald (on loan from Manchester City)
9	FW	(Scotland) SCO	Martin Gritton
20	FW	(England) ENG	Nick Blackman

No.	Pos.	Nation	Player
25	MF	(Canada) CAN	Terry Dunfield
29	FW	(England) ENG	Tom Elliott (on loan from Leeds United)
25	MF	(England) ENG	Kyle Fraser-Allen (on loan from Tottenham Hotspur)
