= 2009–10 Macclesfield Town F.C. season =

Macclesfield Town F.C.
2009–10 season
- Manager: Keith Alexander Until March 2010 & Gary Simpson From March 2010
- Football League Two: 19th
- FA Cup: First Round
- League Cup: First Round
- Football League Trophy: Second Round

This article documents the 2009–10 season of Cheshire football club Macclesfield Town F.C.

== League table ==
Pos	Team	Pld	W	D	L	GF	GA	GD	Pts
17	Torquay United	46	14	15	17	64	55	+9	57
18	Crewe Alexandra	46	15	10	21	68	73	−5	55
19	Macclesfield Town	46	12	18	16	49	58	−9	54
20	Lincoln City	46	13	11	22	42	65	−23	50
21	Barnet	46	12	12	22	47	63	−16	48

Updated to match(es) played on unknown. Source: football-league.co.uk

== Results ==
=== League Two ===
8 August 2009 1	Northampton Town	0–0	Macclesfield Town	Northampton
				Stadium: Sixfield; Attendance: 4,064

15 August 2009 2	Macclesfield Town	0–4	Notts County	Macclesfield
			Ravenhill 13'; Hunt 45'; Wright 50' (o.g.); Westcarr 90'	Stadium: Moss Rose; Attendance: 2,785

18 August 2009 3	Macclesfield Town	2–0	Port Vale	Macclesfield
	Tipton 6'; Bencherif 68'			Stadium: Moss Rose; Attendance: 3,433

22 August 2009 4	Morecambe	2–2	Macclesfield Town	Morecambe
	Twiss 49'; Artell 81'		Tipton 12' (pen.); Draper 58'	Stadium: Christie Park; Attendance: 1,757

29 August 2009 5	Macclesfield Town	1–3	Rotherham United	Macclesfield
	Tipton 45'		Le Fondre 24'; Pope 37'; Harrison 87'	Stadium: Moss Rose; Attendance: 1,972

5 September 2009 6	Crewe Alexandra	2–1	Macclesfield Town	Crewe
	Zola 12'; Grant 85'		Sappleton 32'	Stadium: Gresty Road; Attendance: 4,151

12 September 2009 7	Macclesfield Town	1–1	Barnet	Macclesfield
	Sappleton 12'		Morgan 41' (o.g.)	Stadium: Moss Rose; Attendance: 1,125

19 September 2009 8	Chesterfield	4–1	Macclesfield Town	Chesterfield
	Small 4'; Lester 32'; Lowry 38'; McDermott 45'		Bencherif 79'	Stadium: Saltergate; Attendance: 3,138

26 September 2009 9	Macclesfield Town	2–1	Torquay United	Macclesfield
	Bencherif 61', 68'		Benyon 51'	Stadium: Moss Rose; Attendance: 1,745

29 September 2009 10	Burton Albion	1–1	Macclesfield Town	Burton on Trent
	Pearson 37'		Sinclair 14'	Stadium: Pirelli Stadium; Attendance: 2,332

3 October 2009 11	Darlington	0–1	Macclesfield Town	Darlington
			Smith 15' (o.g.)	Stadium: Darlington Arena; Attendance: 1,763

10 October 2009 12	Macclesfield Town	0–1	Lincoln City	Macclesfield
			Howe 70' (pen.)	Stadium: Moss Rose; Attendance: 2,006

16 October 2009 13	Cheltenham Town	1–2	Macclesfield Town	Cheltenham
	Hammond 69'		Sappleton 27'; Rooney 43'	Stadium: Whaddon Road; Attendance: 2,930

24 October 2009 14	Macclesfield Town	2–2	Dagenham & Redbridge	Macclesfield
	Tipton 33' (pen.); Sappleton 66'		Thomas 79'; Arber 90'	Stadium: Moss Rose; Attendance: 1,574

31 October 2009 15	Macclesfield Town	2–2	Bradford City	Macclesfield
	Daniel 4'; Bencherif 41'		Hanson 58'; Williams 66'	Stadium: Moss Rose; Attendance: 2,526

14 November 2009 16	Aldershot Town	0–0	Macclesfield Town	Aldershot
				Stadium: Recreation Ground; Attendance: 2,646

21 November 2009 17	Macclesfield Town	1–2	Bournemouth	Macclesfield
	Brisley 35'		Pitman 45', 78'	Stadium: Moss Rose; Attendance: 1,413

28 November 2009 18	Macclesfield Town	0–0	Grimsby Town	Macclesfield
				Stadium: Moss Rose; Attendance: 1,409

5 December 2009 19	Rochdale	3–0	Macclesfield Town	Rochdale
	Atkinson 30'; Wiseman 33'; Taylor 90'			Stadium: Spotland; Attendance: 3,003

12 December 2009 20	Macclesfield Town	3–1	Hereford United	Macclesfield
	Sinclair 43', 68'; Wright 45'		Constantine 90'	Stadium: Moss Rose; Attendance: 1,406

26 December 2009 21	Shrewsbury Town	2–2	Macclesfield Town	Shrewsbury
	Fairhurst 45'; Hibbert 90'		Brown 44'; Daniel 45'	Stadium: Prostar Stadium; Attendance: 5,942

29 December 2009 22	Macclesfield Town	4–1	Crewe Alexandra	Macclesfield
	Wright 4'; Bolland 13'; Daniel 30'; Sappleton 90'		Zola 64'	Stadium: Moss Rose; Attendance: 3,449

20 January 2010 23	Macclesfield Town	0–2	Northampton Town	Macclesfield
			Guttridge 23'; Akinfenwa 76'	Stadium: Moss Rose; Attendance: 1,035

23 January 2010 24	Port Vale	0–0	Macclesfield Town	Stoke on Trent
				Stadium: Vale Park; Attendance: 5,167

26 January 2010 25	Macclesfield Town	2–2	Morecambe	Macclesfield
	Lindfield 38'; Sappleton 83'		Drummond 52'; Haining 64'	Stadium: Moss Rose; Attendance: 1,046

6 February 2010 26	Macclesfield Town	0–1	Shrewsbury Town	Macclesfield
			Leslie 54'	Stadium: Moss Rose; Attendance: 2,058

9 February 2010 27	Bury	2–1	Macclesfield Town	Bury
	Lowe 29' (pen.); Bishop 79'		Butcher 26'	Stadium: Gigg Lane; Attendance: 2,169

13 February 2010 28	Macclesfield Town	0–0	Accrington Stanley	Macclesfield
				Stadium: Moss Rose; Attendance: 1,729

20 February 2010 29	Bournemouth	1–1	Macclesfield Town	Bournemouth
	Connell 85'		Brown 62'	Stadium: Fitness First Stadium; Attendance: 4,549

23 February 2010 30	Grimsby Town	1–1	Macclesfield Town	Grimsby
	Devitt 42'		Butcher 58'	Stadium: Blundell Park; Attendance: 4,813

27 February 2010 31	Macclesfield Town	0–1	Rochdale	Macclesfield
			O'Grady 60'	Stadium: Moss Rose; Attendance: 2,462

2 March 2010 32	Notts County	1–0	Macclesfield Town	Nottingham
	Clapham 18'			Stadium: Meadow Lane; Attendance: 4,672

6 March 2010 33	Hereford United	0–2	Macclesfield Town	Hereford
			Sappleton 16'; Sinclair 62'	Stadium: Edgar Street; Attendance: 1,919

9 March 2010 34	Accrington Stanley	1–1	Macclesfield Town	Accrington
	Kee 65'		Tipton 78' (pen.)	Stadium: Crown Ground; Attendance: 1,210

13 March 2010 35	Macclesfield Town	2–0	Bury	Macclesfield
	Wright 30'; Lindfield 57'			Stadium: Moss Rose; Attendance: 2,740

20 March 2010 36	Dagenham & Redbridge	3–1	Macclesfield Town	London
	Green 51', 87'; Ogogo 71'		Bell 33'	Stadium: Victoria Road; Attendance: 3,721

23 March 2010 37	Rotherham United	3–1	Macclesfield Town	Sheffield
	Harrison 12'; Le Fondre 81' (pen.); Broughton 83'		Wright 25'	Stadium: Don Valley Stadium; Attendance: 2,873

27 March 2010 38	Macclesfield Town	1–0	Cheltenham Town	Macclesfield
	Wright 89'			Stadium: Moss Rose; Attendance: 1,572

3 April 2010 39	Macclesfield Town	1–1	Aldershot Town	Macclesfield
	Brown 17'		Donnelly 76' (pen.)	Stadium: Moss Rose; Attendance: 1,428

6 April 2010 40	Bradford City	1–2	Macclesfield Town	Bradford
	Oliver 40'		Sinclair 40'; Wright 25'	Stadium: Coral Windows Stadium; Attendance: 11,395

10 April 2010 41	Barnet	1–2	Macclesfield Town	London
	Upson 90'		Sinclair 54'; Bell 89'	Stadium: Underhill; Attendance: 1,433

13 April 2010 42	Macclesfield Town	1–1	Burton Albion	Macclesfield
	Brown 3'		Tipton 58' (o.g.)	Stadium: Moss Rose; Attendance: 1,588

17 April 2010 43	Macclesfield Town	2–0	Chesterfield	Macclesfield
	Sinclair 32'; Mukendi 38'			Stadium: Moss Rose; Attendance: 2,143

24 April 2010 44	Torquay United	1–0	Macclesfield Town	Torquay
	Wroe 86'			Stadium: Plainmoor; Attendance: 2,570

1 May 2010 45	Macclesfield Town	0–2	Darlington	Macclesfield
			Miller 9'; Smith 79'	Stadium: Moss Rose; Attendance: 1,716

8 May 2010 46	Lincoln City	0–0	Macclesfield Town	Lincoln
				Stadium: Sincil Bank; Attendance: 3,291

=== FA Cup ===
7 November 2009 Round 1	Milton Keynes Dons	1–0	Macclesfield Town	Milton Keynes
	Gobern 25'			Stadium: Stadium MK; Attendance: 4,868

=== League Cup ===
12 August 2009 Round 1	Macclesfield Town	0–2	Leicester City	Macclesfield
			N'Guessan 58'; Fryatt 71'	Stadium: Moss Rose; Attendance: 2,197

=== Football League Trophy ===
1 September 2009 Round 2	Carlisle United	4–2	Macclesfield Town	Carlisle
	Robson 64'; Dobie 68', 80'; Bridge-Wilkinson 78'		Brisley 45'; Rooney 85'	Stadium: Brunton Park; Attendance: 1,753

== Players ==
=== First-team squad ===
Includes all players who were awarded squad numbers during the season.

Note: Flags indicate national team as defined under FIFA eligibility rules; some limited exceptions apply. Players may hold more than one non-FIFA nationality.

No.	Pos.	Nation	Player
1	GK	ENG	Jonny Brain
2	DF	ENG	Izak Reid
3	DF	ENG	Carl Tremarco
4	DF	ENG	Sean Hessey
5	DF	ENG	Nat Brown
6	DF	ENG	Paul Morgan
7	MF	ENG	Lee Bell
8	MF	ENG	Ross Draper
9	FW	ENG	Emile Sinclair
10	MF	ENG	Stephen Reed
11	FW	ENG	Ben Wright
12	FW	ENG	Kyle Wilson
13	GK	CPV	José Veiga
14	FW	ENG	John Rooney
15	MF	ENG	Paul Bolland
16	DF	ENG	Shaun Brisley

No.	Pos.	Nation	Player
17	MF	ENG	Colin Daniel
18	FW	ENG	Kristian Dennis
19	MF	ENG	Matt Lowe
20	DF	ALG	Hamza Bencherif
22	FW	JAM	Ricky Sappleton
23	DF	WAL	Matthew Tipton
24	FW	ENG	Vinny Mukendi
25	DF	ENG	Michael Thomas
26	MF	ENG	Adam Roberts
27	MF	ENG	Tom France
28	FW	ENG	Craig Lindfield
30	DF	BEL	François Kompany
31	DF	ENG	James Askey
32	DF	ENG	Adam Jukes
33	MF	ENG	Scott Beckett

=== Left club during season ===
Note: Flags indicate national team as defined under FIFA eligibility rules; some limited exceptions apply. Players may hold more than one non-FIFA nationality.

No.	Pos.	Nation	Player
22	DF	ENG	Matthew Flynn
21	MF	ENG	Tyrone Kirk

No.	Pos.	Nation	Player
29	FW	ENG	Greg Mills (on loan from Derby County)
21	MF	ENG	Richard Butcher (on loan from Lincoln City)
