= Sappleton =

Sappleton is an English surname common in Jamaica. Notable people with the surname include:

- Aldwyn Sappleton (born 1981), Jamaican track and field athlete
- Ricky Sappleton (born 1989), Jamaican footballer
- Wayne Sappleton (born 1960), Jamaican basketball player who played in the National Basketball Association
