= Jon Challinor =

English footballer (born 1980)

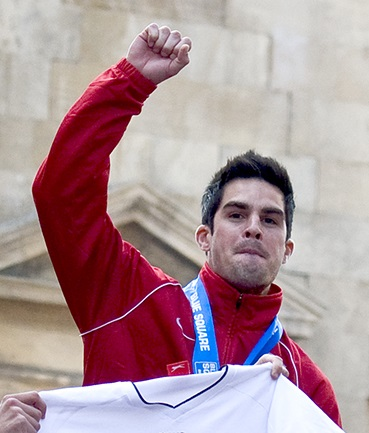
- Challinor with the parade that followed York City's victory in the 2012 Conference Premier play-off final

Personal information
- Full name: Jon Challinor
- Date of birth: 2 December 1980 (age 45)
- Place of birth: Northampton, England
- Height: 5 ft 11 in (1.80 m)
- Positions: Defender; midfielder

Team information
- Current team: Stamford (player-coach)

Youth career
- –1998: Rushden & Diamonds

Senior career*
Years	Team	Apps	(Gls)
1998–2000	Rushden & Diamonds	0	(0)
2000–2001	Stamford	14	(3)
2001–2002	Cambridge City	44	(4)
2002	Kalamazoo Kingdom		
2002–2003	St Albans City	45	(4)
2003	Kalamazoo Kingdom	17	(2)
2003–2005	Aldershot Town	73	(21)
2005–2007	Exeter City	84	(21)
2007–2008	Rushden & Diamonds	45	(5)
2008–2010	Cambridge United	35	(2)
2009	→ Forest Green Rovers (loan)	7	(0)
2009–2010	→ Mansfield Town (loan)	5	(1)
2010	Mansfield Town	15	(2)
2010	Brackley Town		
2010	Newport County	3	(0)
2011	Kettering Town	18	(1)
2011–2013	York City	58	(2)
2013–	Stamford	357	(27)
2014	→ FC Halifax Town (dual registration)	5	(0)
2020	→ Yaxley (dual registration)	1	(0)
2023–2024	→ Wisbech Town (loan)	11	(4)
2025	→ Wisbech Town (loan)	8	(1)

International career
2004	England National Game XI	1	(0)

Managerial career
- 2015: Stamford (caretaker)
- * Club domestic league appearances and goals as of 13:48, 8 November 2026 (UTC)

Jon Challinor (born 2 December 1980) is an English semi-professional footballer who plays as a defender or midfielder for Southern League Premier Division Central club Stamford, where he also serves as a coach. He has played in the Football League for York City. He is also one of the few footballers to have made over 1,000 competitive appearances.

Challinor started his career with Rushden & Diamonds, and after being released in 2000 had spells with Stamford, Cambridge City, the Kalamazoo Kingdom and St Albans City. He reached the 2004 Football Conference play-off final with Aldershot Town, and after another unsuccessful play-off campaign in the 2004–05 season signed for Exeter City in 2005. He played in the 2007 Conference National play-off final defeat before returning to Rushden in 2007. He left for Cambridge United a year later, playing for them in the 2009 Conference Premier play-off final. After spells with Forest Green Rovers, Mansfield Town, Brackley Town, Newport County and Kettering Town, Challinor signed for York City in 2011. Here, he won promotion to League Two in his fourth appearance in a Conference Premier play-off final, following victory in the 2012 final, also winning in the 2012 FA Trophy final. He was released by the club a year later.

== Early and personal life ==
Jon Challinor was born on 2 December 1980 in Northampton, Northamptonshire. He married in May 2024.

== Club career ==
=== Early career ===
Challinor began his career in the youth system at Rushden & Diamonds. He made his first-team debut for the Football Conference club as an 18-year-old in a Conference League Cup match against Farnborough Town on 22 December 1998. He signed a contract at the end of his scholarship, but after failing to break into the first-team squad was released in May 2000. Challinor dropped two divisions to join Southern League Division One East club Stamford in search of first-team football. He impressed with Stamford, moving to Southern League Premier Division club Cambridge City in February 2001, scoring two goals in 11 league appearances before the end of the 2000–01 season. He made 46 appearances, scoring three goals, in the 2001–02 season before spending the close season with the Kalamazoo Kingdom in the American USL Premier Development League.

Challinor returned to England after joining Isthmian League Premier Division club St Albans City on a two-year contract in August 2002. His debut came in St Albans' 4–0 victory away to Ware in the Herts Charity Cup first round on 3 August, before scoring his first goal in a 2–0 home win against Heybridge Swifts on 26 August. Challinor played in St Albans' 4–1 FA Cup first-round defeat to Second Division team Stockport County on 16 November. He scored six goals in 57 appearances in the 2002–03 season, before spending a second close season with the Kalamazoo Kingdom, making 17 appearances and scoring two goals in the USL Premier Development League.

=== Aldershot Town ===
After being released by St Albans, Challinor signed for Football Conference club Aldershot Town on 8 August 2003, having appeared for them in pre-season. He made his debut in a 2–1 home win over Accrington Stanley on 10 August, before scoring his first goal in a 5–2 win away to Telford United on 16 August. Having made an impressive start for Aldershot, scoring five goals in 12 appearances, Challinor signed a contract lasting until the end of the 2004–05 season on 14 October. He was handed a three-match suspension after being given a red card in a 2–0 home defeat to Margate on 20 December, making his return in a 4–0 defeat away to Farnborough on 24 January 2004. He played in the 2004 Football Conference play-off final against Shrewsbury Town at the Britannia Stadium, which Aldershot lost 3–0 in a penalty shoot-out after a 1–1 draw following extra time. His 2003–04 season with Aldershot finished having scored 13 goals in 48 appearances.

Aldershot qualified for the play-offs again in the 2004–05 season, and Challinor played in both semi-final matches against Carlisle United, which ended in a 2–2 draw on aggregate. Challinor missed his penalty kick in the penalty shoot-out, before Danny Livesey scored the penalty that secured Carlisle's place in the play-off final. Having finished the season with nine goals in 44 appearances, Challinor was released by Aldershot on 18 May 2005, despite being rated as one of the best attacking midfielders in the Conference National.

=== Exeter City ===
On 20 May 2005, Challinor joined Conference National club Exeter City on a two-year contract. Manager Alex Inglethorpe described him by saying "He's 24 years of age and he fits the bill of the type of player that will help us next season. I liken him to Tim Cahill of Everton. He likes to get forward and score goals, and has a good grounding in both League and non-League football." Challinor made his debut in a 2–0 win away to Gravesend & Northfleet on 13 August, before scoring his first goal on 3 September in a 2–2 away to Dagenham & Redbridge. He scored in a 4–0 win over former club Aldershot on 26 December, during which he was targeted by opposition fans, after his former manager Terry Brown claimed he left Aldershot for financial reasons. After the match, Challinor said "I got one over on the manager and proved him wrong, he didn't think I was good enough. Their fans were at me throughout the game but it only made me focus more." He finished the 2005–06 season with 13 goals in 49 appearances for Exeter.

Challinor was targeted by fellow Conference National club Grays Athletic in December 2006, but after remaining at Exeter he was offered a new contract at the club in February 2007, which he did not sign. He played for Exeter in the 2007 Conference National play-off final on 20 May 2007, the first Conference play-off final to be played at the newly rebuilt Wembley Stadium. He assisted Lee Phillips' ninth-minute opening goal for Exeter, although the team went on to lose 2–1 to Morecambe. Challinor made 48 appearances and scored 10 goals for Exeter in the 2006–07 season.

=== Return to Rushden & Diamonds ===
Challinor returned to Conference Premier club Rushden & Diamonds after signing a two-year contract on 28 May 2007. He made his debut in a 1–1 draw away to Woking on 11 August, before scoring his first goal in a 1–1 draw away to Salisbury City on 8 September. He started the season playing in midfield, but when being played as a striker in late February 2008 he went on a run of scoring six goals in five consecutive matches.

He appeared for Rushden in the 2008 Conference League Cup final against Aldershot at the Recreation Ground on 3 April 2008. The match finished a 3–3 draw after extra time, but Aldershot won 4–3 in a penalty shoot-out. Challinor made 60 appearances and scored 11 goals for Rushden in the 2007–08 season, only missing out on ever-present status after missing the last match of the season against Grays Athletic through injury.

=== Cambridge United and Mansfield Town ===
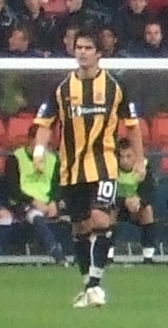
Challinor playing for Cambridge United in 2008

Challinor joined Conference Premier rivals Cambridge United on a two-year contract for a £15,000 fee on 6 August 2008. His debut came in a 1–0 win away to Northwich Victoria on 9 August, and scored his first goal with the winner in the first minute of stoppage time of a 1–0 home win over Lewes on 7 October. Soon after he was told by manager Gary Brabin to provide more support for the team's strikers, with Challinor agreeing, saying "It will put the added responsibility on me to start shooting and take some pressure off the forwards. If the midfield can get some goals as well, then that will help the team". He immediately followed this up with the winning goal against Weymouth in a 1–0 home win on 11 October, coming from a low right-footed shot into the corner from 25 yards.

Challinor's first sending off for Cambridge came after receiving a second yellow card during a 5–0 home defeat to Crawley Town in the FA Trophy second round on 14 January 2009. He made his return from suspension in a 1–1 home draw with Oxford United on 29 January. Challinor came on as a 79th-minute substitute for Paul Carden in the 2009 Conference Premier play-off final at Wembley Stadium, in which Torquay United won 2–0. Having struggled to make an impact for Cambridge in the 2008–09 season, which he finished with two goals in 39 appearances, he was transfer listed.

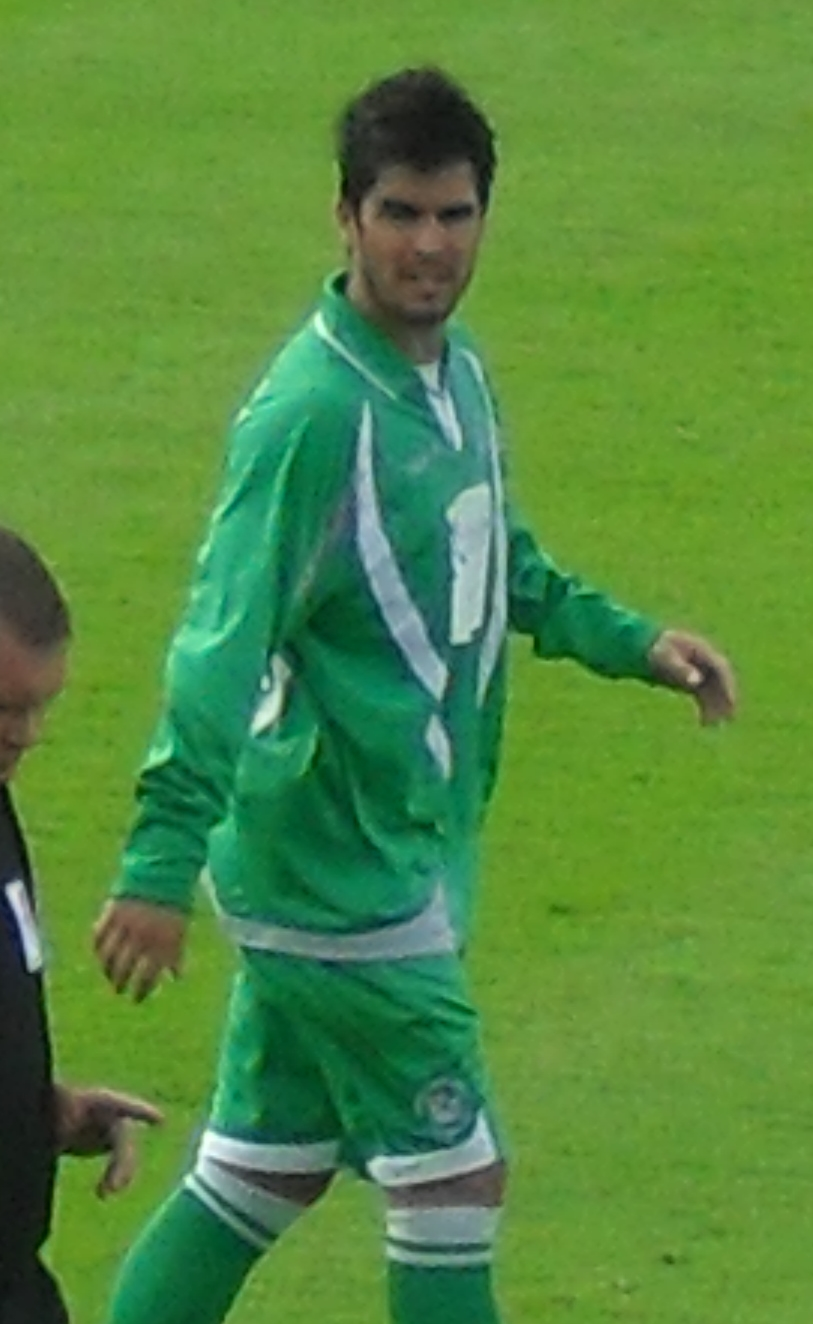
Challinor playing for Forest Green Rovers in 2009

He was sent out on loan to Cambridge's divisional rivals Forest Green Rovers for one month on 7 August 2009. Challinor made his debut the following day in a 2–1 home defeat against Kettering Town, going on to make seven appearances at Forest Green. Forest Green had been interested in taking Challinor on another loan, until appointing a new manager. He left Cambridge on loan again after joining Conference Premier rivals Mansfield Town on a two-month loan on 20 November. Challinor made a scoring debut for Mansfield with the equalising goal from close range in a 1–1 draw at home to Eastbourne Borough on 21 November. After making six appearances and scoring one goal in his loan spell, Challinor signed permanently for Mansfield for the rest of the season on 6 January 2010. He was released by Mansfield at the end of the 2009–10 season, having made 15 appearances and scored two goals after signing permanently.

=== Brackley Town, Newport County and Kettering Town ===
Challinor signed with Southern League Premier Division club Brackley Town in July 2010, after he had been set to sign for Corby Town of the Conference North, with whom he had been on trial. He then signed for Conference Premier club Newport County on a short-term contract on 30 October, making his debut later that day as a 28th-minute substitute for Martin John in a 2–1 home defeat to Kettering Town, but was himself substituted in the 73rd minute for Robbie Matthews. Challinor scored on his next appearance for Newport, with the winning goal after netting Sam Deering's cross in the 29th minute of extra time in a 1–0 victory away to Wealdstone in an FA Trophy first-round replay on 13 December. He was released by Newport on 30 December, having made four appearances and scored one goal for the club.

He joined Conference Premier club Kettering Town on a contract until the end of the 2010–11 season on 18 January 2011. Kettering were fighting against relegation, and Challinor was quoted as saying "We have to stay positive. We know it's a transitional period for the club and there is a lot going on". He made his debut later that day as a half-time substitute for Callum Wilson in Kettering's 2–1 loss away to Grimsby Town. His first goal for Kettering came in stoppage time against Southport in a 3–1 home victory on 30 April, having entered the match in the 89th minute. Challinor finished the season with 14 appearances and one goal for Kettering. He agreed to stay at Kettering ahead of the 2011–12 season on non-contract terms, in the belief that a permanent contract would later be agreed, and started the season playing as a defensive midfielder.

=== York City ===
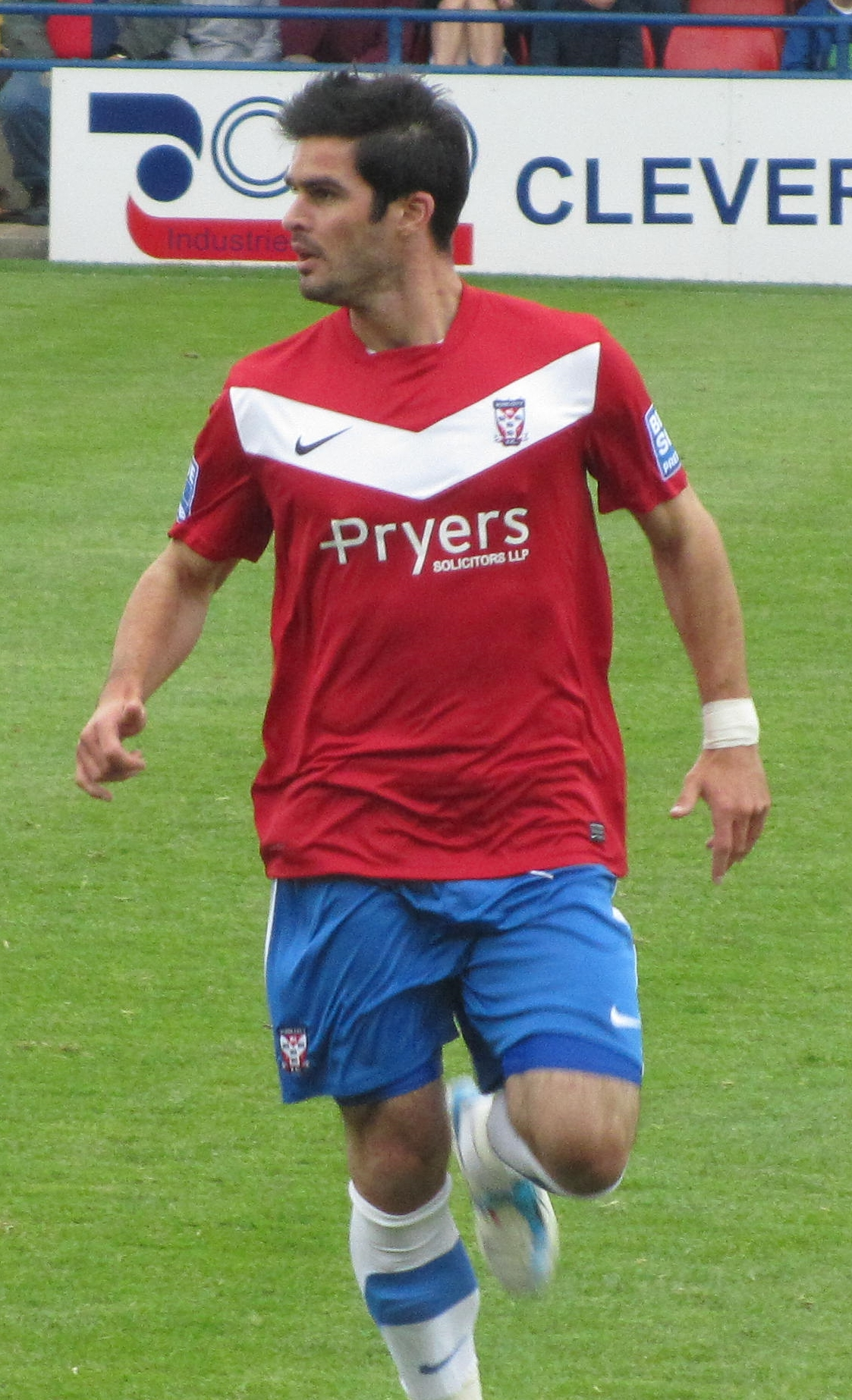
Challinor playing for York City in 2011

On 25 August 2011, Challinor signed for Kettering's Conference Premier rivals York City on a contract until January 2012, having impressed manager Gary Mills when playing against York for Kettering two days earlier. He made his debut a day later, coming on as a 56th-minute substitute for Paddy McLaughlin in a 0–0 draw away to Fleetwood Town. Challinor was soon converted into a right-back at York, a position in which he displayed composure and an ability to start attacking moves. His first goal for York came in a 4–2 win away to Hayes & Yeading United on 22 October with a drilled shot into the bottom right corner of the goal from the edge of the penalty area.

He signed a new contract with York until the end of the 2011–12 season in January 2012. He featured in the York team that won 2–0 in the 2012 FA Trophy final at Wembley Stadium against his former club Newport on 12 May. Eight days later he again played at Wembley Stadium to win promotion to League Two through the 2012 Conference Premier play-off final with a 2–1 victory over Luton Town. Thus, Challinor was successful in achieving promotion to the Football League in his fourth appearance in a Conference Premier play-off final. Having made 51 appearances and scored three goals for York in the 2011–12 season, he signed a new one-year contract with the club in July.

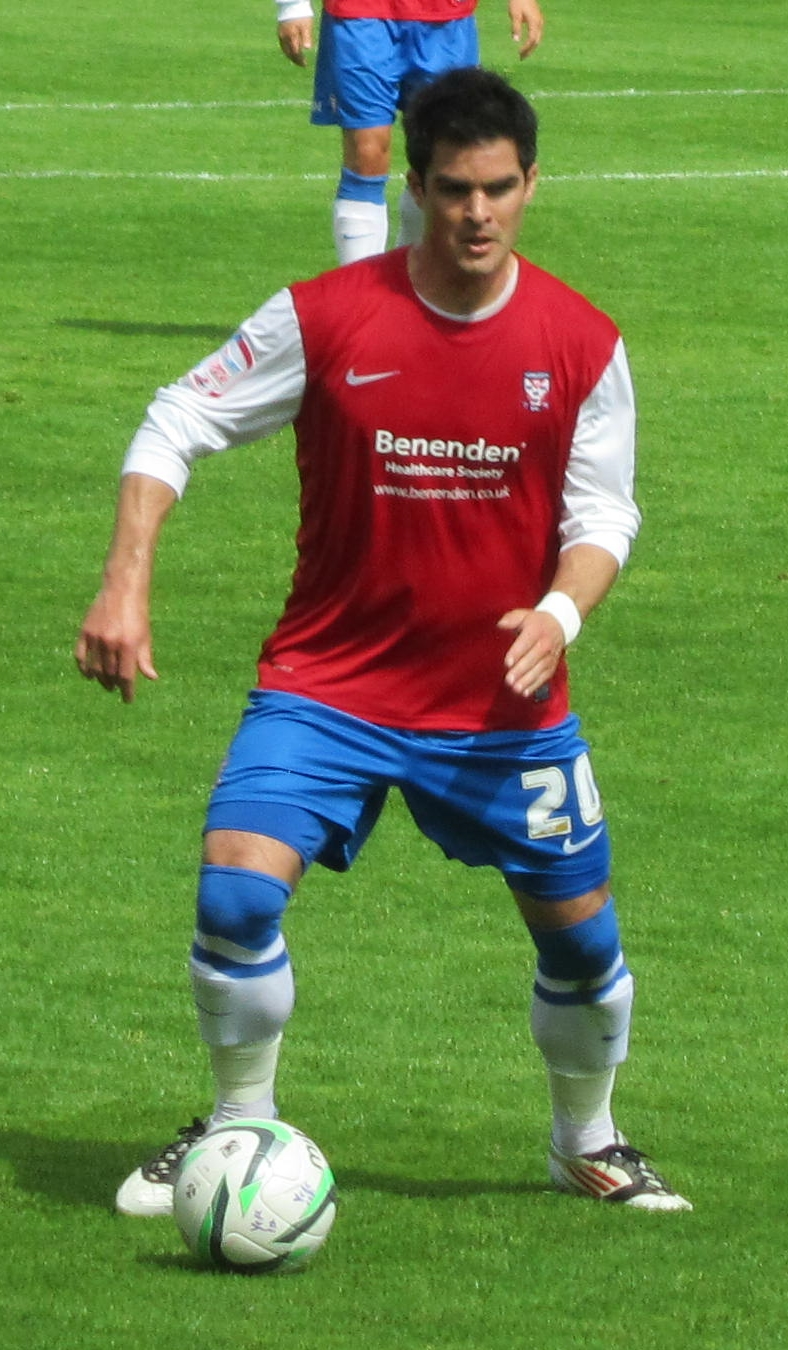
Challinor playing for York City in 2012

Ahead of Challinor's first season as a Football League player, he was quoted as saying "It's been a long time coming so I'm going to embrace it and enjoy every minute. I think almost every team I have played for has gone on to reach the League so to finally achieve it is a dream come true but it doesn't end there". He made his first appearance as a League player in a League Cup first-round match away to Doncaster Rovers on 11 August 2012 as an 87th-minute substitute for McLaughlin. York lost 4–2 in a penalty shoot-out after a 1–1 draw after extra time, although Challinor was successful in converting his penalty. He finished the 2012–13 season with 22 appearances before being released by York.

=== Return to Stamford ===
Challinor re-signed for Stamford in August 2013, after playing for the Northern Premier League Premier Division club during pre-season. After impressive performances throughout December, which culminated in him being named Stamford's Player of the Month, Challinor signed a dual registration deal with Conference Premier team FC Halifax Town on 7 January 2014. He made his debut in a 0–0 draw away to Wrexham on 11 January. Challinor made five appearances for Halifax before resuming playing for Stamford in February. He played in the final of the Lincolnshire Senior Shield as Stamford beat Brigg Town 5–4 in a penalty shoot-out following a 3–3 draw after extra time on 29 April. Challinor took over as caretaker manager of Stamford on 5 November 2015, following the dismissal of Andrew Wilson. He remained in charge until the appointment of Graham Drury as manager on 12 November. He had made 30 appearances and scored two goals in all competitions by the time the 2019–20 season was abandoned because of the COVID-19 pandemic in England.

In February 2020, Challinor joined Yaxley on dual registration; he appeared once for the club, in a 1–1 draw with Wantage Town on 11 February in a Southern League Division One Central match. He was part of the Stamford team that won the 2022–23 Northern Premier League Division One Midlands title, earning promotion to the Southern League Premier Division Central. He made 25 appearances and scored four goals in all competitions that season. Challinor joined United Counties League Premier Division North club Wisbech Town in November 2023 on loan and made 11 appearances, scoring four goals, in the 2023–24 season. He rejoined the club on loan in January 2025, making eight appearances and scoring one goal in the 2024–25 season.

He left Stamford in May 2026, but some days later, in June, returned to the club in a player-coach role under new manager Ant Fenton.

== International career ==
Challinor was capped once by the England National Game XI, which represents England at non-League level, making his only appearance on 11 February 2004 against Italy.

In addition, he has made appearances for England's veterans national team.

== Career statistics ==
As of match played 7 November 2026

Appearances and goals by club, season and competition
Club	Season	League			FA Cup		League Cup		Other		Total	
Club	Season	Division	Apps	Goals	Apps	Goals	Apps	Goals	Apps	Goals	Apps	Goals
Rushden & Diamonds	1998–99	Football Conference	0	0	0	0	—		1 (Note: Appearance in Conference League Cup)	0	1	0
Rushden & Diamonds	1999–2000	Football Conference	0	0	0	0	—		1 (Note: Appearance in Northamptonshire Senior Cup)	0	1	0
Rushden & Diamonds	Total		0	0	0	0	—		2	0	2	0
Stamford	2000–01	Southern League Eastern Division	14	3	2	1	—		3 (Note: Two appearances in FA Trophy, one appearance in Southern League Cup)	0	19	4
Cambridge City	2000–01	Southern League Premier Division	11	2	—		—		—		11	2
Cambridge City	2001–02	Southern League Premier Division	33	2	5	0	—		8 (Note: One appearance in Southern League Cup, four appearances and one goal in FA Trophy, three appearances in Cambridgeshire Invitation Cup)	1	46	3
Cambridge City	Total		44	4	5	0	—		8	1	57	5
St Albans City	2002–03	Isthmian League Premier Division	45	4	4	0	—		8 (Note: One appearance in Herts Charity Cup, three appearances and one goal in Herts Senior Cup, one appearance in FA Trophy, three appearances and one goal in Isthmian League Cup)	2	57	6
Kalamazoo Kingdom	2003	USL Premier Development League	17	2	—		—		—		17	2
Aldershot Town	2003–04	Football Conference	36	12	3	0	—		9 (Note: Six appearances and one goal in FA Trophy, three appearances in Football Conference play-offs)	1	48	13
Aldershot Town	2004–05	Conference National	37	9	3	0	—		4 (Note: One appearance in Football League Trophy, one appearance in FA Trophy, two appearances in Conference National play-offs)	0	44	9
Aldershot Town	Total		73	21	6	0	—		13	1	92	22
Exeter City	2005–06	Conference National	42	12	1	0	—		6 (Note: Appearance(s) in FA Trophy)	1	49	13
Exeter City	2006–07	Conference National	42	9	2	1	—		4 (Note: One appearance in FA Trophy, three appearances in Conference National play-offs)	0	48	10
Exeter City	Total		84	21	3	1	—		10	1	97	23
Rushden & Diamonds	2007–08	Conference Premier	45	5	3	1	—		12 (Note: One appearance in Northamptonshire Cup, two appearances and one goal in Northamptonshire Senior Cup, four appearances in FA Trophy, five appearances and four goals in Conference League Cup)	5	60	11
Rushden & Diamonds	2008–09	Conference Premier	—		—		—		1 (Note: Appearance in Northamptonshire Cup)	1	1	1
Rushden & Diamonds	Total		45	5	3	1	—		13	6	61	12
Cambridge United	2008–09	Conference Premier	33	2	2	0	—		4 (Note: Two appearances in FA Trophy, two appearances in Conference Premier play-offs)	0	39	2
Cambridge United	2009–10	Conference Premier	2	0	1	0	—		—		3	0
Cambridge United	Total		35	2	3	0	—		4	0	42	2
Forest Green Rovers (loan)	2009–10	Conference Premier	7	0	—		—		—		7	0
Mansfield Town	2009–10	Conference Premier	20	3	—		—		1	0	21	3
Newport County	2010–11	Conference Premier	3	0	—		—		1	1	4	1
Kettering Town	2010–11	Conference Premier	14	1	—		—		—		14	1
Kettering Town	2011–12	Conference Premier	4	0	—		—		—		4	0
Kettering Town	Total		18	1	—		—		—		18	1
York City	2011–12	Conference Premier	39	2	1	0	—		11 (Note: Eight appearances and one goal in FA Trophy, three appearances in Conference Premier play-offs)	1	51	3
York City	2012–13	League Two	19	0	0	0	1	0	2 (Note: Appearances in Football League Trophy)	0	22	0
York City	Total		58	2	1	0	1	0	13	1	73	3
Stamford	2013–14	Northern Premier League; Premier Division	35	4	4	1	—		4 (Note: One appearance in FA Trophy, two appearances in Northern Premier League Challenge Cup, one appearance in Lincolnshire Senior Shield)	0	43	5
Stamford	2014–15	Northern Premier League; Premier Division	46	3	2	0	—		5 (Note: One appearance in FA Trophy, one appearance in Northern Premier League Challenge Cup, three appearances in Lincolnshire Senior Shield)	0	53	3
Stamford	2015–16	Northern Premier League; Premier Division	37	0	3	0	—		5 (Note: Two appearances and one goal in Lincolnshire Senior Shield, one appearance in FA Trophy, two appearances in Northern Premier League Challenge Cup)	1	45	1
Stamford	2016–17	Northern Premier League; Division One South	27	2	3	0	—		4 (Note: Two appearances in FA Trophy, one appearance in Lincolnshire Senior Shield, one appearance in Northern Premier League Challenge Cup)	0	34	2
Stamford	2017–18	Northern Premier League; Division One South	33	2	0	0	—		6 (Note: Two appearances in FA Trophy, two appearances in Northern Premier League Challenge Cup, two appearances in Northern Premier League Division One South play-offs)	0	39	2
Stamford	2018–19	Northern Premier League; Division One East	36	5	2	0	—		12 (Note: Four appearances and one goal in Lincolnshire Senior Cup, one appearance in Northern Premier League Challenge Cup, seven appearances and one goal in FA Trophy)	2	50	7
Stamford	2019–20	Northern Premier League; Division One South East	23	1	3	0	—		4 (Note: One appearance in Lincolnshire Senior Cup, three appearances and one goal in FA Trophy)	1	30	2
Stamford	2020–21	Northern Premier League; Division One South East	4	1	3	1	—		2	1	9	3
Stamford	2021–22	Northern Premier League; Division One Midlands	14	3	6	0	—		0	0	20	3
Stamford	2022–23	Northern Premier League; Division One Midlands	23	3	1	0	—		1	1	25	4
Stamford	2023–24	Southern League; Premier Division Central	17	1	0	0	—		2 (Note: One appearance in South Kesteven Charity Cup, one appearance in Lincolnshire Senior Cup)	0	19	1
Stamford	2024–25	Southern League; Premier Division Central	25	2	1	0	—		4 (Note: Three appearances in Lincolnshire Senior Cup, one appearance in FA Trophy)	0	30	2
Stamford	2025–26	Southern League; Premier Division Central	24	0	2	1	—		1	0	27	1
Stamford	2026–27	Southern League; Premier Division Central	13	0	0	0	—		0	0	13	0
Stamford	Total		357	27	30	3	0	0	50	6	437	36
FC Halifax Town (dual registration)	2013–14	Conference Premier	5	0	—		—		—		5	0
Yaxley (dual registration)	2019–20	Southern League; Division One Central	1	0	—		—		—		1	0
Wisbech Town (loan)	2023–24	United Counties League; Premier Division North	11	4	—		—		—		11	4
Wisbech Town (loan)	2024–25	United Counties League; Premier Division North	8	1	—		—		—		8	1
Wisbech Town (loan)	Total		19	5	—		—		—		19	5
Career total			845	100	57	6	1	0	126	19	1,029	125

== Managerial statistics ==
As of 12 November 2015

Managerial record by team and tenure
Team	From	To	Record				
Team	From	To	P	W	D	L	Win %
Stamford (caretaker)	5 November 2015	12 November 2015	2	1	0	1	50.0
Career total			2	1	0	1	50.0

== Honours ==
York City

- FA Trophy: 2011–12
- Conference Premier play-offs: 2012

Stamford

- Lincolnshire Senior Shield: 2013–14, 2014–15
- Northern Premier League Division One Midlands: 2022–23

== See also ==
- List of men's footballers with 1,000 or more official appearances
