= Ian Ross (footballer, born 1986) =

English footballer

Personal information
- Date of birth: 13 January 1986 (age 40)
- Place of birth: Sheffield, England
- Position: Central midfielder

Team information
- Current team: Belper Town

Youth career
- Sheffield United

Senior career*
Years	Team	Apps	(Gls)
2003–2008	Sheffield United	0	(0)
2005	→ Boston United (loan)	14	(4)
2006	→ Bury (loan)	7	(0)
2006–2007	→ Notts County (loan)	25	(1)
2007	→ Notts County (loan)	11	(0)
2007–2008	→ Rotherham United (loan)	5	(0)
2008	Rotherham United	12	(0)
2008–2009	Gainsborough Trinity	19	(2)
2009–2011	Alfreton Town	73	(10)
2011	Harrogate Town	12	(0)
2011–2014	Boston United	96	(12)
2014–	Belper Town		

International career
2002	England U17	8	(1)
- * Club domestic league appearances and goals as of 12:00, 15 August 2014 (UTC)

Ian Ross (born 13 January 1986 in Sheffield) is an English footballer who plays for Belper Town.

== Playing career ==
=== Sheffield United ===
Ross started his career as a trainee with Sheffield United. His "Blades" career was limited to just two League Cup games, the first of which was against Boston United in which he scored the winning goal. He had loan spells with Boston United and Bury during the 2005–06 season. Whilst at Boston he was named League Two's Player of the Month for October.

In July 2006, he joined Notts County on a six-month loan deal, which saw him play 31 games and scored one goal. After returning to Bramall Lane in January, the two clubs agreed a new loan deal until the end of the season.

=== Rotherham United ===
On 7 November 2007, he signed a loan deal at League Two side Rotherham United, he then joined permanently until the end of the season in January. Ross was released after his short-team deal at the Millers expired, along with five other players.

=== Non-League ===
Ross signed for Gainsborough Trinity, after a trial period in which he scored in the last minute 2–1 win over Chesterfield on 19 July 2008. On 20 March 2009, Ross was signed by Alfreton Town manager Nicky Law.

On 16 May 2011, Ross signed for Harrogate Town. He rejoined Boston United in November 2011, signing new contracts with the club in 2012 and 2013. He began the 2014–15 season with Belper Town.

== International career ==
Ross made eight appearances for the England under-17 side in 2002, scoring once, playing in the Nordic Cup.

== Career statistics ==
Appearances and goals by club, season and competition
Club	Season	League			FA Cup		League Cup		Other		Total	
Club	Season	Division	Apps	Goals	Apps	Goals	Apps	Goals	Apps	Goals	Apps	Goals
Sheffield United	2005–06	Championship	0	0	0	0	2	1	—		2	1
Sheffield United	2006–07	Premier League	0	0	0	0	0	0	—		0	0
Sheffield United	2007–08	Championship	0	0	0	0	0	0	—		0	0
Sheffield United	Total		0	0	0	0	2	1	—		2	1
Boston United (loan)	2005–06	League Two	14	4	0	0	0	0	2 (Note: Appearance(s) in Football League Trophy)	0	16	4
Bury (loan)	2005–06	League Two	7	0	0	0	0	0	0	0	7	0
Notts County (loan)	2006–07	League Two	36	1	1	0	4	0	1	0	42	1
Rotherham United	2007–08 (Note: Part of this season was spent on loan from Sheffield United)	League Two	17	0	0	0	0	0	0	0	17	0
Gainsborough Trinity	2008–09	Conference North	19	2	1	0	—		1 (Note: Appearance(s) in Conference League Cup)	0	21	2
Alfreton Town	2008–09	Conference North	10	3	0	0	—		2 (Note: Appearance(s) in Conference North play-offs)	0	12	3
Alfreton Town	2009–10	Conference North	37	4	3	0	—		6 (Note: Three appearances one goal in Conference North play-offs; two appearances in Derbyshire Senior Cup; one appearance in FA Trophy)	1	46	5
Alfreton Town	2010–11	Conference North	26	3	2	0	—		8 (Note: Six appearances in FA Trophy; two appearances in Derbyshire Senior Cup)	0	36	3
Alfreton Town	Total		73	10	5	0	—		16	1	94	11
Harrogate Town	2011–12	Conference North	12	0	2	0	—		0	0	14	0
Boston United	2011–12	Conference North	23	4	0	0	—		3 (Note: Appearance(s) in FA Trophy)	0	26	4
Boston United	2012–13	Conference North	39	4	3	0	—		6 (Note: Three appearances in FA Trophy; three appearances in Lincolnshire Senior Shield)	0	48	4
Boston United	2013–14	Conference North	34	4	1	0	—		4 (Note: Three appearances in FA Trophy; one appearance in Lincolnshire Senior Cup)	0	39	4
Boston United	Total		96	12	4	0	—		13	0	113	12
Career total			274	29	13	0	6	1	33	1	326	31
