= Tyrone Kirk =

English footballer

Personal information
- Date of birth: 2 January 1984 (age 42)
- Place of birth: Scunthorpe, England
- Position: Midfielder

Senior career*
Years	Team	Apps	(Gls)
2007–2009	Stamford	65	(7)
2009–2010	Macclesfield Town	0	(0)
2009–2010	→ Rhyl (loan)	14	(1)
2010	Rhyl	13	(2)
2010–2011	Corby Town	1	(0)
2010–2011	Brigg Town	0	(0)
2010–2011	Grantham Town	2	(0)
2011–2012	Boston United	0	(0)
- * Club domestic league appearances and goals as of 22:29, 16 September 2010 (UTC) ‡ National team caps and goals as of 20:20, 27 August 2008 (UTC)

Tyrone Charles Kirk (born 2 January 1984, in Scunthorpe) is an English footballer.

== Career ==
Kirk started his career as a youth at his hometown team Scunthorpe United and was the 2003 winner of the Nike Freestyle Soccer awards. He moved to Northern Premier League side Stamford in August 2007, having impressed playing against the club while on trial at Boston United, and quickly confirmed himself as a fans favourite with his trickery and pace. Whilst at Stamford he won the Lincolnshire Senior Shield in 2008. At the end of the 2008–09 season presentations, he won the Most Man of the Matches Award, Supporters Player and the Arthur Twiddy Memorial Shield.

Kirk left the Vic Couzens Stadium at the end of the 2008–09 season to pursue opportunities in higher grade football and had looked set to sign for Boston United but the Pilgrims agreed to give the player until 8 August to find himself a full-time club. He spent time on trial with Sheffield United but failed to win a place with the Blades but, after performing well in matches against Huddersfield Town and Northwich Victoria, he was signed for Football League Two side Macclesfield Town. He made his Macclesfield Town debut in a 2–0 defeat against Leicester City in the first round of the Football League Cup on 12 August 2009.

In August 2009, Kirk joined Welsh Premier League side Rhyl on loan to gain first team experience, making his debut in a 2–0 win over Port Talbot Town. He made his loan move permanent on 1 January 2010 for a nominal fee. Kirk left Rhyl at the end of the season due to the financial situation at the club. He spent time on trial at Scottish Premier League side St Johnstone but, having not played a competitive fixture for several months, he began training with his old club Stamford to maintain fitness until he joins a club, later joining Corby Town.

He joined Boston United, leaving the club in March 2012.
