= 2014 Football League Trophy final =

2014 Football League Trophy Final
- Event: 2013–14 Football League Trophy
Chesterfield	Peterborough United
1	3
- Date: 30 March 2014
- Venue: Wembley Stadium, London
- Referee: Andy D'Urso (Essex County)
- Attendance: 35,663

The 2014 Football League Trophy Final was the 31st final of the domestic cup involving League One and League Two teams. The final took place at Wembley Stadium in London on 30 March 2014 and saw Peterborough United beat Chesterfield 3–1, with Josh McQuoid, Shaun Brisley, Eoin Doyle and Britt Assombalonga all scoring goals. 35,663 spectators attended the match and Andy D'Urso was the referee.

== Match ==
30 March 2014
14:00 BST

Chesterfield	1–3	Peterborough United
Doyle 53'	Report	McQuoid 7'; Brisley 38'; Assombalonga 78' (pen.)

Wembley Stadium, London
Attendance: 35,663
Referee: Andy D'Urso (Essex County)

Chesterfield	Peterborough United

GK	1	(England) Tommy Lee
RB	7	(England) Tendayi Darikwa	(yellow card) 77'
CB	15	(England) Ritchie Humphreys	(yellow card) 63'
CB	6	(Scotland) Liam Cooper	(yellow card) 89'
LB	23	(England) Ian Evatt
CM	12	(Republic of Ireland) Jimmy Ryan
CM	5	(Egypt) Samy Morsy
AM	10	(Republic of Ireland) Jay O'Shea	(substituted off) 72'
AM	2	(England) Ollie Banks	(substituted off) 12'
AM	11	(England) Gary Roberts	(yellow card) 70'
ST	17	(Republic of Ireland) Eoin Doyle
Substitutes:
GK	35	(England) Ian Dunbavin
DF	4	(England) Sam Hird		(substituted on) 12' (substituted off) 79'
DF	25	(England) Drew Talbot
ST	9	(England) Marc Richards		(substituted on) 79'
ST	30	(England) Mason Bennett		(substituted on) 72'
Manager:
(England) Paul Cook

GK	1	(Austria) Bobby Olejnik
RB	31	(England) Mark Little
CB	6	(England) Michael Bostwick
CB	4	(England) Shaun Brisley	(substituted off) 72'
LB	20	(England) Nathaniel Knight-Percival
RM	36	(Northern Ireland) Josh McQuoid	(substituted off) 83'
CM	11	(Northern Ireland) Grant McCann	(substituted off) 67'
CM	14	(England) Tommy Rowe
LM	17	(England) Joe Newell	(red card) 68'
AM	7	(Scotland) Danny Swanson	(yellow card) 90'
ST	9	(Democratic Republic of the Congo) Britt Assombalonga
Substitutes
GK	13	(England) Joe Day
DF	2	(England) Craig Alcock		(substituted on) 72'
DF	3	(South Africa) Kgosietsile Ntlhe
MF	8	(England) Jack Payne		(substituted on) 67'
MF	37	(Wales) Lloyd Isgrove		(substituted on) 83'
Manager
(Scotland) Darren Ferguson

=== Statistics ===
Statistic	Chesterfield	Peterborough
Possession	52%	48%
Shots (on target)	11 (5)	11 (6)
Corners	5	7
Fouls	10	14
