= Ben Wright (footballer, born 1980) =

English footballer and coach

Personal information
- Full name: Benjamin Wright
- Date of birth: 1 July 1980 (age 46)
- Place of birth: Münster, West Germany
- Height: 6 ft 4 in (1.93 m)
- Position: Forward

Youth career
- Deeping Rangers

Senior career*
Years	Team	Apps	(Gls)
1998–1999	Kettering Town	11	(0)
1998–2001	Bristol City	2	(0)
2000–2001	→ Woking (loan)	3	(0)
2001–2002	Viking	48	(7)
2003–2007	IK Start	68	(29)
2006	→ Moss FK (loan)	11	(2)
2007–2009	Lincoln City	67	(17)
2009–2010	Macclesfield Town	39	(6)
2011	Richmond Athletic	16	(26)
2012–2018	Nelson Suburbs		
2018-2018	Tasman United		
- * Club domestic league appearances and goals as of 3 March 2025

Benjamin "Ben" Wright (born 1 July 1980) is an English former footballer who played as a forward.

== Club career ==
Wright spent the first 13 years of his life in Münster, Germany, where his father had a teaching job within the British Army before the family returned to the United Kingdom, settling in Lincolnshire. He began his career in the youth system at Deeping Rangers and was also part of the Deepings School team which won the Lincolnshire Schools County Cup in 1999. He was soon snapped up by local Football Conference side Kettering Town and began to attract scouts from the Football League, appearing twice for Leeds United in the FA Premier Academy Under-19 League before joining Bristol City for £30,000 in March 1999.

He spent the majority of his time at Bristol City in first the youth team and then the reserves. He found first-team opportunities hard to come by, though he did spend a week on trial with Bolton Wanderers and a month on loan with Woking.

In April 2001 Wright linked up with his former manager Benny Lennartsson at Norwegian club Viking. He spent two seasons with Viking and attracted attention when he came on as a substitute and scored a 90th-minute header against Chelsea in a UEFA Cup first round, first leg, match at Stamford Bridge in September 2002. Though Viking lost the game 2–1, it was a vital away goal and put pressure on Chelsea for the away leg which they subsequently lost 4–2.

For the 2003 Norwegian season, he linked up with IK Start and went on to spend five seasons with the club, finishing as the club's leading goalscorer when they won the First Division title and promotion to the Tippeligaen in 2004. In September 2005 he suffered a broken left leg in training, an injury that kept him out of much of the 2005 and 2006 seasons. Recovering fitness, he spent the remainder of the 2006 season on loan to the Norwegian championship side Moss FK.

In the summer of 2007 he elected to return to England and trialled with Barnet. He was spotted by the Lincoln City management and turned down a contract offer from Barnet to join Lincoln at the beginning of August 2007. He ended the season as top goal scorer for Lincoln, netting 15 league goals. He was released on 5 May 2009, and on 18 May it was announced that he had signed for Macclesfield Town on a one-year deal. He was released by the club, with 10 other players, at the end of the 2009–10 season. Wright signed for New Zealand side Richmond Athletic for the 2011 season. He moved on to join Nelson Suburbs for the 2012 season, acting as player and co-coach.
