= Stamford A.F.C. =

Association football club in England

Coordinates: 52°39′56″N 0°28′8″W

Stamford
- Full name: Stamford Association Football Club Limited
- Nickname: The Daniels
- Founded: 1896; 130 years ago
- Ground: Zeeco Stadium, Stamford
- Capacity: 2,000 (250 seated)
- Chairman: Vacant
- Manager: Anthony Fenton
- League: Southern League Premier Division Central
- 2025–26: Southern League Premier Division Central, 17th of 22
Home colours	Away colours

Stamford Association Football Club is an English association football club based in Stamford, Lincolnshire. They currently compete in the Southern League Premier Division Central.

== History ==
The club was established in 1896 and spent a single season in the East Midlands League. After several years without league football, the club joined the Northamptonshire League in 1909, and won the title in 1911–12. In 1933, the league was renamed the United Counties League. The club came to be known as "The Daniels" after Daniel Lambert, often cited as England's heaviest ever man, a Leicester resident who died in Stamford and is buried in the town.

They left the league in 1939, but after a season in the Peterborough & District League, they rejoined the UCL in 1946. They won the league's Knockout Cup in 1952, a season in which they also won the Lincolnshire Senior B Cup. In 1955, they left the league again to join the Central Alliance, before joining the Midland League. In 1972, they returned to the UCL. They were champions in 1975–76 as well as winning the league cup and reaching the final of the FA Vase, where they lost 1–0 to Billericay Town after extra time. They won the league again in 1977–78 and the Lincolnshire Senior A Cup in 1978–79. They then went on to win the league three consecutive seasons (1979–80 - 1981–82), as well as the Knockout Cup in 1979–80 and 1981–82 and the FA Vase in 1979–80, when Guisborough Town were defeated 2–0 in the final. In 1983–84, they reached the final for a third time, but lost 3–2 to Stansted.

After the winning the UCL Premier Division title again in 1996–97 and 1997–98, Stamford joined the Midland Division of the Southern League, which was renamed the Eastern Division at the end of their first season. In 2003–04, they finished seventh and were promoted to the Premier Division due to league restructuring, but were relegated after a single season. In 2005–06, they reached the promotion play-offs, and after defeating Barking & East Ham United 3–2 in the semi-finals, they beat Wivenhoe Town 2–1 in the final with a goal from Mark Foster to earn promotion.

Stamford fared better in their second Premier Division stint finishing the campaign in eighth place. The season ended with silverware as the Daniels claimed their fifth different county cup, beating Brigg Town to win the Senior Shield at Lincoln City's Sincil Bank Stadium.

At the end of July 2012, Chris Rivett joined the board of directors and was appointed as chairman two weeks later. Under his stewardship, during the 2012–13 season, the club announced that together with the town's college they were going to move into a new stadium on Ryhall Road, Stamford for the 2014–15 season.

Drury left The Daniels halfway through the 2012–13 season to take charge of Boston United so in January 2013, the board gave Wayne Hatswell his managerial debut with current player David Staff as his assistant. Hatswell guided Stamford to the play-offs, finishing 4th to set up a semi-final trip to 3rd place Belper. Recovering form 2–0 down after 10 minutes, Stamford won the game 4–2 to set up a play-off final at home to Chasetown. A bumper crowd of 864 saw Stamford win 2–1 to gain promotion to the Northern Premier League Premier Division for the first time since 2008. Stamford then had another managerial change with Hatswell leaving for a coaching role at League 2 Newport County. His deputy David Staff was promoted for his first managerial position for the 2013-2014 campaign. The season culminated in winning the Lincolnshire Senior Trophy in the final against Brigg Town.

The 2014–15 season was the last started at the Wothorpe Road ground, and their last game there on 22 November before the club moved to their new home at the Zeeco Stadium. On 13 December 2014, the club started a new chapter with the first game in the Zeeco Stadium. Unfortunately, it took longer than expected to get their first home league win - it came down to the last game of the season (April 2015) against Witton Albion - when the win was the only way to stay in the Premier Division.

The 2016–17 season saw the Daniels reach the first round proper of the FA Cup for the first time after beating National League side Wrexham 3–2 away in a 4th qualifying round replay. In their first round tie, they were beaten 3–0 by League Two side Hartlepool United.

The 2022–23 season saw Stamford crowned NPL Division One Midlands champions and earn promotion back to the seventh tier.

== Ground ==
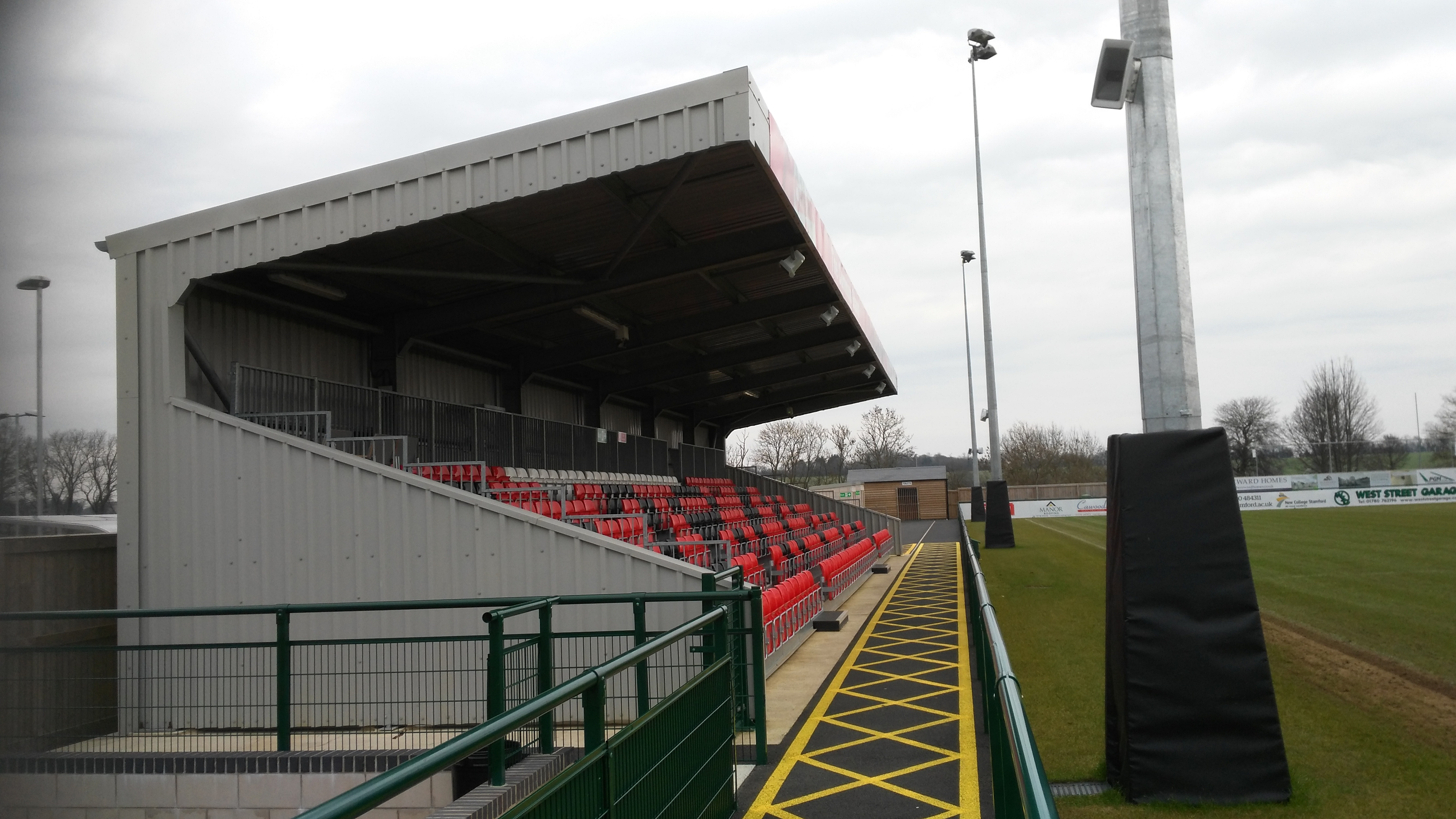
Stamford F.C. seated main stand

From the formation of the club in 1896 until the end of 2014, the club played on Hanson's Field in Kettering Road, St Martins. When the Burghley Estate, owners of the land, decided to redevelop that site for housing a new stadium was built in conjunction with the nascent Sports Institute of New College, Stamford at Borderville on Ryhall Road, to the north of town. The stadium has a terrace behind one of the goals as well as an all-seated stand along one side of the pitch with room for 300 spectators.

The first game at the Borderville ground was on 13 December 2014 in a Northern Premier League match against Nantwich Town. The highest attendance at the Borderville ground is 1,771 set on 8 July 2025 when Stamford played League One side Peterborough United in a Pre-Season Friendly.

== Squad ==
Note: Flags indicate national team as defined under FIFA eligibility rules; some limited exceptions apply. Players may hold more than one non-FIFA nationality.

No.	Pos.	Nation	Player
—	GK	ENG	Tom Jackson
—	GK	ENG	Nykah Liburd-Hines
—	DF	ENG	Kyle Rowley
—	DF	IRL	Jaden Charles
—	DF	NIR	Ryan Wilson (on loan from Mickleover)
—	DF	ENG	Charlie Marzano
—	DF	ENG	Alex Collard
—	DF	ENG	Jordon Cooke
—	DF	ENG	Connor Bartle
—	DF	ENG	Matty Miles
—	DF	GER	Hervé Pepe
—	DF	NIR	Rhys Sharpe
—	DF	ENG	Evan Payne
—	MF	ENG	Billy Bennett
—	MF	ENG	Joe Burgess

No.	Pos.	Nation	Player
—	MF	ENG	Jon Challinor
—	MF	ENG	Jason Law
—	MF	ENG	Jack Thomas
—	MF	ENG	George Hobbins
—	MF	ENG	Harry Vince
—	MF	ENG	Elliott Durrell
—	FW	ENG	Luke Johnson
—	FW	ENG	Kai Tonge
—	FW	ENG	Michael Frew
—	FW	CPV	Joao Varela
—	FW	ENG	Lee Shaw (Dual registration with Grantham Town)
—	FW	ENG	Manni Norkett (on loan from Boston United)
—	FW	ENG	Fletcher Toll (on loan from King's Lynn Town)
—	FW	ENG	Cameron Johnson
—	FW	ENG	Tobias Liversidge

== Records ==
- Best FA Cup performance: 1st round, 2016–17
- Best FA Trophy performance: 5th round, 2004–05
- Best FA Vase performance: Winners, 1979–80 (replay)

== Honours ==
League

- United Counties League Premier Division
  - Champions: 1975–76, 1977–78, 1979–80, 1980–81, 1981–82, 1996–97, 1997–98
- United Counties League Eastern Division
  - Play-off winners: 2006, 2013
- Northern Premier League Division One Midlands
  - Champions: 2022–23
  - Runners-up: 2021–22

Cup

- FA Vase
  - Winners: 1979–80
  - Runners up: 1975–76, 1983–84
- Knockout Cup
  - Winners: 1979–80, 1981–82
