= Macclesfield Express =

Weekly newspaper in Cheshire

- Type: Weekly newspaper
- Owner(s): Reach plc
- Circulation: 2,368 (as of 2023)
- Website: cheshire-live.co.uk/all-about/macclesfield

The Macclesfield Express is a weekly newspaper for and about people who live and work in the Macclesfield area of Cheshire. It comes out on Wednesdays and can be bought in all local newsagents.

The paper is available online. It is published by M.E.N. Media and printed by Trinity Mirror, both in Oldham.
