= Shaun Brisley =

English footballer

Personal information
- Full name: Shaun Richard Brisley
- Date of birth: 6 May 1990 (age 36)
- Place of birth: Macclesfield, England
- Height: 6 ft 4 in (1.92 m)
- Position: Defender

Youth career
- 2003–2007: Macclesfield Town

Senior career*
Years	Team	Apps	(Gls)
2007–2012	Macclesfield Town	124	(6)
2012	→ Peterborough United (loan)	11	(0)
2012–2016	Peterborough United	67	(1)
2014–2015	→ Scunthorpe United (loan)	7	(0)
2015	→ Northampton Town (loan)	9	(1)
2016	→ Leyton Orient (loan)	16	(1)
2016–2017	Carlisle United	28	(2)
2017–2019	Notts County	57	(2)
2019–2021	Port Vale	33	(2)
2021–2022	Wrexham	3	(1)
2022–2023	Buxton	42	(1)
2023–2024	Alfreton Town	30	(2)
2024–2025	Matlock Town	5	(0)
2025	→ Congleton Town (loan)	16	(1)
Total		448	(20)
- * Club domestic league appearances and goals

Shaun Richard Brisley (born 6 May 1990) is an English former professional footballer who played as a defender. He made 528 league and cup appearances in an 18-year career in the English Football League and non-League football.

Brisley began his career at Macclesfield Town. After his senior debut in March 2008, he quickly became a first-team regular, making 142 league and cup appearances in under 4 years. He joined Peterborough United on an initial loan deal in February 2012, which was made permanent three months later. He won the Football League Trophy with the club in 2014 and scored in the final. He was loaned out to Scunthorpe United, Northampton Town and Leyton Orient before he joined Carlisle United on a free transfer in July 2016. He moved on to Notts County 12 months later, though he was released after the club's relegation out of the English Football League at the end of the 2018–19 season. He signed with Port Vale in August 2019 and stayed at the club for two seasons before joining Wrexham in July 2021. He moved on to Buxton 12 months later and then spent one season with Alfreton Town before moving on to Matlock Town. He was loaned to Congleton Town for the second half of the 2024–25 season.

== Career ==
=== Macclesfield Town ===
Brisley was born in Macclesfield and attended local schools Ivy Bank Primary School and Henbury High School. At the age of 13 he joined the Macclesfield Town youth team and turned professional at the club at the age of 18. He made his professional debut on 1 March 2008, in a 1–1 draw with Notts County at Moss Rose that was also Keith Alexander's first game as manager. He scored his first 2 goals for the club in a 2–1 home victory over Accrington Stanley on 29 March. He ended the 2007–08 season with ten League Two appearances to his name. He went on to establish himself in the Macclesfield's defence, featuring 43 times across the 2008–09 campaign, scoring goals in both the League Cup and FA Cup. He scored 2 goals in 36 appearances in the 2009–10 season and was sent off for the first time in his career after committing a professional foul on Chris O'Grady in a 3–0 defeat at Rochdale on 5 December. In August 2010, Brisley suffered a hip injury which required surgery, keeping him out of action for four months. The injury was caused by an extra bit of bone on his thigh bone, which was trimmed down and smoothed out under the surgery. He returned to action. He was put back into the first-team by manager Gary Simpson, ending the 2010–11 season with 16 appearances to his name. Chairman Mike Rance said he was disappointed to lose Brisley to Peterborough but was proud that the centre-back had come through the club's academy.

=== Peterborough United ===
On 20 February 2012, Brisley joined Championship side Peterborough United on an emergency loan with a view to a permanent deal when the transfer window opened in July. Manager Darren Ferguson said that he first attempted to sign the defender three seasons earlier. However, a then-teenaged Brisley, suffered homesickness and returned to his hometown club. He made his debut for the "Posh" on 10 March, in a 3–1 win over Blackpool at London Road. The loan deal was made permanent on 8 May for "a fee in the region of £300,000". He played 31 games in the 2012–13 campaign as United were relegated into League One. He appeared 32 times in the 2013–14 campaign and on 30 March he scored what BBC Sport correspondent Ian Woodcock described as a "powerful headed goal" in the Football League Trophy final as Peterborough lifted the trophy with a 3–1 victory over Chesterfield at Wembley Stadium. However, he was also sent off twice during the campaign, in league defeats at Walsall and Bradford City.

On 25 September 2014, he joined League One rivals Scunthorpe United on a one-month loan deal; manager Russ Wilcox said that he was surprised to land his number one target and that Brisley would cover for the suspended Miguel Llera. On 5 November, the loan was extended until 3 January. He played a total of seven games during his time at Glanford Park, though featured only three times after Mark Robins succeeded Wilcox as manager. He also played 16 times for Peterborough during the 2014–15 season.

In June 2015, it was reported that he had been transfer-listed by new manager Dave Robertson. On 11 September, he joined Northampton Town of League Two for a one-month loan agreement. He admitted the loan move came as a surprise to him but was hopeful of getting game time at Sixfields. The loan was later extended into a second month, however, was then cut short after he sustained medial ligament damage in his knee on 24 October and was sidelined for eight weeks; manager Chris Wilder said that the news was "disappointing because he's been superb for us". On 27 January, he returned to League Two on loan with Leyton Orient until the end of the 2015–16 season. He was named on the Football League Team of the Week after scoring the only goal of the game at Notts County on 20 February. He featured 16 times for Orient, scoring one goal, and said he would be interested in a permanent move to Brisbane Road.

=== Carlisle United ===
On 4 July 2016, Brisley signed a two-year contract with Carlisle United. He said that manager Keith Curle's 'sales pitch' convinced him to join and that he aimed to help the team gain promotion out of League Two. He made 34 appearances in the 2016–17 campaign, though agreed to a mutual termination of his contract after Curle told him he could not guarantee him playing time at Brunton Park next season.

=== Notts County ===
On 24 July 2017, Brisley signed a two-year contract with League Two side Notts County in a move that reunited him with former Leyton Orient boss Kevin Nolan. He scored his first goal for Notts County in his second appearances for the "Magpies", in an EFL Cup tie at Scunthorpe United on 8 August. He quickly found good form in a centre-back partnership with Richard Duffy and credited his new vegan diet for his increased fitness. He made 46 appearances in the 2017–18 campaign, helping County to reach the play-offs, where they were beaten by Coventry City at the semi-final stage. He was played in a holding midfield role by new manager Harry Kewell in October 2018. However, he was dropped from the first-team by Kewell's successor, Neal Ardley, and was also criticised for his performances in the reserves by coach Steve Chettle. He left Meadow Lane after being released following the club's relegation out of the English Football League and into the National League at the end of the 2018–19 season.

=== Port Vale ===
On 30 August 2019, he signed a one-year contract for League Two side Port Vale. He was signed by manager John Askey, who was his former youth team manager at Macclesfield, but had to spend his first month with the "Valiants" building his fitness before taking his place on the bench as Leon Legge and Nathan Smith had established an effective centre-back partnership together. Injury to Smith allowed him a run in the first-team in late January, and he quickly impressed with his performances, scoring the opening goal in a 3–2 victory at Forest Green Rovers on 11 February. His good form continued to keep Smith out of the first-team until his run of six matches was ended by a knee injury picked up in a 2–2 draw with Walsall on 22 February, a medial ligament problem which required five weeks of rest. He was nominated for the PFA League Two Player of the Month award for February. He was signed a new one-year contract after he ended the 2019–20 campaign with one goal in 14 appearances.

He started the 2020–21 season on the bench as Legge and Smith were established at centre-back. Despite establishing himself in a back three alongside Legge and Smith under new manager Darrell Clarke, he was released in the summer upon the expiry of his contract. His agent, Phil Sproson, said that Brisley was disappointed not to be offered a new deal considering his form and experience.

=== Later career ===
On 9 July 2021, Brisley dropped down to the National League to sign for Wrexham on a two-year deal. However, he played just five games for Phil Parkinson's "Red Dragons" in the 2021–22 season and left the Racecourse Ground by mutual consent.

On 7 July 2022, Brisley joined newly promoted National League North club Buxton. He made 46 appearances in the 2022–23 season, scoring one goal. On 30 May 2023, he was announced as a new signing for divisional rivals Alfreton Town, after manager Billy Heath approached him to add experience to his backline. He made 34 appearances in the 2023–24 campaign, including one in the play-off quarter-final defeat to Boston United.

On 16 May 2024, Brisley joined Northern Premier League Premier Division side Matlock Town and was described by manager Nicky Law as a "good old pro". Following the appointment of former Northampton Town teammate Ryan Cresswell as manager, Brisley was appointed assistant-player manager. In January 2025, he dropped down a division to join Congleton Town on loan for the remainder of the 2024–25 season. He was sent off in his third game for the club, a 5–1 defeat at Widnes. He went on to feature in the play-off final defeat at Hednesford Town.

== Style of play ==
Brisley's agency describes him as a defender noted for his "strength, physical presence, and defensive discipline". Port Vale coach Dave Kevan praised his attitude, reliability and distribution.

== Personal life ==
Brisley turned vegan in 2017 after being introduced to the diet by his partner and credited it with improving his fitness.

== Career statistics ==
Appearances and goals by club, season and competition
Club	Season	League			FA Cup		League Cup		Other		Total	
Club	Season	Division	Apps	Goals	Apps	Goals	Apps	Goals	Apps	Goals	Apps	Goals
Macclesfield Town	2007–08	League Two	10	2	0	0	0	0	0	0	10	2
Macclesfield Town	2008–09	League Two	38	0	2	1	2	1	1 (Note: Appearance(s) in the Football League Trophy)	0	43	2
Macclesfield Town	2009–10	League Two	33	1	1	0	1	0	1	1	36	2
Macclesfield Town	2010–11	League Two	14	0	0	0	1	0	1	0	16	0
Macclesfield Town	2011–12	League Two	29	3	5	0	2	0	1	0	37	3
Macclesfield Town	Total		124	6	8	1	6	1	4	1	142	9
Peterborough United	2011–12	Championship	11	0	—		—		—		11	0
Peterborough United	2012–13	Championship	28	0	1	0	2	0	—		31	0
Peterborough United	2013–14	League One	22	0	4	0	0	0	6	1	32	1
Peterborough United	2014–15	League One	15	1	0	0	0	0	1	0	16	1
Peterborough United	2015–16	League One	2	0	0	0	1	0	0	0	3	0
Peterborough United	Total		78	1	5	0	3	0	7	1	93	2
Scunthorpe United (loan)	2014–15	League One	7	0	0	0	—		0	0	7	0
Northampton Town (loan)	2015–16	League Two	9	1	0	0	—		1	0	10	1
Leyton Orient (loan)	2015–16	League Two	16	1	—		—		—		16	1
Carlisle United	2016–17	League Two	28	2	2	0	0	0	4	0	34	2
Notts County	2017–18	League Two	37	2	5	0	1	1	3 (Note: One appearance in EFL Trophy and two appearances in League Two play-offs)	0	46	3
Notts County	2018–19	League Two	20	0	1	0	1	0	4 (Note: Appearance(s) in EFL Trophy)	0	26	0
Notts County	Total		57	2	6	0	2	1	7	0	72	3
Port Vale	2019–20	League Two	9	1	1	0	—		4	0	14	1
Port Vale	2020–21	League Two	24	1	0	0	1	0	4	0	29	1
Port Vale	Total		33	2	1	0	1	0	8	0	43	2
Wrexham	2021–22	National League	3	1	2	0	—		0	0	5	1
Buxton	2022–23	National League North	42	1	3	0	—		1 (Note: Appearance(s) in the FA Trophy)	0	46	1
Alfreton Town	2023–24	National League North	30	2	3	0	—		1 (Note: Appearance(s) in the play-offs)	0	34	2
Matlock Town	2024–25	Northern Premier League; Premier Division	5	0	2	0	—		1 (Note: Appearance(s) in the Derbyshire Senior Cup)	0	8	0
Congleton Town (loan)	2024–25	Northern Premier League; Division One West	16	1	—		—		2	0	18	1
Career total			448	20	32	1	12	2	36	2	528	25

== Honours ==
Peterborough United

- Football League Trophy: 2014
