= Kyle Fraser-Allen =

English footballer (born 1990)

Personal information
- Full name: Kyle Alexander Fraser-Allen
- Date of birth: 12 February 1990 (age 36)
- Place of birth: Wanstead, England
- Height: 5 ft 11 in (1.80 m)
- Position: Midfielder

Youth career
- ?–2008: Tottenham Hotspur

Senior career*
Years	Team	Apps	(Gls)
2008–2009	Tottenham Hotspur	0	(0)
2009	→ Macclesfield Town (loan)	2	(0)
2009–10	Hayes and Yeading United	3	(0)
2013	Banbury United	7	(0)
2010	Redbridge	?	(?)
- * Club domestic league appearances and goals as of 21:44, 3 March 2009 (UTC)

Kyle Alexander Fraser-Allen (born 12 February 1990) is an English football player, who plays for Hayes and Yeading.

== Career ==
Fraser-Allen was a member of the Tottenham Hotspur youth academy, participated in the majority of the 2007-08 academy season. On 25 February 2009, Fraser-Allen joined Macclesfield Town on loan and later made his professional debut by appearing as a 76th-minute substitute against Port Vale. He returned to Tottenham at the end of March.

On 1 June 2009, Fraser-Allen was released from his Tottenham Hotspur contract.

On 27 September 2009, he signed with Conference National side Hayes and Yeading.

He also used to play for Nike Academy.

== Personal life ==
Fraser-Allen attended Wanstead High School, London.
