= Jordan Hadfield =

English footballer

Personal information
- Full name: Jordan Michael Hadfield
- Date of birth: 12 August 1987 (age 39)
- Place of birth: Swinton, England
- Height: 5 ft 10 in (1.78 m)
- Position: Midfielder

Team information
- Current team: Trafford

Youth career
- –2005: Stockport County

Senior career*
Years	Team	Apps	(Gls)
2005–2006	Stockport County	1	(0)
2006–2009	Macclesfield Town	55	(1)
2007–2008	→ Milton Keynes Dons (loan)	13	(0)
2009	→ Altrincham (loan)	4	(0)
2009	Ashton United		
2010	Kettering Town	15	(0)
2011–2012	Radcliffe Borough		
2012–	Ashton United		
- * Club domestic league appearances and goals as of 21:25, 4 April 2010 (UTC)

Jordan Michael Hadfield (born 12 August 1987) is an English footballer.

== Career ==
Hadfield started his football career with Stockport County but was never offered a contract for first team status and was released.

After being released he joined Macclesfield, even offering to play for free to show his abilities. After one season playing for nothing, Hadfield had convinced the coaching staff he had what it takes to play football at this level and was offered a three-year contract.

Hadfield famously played in Macclesfield Town's 3rd Round FA Cup clash against Chelsea at Stamford Bridge in 2007. The magic of the FA Cup was not to be, and there was no giant killing as Macclesfield were soundly beaten 6–1, despite the heroic efforts of goal keeper Tommy Lee.

Hadfield then posed in the Salford Advertiser that week with the swapped shirt of Frank Lampard.

During the 2006–07 season, Hadfield had the infamy of being placed in the bad boy league of The Sun due to the amount of fouls committed and the bookings he received, not to mention three sendings off that season.

When Paul Ince left Macclesfield Town to take charge of League Two promotion contenders MK Dons, Ince took Hadfield on loan. Unfortunately for Hadfield, he would only make 13 appearances during the promotion winning campaign and returned to Macclesfield.

Hadfield also went on loan to Altrincham.

He was released by Macclesfield at the end of the 2009 season and signed on at Ashton United.

He then signed for Conference Premier team Kettering Town on a non contract basis in January 2010.

He joined Radcliffe Borough in August 2011.

In October 2012 he re-joined his former club Ashton United.

== Honours ==
Milton Keynes Dons

- Football League Two: 2007–08
