= Danny Thomas (footballer, born 1981) =

English footballer (born 1981)

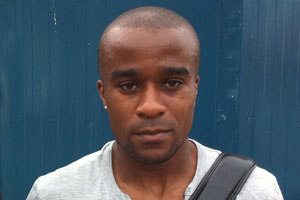
- Thomas in 2010

Personal information
- Date of birth: 1 May 1981 (age 45)
- Place of birth: Leamington Spa, England
- Height: 5 ft 7 in (1.70 m)
- Position: Winger

Youth career
- 1997–1999: Nottingham Forest and Leicester City

Senior career*
Years	Team	Apps	(Gls)
1999–2002	Leicester City	3	(0)
2002–2004	AFC Bournemouth	59	(2)
2004–2006	Boston United	82	(8)
2006–2007	Shrewsbury Town	5	(0)
2007	Hereford United	15	(2)
2007–2009	Macclesfield Town	83	(6)
2009–2010	Kettering Town	34	(3)
2010–2012	Tamworth	82	(10)
2012–2013	FH	15	(0)
Total		378	(31)
- * Club domestic league appearances and goals

Danny Justin Thomas (born 1 May 1981) is an English former footballer player who played as a left-winger.

== Career ==
Born in Leamington Spa, Warwickshire, Thomas was selected to attend the FA National School at Lilleshall between 1995 and 1997, which was run by the FA, for the best footballers in the country. During his time at Lilleshall Thomas played alongside Scott Parker, Francis Jeffers and Alan Smith, while Michael Owen and Wes Brown were in the year above. He started his career as a trainee at Nottingham Forest and later Leicester City, and made his first team debut against Newcastle United in December 1999. In February 2002, he moved to AFC Bournemouth. During his time with The Cherries he was a first team regular, winning promotion to Division Two. However, he featured infrequently the following season, playing one match for Notts County reserves, and eventually joined Boston United in March 2004. He scored from a free kick on his debut for the Pilgrims. In the 2004–05 season he started 40 matches, scoring 6 goals.

After training spells with both Grimsby Town and Cheltenham Town, he signed for Shrewsbury Town on non-contract terms. On 25 January 2007, he signed for Hereford United until the end of the season. The winger made his first team debut against Barnet on the left wing, and scored in the last minute of the match. He was a regular on the left wing for the remainder of the season, and left after turning down a contract.

On 15 June, after deciding not to re-sign for Hereford, Thomas joined Macclesfield Town on a two-year contract. In his first season, Thomas was awarded the 'player's player of the season' award. Offered a contract extension early in his second season, he initially turned it down, then agreed to the deal later that season, only for the club to withdraw the offer at the end of the season due to a change in management. At the end of the contract he was released from the club.

In August 2009 he joined Conference National side Kettering Town.

On 15 June 2010, after leaving Kettering Town, it was speculated that Thomas would be joining Conference National team Tamworth, and the following day this was confirmed. Following a successful first season with The Lambs, where Thomas picked up several awards, he opted to stay with the club for a further season with the option of another 12 months after that.

In May 2012, Icelandic club FH signed Thomas on a free transfer. After a successful start to his Icelandic league career at left-back, Thomas made four appearances in the Europa League qualifiers before the club was knocked out of the competition by Swedish club AIK.

With three games left to play, FH were crowned champions of the season and went on to compete in the Champions League qualifiers in 2013.

In January 2013, Thomas decided to retire from football to begin a career outside of the sport.

== Career statistics ==
As of match played 29 September 2012

Club performance			League		Cup		League Cup		Continental		Total	
Season	Club	League	Apps	Goals	Apps	Goals	Apps	Goals	Apps	Goals	Apps	Goals
England			League		FA Cup		League Cup		Europe		Total	
1999–2000	Leicester City	FA Premier League	3	0	0	0	0	0	0	0	3	0
2000–01	Leicester City	FA Premier League	0	0	0	0	0	0	0	0	0	0
2001–02	AFC Bournemouth	Division Two	12	0	0	0	0	0	0	0	12	0
2002–03	AFC Bournemouth	Division Three	37	2	6	1	1	2	0	0	44	5
2003–04	AFC Bournemouth	Division Two	10	0	0	0	1	0	0	0	11	0
2003–04	Boston United	Division Three	8	3	0	0	0	0	0	0	8	3
2004–05	Boston United	League Two	39	3	4	0	1	0	0	0	44	3
2005–06	Boston United	League Two	35	2	3	0	1	0	0	0	39	2
2006–07	Shrewsbury Town	League Two	6	0	0	0	0	0	0	0	6	0
2006–07	Hereford United	League Two	15	2	0	0	0	0	0	0	15	2
2007–08	Macclesfield Town	League Two	43	4	1	0	1	0	0	0	45	4
2008–09	Macclesfield Town	League Two	40	2	3	0	2	0	0	0	45	2
2009–10	Kettering Town	Conference National	34	3	3	0	0	0	0	0	37	3
2010–11	Tamworth	Conference National	45	7	4	2	0	0	0	0	49	9
2011–12	Tamworth	Conference National	37	3	5	0	0	0	0	0	42	3
Total	England		364	31	29	3	7	2	0	0	400	36
2012	FH	Úrvalsdeild	15	0	1	0	0	0	4	0	20	0
Career total			379	31	30	3	7	2	4	0	420	36

== Honours ==
AFC Bournemouth

- Football League Third Division play-offs: 2003
