= Ricky Sappleton =

Jamaican footballer (born 1989)

Personal information
- Full name: Reneil St Aubin Sappleton
- Date of birth: 8 December 1989 (age 36)
- Place of birth: Kingston, Jamaica
- Height: 1.91 m (6 ft 3 in)
- Positions: Striker; centre back

Team information
- Current team: Cheshunt

Youth career
- Queens Park Rangers

Senior career*
| Years | Team | Apps | (Gls) |
| 2006–2007 | Queens Park Rangers | 0 | (0) |
| 2007–2010 | Leicester City | 1 | (0) |
| 2008 | → AFC Bournemouth (loan) | 3 | (1) |
| 2008–2009 | → Oxford United (loan) | 4 | (1) |
| 2009 | → AFC Telford United (loan) | 7 | (1) |
| 2009 | → Macclesfield Town (loan) | 11 | (6) |
| 2010–2011 | Macclesfield Town | 18 | (2) |
| 2012–2013 | Bishop's Stortford | 46 | (10) |
| 2013–2015 | Billericay Town | 66 | (28) |
| 2015–2016 | Kingstonian | 15 | (7) |
| 2016 | VCD Athletic | 18 | (10) |
| 2016 | Billericay Town | 16 | (2) |
| 2017 | Kingstonian | 7 | (1) |
| 2017–2018 | Heybridge Swifts | 10 | (2) |
| 2018 | Cheshunt | 6 | (2) |
| 2018–2019 | Haringey Borough | 11 | (1) |
| 2019– | Cheshunt | 1 | (0) |

International career
| 2008–2009 | Jamaica U-20 | 5 | (0) |
- * Club domestic league appearances and goals as of 20:41, 25 August 2019 (UTC)

Reneil St Aubin "Ricky" Sappleton (born 8 December 1989) is a Jamaican footballer who plays for Cheshunt.

== Youth career ==
Sappleton came through the youth academy of his local club, Queens Park Rangers (QPR), where he had a successful youth career.

== Career ==
Before joining Leicester City, Sappleton had a trial with Liverpool, and also joined Middlesbrough on a two-week trial. He made his senior debut in a 2–1 home defeat to Southampton on 1 December.

On 12 August 2008, Sappleton joined AFC Bournemouth on loan for a month, scoring on his debut in a 1–1 draw against Aldershot Town on 16 August. He secured a second loan move that season, joining Oxford United for a month on New Year's Eve. He again scored on his debut and made an assist in a 2–0 home win over Salisbury City on 1 January 2009. In March 2009 Sappleton joined Conference North club AFC Telford until the end of the season but did not secure a deal with the Midlands club.

On 28 August 2009, Sappleton again moved on loan, this time joining Macclesfield Town on loan until January 2010. Sappleton scored six goals while on loan under the guidance of Keith Alexander.

On 29 January 2010, Sappleton joined Macclesfield on a free transfer signing an 18-month contract, having been released by mutual consent by Leicester the same day. In March 2010, Sappleton injured his knee requiring surgery that ruled him out for the rest of the 2009–10 League Two season at Macclesfield Town. In December 2010, Sappleton recovered from knee surgery and commenced regular squad training, he made only a few league appearances in the 2010–11 season. On 26 February 2011, Sappleton was sent off for a bad tackle which led to a mass brawl involving twenty-one of the twenty-two players on the pitch against Wycombe Wanderers having only been on for a matter of minutes. Sappleton was released at the end of the season.

He made his debut for Bishop's Stortford in the 4–1 win against Guiseley. On 3 August 2013, Sappleton joined Billericay Town as they sought to rebuild their squad for an attempt of promotion back to the Conference South.

He then joined Isthmian League Premier Division club Kingstonian in June 2015. Manager Tommy Williams said: "I'm delighted to have signed Ricky, he is a powerful forward that scores goals. Ricky has good quality and I'm really looking forward to working with him".

In 2016 Sappleton joined Isthmian League club VCD Athletic, before moving on to Billericay Town later that season. He returned to former club Kingstonian in the 2017 off-season, but joined Heybridge Swifts in October 2017. He went on to make 19 appearances for Heybridge, scoring two goals, before being released on 19 January 2018. Manager Jody Brown said, "He’s a top guy, but never really got going and found the travelling for training and midweek games difficult." Sappleton played for Cheshunt and Haringey Borough in the 2018–19 season, before re-joining Cheshunt for 2019–20.

== International ==
Sappleton was included in the Jamaica squad during the CONCACAF U-20 Final Round in 2009, mainly due to a strong performance in two friendlies versus Canada U20s in Fort Lauderdale. Sappleton performed well during the 2009 CONCACAF U20 Final round in Tobago, although Jamaica did not reach the semi-finals.
