= Christian Millar =

English footballer

Personal information
- Full name: Christian Dale Millar
- Date of birth: 23 November 1989 (age 36)
- Place of birth: Stoke-on-Trent, England
- Position: Midfielder

Team information
- Current team: Newcastle Town

Youth career
- Stoke City

Senior career*
Years	Team	Apps	(Gls)
2008–2009	Macclesfield Town	4	(0)
2008–2009	→ Stafford Rangers (loan)	0	(0)
2009–	Buxton		
- Witton Albion
2010–2012	Leek Town		
2012–	Newcastle Town		
- * Club domestic league appearances and goals as of 15:38, 20 June 2009 (UTC)

Christian Dale Millar (born 23 November 1989), is an English footballer who plays as a midfielder for Newcastle Town.

== Football career ==
Millar started his career in Stoke City's youth academy system playing through from the youngest age bracket to the under 18's side where he failed to gain a YT contract. From there Millar went on several trials and open days to find a club resulting in his signing on with Macclesfield Town. He made his debut in January 2008 against Morecambe coming on as a substitute. In December 2008, Millar went to Stafford Rangers on a one month's loan spell. After impressing in his first month, his loan spell was extended to three months in which Millar was a valued member of the side contributing with two goals.

Millar signed for Buxton in August 2009 after being released by Macclesfield despite being invited back by Stafford for pre-season training.

He then joined Witton Albion before moving to Leek Town in September 2010, and then re-signing again on non-contract terms for the 2011 season.

He left Leek in October 2012 having made 82 appearances scoring six goals. He then moved to Newcastle Town.
