= Nat Brown =

English footballer

Personal information
- Full name: Nathaniel Brown
- Date of birth: 15 June 1981 (age 45)
- Place of birth: Sheffield, England
- Height: 6 ft 2 in (1.88 m)
- Position: Defender

Youth career
- 1988–2000: Huddersfield Town

Senior career*
Years	Team	Apps	(Gls)
2000–2005	Huddersfield Town	76	(0)
2005–2008	Lincoln City	94	(8)
2008–2009	Wrexham	7	(0)
2008–2009	→ Macclesfield Town (loan)	30	(6)
2009–2013	Macclesfield Town	141	(8)
2013	→ Lincoln City (loan)	10	(0)
2013–2016	Lincoln City	85	(2)
2015–2016	→ FC Halifax Town (loan)	4	(0)
2016	→ Harrogate Town (loan)	5	(0)
2016–2017	Boston United	25	(2)
2017–2018	Brighouse Town	3	(0)
Total		480	(26)
- * Club domestic league appearances and goals

Nathaniel Levi Brown (born 15 June 1981) is an English former professional footballer who played as a defender.

He played in the Football League for Huddersfield Town, Lincoln City and Macclesfield Town. He also played at non-league level for Wrexham, FC Halifax Town, Harrogate Town, Boston United and Brighouse Town

== Career ==
Born in Sheffield, Brown worked his way through the ranks at Huddersfield Town before settling down and making over 80 appearances for them without scoring a goal. Although he was very much a fan favourite, with "Nat Brown for England" heard ringing round any stadium he frequented.

Was well known around Lincolnshire with the local football clubs, whenever a ball was booted into the air the words hoof nat brown were shouted.

Brown is a versatile player who can play in central defence or as a striker. He has, however, also played in the central midfield role, whilst playing under former Lincoln boss, Keith Alexander.

After being released by Huddersfield, Brown was approached by several clubs, however, he opted to sign for Lincoln City. He featured heavily in Lincoln's unsuccessful Play-off drive in the 2005/06 season, putting in some impressive performances. In 2006/07 he initially found it hard settling into the squad as he initially picked up an injury, and due to the relatively impressive performances of the current first team squad, his chances of breaking into a regular spot were limited. Since, however, due to him coming back into fitness and other squad members falling ill of suspension and injury, he has proven himself once again and now finds himself a regular once more. On 26 June 2008, Brown left Lincoln after having his contract cancelled by mutual consent. He joined Wrexham in the Conference National a day later.

On 6 November 2008 he joined league two side Macclesfield Town on a month's loan linking up with his one-time Lincoln City manager Keith Alexander. He found himself something of a goalscoring touch, by scoring in his first three league games. On 1 January 2009 it was announced that Nat had signed a loan deal until the end of the season due to the good performances he had been putting in for Macclesfield Town. This move was made permanent in July 2009, when he signed a 2-year deal with the Silkmen. In May 2010 he put paper on a new two-year deal with the club, keeping him at Moss Rose until the summer of 2012.

In July 2010, he was appointed as Macclesfield's vice captain to Paul Morgan. On 1 February 2013 Brown re-joined Lincoln City on loan until the end of the 2012–13 season, linking him back up with The Imps new boss Gary Simpson who had previously managed Brown at Macclesfield after an initially being Lincoln's assistant manager in his first spell at Sincil Bank. On 3 June 2013 Brown signed a one-year contract with Lincoln.

He later played for FC Halifax Town, Harrogate Town, Boston United and Brighouse Town.

== Honours ==
Huddersfield Town

- Football League Third Division play-offs: 2004
