= Izak Reid =

English footballer

Personal information
- Full name: Izak George Reid
- Date of birth: 8 July 1987 (age 39)
- Place of birth: Stafford, England
- Position: Midfielder

Team information
- Current team: Worcester City

Senior career*
Years	Team	Apps	(Gls)
2006–2011	Macclesfield Town	146	(5)
2011–2013	Morecambe	54	(3)
2013–2014	Brackley Town	56	(12)
2014–2015	Barrow	21	(3)
2015–2016	AFC Telford United	26	(3)
2016–2019	Stafford Rangers		
2019	Chasetown	3	(0)
2019	Hednesford Town	0	(0)
2023–2026	Worcester City	36	(8)
2025	Worcester Raiders	4	(1)
- * Club domestic league appearances and goals as of 20:00, 24 February 2026 (UTC)

Izak George Reid (born 8 July 1987) is an English footballer who plays for Southern League Premier Division Central side Worcester City, where he plays as a midfielder.

== Playing career ==
Reid came through the ranks at Macclesfield Town and became a regular member of the first team in the 2007–08 season. By the time he had signed a new two-year deal with the Silkmen in July 2009 he had made 78 appearances in all competitions.

Reid signed for Morecambe on Saturday 18 June 2011 after passing a medical. He has since played for Brackley Town, Barrow and AFC Telford United.

Izak joined his hometown club Stafford Rangers in the summer of 2016.

On 23 February 2019, Izak was confirmed as signing for Northern Premier League Division One West side Chasetown.

Reid made a prompt move to Northern Premier League Premier Division side Hednesford Town on 22 March 2019.

== International career ==
Reid is eligible to play for Montserrat.

== Personal life ==
Reid has two brothers who also play football, Levi and Ishmale, both with Stafford Rangers.

== Honours ==
Worcester City

- Hellenic League Premier Division Champion: 2023–24
- Northern Premier League Division One Midlands Play Off Winner: 2024–25
