= Matthew Flynn =

English footballer

Personal information
- Full name: Matthew Edward Flynn
- Date of birth: 10 May 1989 (age 37)
- Place of birth: Hertfordshire, England
- Height: 1.88 m (6 ft 2 in)
- Position: Defender

Team information
- Current team: Curzon Ashton

Senior career*
Years	Team	Apps	(Gls)
2007–2009	Macclesfield Town	28	(0)
2008	→ Ashton United (loan)	?	(?)
2009	→ Rochdale (loan)	3	(0)
2009–2010	Rochdale	8	(0)
2011–2012	Fleetwood Town	3	(0)
2011–2012	→ Altrincham (loan)	22	(1)
2012–2013	Barrow	22	(3)
2013–2014	Southport	18	(0)
2014–2015	Hyde	6	(0)
2015	Chorley	2	(0)
2015–	Curzon Ashton		
- * Club domestic league appearances and goals as of 20:28, 5 January 2015 (UTC)

Matthew Edward Flynn (born 10 May 1989) is an English footballer who plays for Curzon Ashton as a defender.

== Career ==
Flynn began his career at Warrington Town, before signing for Macclesfield Town. He had a loan spell at Ashton United. On 13 August 2009 it was announced that he had signed a 1-month loan deal with Rochdale. This was turned into a permanent deal on 27 August 2009 after impressing manager Keith Hill over his first three games. After making 11 appearances in total for Rochdale, he signed for Fleetwood Town in August 2011 and he joined Conference North club Altrincham on a one-month loan on 1 December 2011.

Fleetwood announced his release on 1 May 2012. On 3 June 2012, Flynn signed for Barrow.
