= Lincolnshire Senior Shield =

- Founded: 2003
- Region: England
- Teams: 7
- Current champions: Stamford A.F.C. (4th title)
- Most championships: Stamford (4 titles)

The Lincolnshire Senior Shield is a County Cup competition for teams in Lincolnshire who are in steps 2-4 of the non league pyramid. The current champions are Stamford who won it for the fourth time this year. Stamford are the most successful team in the competition, winning it four times.

== Previous Winners ==
Final	Winner	Score	Runners-up	Venue	Attendance^{[A]}
2013–14	Stamford	3–3 (5-4 pens)	Brigg Town	Sincil Bank	180
2012–13	Gainsborough Trinity	1–3	Boston United	The Northolme	324
2011–12	Grantham Town	2–0	Boston United	South Kesteven Sports Stadium	258
2010–11	Stamford	0–0 (4-3 pens)	Boston United	York Street	577
2009–10	Boston United	1–0	Grantham Town	South Kesteven Sports Stadium	378
2008–09	Stamford	4–1	Boston United	York Street	405
2007–08	Gainsborough Trinity	5–1	Spalding United	South Kesteven Sports Stadium	
2006–07	Stamford	1–0	Brigg Town	Sincil Bank	245
2005–06	[N/A]	?–?	[N/A]		?
2004–05	Gainsborough Trinity	1–2	Grantham Town	The Northolme	265
2003–04	Grantham Town	2–2 (4-3 pens)	Gainsborough Trinity	South Kesteven Sports Stadium	234

== Results by team ==
Team	Winners	Runners-up	Years won	Years runner-up
Stamford	4	0	2007, 2009, 2011, 2014	—
Grantham Town	3	1	2004, 2005, 2012	2010
Boston United	2	3	2010, 2013	2009, 2011, 2012
Gainsborough Trinity	1	3	2008	2004, 2005, 2013
Brigg Town	0	2	—	2007, 2014
Spalding United	0	1	—	2008
